= Haryana =

State in northwestern India

- State
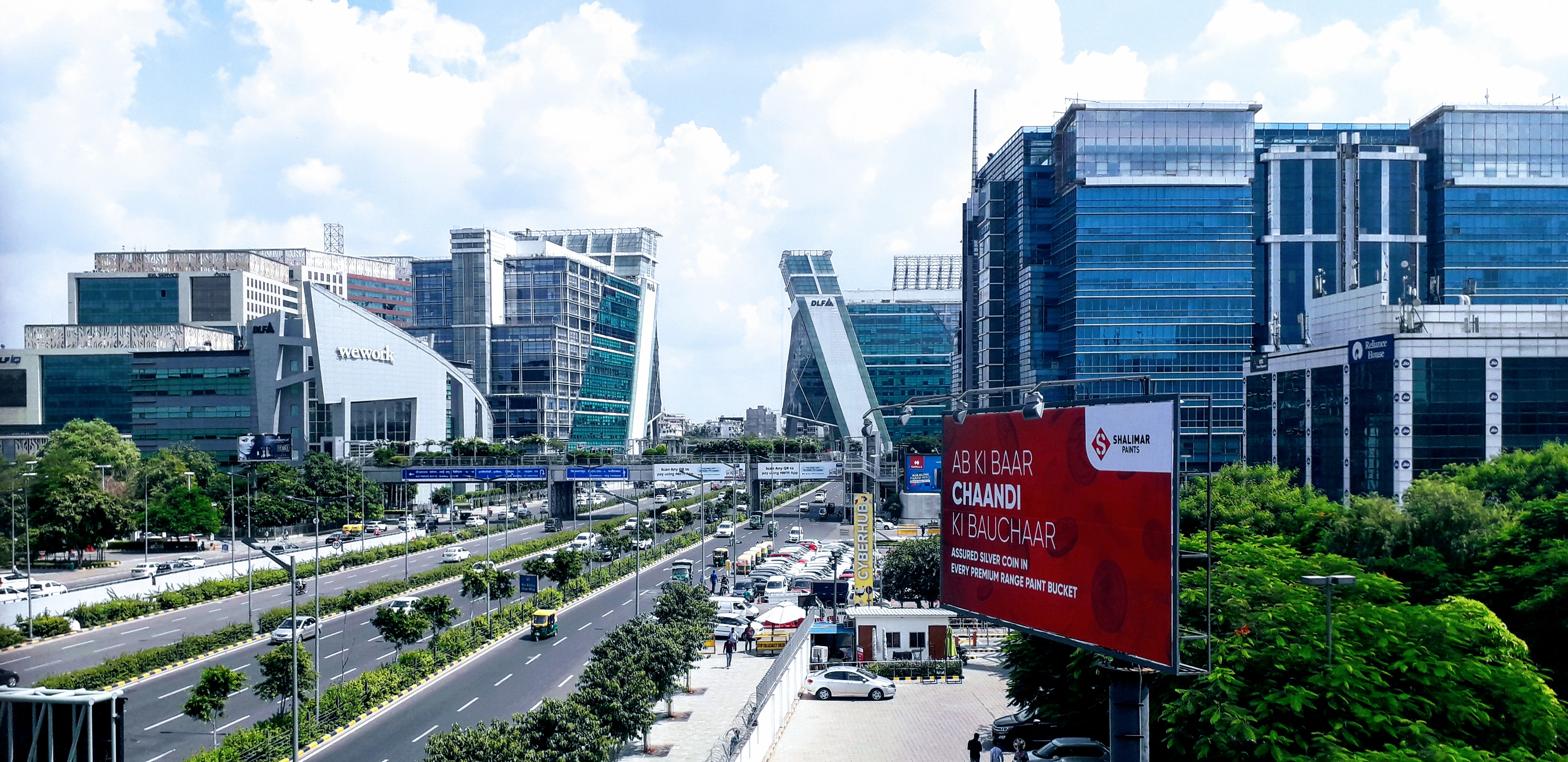
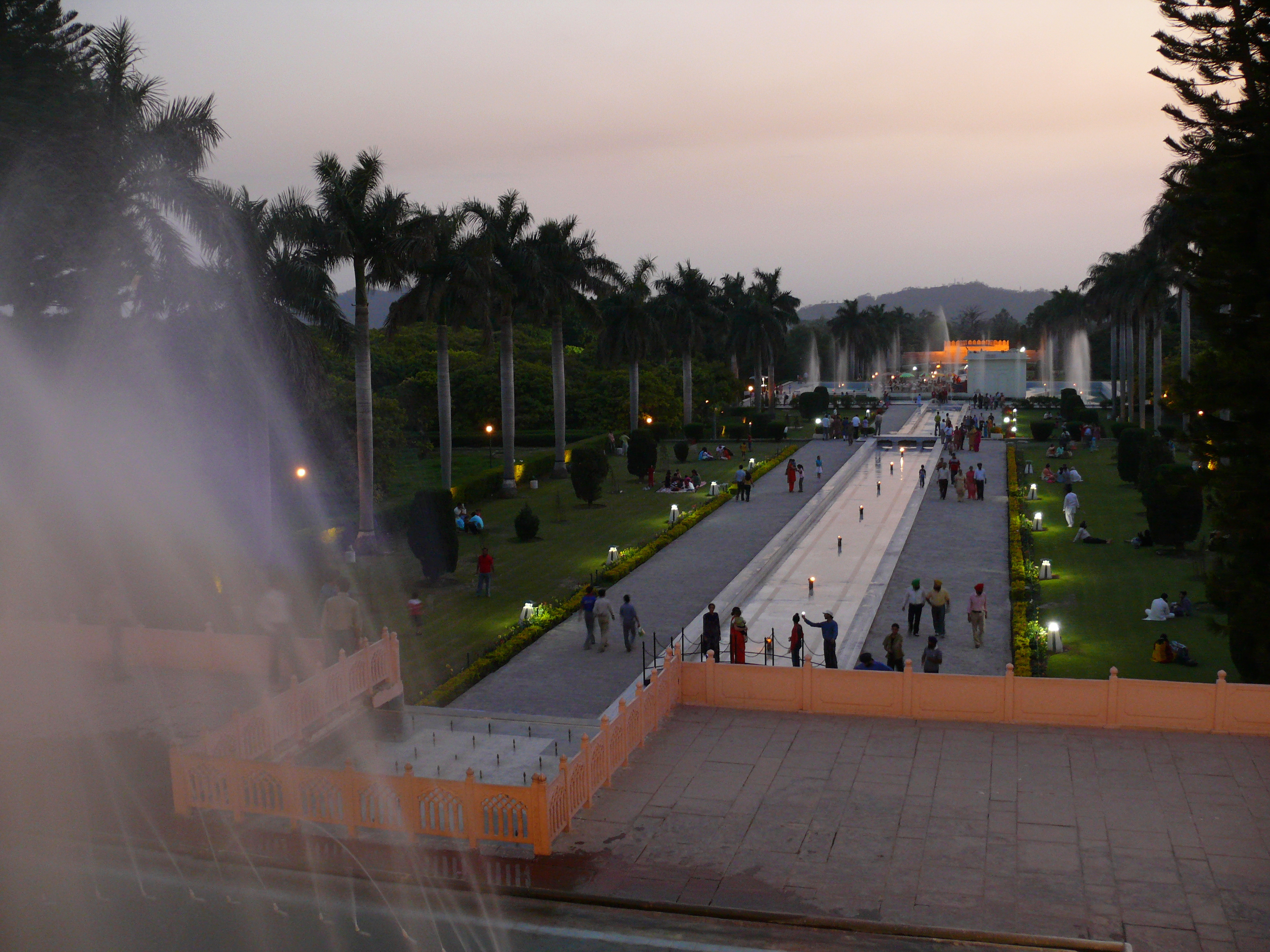
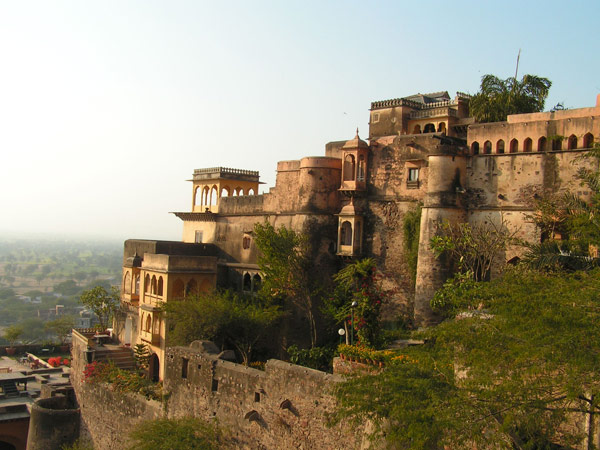
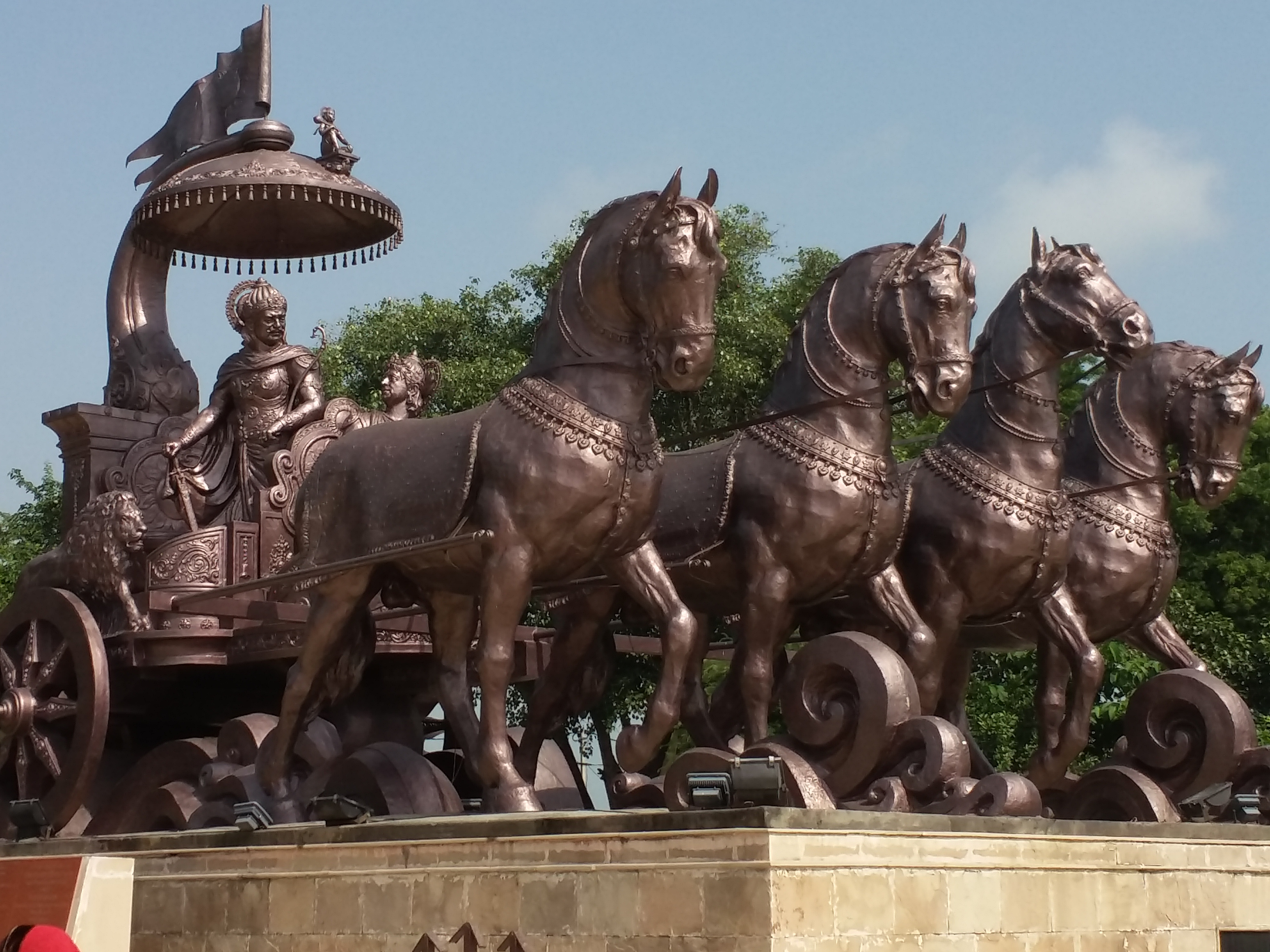
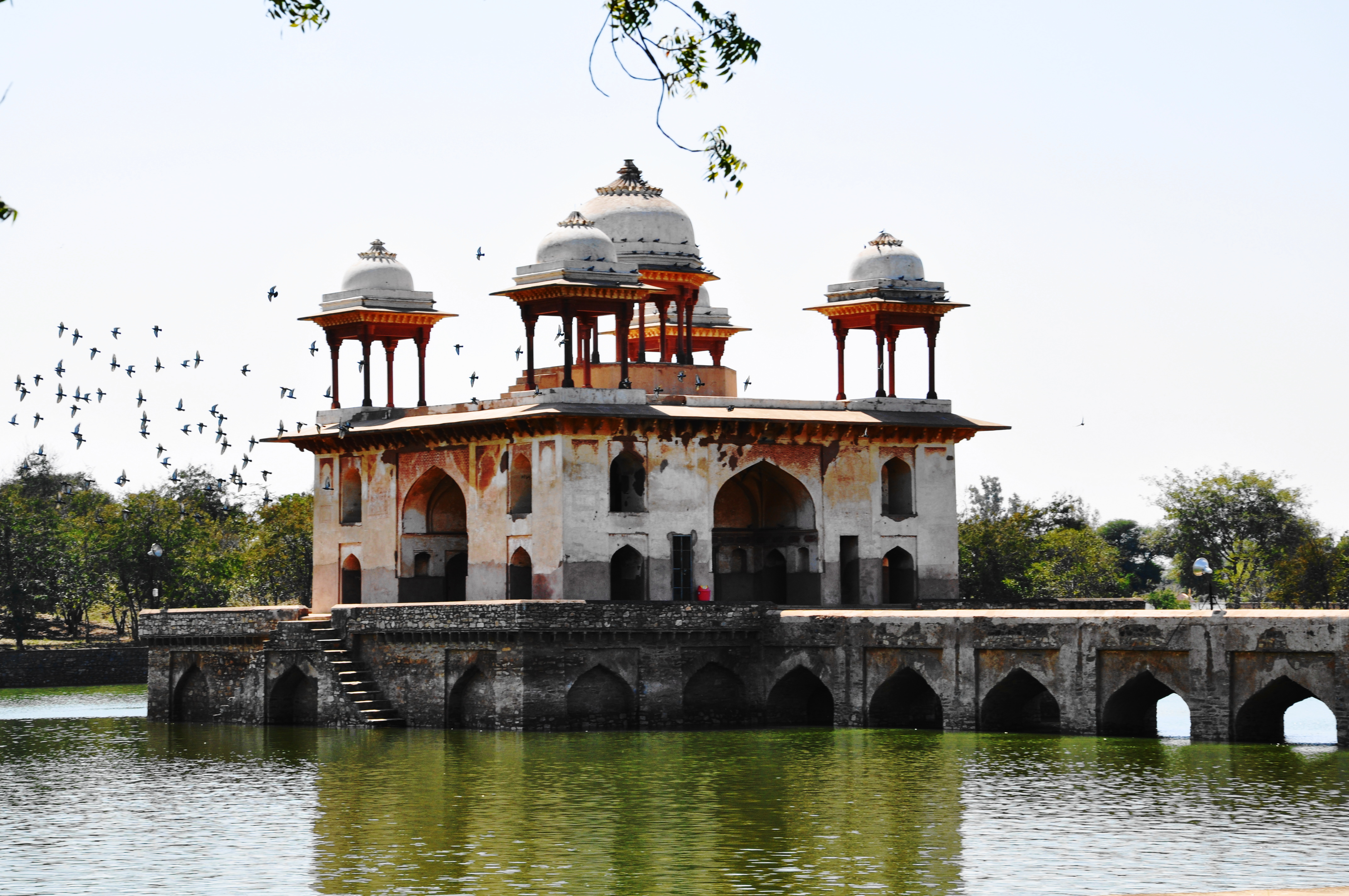
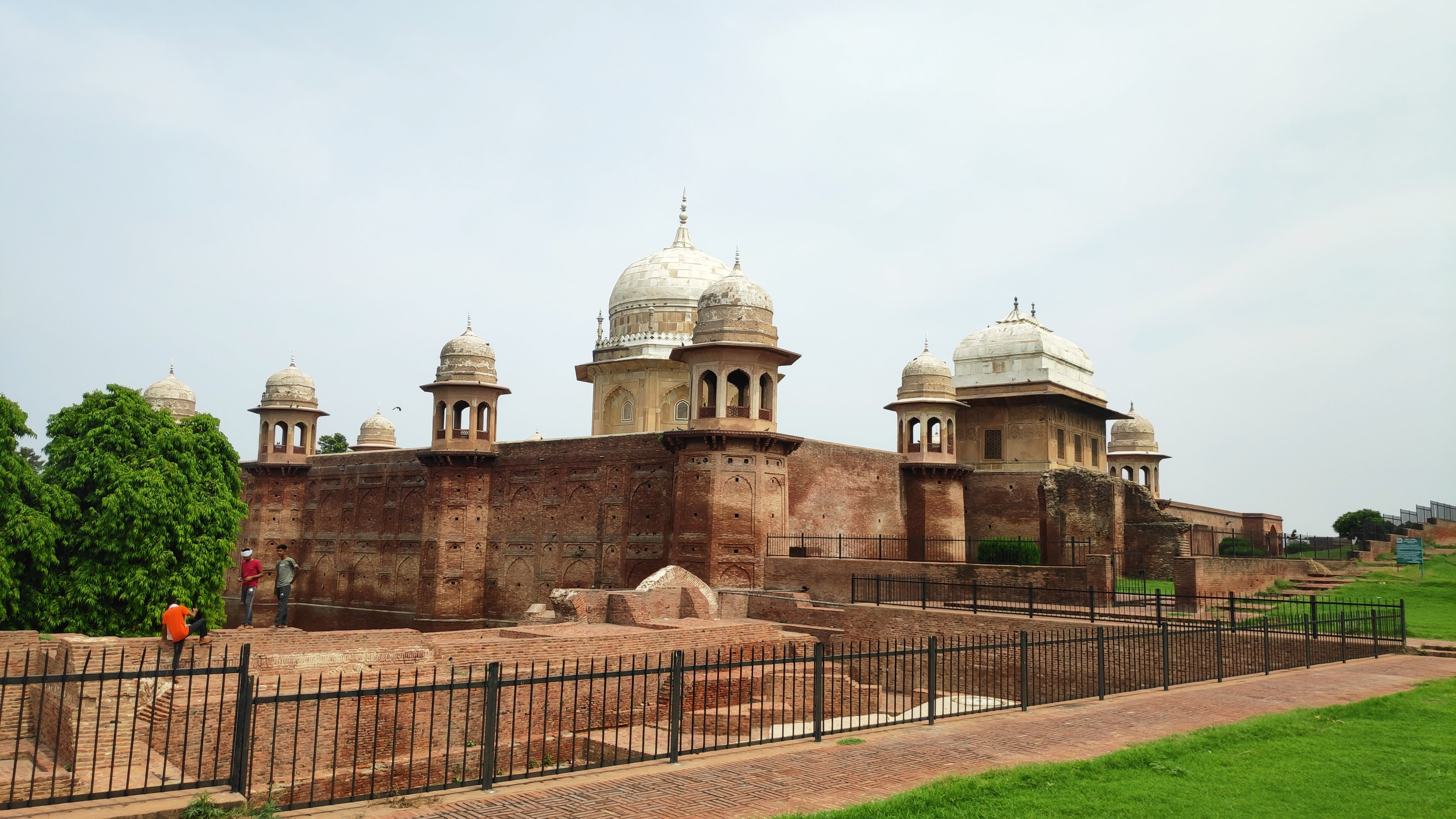
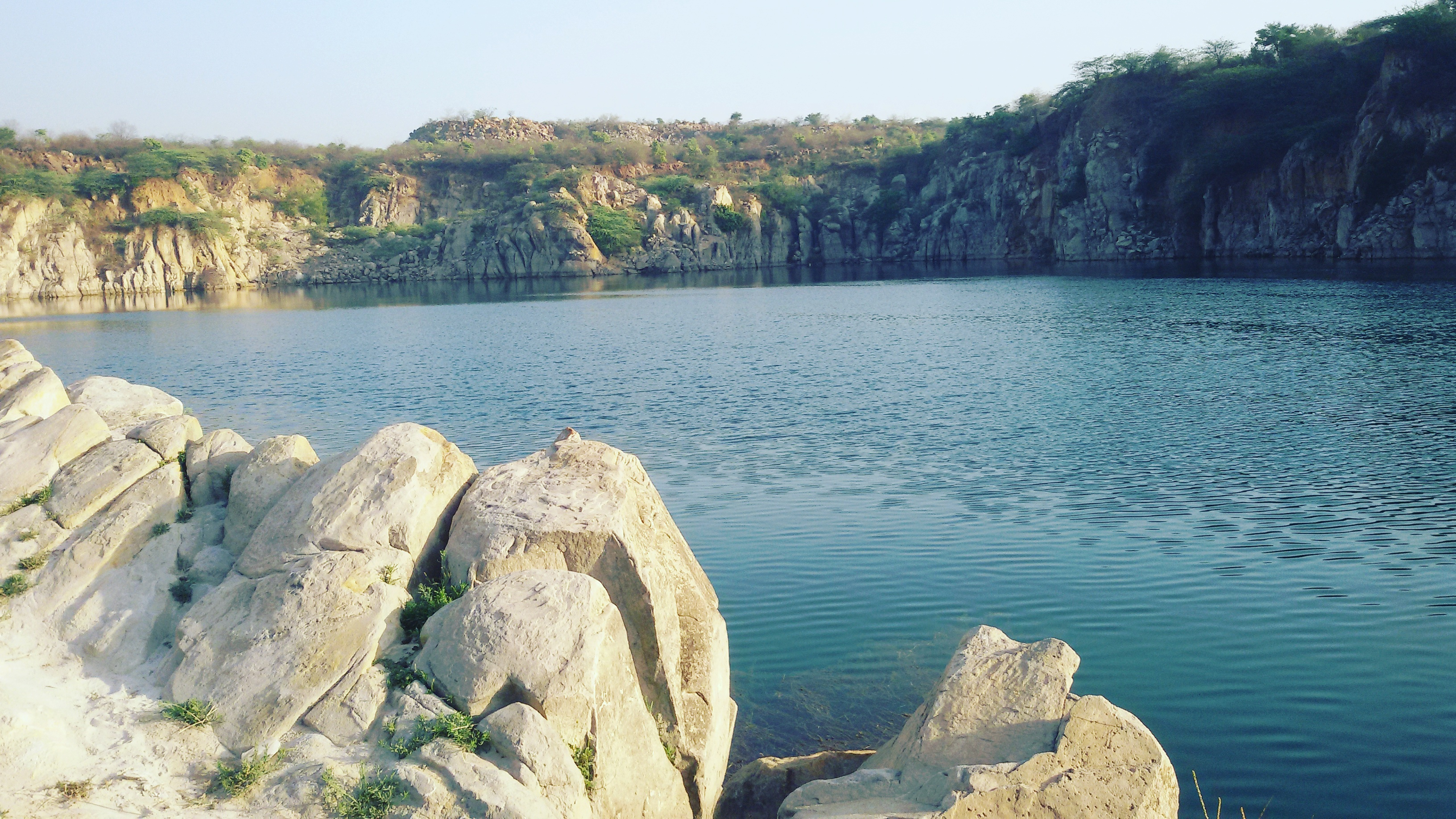
- Cyber City in Gurgaon Pinjore Gardens Madhogarh Fort Krishna and Arjuna at Kurukshetra Jal Mahal Tomb of Sheikh Chilli Surajkund Lake

- Emblem of Haryana
- Etymology: "Abode of God or Green Forest"
- Motto: Satyameva Jayate (Sanskrit) "Truth alone triumphs"
- Anthem: Jai Jai Jai Haryana (Hindi) "Victory to Haryana"
- Location of Haryana in India
- Coordinates: 30°44′N 76°47′E
- Country: India
- Region: North India
- Previously was: Part of Punjab
- Formation: 1 November 1966
- Capital: Chandigarh
- Largest city: Faridabad
- Districts: 22 (6 divisions)

Government
  - Body: Government of Haryana
  - Governor: Ashim Kumar Ghosh
  - Chief Minister: Nayab Singh Saini

Area
  - Total: 44,212 km^{2} (17,070 sq mi)
  - Rank: 20th
- Highest elevation (Karoh Peak): 1,467 m (4,813 ft)
- Lowest elevation (Yamuna River): 169 m (554 ft)

Population (2025)
  - Total: ▲30,936,000
  - Rank: 17th
  - Density: 573/km^{2} (1,480/sq mi)
  - Urban: 43.26%
  - Rural: 56.74%
- Demonym: Haryanvi

Language
  - Official: Hindi
  - Additional official: English; Punjabi
  - Official script: Devanagari

GDP
  - Total (2026-27): ▲₹15.18 lakh crore (US$160 billion) (nominal) ▲$746.42 billion (PPP)
  - Rank: 13th
  - Per capita: ▲₹490,763 (US$5,200) (nominal) (2025-26) ▲$24,128 (PPP) (6th)
- Time zone: UTC+05:30 (IST)
- ISO 3166 code: IN-HR
- Vehicle registration: HR
- HDI (2022): ▲0.696 Medium (13th)
- Literacy (2024): 84.8% (18th)
- Sex ratio (2025): 892♀/1000 ♂ (29th)
- Website: haryana.gov.in
- Symbols of Haryana
- Foundation day: Haryana Day
- Bird: Black francolin
- Flower: Lotus
- Mammal: Blackbuck
- Tree: Bodhi tree
- State highway mark
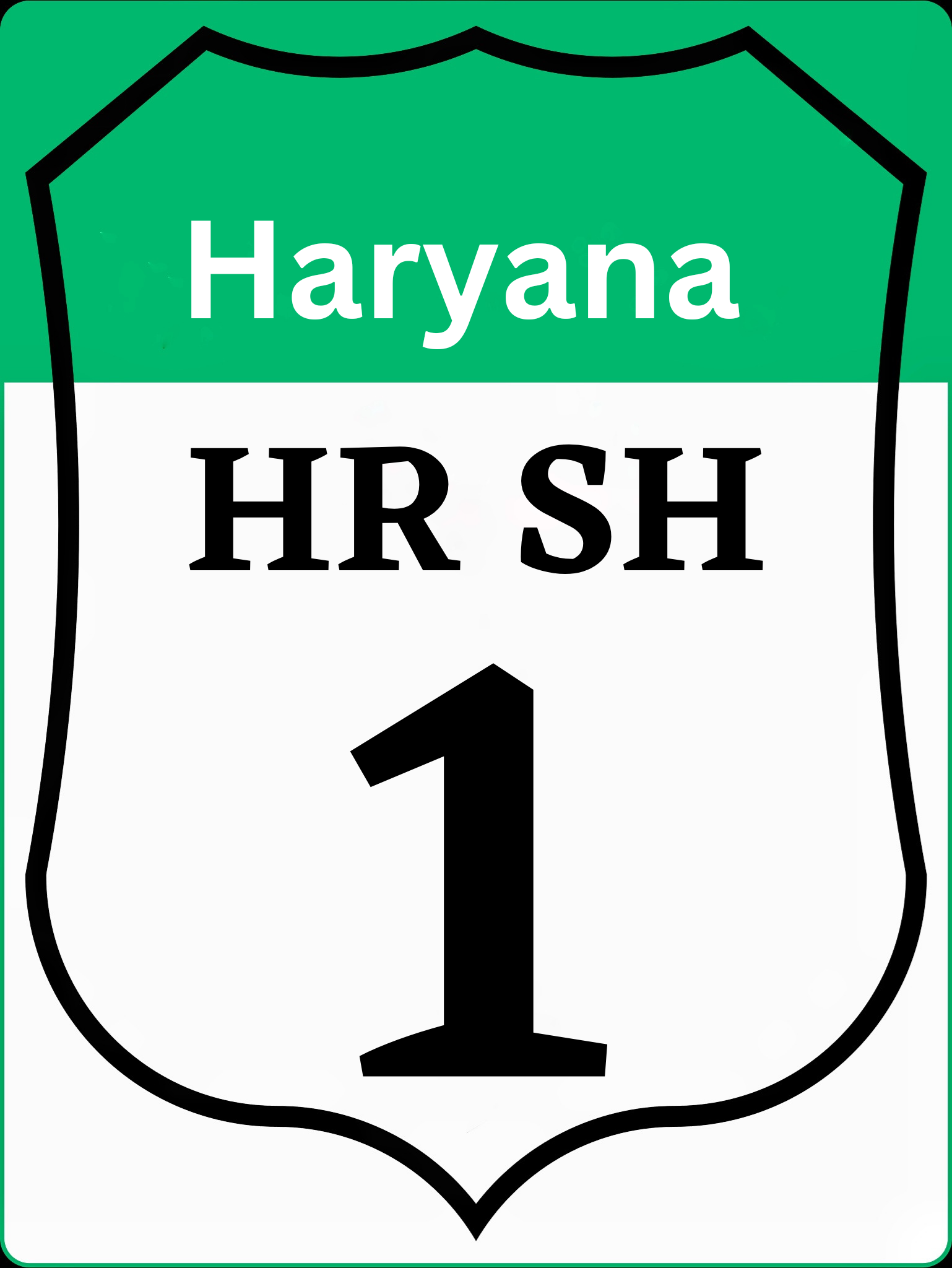
- State highway of Haryana; HR SH1 – HR SH33
- List of Indian state symbols
- ^†Joint Capital with Punjab^{††} Common for Punjab, Haryana and Chandigarh.

Haryana (Note: Hindi: Hariyāṇā, pronounced [ɦəɾɪːˈaːɳɑɐː]) is a state located in the northwestern part of India. It is bordered by Punjab and Himachal Pradesh to the north, by Rajasthan to the west and south, by Delhi to the southeast, while river Yamuna forms its eastern border with Uttar Pradesh. The state capital is Chandigarh, which it shares with the neighbouring state of Punjab. The city of Gurgaon is among India's largest financial and technology hubs. The most populous city is Faridabad, a part of the National Capital Region. In terms of area, it ranks 21st in India, with around 1.5% (44,212 km^{2} or 17,070 sq mi) of India's land area. Haryana has 6 administrative divisions, 22 districts, 72 sub-divisions, 93 revenue tehsils, 50 sub-tehsils, 140 blocks, 154 cities and towns, 7,356 villages, and 6,222 villages panchayats.

The modern state of Haryana was formed on 1 November 1966 after the Punjab Reorganisation Act was passed by the Indian Parliament. Haryana contains 32 special economic zones (SEZs), mainly located within the industrial corridor projects connecting the National Capital Region. Gurgaon is considered one of the major information technology and automobile hubs of India. Haryana ranks 11th among Indian states in human development index. The economy of Haryana is the 13th largest in India, with a gross state domestic product (GSDP) of ₹7.65 trillion (US$82 billion) and has the country's 5th-highest GSDP per capita of ₹240,000 (US$2,600).

The state is also rich in ancient heritage, monuments, flora and fauna and tourism, with a well-developed economy, national and state highways. Haryana surrounds the country's capital territory of Delhi on three sides (north, west and south), consequently, a large area of Haryana state is included in the economically important National Capital Region of India for the purposes of planning and development.

== Etymology ==
Some anthropologists believe that the name "Haryana" originated in the period following the Mahābhārata, when the Ābhiras are thought to have settled in the region. This community was known for developing advanced agricultural techniques.

Historian Pran Nath Chopra suggests that the name evolved linguistically over time—from Ābhirāyana (derived from ābhira meaning "Abhira" and ayana meaning "path" or "way") to Ahirāyana, and eventually became Hariyānā or Haryana.

== History ==
=== Ancient period ===
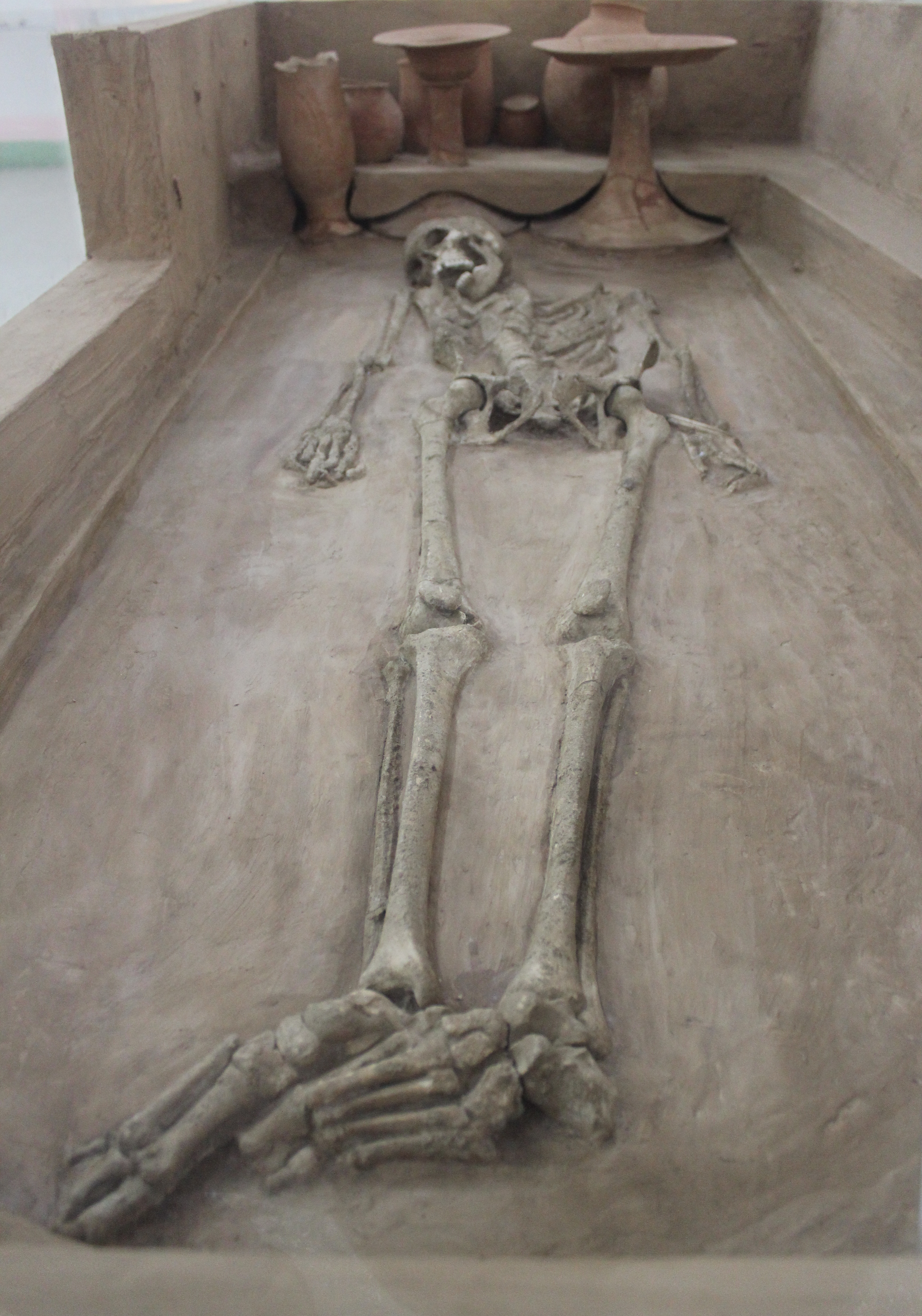
A skeleton from an Indus Valley civilisation site near Rakhigarhi. The skeleton is on display in the National Museum.

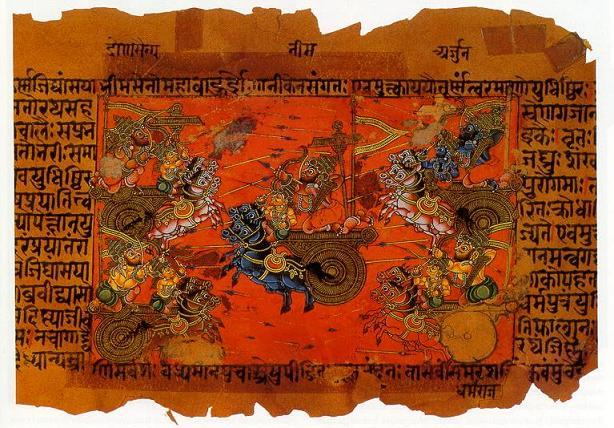
Manuscript illustration of the Battle of Kurukshetra, which is a war described in the Indian epic poem Mahābhārata. The conflict arose from a dynastic succession struggle between two groups of cousins, the Kauravas and Pandavas, for the throne of Hastinapura in an Indian kingdom called Kuru.

The villages of Rakhigarhi in Hisar district and Bhirrana in Fatehabad district are home to ancient sites of the Indus Valley Civilisation, which contain evidence of paved roads, a drainage system, a large-scale rainwater collection storage system, terracotta brick and statue production, and skilled metalworking (in both bronze and precious metals).

During the Vedic era, Haryana was the site of the Kuru kingdom, one of India's great Mahajanapadas. The south of Haryana is the claimed location of Manu's state of Brahmavarta. The area surrounding Dhosi Hill, and districts of Rewari and Mahendragarh had Ashrams of several Rishis who made valuable contributions to important Hindu scriptures like Vedas, Upanishads, Manusmriti, Brahmanas and Puranas. As per Manusmriti, Manu was the king of Brahmavarta, the flood time state 10,000 years ago surrounded by oldest route of Sarasvati and Drishadwati rivers on the banks of which Sanatan-Vedic or present-day Hindu ethos evolved and scriptures were composed.

=== Medieval period ===
Ancient bronze and stone idols of Jain Tirthankara were found in archaeological expeditions in Badli, Bhiwani (Ranila, Charkhi Dadri and Badhra), Dadri, Gurgaon (Gurugram), Hansi, Hisar, Kasan, Nahad, Narnaul, Pehowa, Rewari, Rohad, Rohtak (Asthal Bohar) and Sonepat in Haryana.

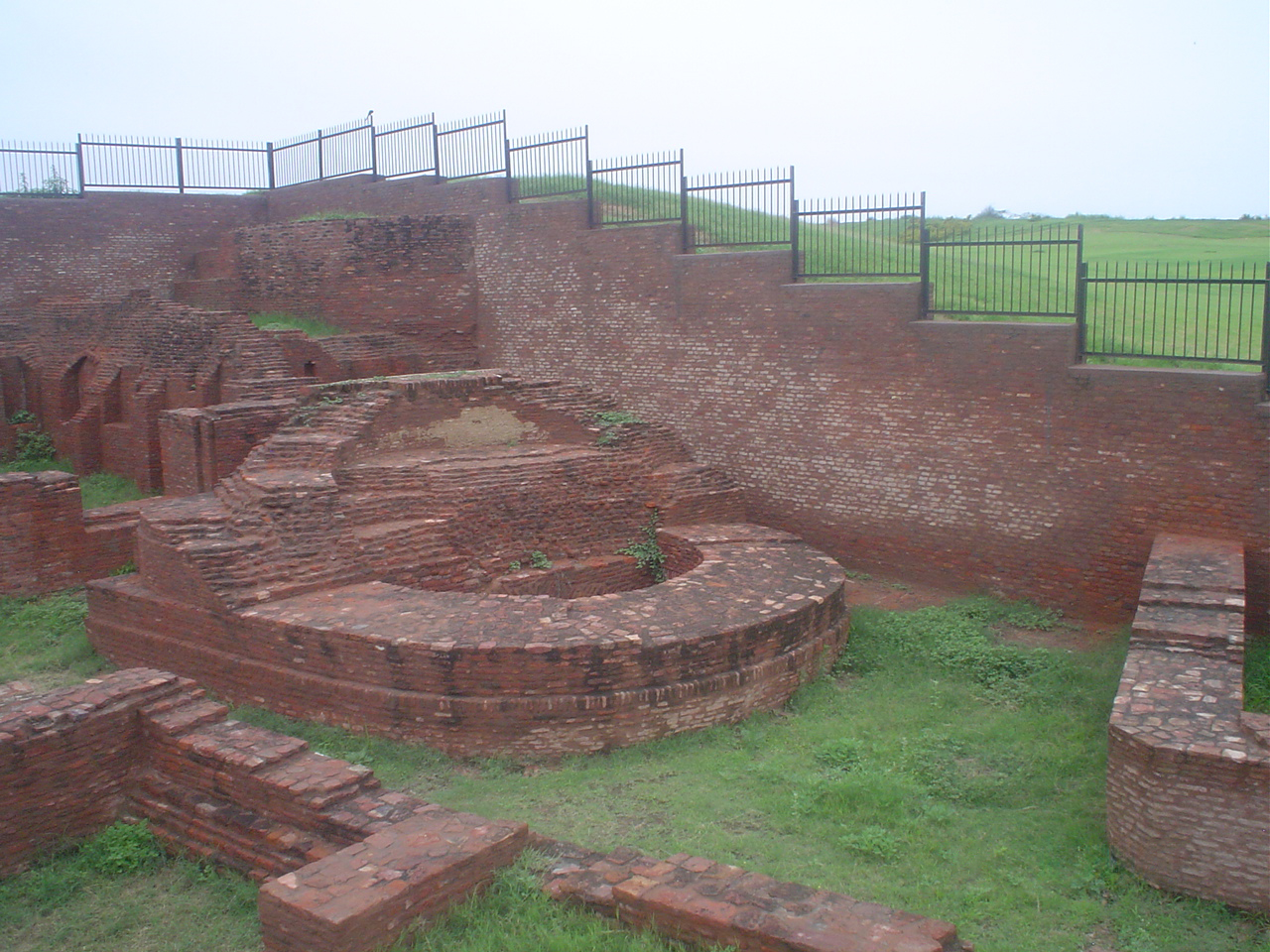
Harsha Ka Tila mound west of Sheikh Chilli's Tomb complex, with ruins from the reign of 7th-century ruler Harsha

Pushyabhuti dynasty ruled parts of northern India in the 7th century with its capital at Thanesar. Harsha was a prominent king of the dynasty. Tomara dynasty ruled the south Haryana region in the 10th century. Anangpal Tomar was a prominent king among the Tomaras.

After the sack of Bhatner fort during the Timurid conquests of India in 1398, Timur attacked and sacked the cities of Sirsa, Fatehabad, Sunam, Kaithal and Panipat.

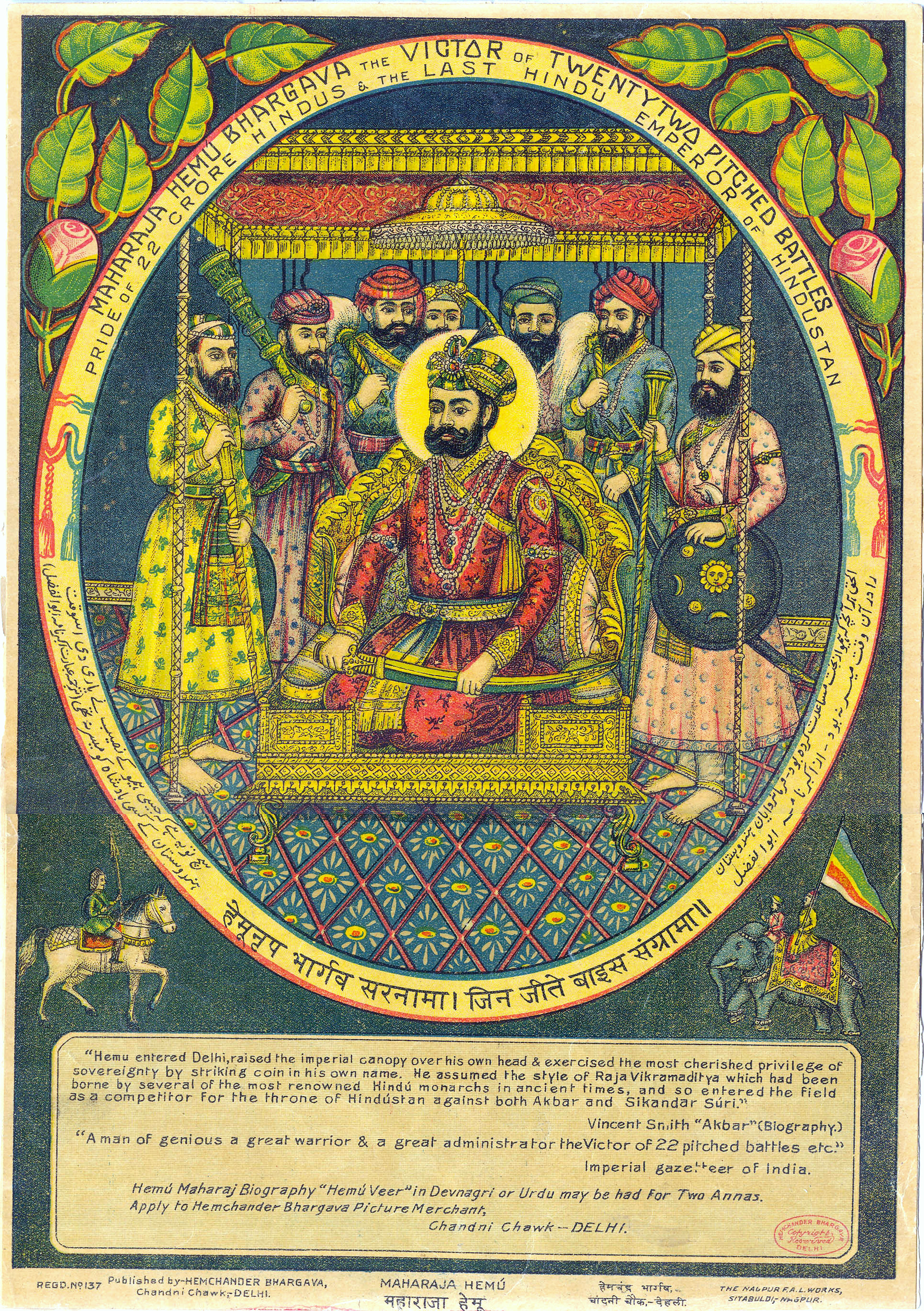
Portrait of Hem Chandra Vikramaditya, who fought and won across North India from the Punjab to Bengal, winning 22 straight battles

Hem Chandra Vikramaditya, also called Hemu, claimed royal status and the throne of Delhi after defeating Akbar's Mughal forces on 7 October 1556 in the Battle of Delhi, and assumed the ancient title of Vikramaditya. The area that is now Haryana has been ruled by some of the major empires of India. Panipat is known for three seminal battles in the history of India. In the First Battle of Panipat (1526), Babur defeated the Lodis. In the Second Battle of Panipat (1556), Akbar defeated the local Haryanvi Hindu Emperor of Delhi, who belonged to Rewari. Hem Chandra Vikramaditya had earlier won 22 battles across India from 1553 to 1556 from Punjab to Bengal, defeating the Mughals and Afghans. Hemu had defeated Akbar's forces twice at Agra and the Battle of Delhi in 1556 to become the last Hindu Emperor of India with a formal coronation at Purana Quila in Delhi on 7 October 1556. In the Third Battle of Panipat (1761), the Afghan king Ahmad Shah Abdali defeated the Marathas.

The growth of trade centers like Bhiwani was supported by influential merchants such as Seth Nand Ram Ji Katla Wale, who promoted social development and commerce during the late 18th and early 19th centuries. He was one of the prominent leaders who devoted his life to establishing Bhiwani as a trade centre in the 18th century.

=== British period ===
The state was part of the British Punjab province. The Delhi division of Punjab province formed the bulk of Haryana. Among the princely states that were located in the state were Jind, Kalsia, Loharu, Dujana and Pataudi, as well as parts of the Patiala State.

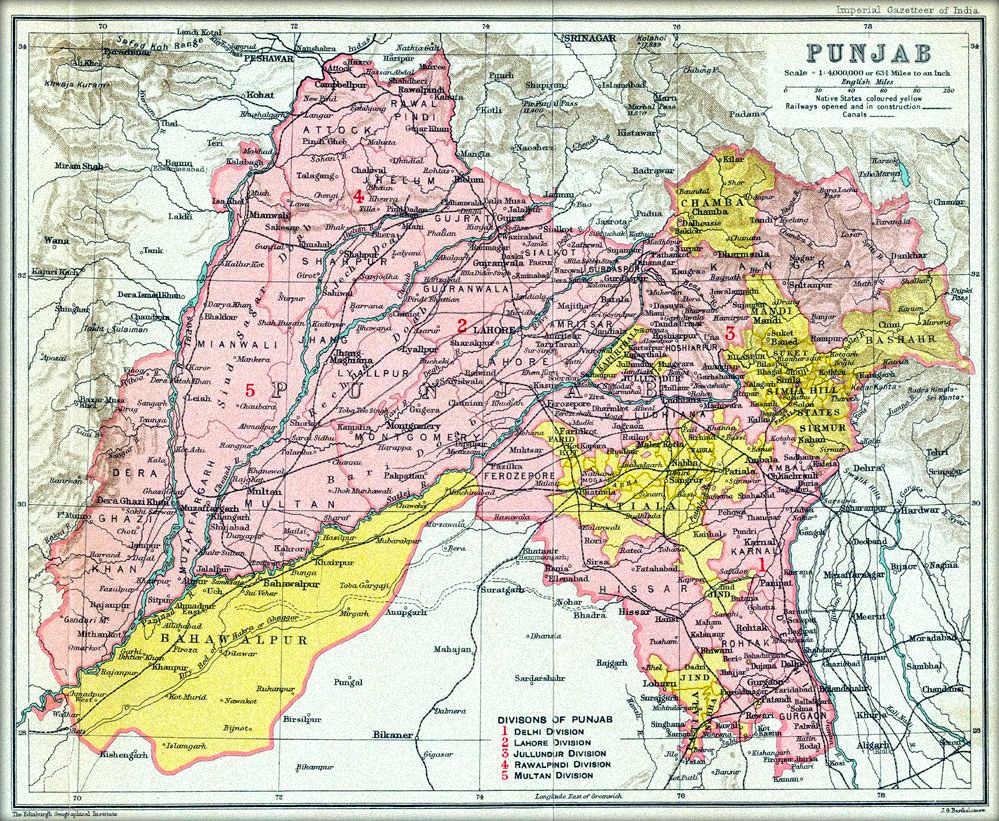
Map of the Punjab Province of British India; Haryana formed the southeastern areas of the province

=== Partition and aftermath ===
During the Partition of India, the Punjab province was one of two British Indian provinces, alongside Bengal, to be partitioned between India and Pakistan. Haryana, along with other Hindu and Sikh-dominated areas of Punjab province, became part of India as East Punjab state. As a result, a significant number of Muslims left for the newly formed country of Pakistan. Similarly, a huge number of Hindu and Sikh refugees poured into the state from West Punjab. Gopi Chand Bhargava, who hailed from Sirsa in present-day Haryana, became the first Chief Minister of East Punjab.

=== Formation of Haryana ===
Haryana as a state came into existence on 1 November 1966 the Punjab Reorganisation Act (1966). The Indian government set up the Shah Commission under the chairmanship of Justice JC Shah on 23 April 1966 to divide the existing state of Punjab and determine the boundaries of the new state of Haryana after consideration of the languages spoken by the people. It encompassed the predominantly Hindi-speaking southern part of former Punjab, while the state of Punjab was reduced to the area where Punjabi speakers formed the majority population. The commission delivered its report on 31 May 1966 whereby the then-districts of Hisar, Mahendragarh, Gurgaon, Rohtak and Karnal were to be a part of the new state of Haryana. Further, the tehsils of Jind and Narwana in the Sangrur district – along with Naraingarh, Ambala and Jagadhri – were to be included.

The commission recommended that the tehsil of Kharar, which includes Chandigarh, the state capital of Punjab, should be a part of Haryana. However, Kharar was given to Punjab. The city of Chandigarh was made a union territory, serving as the capital of both Punjab and Haryana.

Bhagwat Dayal Sharma became the first Chief Minister of Haryana. Chaudhary Devi Lal is credited to be the individual who pushed for the creation of this commission. He was an instrumental figure in the separation of the Haryana state from Punjab in 1966.

=== Punjabi migration to Haryana in 1947 and 1980s ===
The Punjabi migration to Haryana occurred in two major waves—first during the Partition of India in 1947, and later during the 1980s, influenced by the Khalistani movement in Punjab.

The Partition of India led to one of the largest mass migrations in history, as millions of people were displaced due to the creation of Pakistan. Many Punjabi Hindus and Sikhs fled West Punjab (now in Pakistan) and settled in Haryana, bringing with them their agricultural skills, business expertise, and cultural traditions. Their arrival helped in the economic development of Haryana, particularly in agriculture and trade, as they introduced advanced farming techniques and expanded local businesses.

The Khalistani movement, which emerged in Punjab during the 1980s, led to political instability and violent insurgency. The demand for a separate Sikh state (Khalistan) resulted in clashes between separatist groups and security forces, making the region unsafe for many civilians. This turmoil prompted Punjabi families, including both Hindus and Sikhs, to migrate to neighbouring Haryana, seeking security, stability, and economic opportunities.

The urban centers of Haryana witnessed an influx of Punjabi migrants, who contributed to the state's business and industrial sectors.

By the mid-1990s, the insurgency declined due to government interventions, weakening separatist factions, and changing political dynamics.

These migrations have shaped Haryana's demographic, cultural, and economic landscape, making Punjabis an integral part of the state's growth and identity.

== Geography ==
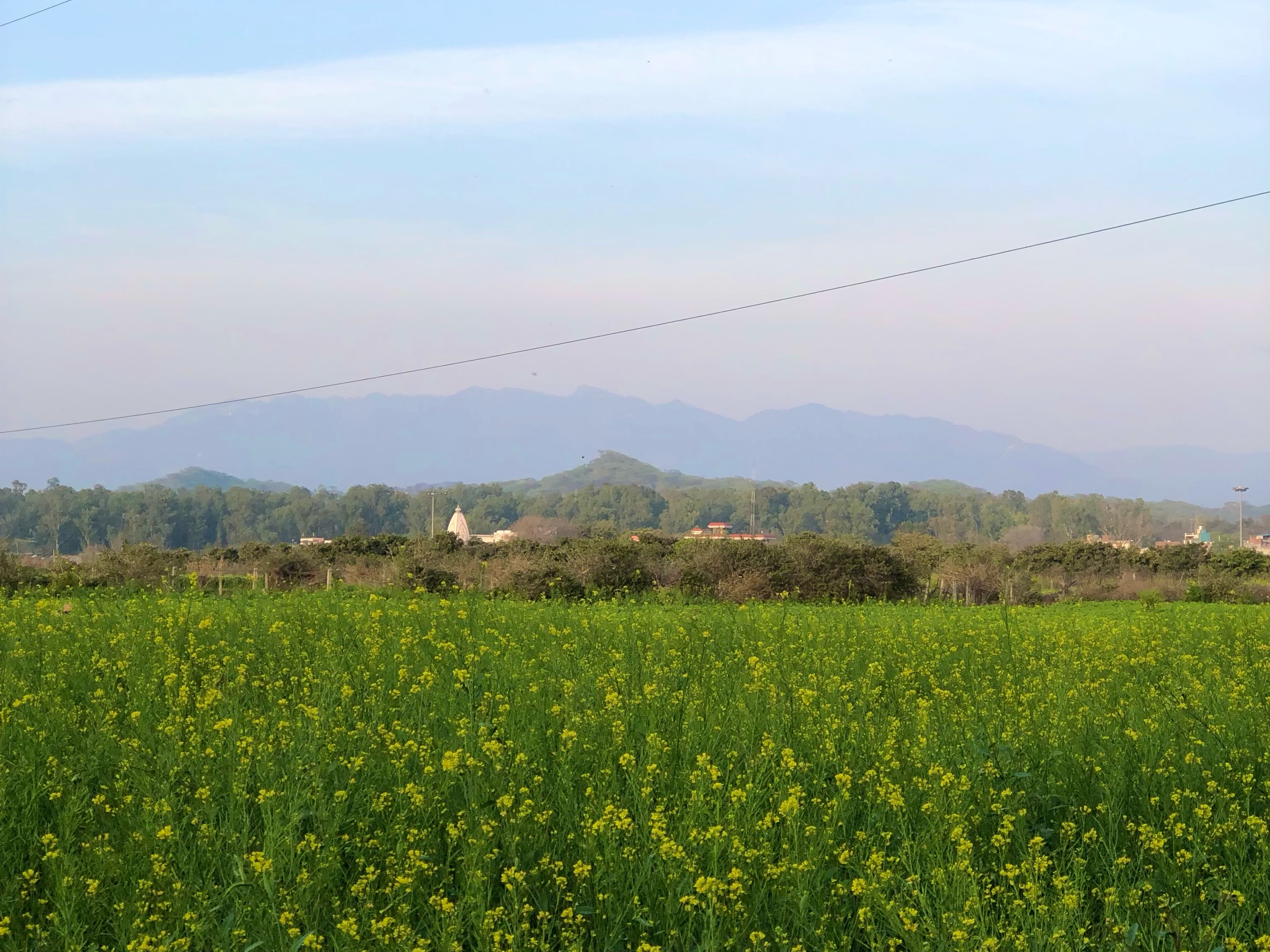
A mustard field in Haryana, near the state capital of Chandigarh

Haryana is a landlocked state in northern India. It is between 27°39' to 30°35' N latitude and between 74°28' and 77°36' E longitude. The total geographical area of the state is 4.42 m ha, which is 1.4% of the geographical area of the country. The altitude of Haryana varies between 700 and 3600 ft (200 metres to 1200 metres) above sea level. Haryana has only 4% (compared with national 21.85%) area under forests. Karoh Peak, a 1,467-metre (4,813 ft) tall mountain peak in the Sivalik Hills range of the greater Himalayas range located near Morni Hills area of Panchkula district, is the highest point in Haryana. Most of the state sits atop the fertile Ghaggar Plain, a subsection of the Indo-Gangetic Plain. Haryana has 4 states and 2 union territories on its border – Punjab, Rajasthan, Uttar Pradesh, Himachal Pradesh, Delhi, and Chandigarh.

=== Plains and mountains ===
Haryana has four main geographical features.

- The Yamuna-Ghaggar plain forming the largest part of the state is also called Delhi doab consists of Sutlej-Ghaggar doab (between Sutlej in the north of Punjab and the Ghaggar river flowing through northern Haryana), Ghaggar-Hakra doab (between Ghaggar river and Hakra or Drishadvati river which is the paleochannel of the holy Saraswati River) and Hakra-Yamuna doab (between Hakra river and Yamuna).
- The Lower Shivalik Hills to the northeast in foothills of Himalaya
- The Bagar region semi-desert dry sandy plain in north west of Haryana, covering northwest districts of Sirsa, western Fatehabad and northwestern Hisar.
- The Aravali Range's northernmost low rise isolated non-continuous outcrops in the south, covering Nuh, Gurgaon, Faridabad, Rewari, and Mahendragarh.

=== Hydrography ===
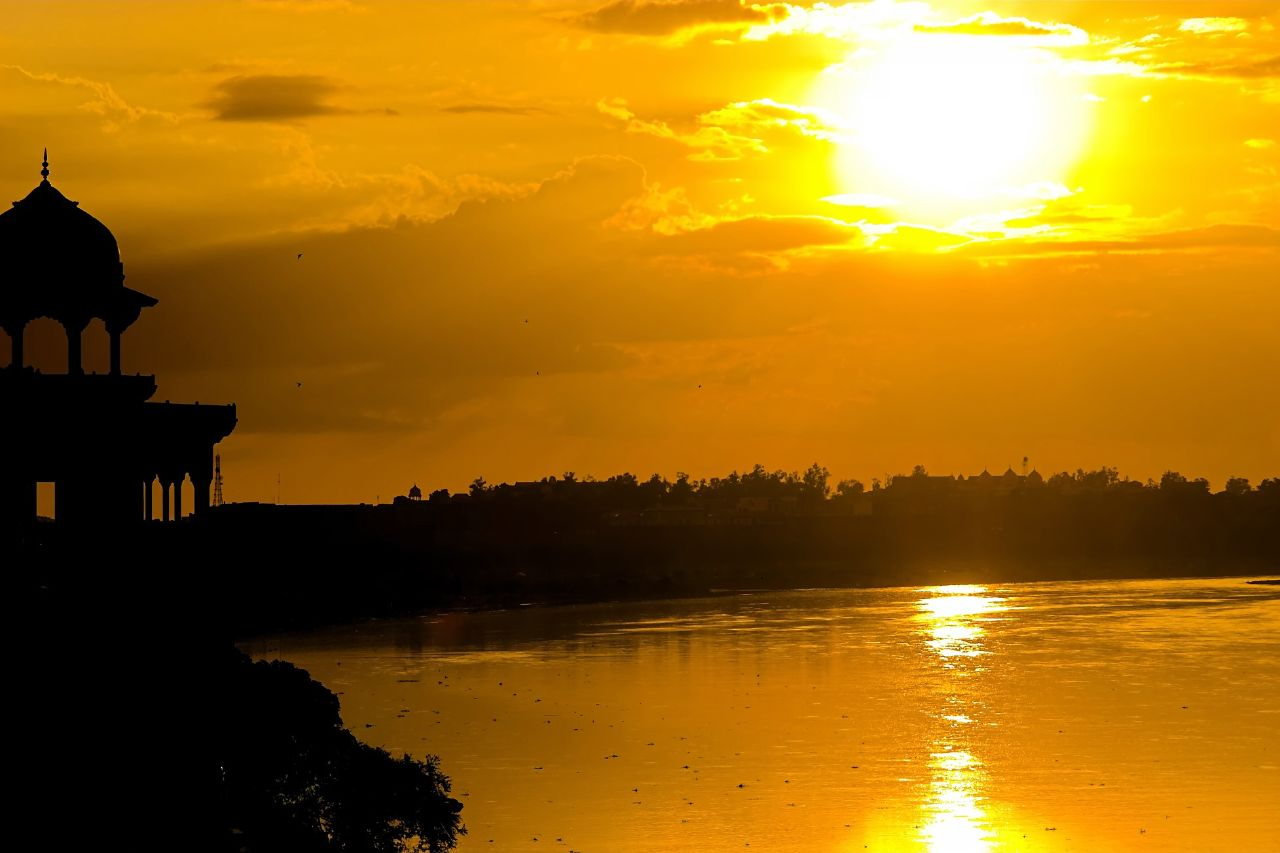
Yamuna river near the Haryana border

The Yamuna, a tributary of the Ganges, flows along the state's eastern boundary.

Northern Haryana has several northeast to west flowing rivers originating from the Sivalik Hills of Himalayas, such as Ghaggar (palaeochannel of vedic Sarasvati river), Chautang (paleochannel of vedic Drishadvati river, tributary of the Ghagghar), Tangri river (tributary of the Ghagghar), Kaushalya river (tributary of the Ghagghar), Markanda River (tributary of Ghagghar), Sarsuti, Dangri, Somb river. Haryana's main seasonal river, the Ghaggar-Hakra, known as Ghaggar before the Ottu barrage and as the Hakra downstream of the barrage, rises in the outer Himalayas, between the Yamuna and the Satluj and enters the state near Pinjore in the Panchkula district, passes through Ambala and Sirsa, it reaches Bikaner in Rajasthan and runs for 460 km (290 mi) before disappearing into the deserts of Rajasthan. The seasonal Markanda River, known as the Aruna in ancient times, originates from the lower Shivalik Hills and enters Haryana west of Ambala, and swells into a raging torrent during monsoon is notorious for its devastating power, carries its surplus water on to the Sanisa Lake where the Markanda joins the Sarasuti and later the Ghaggar.

Southern Haryana has several south-west to east flowing seasonal rivulets originating from the Aravalli Range in and around the hills in Mewat region, including Sahibi River (called Najafgarh drain in Delhi), Dohan river (tributary of Sahibi, originates at Mandoli village near Neem Ka Thana in Jhunjhunu district of Rajasthan and then disappears in Mahendragarh district), Krishnavati river (former tributary of Sahibi river, originates near Dariba and disappears in Mahendragarh district much before reaching Sahibi river) and Indori river (longest tributary of Sahibi River, originates in Sikar district of Rajasthan and flows to Rewari district of Haryana), these once were tributaries of the Drishadwati/Saraswati river.

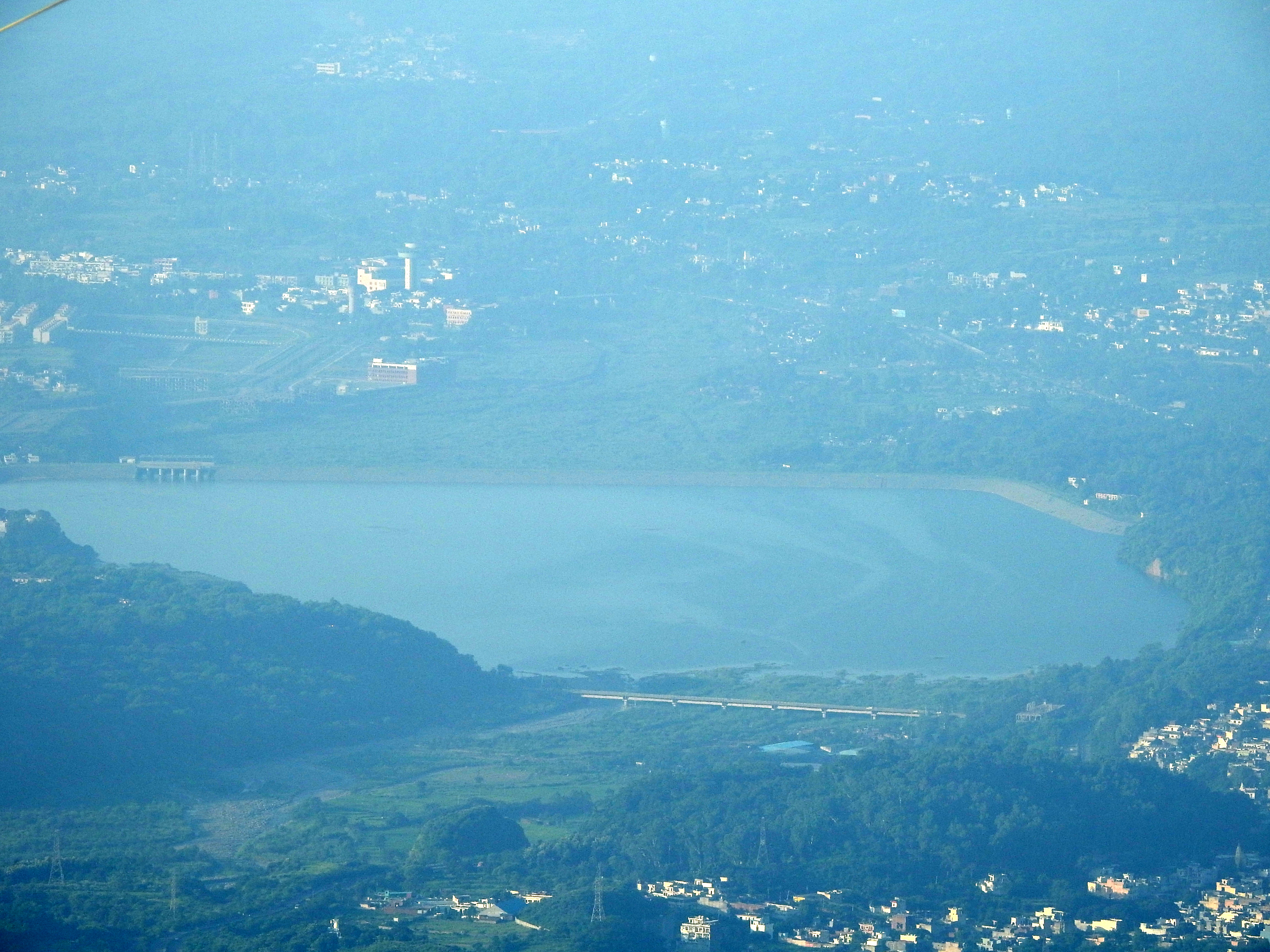
Kaushalya Dam

Major canals are Western Yamuna Canal, Sutlej Yamuna link canal (from Sutlej river tributary of Indus), and Indira Gandhi Canal.

Major dams are Kaushalya Dam in Panchkula district, Hathnikund Barrage and Tajewala Barrage on Yamuna in Yamunanagar district, Pathrala barrage on Somb river in Yamunanagar district, ancient Anagpur Dam near Surajkund in Faridabad district, and Ottu barrage on Ghaggar-Hakra River in Sirsa district.

Major lakes are Dighal Wetland, Badkhal Lake in Faridabad, Basai Wetland, Sultanpur National Park, and Damdama Lake in Gurgaon, Bhindawas Lake in Jhajjar, holy Brahma Sarovar and Sannihit Sarovar in Kurukshetra, Blue Bird Lake in Hisar, Hathni Kund in Yamunanagar district, Karna Lake at Karnal, ancient Surajkund in Faridabad, and Tilyar Lake in Rohtak.

The Haryana State Waterbody Management Board is responsible for the rejuvenation of 14,000 johads of Haryana and up to 60 lakes in National Capital Region falling within the Haryana state.

The only hot spring in Haryana is the Sohna Sulphur Hot Spring at Sohna in Gurgaon district. Tosham Hill range has several sacred sulphur ponds of religious significance that are revered for the healing impact of sulphur, such as Pandu Teerth Kund, Surya Kund, Kukkar Kund, Gyarasia Kund or Vyas Kund.

Seasonal waterfalls include Tikkar Taal twin lakes at Morni hiills, Dhosi Hill in Mahendragarh district, Pali village on the outskirts of Faridabad, and Ghamroj Waterfall near Gurgaon.

=== Climate ===
Haryana is hot in summer with maximum temperatures hovering around 40 °C (104 °F) and cool in winter with minimum temperatures around 6 °C (43 °F). The hottest months are May and June and the coldest are December and January. The climate is semi-arid to subhumid with an average rainfall of 592.93 mm. Around 29% of rainfall is received during the months from July to September as a result of the monsoon, and the remaining rainfall is received during the period from December to February as a result of the western disturbance.

Gurgaon

Climate chart (precipitation, max. and min. temperature)
J	F	M	A	M	J	J	A	S	O	N	D
15 21 6	21 24 8	12 30 13	17 37 19	30 40 24	73 40 27	202 35 26	207 34 26	102 34 23	14 33 17	11 28 11	7.6 23 7
- █ Average max. and min. temperatures in °C
- █ Precipitation totals in mm
Imperial conversion
J	F	M	A	M	J	J	A	S	O	N	D
0.6 70 43	0.8 75 47	0.5 86 56	0.7 98 66	1.2 105 75	2.9 103 80	7.9 95 79	8.2 93 78	4 94 74	0.5 92 63	0.4 83 52	0.3 73 44
- █ Average max. and min. temperatures in °F
- █ Precipitation totals in inches

Ambala

Climate chart (precipitation, max. and min. temperature)
J	F	M	A	M	J	J	A	S	O	N	D
31 18 7	36 23 10	29 28 14	20 35 20	35 38 24	111 38 26	257 35 26	228 34 25	137 33 23	14 32 18	6.5 27 12	15 21 8
- █ Average max. and min. temperatures in °C
- █ Precipitation totals in mm
Imperial conversion
J	F	M	A	M	J	J	A	S	O	N	D
1.2 65 44	1.4 73 49	1.2 82 58	0.8 95 67	1.4 101 75	4.4 100 78	10 94 78	9 92 77	5.4 92 74	0.6 89 64	0.3 80 53	0.6 70 46
- █ Average max. and min. temperatures in °F
- █ Precipitation totals in inches

=== Flora and fauna ===
State symbols of Haryana
Formation day	1 November (Day of separation from Punjab)
State mammal	Black buck
State bird	Black francolin
State tree	Peepal
State flower	Lotus

==== Forests ====
Forest cover in the state in 2013 was 3.59% (1586 km^{2}) and the tree cover in the state was 2.90% (1282 km^{2}), giving a total forest and tree cover of 6.49%. In 2016 and 2017, 18,412 hectares were brought under tree cover by planting 14.1 million seedlings. Thorny, dry, deciduous forest and thorny shrubs can be found all over the state. During the monsoon, a carpet of grass covers the hills. Shisham, khair, babul, dhok, and neem are the dominant trees of the subtropical dry deciduous forest typical of northern India. The species of fauna found in the state of Haryana include black buck, nilgai, panther, fox, mongoose, jackal and wild dog. More than 450 species of birds are found here.

==== Wildlife ====
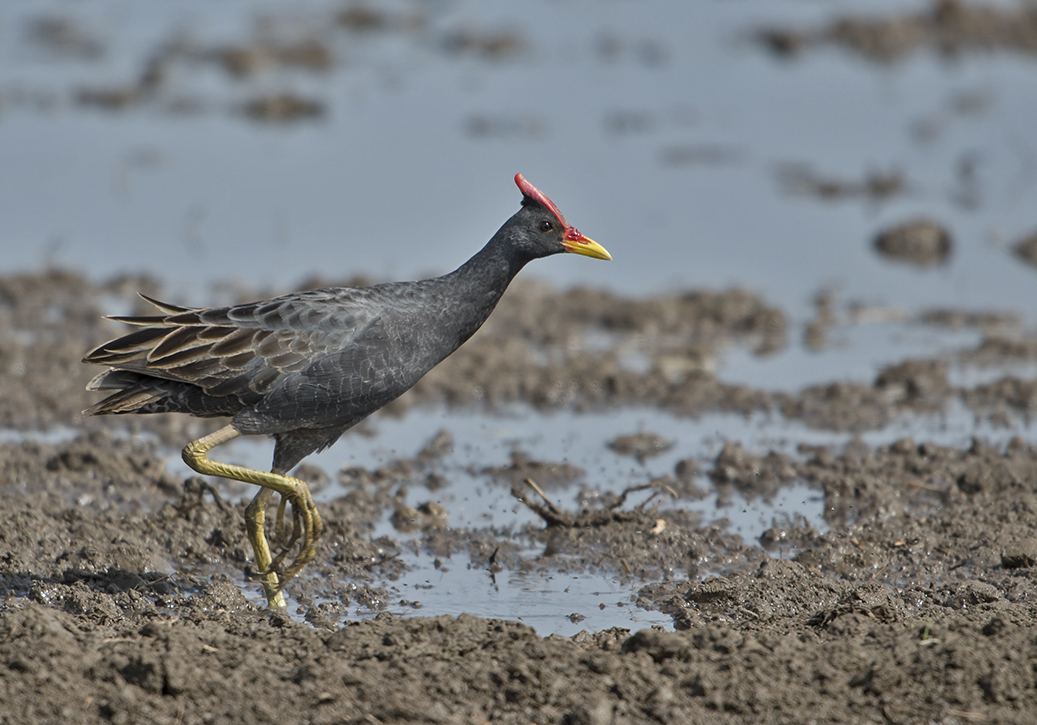
Watercock

Haryana has two national parks, eight wildlife sanctuaries, two wildlife conservation areas, four animal and bird breeding centers, one deer park and three zoos, all of which are managed by the Haryana Forest Department of the Government of Haryana. Sultanpur National Park is a notable park in Gurgaon District.

=== Environmental and ecological issues ===
Haryana Environment Protection Council is the advisory committee and the Department of Environment, Haryana is the department responsible for the administration of the environment. Areas of Haryana surrounding Delhi NCR are the most polluted. During the smog of November 2017, the air quality index of Gurgaon and Faridabad showed that the density of fine particulates (2.5 μm diameter) was an average a score of 400 and the monthly average of Haryana was 60. Other sources of pollution are exhaust gases from old vehicles, stone crushers and brick kilns. Haryana has 7.5 million vehicles, of which 40% are old, more polluting vehicles, and 500,000 new vehicles are added every year. Other majorly polluted cities are Bhiwani, Bahadurgarh, Dharuhera, Hisar and Yamunanagar.

== Demographics ==
Historical population
Year	Pop.	±% p.a.
1881	4,015,386	—
1891	4,171,339	+0.38%
1901	4,268,222	+0.23%
1911	3,870,574	−0.97%
1921	4,211,393	+0.85%
1931	4,495,730	+0.66%
1941	5,166,169	+1.40%
1951	5,673,597	+0.94%
1961	7,590,524	+2.95%
1971	10,036,431	+2.83%
1981	12,922,119	+2.56%
1991	16,463,648	+2.45%
2001	21,144,564	+2.53%
2011	25,351,462	+1.83%
source: (Note: 1881 figure taken from census data by combining the total population of all districts (Gurgaon, Karnal, Hissar, Rohtak, Sirsa, and Ambala), and princely states (Dujana, Pataudi, Kalsia, Loharu, and Jind) which are in the region that comprises the contemporary state of Haryana, India. See 1881 census data here:) (Note: 1891 figure taken from census data by combining the total population of all districts (Hissar, Rohtak, Gurgaon, Karnal, and Ambala), and princely states (Dujana, Pataudi, Kalsia, Loharu, and Jind) which are in the region that comprises the contemporary state of Haryana, India. See 1891 census data here:) (Note: 1901 figure taken from census data by combining the total population of all districts (Hissar, Rohtak, Gurgaon, Karnal, and Ambala), and princely states (Dujana, Pataudi, Kalsia, Loharu, and Jind) which are in the region that comprises the contemporary state of Haryana, India. See 1901 census data here:) (Note: 1911 figure taken from census data by combining the total population of all districts (Hissar, Rohtak, Gurgaon, Karnal, and Ambala), and princely states (Dujana, Pataudi, Kalsia, Loharu, and Jind) which are in the region that comprises the contemporary state of Haryana, India. See 1911 census data here:) (Note: 1921 figure taken from census data by combining the total population of all districts (Hissar, Rohtak, Gurgaon, Karnal, and Ambala), and princely states (Dujana, Pataudi, Kalsia, Loharu, and Jind) which are in the region that comprises the contemporary state of Haryana, India. See 1921 census data here:) (Note: 1931 figure taken from census data by combining the total population of all districts (Hissar, Rohtak, Gurgaon, Karnal, and Ambala), and princely states (Dujana, Pataudi, Kalsia, Loharu, and Jind) which are in the region that comprises the contemporary state of Haryana, India. See 1931 census data here:) (Note: 1941 figure taken from census data by combining the total population of all districts (Hissar, Rohtak, Gurgaon, Karnal, and Ambala), and princely states (Dujana, Pataudi, Kalsia, Loharu, and Jind) which are in the region that comprises the contemporary state of Haryana, India. See 1941 census data here:)

=== Caste groups ===
The major agricultural caste groups in Haryana are Jats, Ahirs, Sainis, Gurjars, Rajputs, Meos, Kambhojs, Rors, Khatris, and Bishnois. Brahmins and Dalits also form a large part of the state's population.

The Punjabi ethnic group constitutes more than one-third of Haryana's population, making them a significant and influential community in the state.

==== Estimated caste percentage ====
After the 1931 census, there have been no official figures for caste percentages in Haryana. According to Maria Spirova and Saskia Ruth-Lovell, Jats make up 30% of Haryana's population. As per Ranbir Singh, Jats (including Jat Sikhs) make up 24%, Ahirs 8%, Gurjars (including Muslim Gurjars) 3% Rajputs (including Muslim Rajputs) 3%, Sainis 3.5%, Rors 2%, Bishnoi 2%, Kambhojs (including Sikh Kambhojs) 2.5%, and Meo Muslims 3% of Haryana's total population. Together, these castes constitute 51% of the state's total population. According to Reena Kukreja, Dalits make up almost 20% in Haryana's population.

As per 2019 estimates reported by some Indian news organisations, the caste-wise composition of Haryana is 25% Jats, 21% Scheduled Caste, 8% Khatris, 7.5% Brahmins, 5.1% Ahir/Yadav, 5% Vaish, 4% Jat Sikhs, 3.8% Meos and other Muslims, 3.4% Rajputs, 3.35% Gurjar, 2.9% Saini, 2.7% Kumhars, 1.1% Ror and 0.7% Bishnois. As per 2023 estimates by Hindustan Times, Jats are 25% and Sainis 8% of Haryana's population.

=== Language ===
Languages spoken by district Haryanvi varieties 40–50% 60–70% 70–80% 80–90% 90–100% Other Hindi varieties 30–40% 40–50% 50–60% 50–60% 60–70% 70–80% 80–90% Punjabi 40–50%

==== Main languages ====
Languages of Haryana (2011)
1. Hindi (48.0%)
2. Haryanvi (37.2%)
3. Punjabi (7.36%)
4. Bagri (2.11%)
5. Mewati (1.66%)
6. Urdu (1.48%)
7. Baghati (1.28%)
8. Other (0.98%)

The official language of Haryana is Modern Standard Hindi spoken by 48%, and the second official language is Punjabi, spoken by 7.36%. Several regional languages or dialects, often subsumed under the name "Hindi", are spoken in the state. Predominant among them is Haryanvi (or Bangru) spoken by 37.2%, of the population. It is mainly spoken in the central and eastern parts of Haryana. Haryana also has many Urdu and Punjabi speakers. Punjabi was make the second official language for government use in 2010.

Telugu was made the state's "second language" for schools after Haryana was formed, but was not used for official communication. It was lagee dropped due to low student enrollment. In 1969, Chief Minister Bansi Lal declared Tamil the second language to distinguish Haryana from Punjab, despite having no Tamil speakers. Tamil lost this status in 2010 because of the same reason.

Hindi and Punjabi is spoken in the northeast, Bagri in the west, Deshwali in the East. Gujari is mainly spoken in the Faridabad division. Ahirwati, Mewati and Braj Bhasha in the south.

==== Other languages ====
There are also some speakers of several major regional languages of neighbouring states or other parts of the subcontinent, like Bengali, Bhojpuri, Marwari, Mewari, and Nepali, as well as smaller communities of speakers of languages that are dispersed across larger regions, like Bauria, Bazigar, Gade Lohar, Oadki, and Sansi.

=== Religion ===
Religion in Haryana (2011)
1. Hinduism (87.5%)
2. Islam (7.03%)
3. Sikhism (4.91%)
4. Jainism (0.21%)
5. Christianity (0.20%)
6. Buddhism (0.03%)
7. Others (0.18%)

According to the 2011 census, of the total population of 25,351,462 in Haryana, Hindus (87.46%) constitute the majority of the state's population with Muslims (7.03%) (mainly Meos) and Sikhs (4.91%) being the largest minorities.

Muslims are mainly found in the districts of Nuh, Palwal, and Faridabad, along with the Sohna tehsil of Gurgaon district. Haryana has the second largest Sikh population in India after Punjab, and they mostly live in the districts adjoining Punjab, such as Sirsa, Jind, Fatehabad, Kaithal, Kurukshetra, Ambala and Panchkula.

Religion in Haryana, India (1881–2011)
Religious group	1881		1891		1901		1911		1921		1931		1941		2011	
Religious group	Pop.	%	Pop.	%	Pop.	%	Pop.	%	Pop.	%	Pop.	%	Pop.	%	Pop.	%
Hinduism (Note: 1931-1941 census: including Ad-Dharmis)	2,863,454	71.31%	2,959,925	70.96%	3,012,101	70.57%	2,644,264	68.32%	2,898,119	68.82%	2,980,206	66.29%	3,436,411	66.52%	22,171,128	87.46%
Islam	1,009,526	25.14%	1,037,541	24.87%	1,090,306	25.54%	1,019,439	26.34%	1,074,072	25.5%	1,204,537	26.79%	1,401,689	27.13%	1,781,342	7.03%
Sikhism	118,468	2.95%	146,483	3.51%	135,634	3.18%	175,837	4.54%	193,075	4.58%	271,077	6.03%	292,487	5.66%	1,243,752	4.91%
Jainism	19,885	0.5%	21,575	0.52%	23,906	0.56%	20,950	0.54%	24,005	0.57%	23,666	0.53%	23,050	0.45%	52,613	0.21%
Christianity	4,045	0.1%	5,783	0.14%	6,232	0.15%	10,019	0.26%	22,075	0.52%	16,228	0.36%	11,549	0.22%	50,353	0.2%
Zoroastrianism	6	0.0001%	25	0.001%	27	0.001%	53	0.001%	39	0.001%	8	0.0002%	62	0.001%	—N/a	—N/a
Buddhism	0	0%	0	0%	0	0%	4	0.0001%	5	0.0001%	6	0.0001%	149	0.003%	7,514	0.03%
Judaism	—N/a	—N/a	6	0.0001%	5	0.0001%	8	0.0002%	2	0%	2	0%	7	0.0001%	—N/a	—N/a
Others	2	0%	1	0%	11	0.0003%	0	0%	1	0%	0	0%	765	0.01%	44,760	0.18%
Total population	4,015,386	100%	4,171,339	100%	4,268,222	100%	3,870,574	100%	4,211,393	100%	4,495,730	100%	5,166,169	100%	25,351,462	100%
Note: Colonial-era census figures include small portions of contemporary Punjab, India due to changes to administrative division borders during the post-independence era.: 1. kharar, Ropar tehsil of Ambala District Included in haryana here, while Fully Ropar tehsil given to Punjab in Punjab Reorganisation Act, 1966 while Kharar tehsil 154 village with kalka given to haryana and 282 Village with Kharar kurali town given to Punjab and 36 villages with Chandigarth and Manimajra town to Chandigarth UT.; 2. Jind Princly State fully included in Haryana while its some area also fall into Punjab and Nabha, Patiala State some area also fall in Haryana which not added here.

== Administration ==
=== Divisions ===
Ten Lok Sabha constituencies in Haryana

The state is divided into six revenue divisions, five Police Ranges and four Police Commissionerates (c. January 2017). Six revenue divisions are: Ambala, Rohtak, Gurgaon, Hisar, Karnal and Faridabad. Haryana has 11 municipal corporations (Gurgaon, Faridabad, Ambala, Panchkula, Yamunanagar, Rohtak, Hisar, Panipat, Karnal, Sonipat, and Manesar), 18 municipal councils and 52 municipalities.

Within these, there are 22 districts, 72 sub-divisions, 93 tehsils, 50 sub-tehsils, 140 blocks, 154 cities and towns, 6,848 villages, 6,226 villages panchayats and numerous smaller dhanis.

=== Districts ===
Divisions	Districts
Ambala	Ambala, Kurukshetra, Panchkula, Yamuna Nagar
Faridabad	Faridabad, Palwal, Nuh
Gurgaon	Gurgaon, Mahendragarh, Rewari,
Hisar	Fatehabad, Jind, Hisar, Sirsa,
Rohtak	Jhajjar, Charkhi Dadri, Rohtak, Sonipat, Bhiwani
Karnal	Karnal, Panipat, Kaithal

Haryana consists of six divisions comprising 22 districts. Each district is headed by a Deputy Commissioner (DC), an IAS officer who also functions as the District Magistrate (DM) for maintaining law and order and the District Collector for land revenue administration.

The districts are further divided into sub-divisions and tehsils for land revenue administration, and into blocks for development administration. The subdivisions and tehsils are headed by Sub-Divisional Magistrates (SDMs) and Tehsildars, respectively.

=== Law and order ===
The Haryana Police force is the law enforcement agency of Haryana. Five Police Ranges are Ambala, Hissar, Karnal, Rewari and Rohtak. Four Police Commissionerates are Faridabad, Gurgaon, Panchkula and Sonipat. Cybercrime investigation cell is based in Gurgaon's Sector 51.

The highest judicial authority in the state is the Punjab and Haryana High Court, with the next higher right of appeal being to the Supreme Court of India. Haryana uses an e-filing facility.

=== Healthcare ===
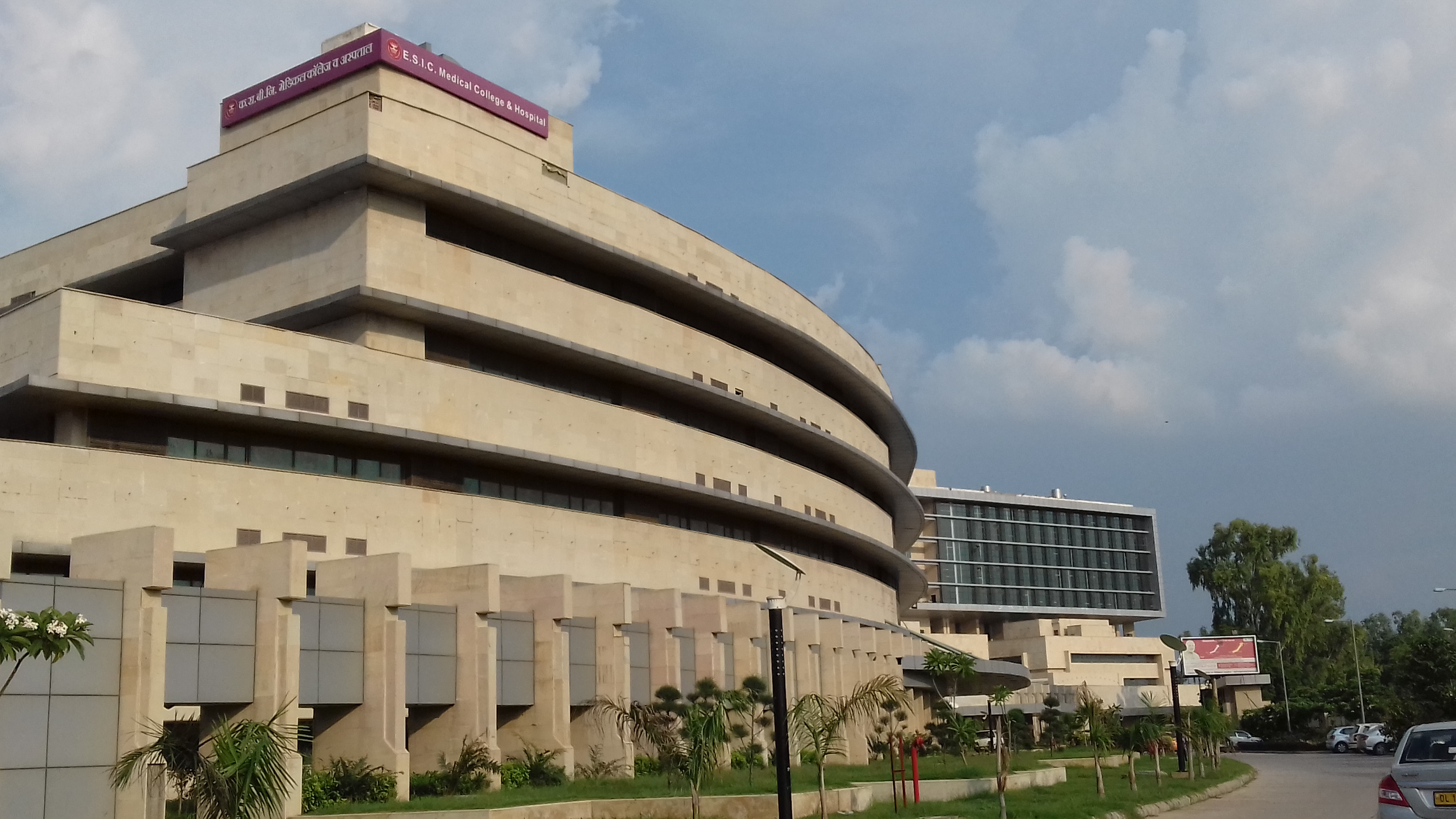
ESIC Medical College, Faridabad

The total fertility rate of Haryana is 2.3. The infant mortality rate is 41 (SRS 2012) and the maternal mortality ratio is 146 (SRS 2010–2012). The state of Haryana has various Medical Colleges including Pandit Bhagwat Dayal Sharma Post Graduate Institute of Medical Sciences Rohtak, Bhagat Phool Singh Medical College in District Sonipat, ESIC Medical College, Faridabad along with notable private medical institutes like Medanta, Max Hospital, and Fortis Healthcare.

=== Governance and e-governance ===
The Common Service Centres (CSCs) have been upgraded in all districts to offer hundreds of e-services to citizens, including applications for new water and sanitation connections, electricity bill collection, ration card member registration, the result of HBSE, admit cards for board examinations, online admission forms for government colleges, long route booking of buses, admission forms for Kurukshetra University and HUDA plots status inquiry. Haryana has become the first state to implement Aadhaar-enabled birth registration in all the districts. Thousands of all traditional offline state and central government services are also available 24/7 online through single unified UMANG app and portal as part of Digital India initiative.

== Economy ==
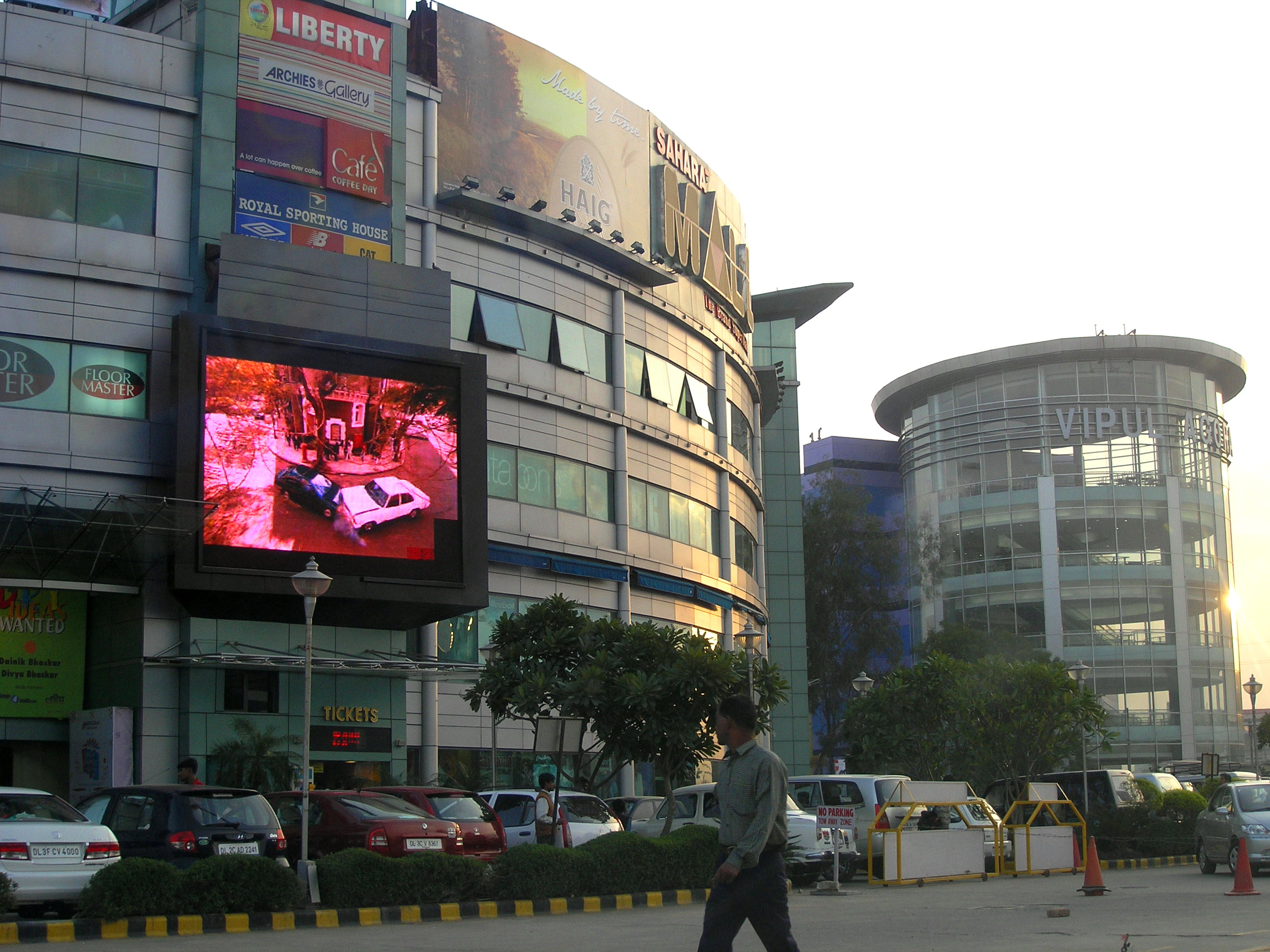
A shopping mall in Gurgaon

Haryana's 14th placed 12.96% 2012–17 CAGR estimated a 2017–18 GSDP of US$95 billion split into 52% services, 30% industries and 18% agriculture.

The services sector is split across 45% in real estate and financial and professional services, 26% trade and hospitality, 15% state and central government employees, and 14% transport and logistics & warehousing.

The industrial sector is split across 69% manufacturing, 28% construction, 2% utilities and 1% mining. In industrial manufacturing, Haryana produces 67% of passenger cars, 60% of motorcycles, 50% of tractors and 50% of the refrigerators in India.

The service and industrial sectors are boosted by 7 operational SEZs and an additional 23 formally approved SEZs (20 already notified and 3 approved in-principle) that are mostly spread along the Delhi–Mumbai Industrial Corridor, Amritsar Delhi Kolkata Industrial Corridor and Western Peripheral Expressway.

The agricultural sector is split across 93% crops and livestock, 4% commercial forestry and logging, and 2% fisheries. Although Haryana has less than 1.4% of the total area of India, it contributes 15% of food grains to the central food security public distribution system, and makes up 7% of total national agricultural exports, including 60% of total national basmati rice exports.

=== Agriculture ===
==== Crops ====
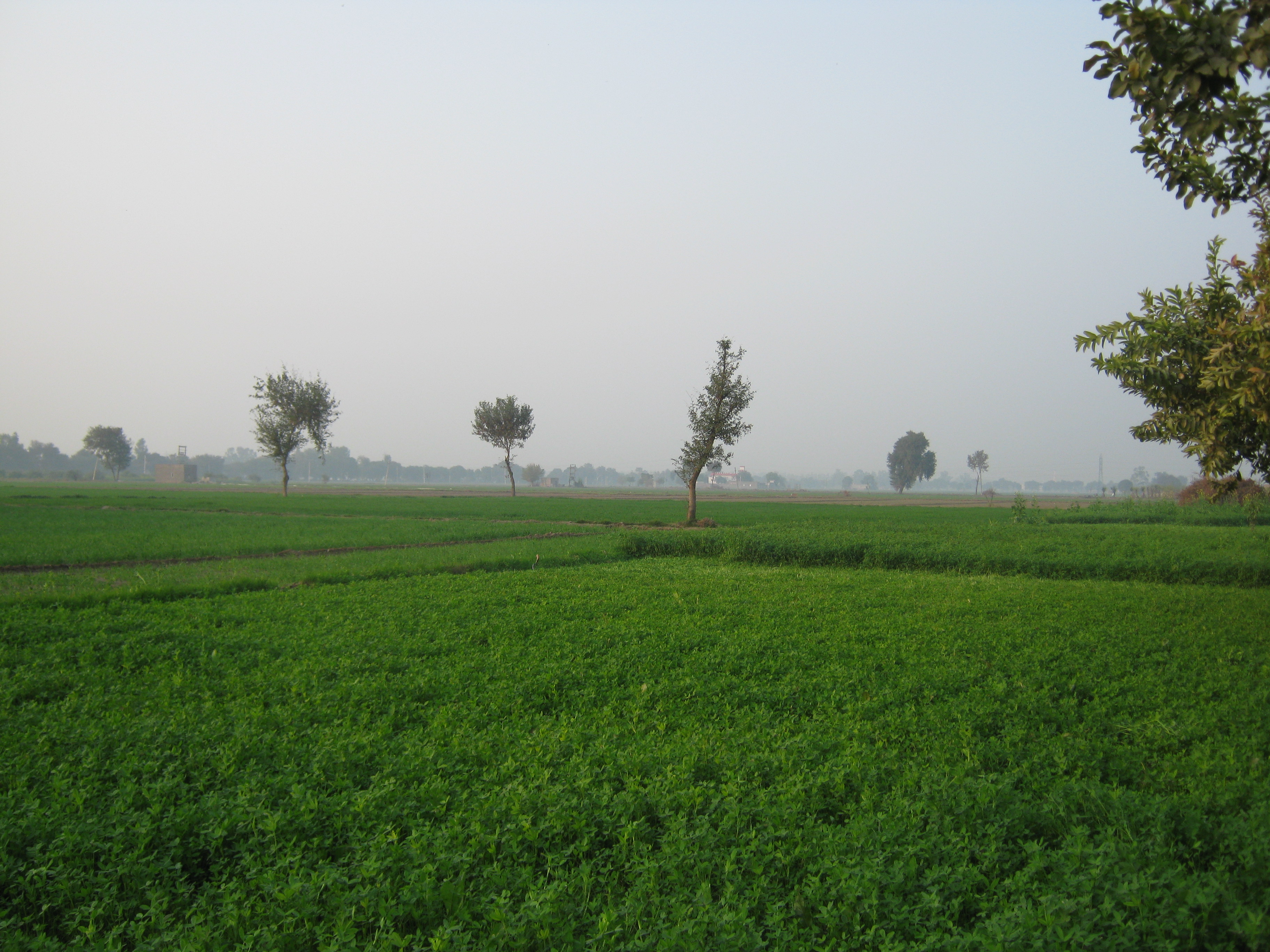
Green farms in Haryana

Haryana is traditionally an agrarian society of zamindars (owner-cultivator farmers). About 70% of Haryana's residents are engaged in agriculture. The Green Revolution in Haryana of the 1960s combined with the completion of Bhakra Dam in 1963 and Western Yamuna Command Network canal system in 1970s resulted in the significantly increased food grain production. This movement lead to large-scale investments towards improving irrigation systems, enhancing the quality of fertilizers, and investing in superior seeds. As a result, Haryana is self sufficient in food production and the second largest contributor to India's central pool of food grains.

In 2015–2016, Haryana produced the following principal crops: 13,352,000 tonnes of wheat, 4,145,000 tonnes of rice, 7,169,000 tonnes of sugarcane, 993,000 tonnes of cotton and 855,000 tonnes of oilseeds (mustard seed, sunflower, etc.). In the northeastern area, dairy cattle, buffaloes, and bullocks play a prominent role, being utilised both for agricultural ploughing and as draft animals.

==== Fruits, vegetables and spices ====
Vegetable production was potato 853,806 tonnes, onion 705,795 tonnes, tomato 675,384 tonnes, cauliflower 578,953 tonnes, leafy vegetables 370,646 tonnes, brinjal 331,169 tonnes, guard 307,793 tonnes, peas 111,081 tonnes and others 269,993 tonnes.

Fruit production was citrus 301,764 tonnes, guava 152,184 tonnes, mango 89,965 tonnes, chikoo 16,022 tonnes, aonla 12,056 tonnes and other fruits 25,848 tonnes.

Spice production was garlic 40,497 tonnes, fenugreek 9,348 tonnes, ginger 4,304 tonnes and others 840 tonnes.

==== Flowers and medicinal plants ====
Cut flowers production was marigold 61,830 tonnes, gladiolus 2,448,620 million, rose 1,861,160 million and other 691,300 million.

Medicinal plants production was: aloe vera 1403 tonnes and stevia 13 tonnes.

==== Livestock ====
Haryana is well known for its high-yield Murrah buffalo. Other breeds of cattle native to Haryana are Haryanvi, Mewati, Sahiwal and Nili-Ravi.

==== Research ====
To support its agrarian economy, both the central government (Central Institute for Research on Buffaloes, Central Sheep Breeding Farm, National Research Centre on Equines, Central Institute of Fisheries, National Dairy Research Institute, Regional Centre for Biotechnology, Indian Institute of Wheat and Barley Research and National Bureau of Animal Genetic Resources) and the state government (CCS HAU, LUVAS, Government Livestock Farm, Regional Fodder Station and Northern Region Farm Machinery Training and Testing Institute) have opened several institutes for research and education.

=== Industrial sector ===
==== Manufacturing ====
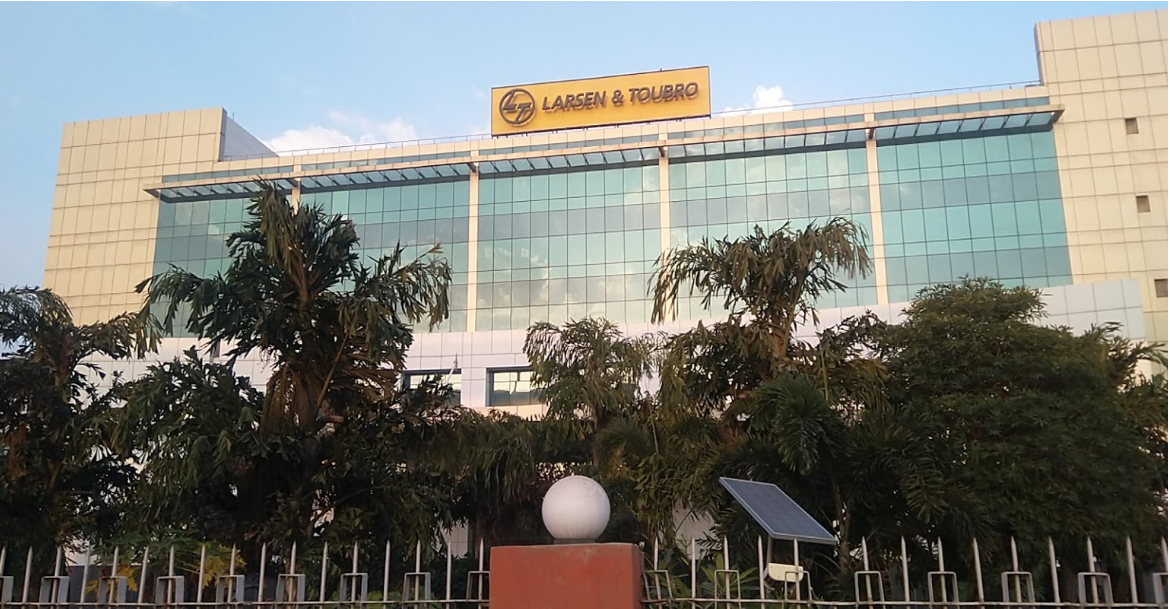
Larsen & Toubro office at Faridabad

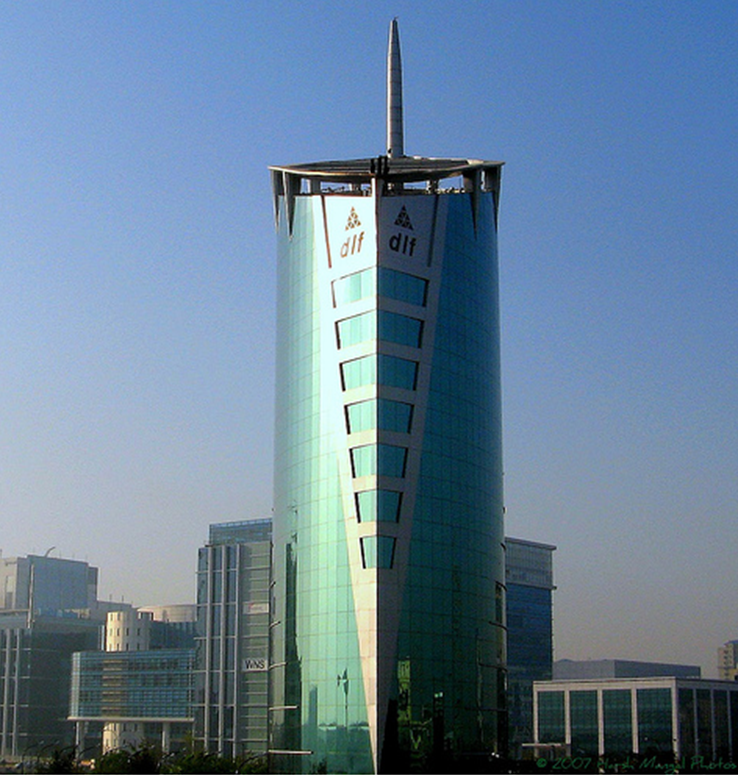
The headquarters of DLF Limited, India's largest real estate company, in Gurgaon, Haryana

- Faridabad is one of the biggest industrial cities of Haryana as well as North India. The city is home to large-scale MNC companies like India Yamaha Motor Pvt. Ltd., Havells India Limited, JCB India Limited, Escorts Group, Indian Oil (R&D), and Larsen & Toubro (L&T). Eyewear e-tailer Lenskart and healthcare startup Lybrate have their headquarters in Faridabad.
- Hissar, an NCR Counter Magnet city known as a steel and cotton spinning hub as well as an upcoming integrated industrial aerocity and aero MRO hub at Hisar Airport, is a fast-developing city and the hometown of Navin Jindal and Subhash Chandra of Zee TV fame. Savitri Jindal, Navin Jindal's mother, has been listed by Forbes as the third richest woman in the world.
- Panipat has heavy industry, including a refinery operated by the Indian Oil Corporation, a urea manufacturing plant operated by National Fertilizers Limited and a National Thermal Power Corporation power plant. It is known for its woven modhas or round stools.
- Sonipat: IMT Kundli, Nathupur, Rai and Barhi are industrial areas with several small and medium-sized enterprises, and also large ones such as Atlas cycles, E.C.E., Birla factory, and OSRAM
- Gurgaon: IMT Manesar, Dundahera and Sohna are industrial and logistics hubs, and also has the National Security Guards, the Indian Institute of Corporate Affairs, the National Brain Research Centre and the National Bomb Data Centre.

==== Utilities ====
Haryana State has always given high priority to the expansion of electricity infrastructure, as it is one of the most important drivers of development for the state. Haryana was the first state in the country to achieve 100% rural electrification in 1970 as well as the first in the country to link all villages with all-weather roads and provide safe drinking water facilities throughout the state.

Sources of power in the state include:

- Renewable and non-polluting sources
  - Hydroelectricity
    - Bhakra-Nangal Dam Hydroelectric Power Plant
    - WYC Hydro Electric Station, 62.4 MW, Yamunanagar
  - Solar power stations
    - Faridabad Solar Power Plant: being set up by HPGCL Faridabad (c.2016).
- Nuclear power stations
  - Gorakhpur Nuclear Power Plant, 2800MW, Fatehabad, Phase-I 1400MW by 2021
- Coal-fired thermal power stations
  - Deenbandhu Chhotu Ram Thermal Power Station, 600MW, Yamunanagar
  - Indira Gandhi Super Thermal Power Project, 1500MW, Jhajjar
  - Jhajjar Power Station, 1500MW
  - Panipat Thermal Power Station I, 440MW
  - Panipat Thermal Power Station II, 920MW
  - Rajiv Gandhi Thermal Power Station, 1200MW, Hisar

== Culture ==
=== Music ===
Haryana has its own unique traditional folk music, folk dances, saang (folk theatre), cinema, belief system such as Jathera (ancestral worship), and arts such as Phulkari and Shisha embroidery.

==== Folk dances ====
Folk music and dances of Haryana are based on satisfying the cultural needs of primarily agrarian and martial natures of Haryanavi tribes.

Haryanvi musical folk theatre's main types are Saang, Raslila and Ragini. The Saang and Ragini form of theatre was popularised by Lakhmi Chand.

Haryanvi folk dances and music have fast energetic movements. Three popular categories of dance are festive-seasonal, devotional, and ceremonial-recreational. The festive-seasonal dances and songs are Gogaji/Gugga, Holi, Phaag, Sawan, Teej. The devotional dances and songs are Chaupaiya, Holi, Manjira, Ras Leela, Raginis). The ceremonial-recreational dances and songs are of following types: legendary bravery (Kissa and Ragini of male warriors and female Satis), love and romance (Been and its variant Nāginī dance, and Ragini), ceremonial (Dhamal Dance, Ghoomar, Jhoomar (male), Khoria, Loor, and Ragini).

==== Folk music and songs ====
A tired wife tells her mother-in-law she’s been waiting since morning for her husband, asking him to leave everything and come see her.

Haryanvi folk music is based on day-to-day themes and injecting earthly humour enlivens the feel of the songs. Haryanvi music takes two main forms: classical folk music and Desi folk music (country music of Haryana), and sung in the form of ballads and love, valor and bravery, harvest, happiness and pangs of the parting of lovers.

===== Classical Haryanvi folk music =====
Classical Haryanvi folk music is based on Indian classical music. Hindustani classical ragas, learnt in gharana parampara of guru–shishya tradition, are used to sing songs of heroic bravery (such as Alha-Khand (1163–1202 CE) about the bravery of Alha and Udal, Jaimal and Patta of Maharana Udai Singh II), Brahmas worship and festive seasonal songs (such as Teej, Holi and Phaag songs of Phalgun month near Holi). Bravery songs are sung in high pitch.

===== Desi Haryanvi folk music =====
Desi Haryanvi folk music, is a form of Haryanvi music, based on Raag Bhairvi, Raag Bhairav, Raag Kafi, Raag Jaijaivanti, Raag Jhinjhoti and Raag Pahadi and used for celebrating community bonhomie to sing seasonal songs, ballads, ceremonial songs (wedding, etc.) and related religious legendary tales such as Puran Bhagat. Relationship and songs celebrating love and life are sung in medium pitch. Ceremonial and religious songs are sung in low pitch. Young girls and women usually sing entertaining and fast seasonal, love, relationship and friendship-related songs such as Phagan (song for eponymous season/month), Katak (songs for the eponymous season/month), Samman (songs for the eponymous season/month), bande-bandi (male-female duet songs), sathne (songs of sharing heartfelt feelings among female friends). Older women usually sing devotional Mangal Geet (auspicious songs) and ceremonial songs such as Bhajan, Bhat (wedding gift to the mother of bride or groom by her brother), Sagai, Ban (Hindu wedding ritual where pre-wedding festivities starts), Kuan-Poojan (a custom that is performed to welcome the birth of a child by worshiping the well or source of drinking water), Sanjhi and Holi festival.

===== Socially normative-cohesive impact =====
Music and dance for Haryanvi people is a way of lessening societal differences as folk singers are highly esteemed and they are sought after and invited for events, ceremonies and special occasions regardless of their caste or status. These inter-caste songs are fluid in nature, and never personalised for any specific caste, and they are sung collectively by women from different strata, castes, and dialects. These songs transform fluidly in dialect, style, words, etc. This adoptive style can be seen in the adoption of tunes of Bollywood movie songs into Haryanvi songs. Despite this continuous fluid transforming nature, Haryanvi songs have a distinct style of their own as explained above.

With the coming up of a strongly socio-economic metropolitan culture in the emergence of urban Gurgaon Haryana is also witnessing community participation in public arts and city beautification. Several landmarks across Gurgaon are decorated with public murals and graffiti with cultural cohesive ideologies and stand the testimony of a lived sentiment in Haryana folk.

=== Cuisine ===
As per a survey, 13% of males and 7.8% of females of Haryana are non-vegetarian. The cuisine of Haryana, rooted in its predominantly agricultural society, has maintained a simple and uncomplicated essence. The regional cuisine features the staples of roti, saag, vegetarian sabzi and milk products such as ghee, milk, lassi and kheer. Haryana is often referred to as the 'Land of Rotis' due to its residents' fondness for various types of rotis. Wheat rotis are ubiquitous, along with the popular baajre ki roti. In the past, rotis were commonly made from a blend of wheat, gram, and barley flour, offering a nutritious and wholesome combination. Another notable variety is the gochini atta, crafted from wheat and gram flour. Haryana is renowned for its abundant livestock, including the famed Murrah buffalo and the Haryana cow. This cattle wealth ensures a plentiful supply of milk and dairy products in Haryanvi cuisine. Many households produce their own butter and ghee, which are generously incorporated into daily meals. Fresh homemade butter, known as "nooni" or "tindi ghee," is commonly churned on a daily basis. When a girl becomes a mother, it's customary for her family to present her with gifts of ghee, edible gum (gondh), laddus (sweetmeats made from gram flour), and dry fruits. Buttermilk, known as "chaaj," is a popular beverage and serves as an instant refresher during the summer months. Lassi, made from yogurt, is another beloved drink that can almost constitute a meal in itself. The Haryanvi fondness for lassi is evident in the fact that "thandai," a sweet milk-based drink, is referred to as "kachi lassi" in Haryana.

=== Punjabi culture ===
Punjabi culture has a significant presence in Haryana, particularly in regions bordering Punjab and the GT road belt. The influence is evident in language, cuisine, festivals, and traditions. Many people in Haryana speak Punjabi alongside Hindi and Haryanvi, and Punjabi music and dance forms like Bhangra and Giddha are popular. Additionally, Punjabi cuisine, including dishes like Makki di Roti and Sarson da Saag, is widely enjoyed. Efforts to preserve and promote Punjabi identity in Haryana have been ongoing, with linguistic and cultural initiatives aimed at strengthening the connection between the Punjabi-speaking population and their heritage.

=== Society ===
Haryanvi people have a concept of inclusive society involving the "36 Jātis" or communities. Castes such as Jat, Rajput, Gurjar, Saini, Pasi, Ahirs, Ror, Meo, Charan, Bishnoi, Harijan, Aggarwal, Brahmin, Khatri and Tyagi are some of the notable of these 36 Jātis.

== Transport ==
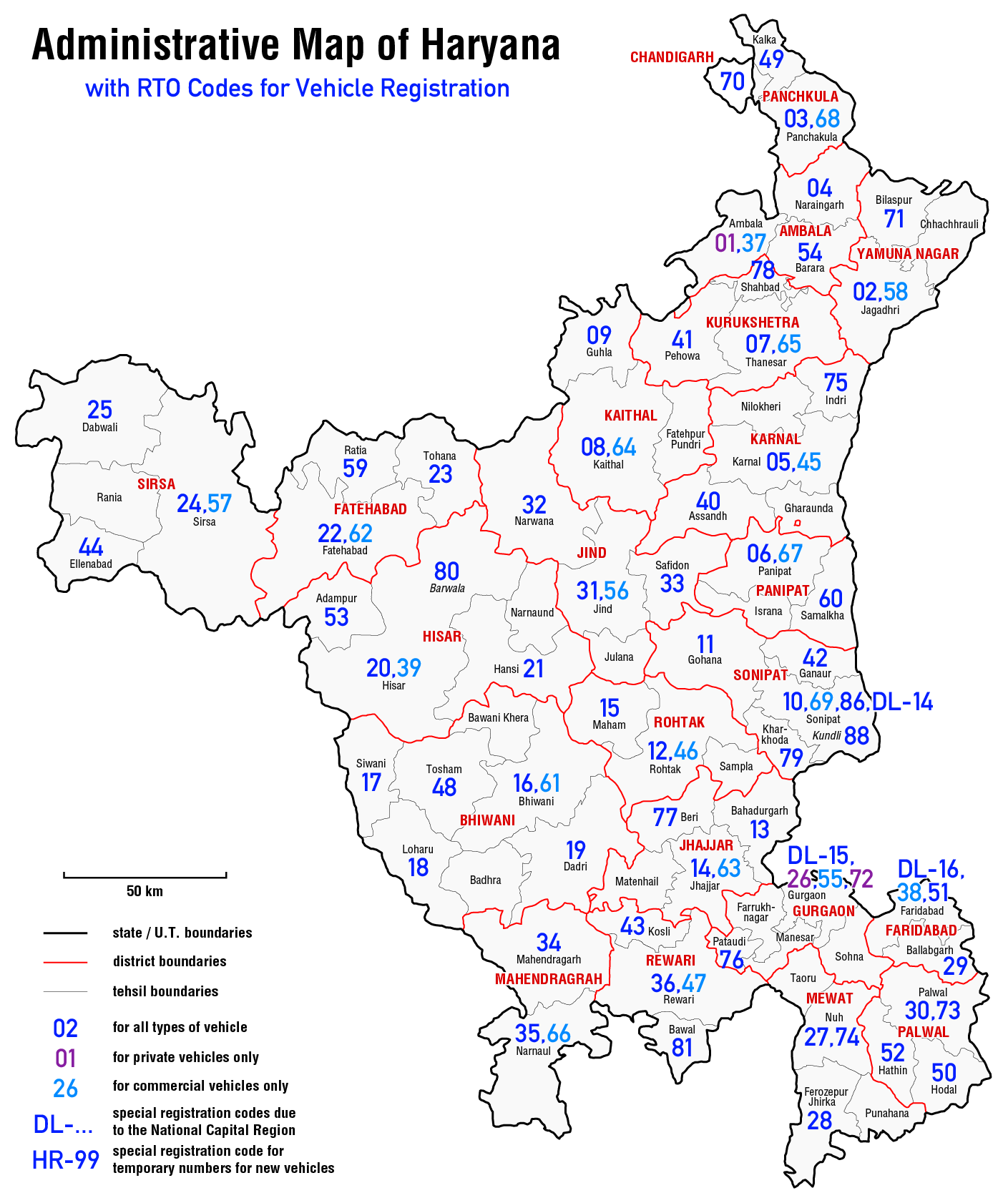
Admin map of Haryana with RTO codes

=== Roads and highways ===
Haryana has a total road length of 26,062 kilometres (16,194 mi), including 2,482 kilometres (1,542 mi) comprising 29 national highways, 1,801 kilometres (1,119 mi) of state highways, 1,395 kilometres (867 mi) of Major District Roads (MDR) and 20,344 kilometres (12,641 mi) of Other District Roads (ODR) (c. December 2017). A fleet of 3,864 Haryana Roadways buses covers a distance of 1.15 million km per day, and it was the first state in the country to introduce luxury video coaches.

Ancient Delhi Multan Road and Grand Trunk Road, South Asia's oldest and longest major roads, pass through Haryana. GT Road passes through the districts of Sonipat, Panipat, Karnal, Kurukshetra and Ambala in north Haryana where it enters Delhi and subsequently the industrial town of Faridabad on its way. The 135.6 kilometres (84.3 mi) Kundli-Manesar-Palwal Expressway (KMP) will provide a high-speed link to northern Haryana with its southern districts such as Sonipat, Gurgaon, and Faridabad.

The Delhi-Agra Expressway (NH-2) that passes through Faridabad is being widened to six lanes from the current four lanes. It will further boost Faridabad's connectivity with Delhi.

=== Railway ===
The rail network in Haryana is covered by five rail divisions under three rail zones. Diamond Quadrilateral High-speed rail network, Eastern Dedicated Freight Corridor (72 km) and Western Dedicated Freight Corridor (177 km) pass through Haryana.

Bikaner railway division of the North Western Railway zone manages the rail network in western and southern Haryana covering Bhatinda-Dabwali-Hanumangarh line, Rewari-Bhiwani-Hisar-Bathinda line, Hisar-Sadulpur line and Rewari-Loharu-Sadulpur line. Jaipur railway division of North Western Railway zone manages the rail network in south-west Haryana covering Rewari-Reengas-Jaipur line, Delhi-Alwar-Jaipur line and Loharu-Sikar line.

The Delhi railway division of the Northern Railway zone manages the rail network in north and east-central Haryana, covering Delhi-Panipat-Ambala line, Delhi-Rohtak-Tohana line, Rewari–Rohtak line, Jind-Sonepat line and Delhi-Rewari line. Agra railway division of North Central Railway zone manages another very small part of the network in southeast Haryana covering only the Palwal-Mathura line.

Ambala railway division of Northern Railway zone manages a small part of the rail network in north-east Haryana covering Ambala-Yamunanagar line, Ambala-Kurukshetra line and UNESCO World Heritage Kalka–Shimla Railway.

==== Metro ====
Delhi Metro connects the national capital Delhi with the NCR cities of Faridabad, Gurgaon and Bahadurgarh. Faridabad has the longest metro network in the NCR Region consisting of 11 stations and a track length of 17 km.

==== Sky Way ====
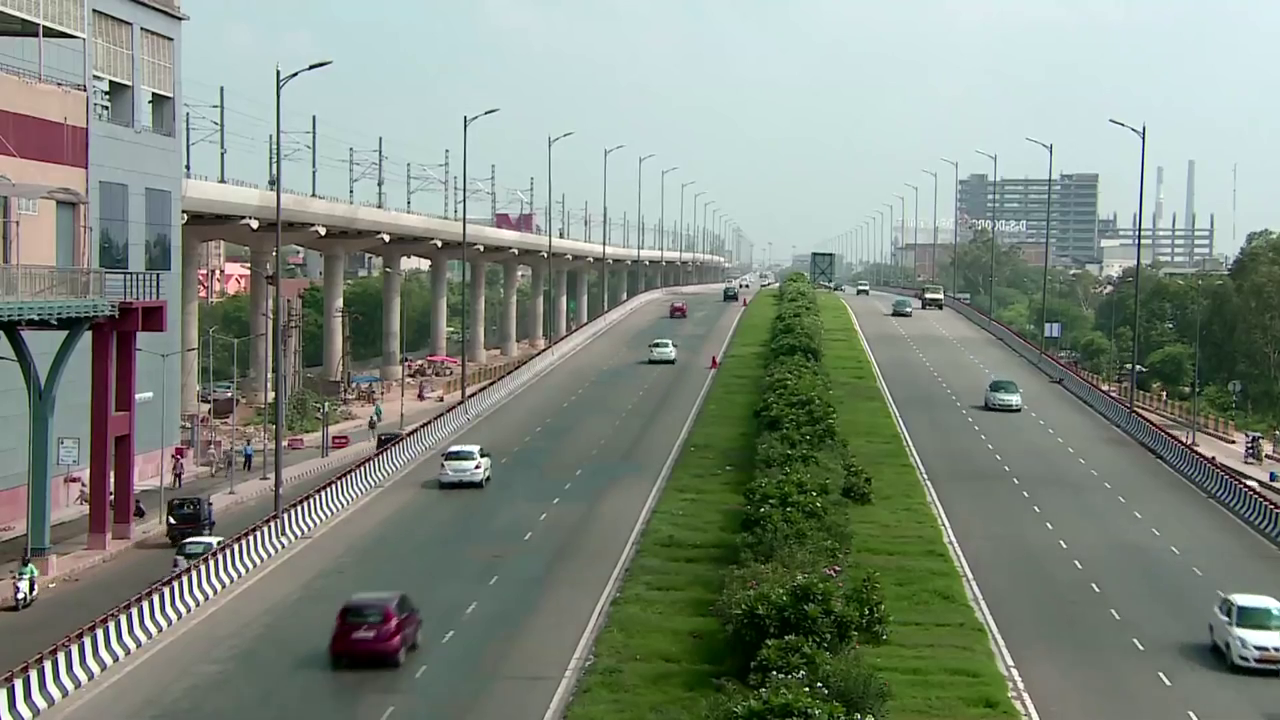
Delhi Faridabad Skyway

The Haryana and Delhi governments have constructed the 4.5-kilometre (2.8 mi) international standard Delhi Faridabad Skyway, the first of its kind in North India, to connect Delhi and Faridabad.

== Education ==
=== Literacy ===
The literacy rate in Haryana has seen an upward trend and is 76.64 per cent as per the 2011 population census. Male literacy stands at 85.38%, while female literacy is at 66.67%. In 2001, the literacy rate in Haryana stood at 67.91%, of which males and females were 78.49% and 55.73% literate respectively. As of 2013, Gurgaon city had the highest literacy rate in Haryana at 86.30% followed by Panchkula at 81.9% and Ambala at 81.7%. In terms of districts, as of 2012, Rewari had the highest literacy rate in Haryana at 74%, higher than the national average of 59.5%; male literacy was 79% and female literacy was 67%. In 2011, Haryana's urban literacy rate stood at 84.98%, marking a notable rise from 79.92% in 2001. Similarly, the rural literacy rate in the state experienced an improvement, reaching 68.91% in 2011 compared to 58.74% in 2001.

=== Schools ===
Haryana Board of School Education, established in September 1969 and shifted to Bhiwani in 1981, conducts public examinations at middle, matriculation, and senior secondary levels twice a year. Over 700,000 candidates attend annual examinations in February and March; 150,000 attend supplementary examinations each November. The Board also conducts examinations for Haryana Open School at senior and senior secondary levels twice a year. The Haryana government provides free education to women up to the bachelor's degree level.

In 2015–2016, there were nearly 20,000 schools, including 10,100 state government schools (36 Aarohi Schools, 11 Kasturba Gandhi Balika Vidyalayas, 21 Model Sanskriti Schools, 8,744 government primary school, 3386 government middle school, 1,284 government high school and 1,967 government senior secondary schools), 7,635 private schools (200 aided, 6,612 recognised unaided, and 821 unrecognised unaided private schools) and several hundred other central government and private schools such as Kendriya Vidyalaya, Indian Army Public Schools, Jawahar Navodaya Vidyalaya and DAV schools affiliated to central government's CBSE and ICSE school boards.

=== Universities and higher education ===
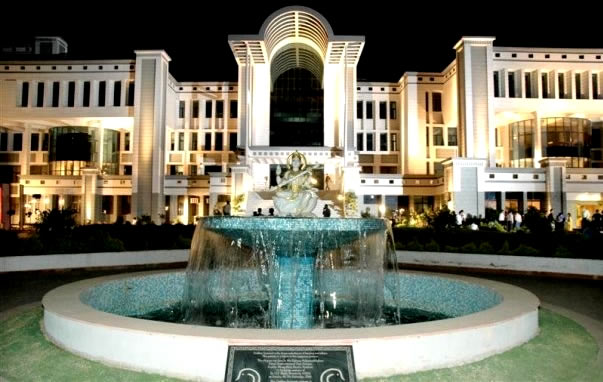
MRIU

Haryana has 48 universities and 1,038 colleges, including 115 government colleges, 88 government-aided colleges and 96 self-finance colleges. Hisar has three universities: Chaudhary Charan Singh Haryana Agricultural University – Asia's largest agricultural university, Guru Jambheshwar University of Science and Technology, Lala Lajpat Rai University of Veterinary & Animal Sciences); several national agricultural and veterinary research centres (National Research Centre on Equines), Central Sheep Breeding Farm, National Institute on Pig Breeding and Research, Northern Region Farm Machinery Training and Testing Institute and Central Institute for Research on Buffaloes (CIRB); and more than 20 colleges including Maharaja Agrasen Medical College, Agroha.

Demographically, Haryana has 471,000 women and 457,000 men pursuing post-secondary school higher education. There are more than 18,616 female teachers and 17,061 male teachers in higher education.

Union Minister Ravi Shankar Prasad announced on 27 February 2016 that the National Institute of Electronics and Information Technology (NIELIT) would be set up in Kurukshetra to provide computer training to youth and a Software Technology Park of India (STPI) would be set up in Panchkula's existing HSIIDC IT Park in Sector 23. Hindi and English are compulsory languages in schools whereas Punjabi, Sanskrit and Urdu are chosen as optional languages.

== Communication and media ==
Haryana has a statewide network of telecommunication facilities. Haryana Government has its own statewide area network by which all government offices of 22 districts and 126 blocks across the state are connected with each other, thus making it the first SWAN of the country. Bharat Sanchar Nigam Limited and most of the leading private sector players (such as Reliance Infocom, Tata Teleservices, Bharti Telecom, Idea Vodafone Essar, Aircel, Uninor and Videocon) have operations in the state. The two biggest cities of Haryana, Faridabad and Gurgaon, which are part of the National Capital Region, come under the local Delhi Mobile Telecommunication System. The rest of the cities of Haryana come under Haryana Telecommunication System.

Electronic media channels include MTV, 9XM, Star Group, SET Max, News Time, NDTV 24x7 and Zee Group. The radio stations include All India Radio and other FM stations.

Panipat, Hisar, Ambala and Rohtak are the cities in which the leading newspapers of Haryana are printed and circulated throughout Haryana, in which Dainik Bhaskar, Dainik Jagran, Punjab Kesari, The Tribune, Aaj Samaj, Hari Bhoomi and Amar Ujala are prominent.

== Sports ==
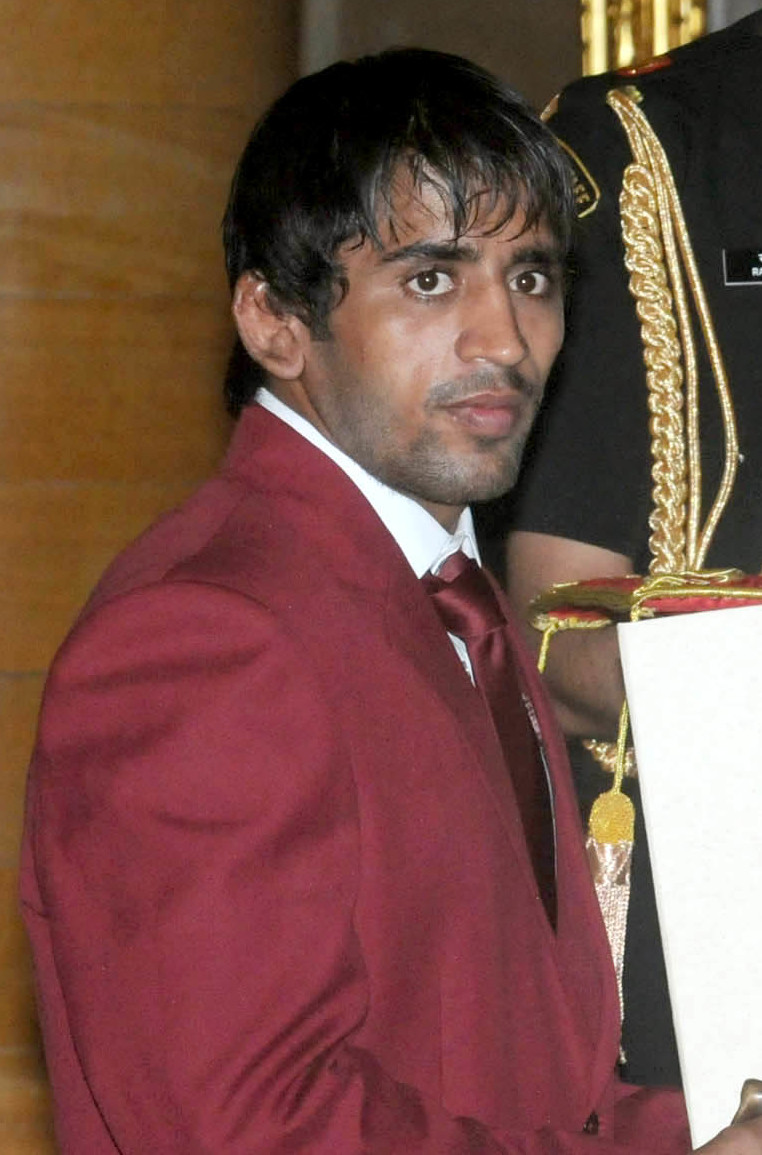
Wrestler Bajrang Punia

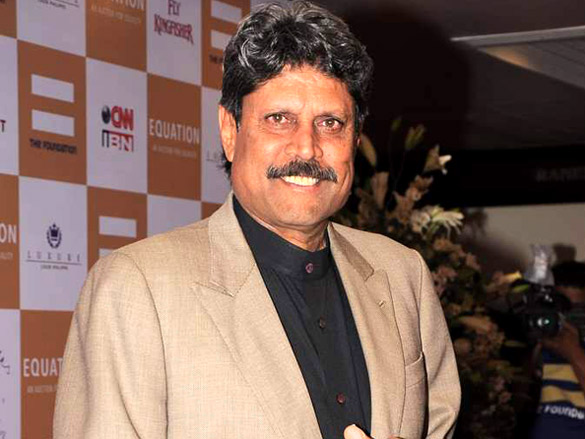
Cricketer Kapil Dev

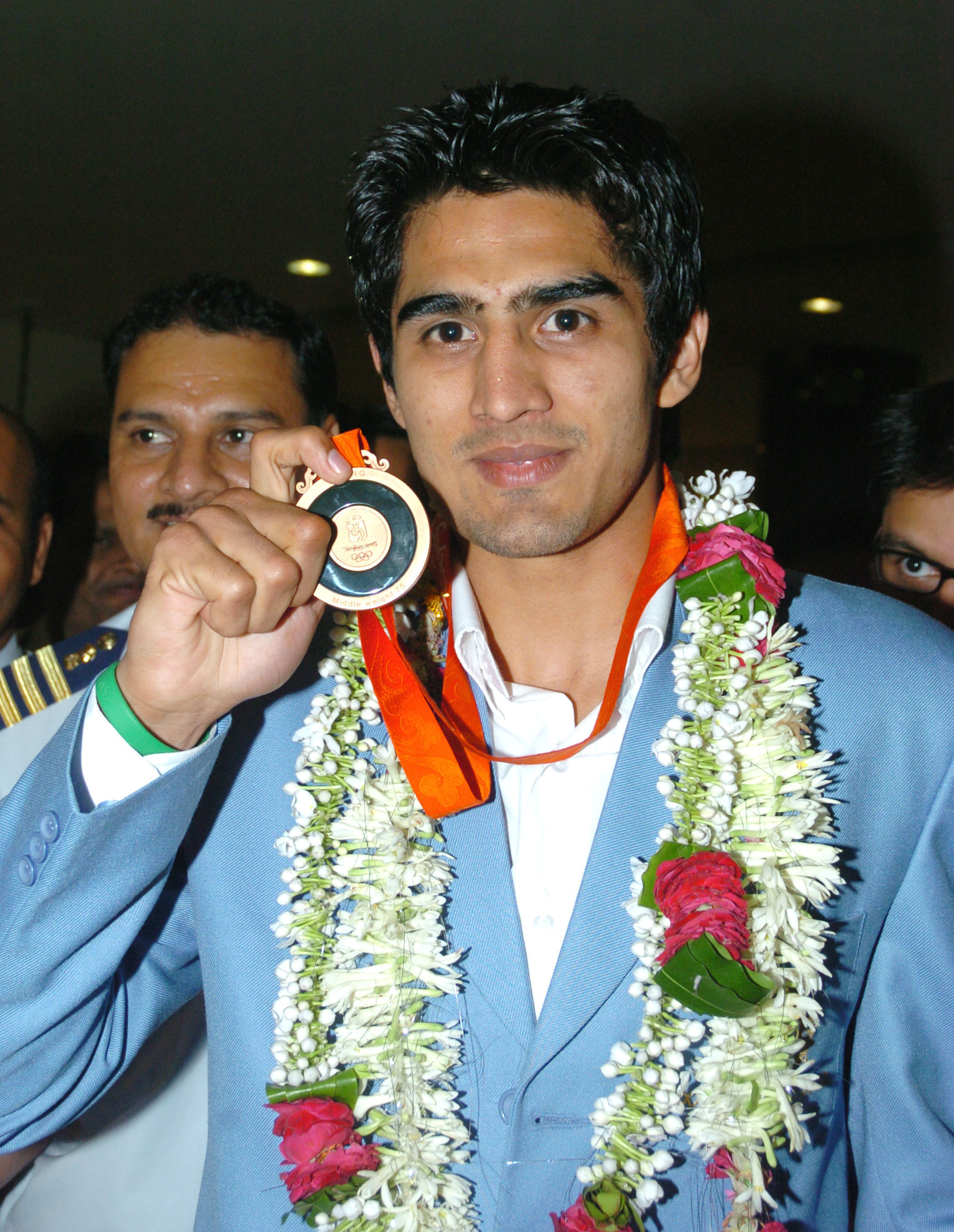
Boxer Vijender Singh

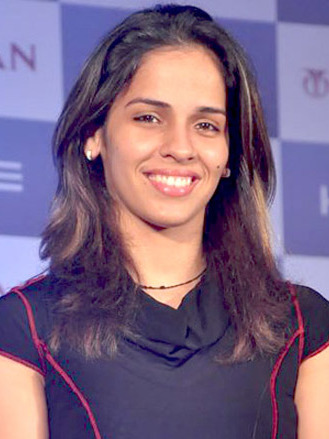
Badminton player Saina Nehwal

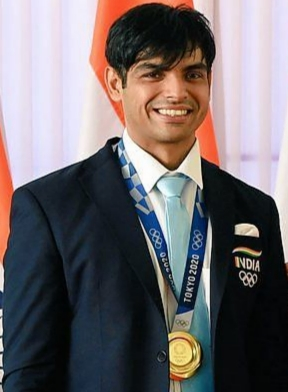
Athlete Neeraj Chopra

In the 2010 Commonwealth Games at Delhi, 22 out of 38 gold medals that India won came from Haryana. During the 33rd National Games held in Assam in 2007, Haryana stood first in the nation with a medal tally of 80, including 30 gold, 22 silver and 28 bronze medals.

The 1983 World Cup winning captain Kapil Dev made his domestic-cricket debut playing for Haryana. Nahar Singh Stadium was built in Faridabad in the year 1981 for international cricket. This ground has the capacity to hold around 25,000 people as spectators. Tejli Sports Complex is an ultra-modern sports complex in Yamuna Nagar. Tau Devi Lal Stadium in Gurgaon is a multi-sport complex.

Former Chief Minister of Haryana, Manohar Lal Khattar announced the "Haryana Sports and Physical Fitness Policy", a policy to support 26 Olympic sports, on 12 January 2015 with the words "We will develop Haryana as the sports hub of the country."

Haryana is home to Haryana Gold, one of India's eight professional basketball teams that compete in the country's UBA Pro Basketball League.

At the 2016 Summer Olympics, Sakshi Malik won the bronze medal in the 58 kg category, becoming the first Indian female wrestler to win a medal at the Olympics and the fourth female Olympic medalist from the country.

Notable badminton player Saina Nehwal is from Hisar in Haryana.

Notable athlete Neeraj Chopra, who competes in Javelin Throw and won the first track and field gold medal in 2020 Tokyo Olympics for India, was born and raised in Panipat, Haryana. Wrestling is also very prominent in Haryana, as 2 medals won in wrestling at 2020 Tokyo Olympics were from Haryana.

Notable athlete Ravi Dahiya, who was born in Nahri village of Sonipat District, won a silver medal in the 2020 Tokyo Olympics for India.

Ravi Kumar is an Indian freestyle wrestler who won a silver medal at the 2020 Tokyo Olympics in the 57 kg category. Dahiya is also a bronze medalist from 2019 World Wrestling Championships and a two-time Asian champion.

Shooter Manu Bhaker who won two bronze medals at 2024 Paris Olympics

== See also ==
- List of Monuments of National Importance in Haryana
- List of State Protected Monuments in Haryana
- Outline of Haryana
- Politics of Haryana
- Tourism in Haryana
- Haryanvi cinema
- List of earthquakes in Haryana

== Sources ==
- Haryana Sports and Physical Fitness Policy (PDF), Government of Haryana, 12 January 2015, archived from the original (PDF) on 17 November 2015
- Atul Kumar Sinha; Abhay Kumar Singh, eds. (2007), Udayana New Horizons in History, Classics and Inter-Cultural studies, Anamika Publishers, ISBN 978-81-7975-168-8
- National Disaster Risk Reduction Portal - Haryana (PDF), National Institute of Disaster Management, archived from the original (PDF) on 9 September 2016
- Sharma, Suresh K (2006). Haryana: Past and Present. New Delhi: Mittal Publications. p. 763. ISBN 81-8324-046-1. Archived from the original on 28 March 2024.
- Khanna, C. L. (2008). Haryana General Knowledge. Agra: Upkar Prakashan. p. 75. ISBN 978-81-7482-383-0.
- Yadav, Ram B. (2008). Folk Tales & Legends of Haryana. Gurgaon: Pinnacle Technology. p. 305. ISBN 978-81-7871-162-1.
- Mittal, Satish Chandra (1986). Haryana, a Historical Perspective. New Delhi: Atlantic Publishers & Distributors. p. 183.
- Singh, Mandeep; Kaur, Harvinder (2004). Economic Development of Haryana. New Delhi: Deep and Deep Publications. p. 234. ISBN 81-7629-558-2.
- Gandhi, Mahatma (1977). Gandhiji and Haryana: A collection of his speeches and writings pertaining to Haryana. Usha Publications. p. 158.
- Phadke, H. A. (1990). Haryana, ancient and medieval. Harman Publishing House. p. 256. ISBN 81-85151-34-2.
- Singh, Chattar (2004). Social and economic change in Haryana. National Book Organisation. p. 252. ISBN 81-87521-10-4.
- Yadav, Kripal Chandra (2002). Modern Haryana: History and culture, 1803–1966. Manohar Publishers & Distributors. p. 320. ISBN 81-7304-371-X.
- Rai, Gulshan (1987). Formation of Haryana. B.R. Publishing Corporation. p. 223. ISBN 81-7018-412-6.
- Handa, Devendra (2004). Buddhist remains from Haryana. Sundeep Prakashan. p. 97. ISBN 81-7574-153-8.
- Haryana at a glance: Statistical overview & development indicators. Jagran Research Centre. 2007. p. 157. ISBN 9788186821428.
- Singh, Chander Pal (2003). Early medieval art of Haryana. Koshal Book Depot. p. 168. ISBN 81-86049-07-X.
- Handa, Devendra (2006). Sculptures from Haryana: Iconography and style. Indian Institute of Advanced Study. p. 286. ISBN 81-7305-307-3.
- Journal of Haryana Studies. Kurukshetra: Kurukshetra University. 2008.
- Harvey, Bill; Harvey, William; Devasar, Nikhil; Grewal, Bikram; Oriental Bird Club (2006). Atlas of the birds of Delhi and Haryana. Rupa & Co. p. 352. ISBN 81-291-0954-9.
- Sarkar, Jadunath (1960). Military History of India. Orient Longmans. pp. 66–69. ISBN 9780861251551.
