= Karna Lake =

Lake in Haryana, India

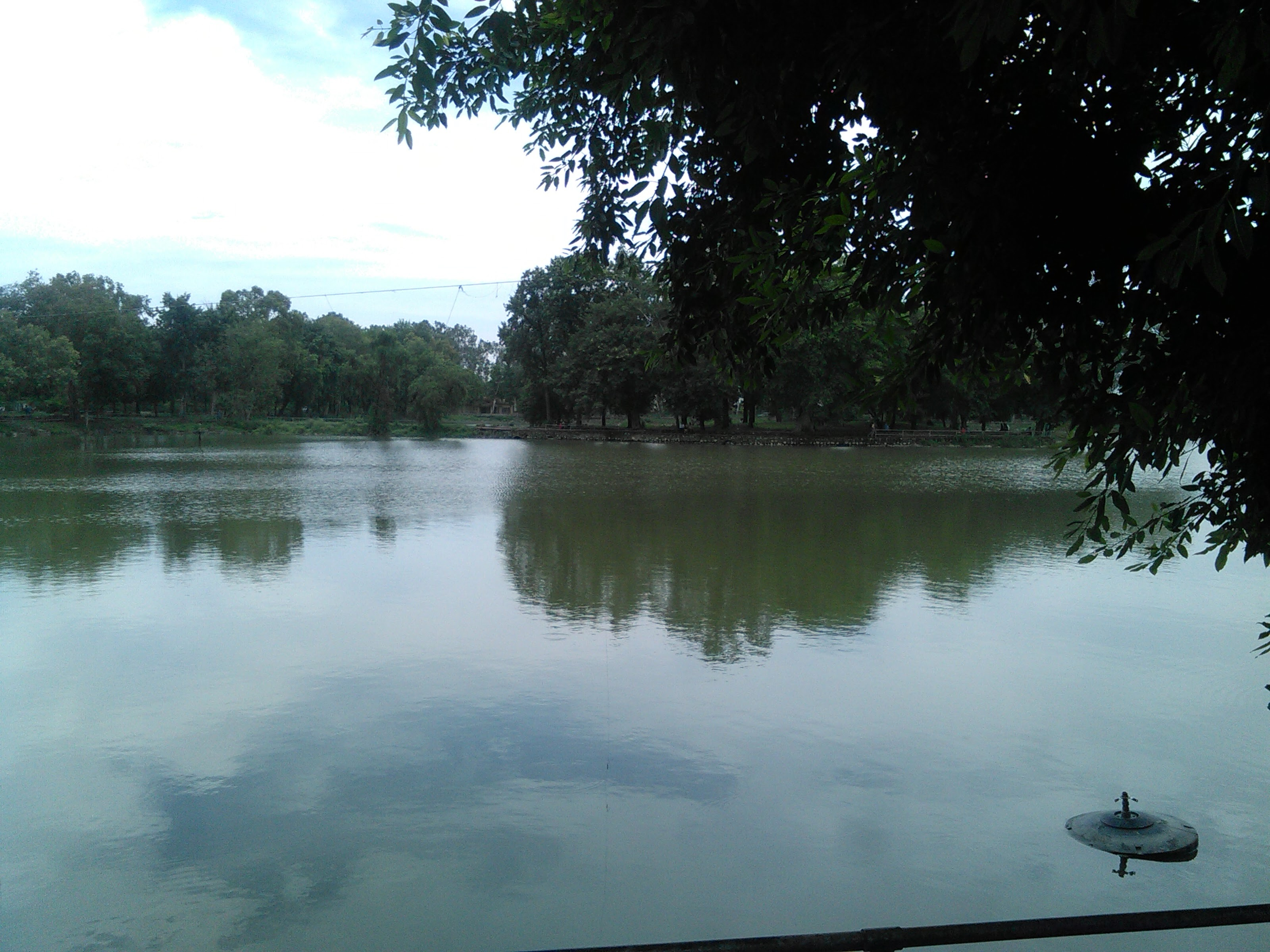

- Location within Haryana
- Location: Karnal, Haryana
- Coordinates: 29°44.632′N 76°58.574′E
- Basin countries: India

Karna Lake is a major tourist attraction in the Karnal district of Haryana. It is located at a distance of 125 km from both Chandigarh and Delhi, thus serving as a midway halt while traveling between the two cities on the famous Grand Trunk Road. Folklore has it that Karna, a famous character from Indian history, who played a major role in the war of Mahabharat, used to bathe in this lake. It was at this spot that he gave away his protective armor to Indra, the Godfather of Arjuna, Karna's arch-enemy. It is surmised that the city of Karnal derives its name from Karna-Taal, which translates to Karna Lake. That may also be the reason for Karnal to be called the City of Karna in local parlance.

Karna Lake is maintained by Haryana Tourism Corporation.
