= Hathni Kund =

Coordinates: 30.314°N 77.583°E

Hathni Kund Western Yamuna Canal
- Town
- Interactive map of Hathni Kund
- Country: India
- State: Haryana

Languages
  - Official: Hindi
- Time zone: UTC+5:30 (IST)
- Vehicle registration: HR
- Website: haryana.gov.in

Hathni Kund is a location of origin of Western Yamuna Canal in the Indian state of Haryana, built on a raised plinth overlooking the Yamuna River. The river flows into the plains of Haryana after crossing over the last lap of the Himalayan foothills at Paonta Sahib. The waters of the western Yamuna Canal were collected in the Tajewala Barrage, 5 kilometres (3.1 mi) from Hathni Kund, but this function is now provided by the newer Hathni Kund Barrage.

The spot is a popular visitor location and there is a restaurant and facilities for rafting, camping and body surfing along with wildlife tracts for adventure sport.

== Location ==
Hathni Kund is near the town of Yamuna Nagar along with its railway station and close to the Sal Forest reserve of Kalesar National Park.

The rapids near Hathni Kund are of medium intensity and popular with rafters.

== Flora and fauna ==
The Rufous treepie, drongo, hornbill, blue peafowl and partridge are present locally. Neelgai (blue bull), kakad or barking deer, monkey, jackal and an occasional chital can also be spotted here. Kalesar covers about 5,100 hectares (13,000 acres) and is the only Sal forest tract in Haryana. There are many flowering trees in the Kalesar forest, including Dhak, Kachnar and Amaltas. The barrage at Tajewala is a popular angling spot.

== See also ==
- Gurugram Bhim Kund (Hindi: गुरुग्राम भीम कुंड), also known as Pinchokhda Jhod (Hindi: पिंचोखड़ा जोहड़),
- Indira Gandhi Canal
- Irrigation in India
- Indian Rivers Inter-link
- Water transport in India
- Ganges Canal
- Ganges Canal (Rajasthan)
- Upper Ganges Canal Expressway
