= Rakhigarhi Indus Valley Civilisation Museum =

Rakhigarhi Indus Valley civilisation museum
- Location within Haryana Location within India
- Location: Rakhigarhi, Hisar, Haryana, India
- Coordinates: 29.1719°N 76.0647°E
- Type: Museum
- Public transit access: Rakhigarhi bus stand, Hisar Airport, Hisar Junction railway station

The Rakhigarhi Indus Valley civilisation museum, with a research center and hostel for researchers, is a proposed museum to be built in Rakhigarhi village in Hisar district of Haryana state in India.

As of February 2021, the museum was still under construction, with political rows over the proposed design. It was not expected to be opened until 2022 at the earliest.

== History ==
=== Ancient context ===
A 2017 joint roundtable conference by Rasika Research & Design, INTACH, Center for Art and Archaeology, Sushant School of Art and Architecture at Ansal University and Deccan College affirmed the whole 550 hectares (1,400 acres; 5.5 km^{2}; 2.1 sq mi) Rakhi Garhi IVC archaeological site a living museum. Highlighting the significance of Rakhigarhi, speaker Surbhi Gupta (Director, Rasika Research & Design) announced at the conference, "What Giza is to Egypt, and Athens is to Greece, Haryana should be to India."

Rakhi Garhi site with 550 hectares (1,400 acres; 5.5 km^{2}; 2.1 sq mi) area is the largest IVC site in the world, which is about double the size than that of next largest site Mohenjo Daro, asserts Professor Dr. Vasant Shinde, Vice Chancellor of Daccan College and in-charge of Rakhi Garhi excavation. He further informed about the 6,000 years old pre-Harappan IVC site and 5,000 years old human skeletons found during the excavation, "the scientific data collected on the basis excavations here have strongly pointed that Rakhigarhi, a metropolis, was perhaps the capital of its times about 5,000 years ago. The scientists have, for the first time ever, succeeded in extracting DNA from the skeletons of the Indus Valley Civilisation. We have collected evidences of massive manufacturing and trade activities in this town, which revealed the economic organisation and the foreign links of people here. They had trade links with people in Rajasthan, Gujarat, Baluchistan and even Afghanistan. The city flourished during the early Harappan era dating back to around 3,300 BC and existed till 2000 BC." NASA and Indian Space Research Organisation (ISRO) undertook the joint study of artifacts found at Rakhi Garhi during 2011-16 excavations, estimated to be 6,000 years old, older than 3,500 years old Harappan civilization. NASA and ISRO will also carry out a joint in-stu site inspection to verify the claims of 6,000 years old Pre-harappan phase of Rakhi Gahri IVC being the oldest and largest civilization in the world, though the joint two month long excavations by Haryana State Archaeology Department, Indian Archaeological Society and National Museum in May 2017 at much smaller nearby 7,570-6,200 BCE IVC site of Kunal were initially estimated to be 1,000 years older than Rakhi Garhi.

=== Past excavations ===
In 1969, site was first studied and documented by Dr. Suraj Bhan, Dean of Indic studies at Kurukshetra University. In 1997-98, 1998-99 and 1999-2000, site was excavated for the first time by Dr. Amrender Nath, former director of the Archaeological Survey of India (ASI), who later published his findings in scholarly journals and was convicted by Central Bureau of Investigation special court in 2015 to two and half years rigorous prison sentence for fraud for falsifying the bill payments for 1990s Rakhigarhi excavations. From 2011-16, team led by Dr. Vasant Shinde of Deccan College carried out several excavations and published their findings in scholarly journals.

=== Establishment of museum ===
The open-air museum site also has an extant village with 10,000 inhabitants, where the construction of a 6 acres (2.4 ha) indoor museum, interpretation center, research center and a hostel for the researchers is also underway (as of September 26, 2026). In 2013-14 financial year, the Rakhigarhi village panchayat had donated 6 acres (2.4 ha) land to Haryana State Archaeology Department and Government of Haryana had allocated ₹25 million (equivalent to ₹42 million, US$440,000 or €390,000 in 2023) for the general development of the site by Archaeological Survey of India to prepare it for the construction of the Rakhigarhi Indus Valley Civilisation Museum-cum-Interpretation Centre, work was temporarily put on hold after CBI inquiry into mismanagement of the fund. In 2015-16 financial budget, Government of Haryana allocated initial amount of ₹50 million (equivalent to ₹75 million, US$780,000 or €690,000 in 2023) for the construction of Museum-cum-Interpretation Centre. The Chief Minister of Haryana, Manohar Lal Khattar unveiled the plaque for the construction of museum on 2 March 2016. In 2016-2017 financial year, construction gained pace after the Government of Haryana had finalized the site plan, taken possession of the land and released a further grant of ₹230 million (equivalent to ₹330 million, US$3.4 million or €3.0 million in 2023) in May 2016, and public tender had been invited by January 2017 for the construction.

The site has four blocks of buildings, a Museum (38,868 sq ft), Hostel for researchers (8,371.7 sq ft), Rest house for visitors (9,870 sq ft) and Cafeteria (2,500 sq ft). The project saw some delay when the design of the museum was changed and a court case affecting the Museum block, though the design and the progress of construction of three remaining blocks remains unaffected. Govt has given INR 24 million funds, of which INR 14 million tender is for the museum site to be completed within 21 months (Dec 2018) from the contract award date (status as of 27 Nov 2017).

== See also ==
- List of Museums in Haryana
- Asigarh Fort at Hansi
- Pranpir Badshah tomb, Panchyat Bhawan in Hisar Govt College ground
- Haryana Rural Antique Museum at HAU Hisar
- Jahaj Kothi Museum at Hisar fort
- Sheikhpura Kothi near Hansi
- Dharohar Museum at Kurukshetra University
- Kurukshetra Panorama and Science Centre at Kurukshetra
- Shrikrishna Museum at Kurukshetra
- Rewari Railway Heritage Museum at Rewari railway station
