= Jahaj Kothi Zonal Museum =

Museum in Haryana, India

Jahaj Kothi Museum
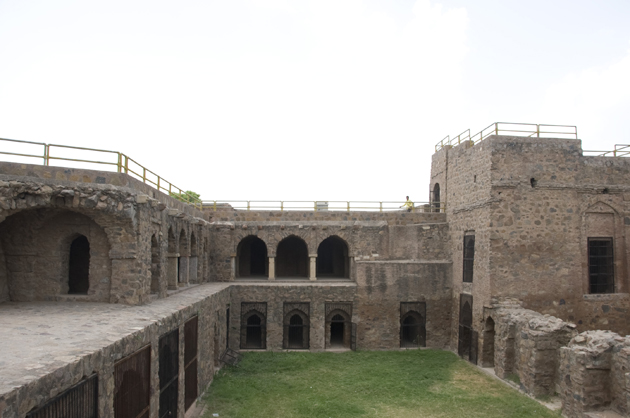

- Location within Haryana Location within India
- Location: Firoz Shah Palace Complex, Hisar, Haryana, India
- Coordinates: 29.166306°N 75.720587°E
- Type: Museum
- Public transit access: Hisar bus stand, Hisar Airport, Hisar Junction railway station
- Website: haryanatourism.gov.in/showpage.aspx?contentid=5262

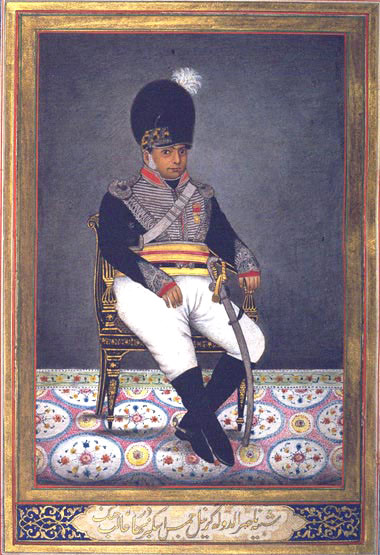
James Skinner CB (1778–1841), 19th century. Probably from Thomas Metcalfe's book dated 1843.

The Jahaj Kothi Museum in Hisar, Haryana, India, originally an 18th-century Jain temple which was also the residence of George Thomas (c. 1756 – 22 August 1802) and James Skinner (c. 1778 – 1841), is located inside the Firoz Shah Palace Complex which lies in front of Hisar Bus Stand.

== History ==
Jahaj Kothi Museum is a later era building located inside Firoz Shah Palace Complex and maintained by Archaeological Survey of India. It is called the jahaj, Hindi for the ship as its shape resembles a ship. It was originally a Jain temple which was later used as residence by the Irish mercenary adventurer George Thomas (c. 1756 – 22 August 1802).

George's father was a poor Catholic tenant farmer near Roscrea who died when George was a child. Originally press-ganged at Youghal, where he worked as a labourer on the docks, Thomas deserted from the British Navy in Madras in 1781. Still illiterate, he led a group of Pindaris north to Delhi by 1787, where he took service under Begum Samru of Sardhana. Supplanted in her favour by a Frenchman, he transferred his allegiance to Appa Rao, a Mahratta chieftain. He carved out an independent kingdom in the districts of Rohtak and Hissar and made Hansi as his capital. During his short period of rule, he established a mint in Hansi and released rupees of his own kingdom. His area of control included area from Ghaggar to Beri in south and from Meham to Baharda in west. He rebuilt Hansi, which was in ruined state and built defensive walls and fortifications.

In 1796 AD, George rebuilt Jahaj Kothi at Hisar, Haryana which was his residence. He ruled the area independently up to 1801, when he was driven out by Sikh-Maratha-French confederacy. He was finally defeated and captured by Scindia's army under General Pierre Cuillier-Perron. He died on his way down the Ganges on 22 August 1802.

After George's defeat, this was taken over by James Skinner (c. 1778 – 1841) who also used this as his residence. It lies near the locality called jahaj pul or "jahaj bridge" which still exists in the form of a ramp road to its east between this building and auto market. Archaeological Survey of India use this as its site office and maintains a small museum inside.

Colonel James Skinner CB (1778 – 4 December 1841) was an Anglo-Indian military adventurer in India, who became known as Sikandar Sahib later in life, and is most known for two cavalry regiments he raised for the British, later known as 1st Skinner's Horse and 3rd Skinner's Horse (formerly 2nd Skinner's Horse) at Hansi in 1803, which still are a part of the Indian Army

In 2009, it was notified as a protected monument and subsequently upgraded into a regional archaeological museum.

== Building material ==
Built in 18th century, the building is constructed of burnt mud and clay bricks and mortar made of lime, sand, and surkhi. Surkhi is made by grinding to powder burnt bricks, brick-bats or burnt clay, used as a substitute for sand for concrete and mortar, has almost the same function as of sand but it also imparts some strength and hydraulicity.

== Departments and collections ==
This zonal museum, maintained by the Haryana State Directorate of Archaeology & Museums, houses 193 artefacts, which includes he following:

- Indus-Saravati Valley Civilisation artifacts excavated from western Haryana.
  - Rakhigarhi (4600 BCE to 1900 BCE):
  - Kunal (5000 BCE - 2800 BCE): symbolic motifs such as peacocks.
  - Banawali (2500 BCE - 1450 BCE): terracotta figures, painted pottery, and Horned Deity pot.
- Gurjara-Pratihara dynasty (8th to 11th centuries CE): sculptures of deities such as Vishnu, Shiva, Surya and Mahishasura Mardini as well as the architectural fragments from ancient temples destroyed by Islamic invasion of India.
- Jain artifacts
- George Thomas's inscription stone in English and Persian who had renovated this Jain temple to use as his residence.

== Gallery ==
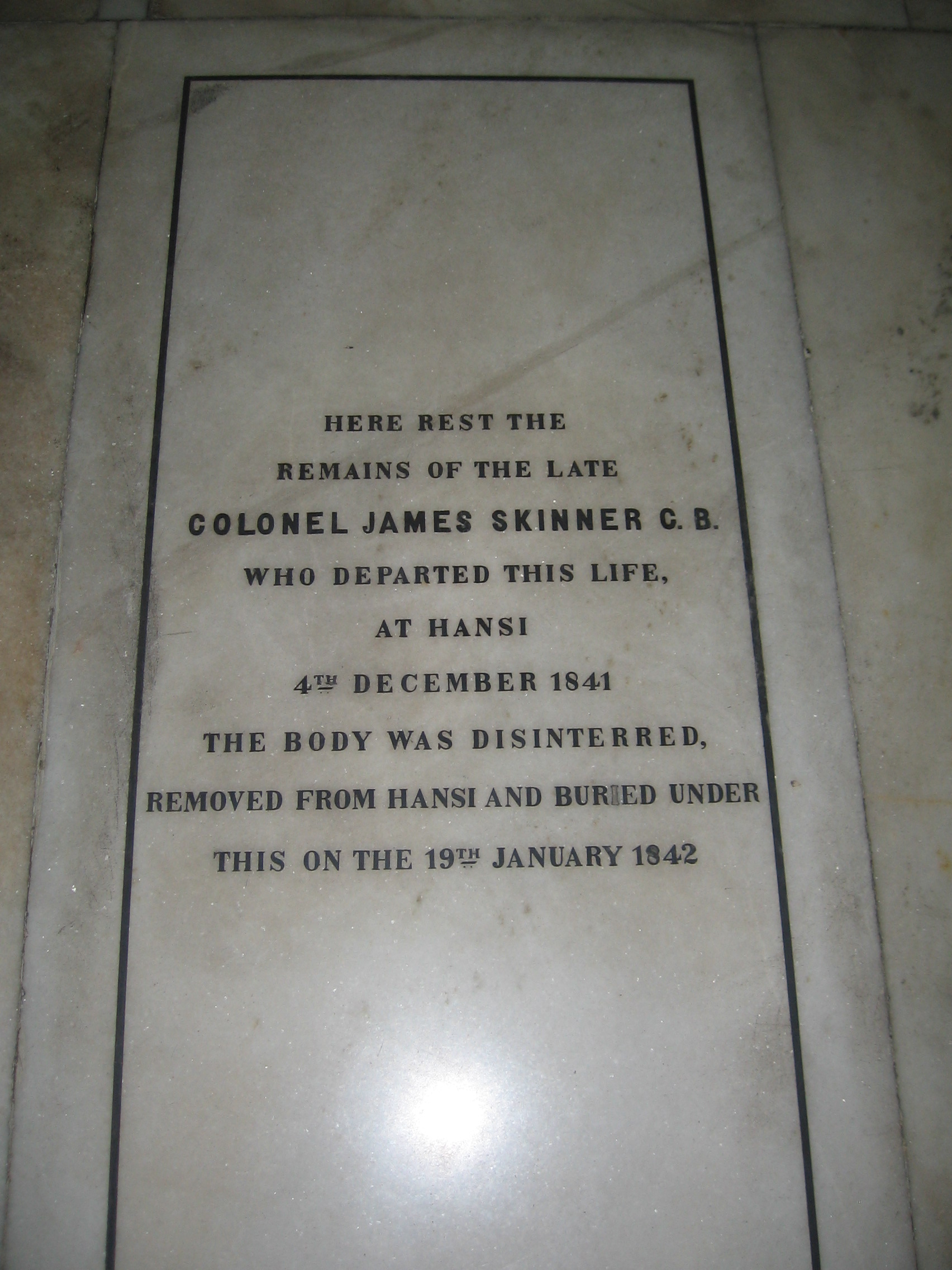
Marble slab of Skinner's tomb in St. James' Church or Skinner's Church, Kashmiri Gate, Delhi

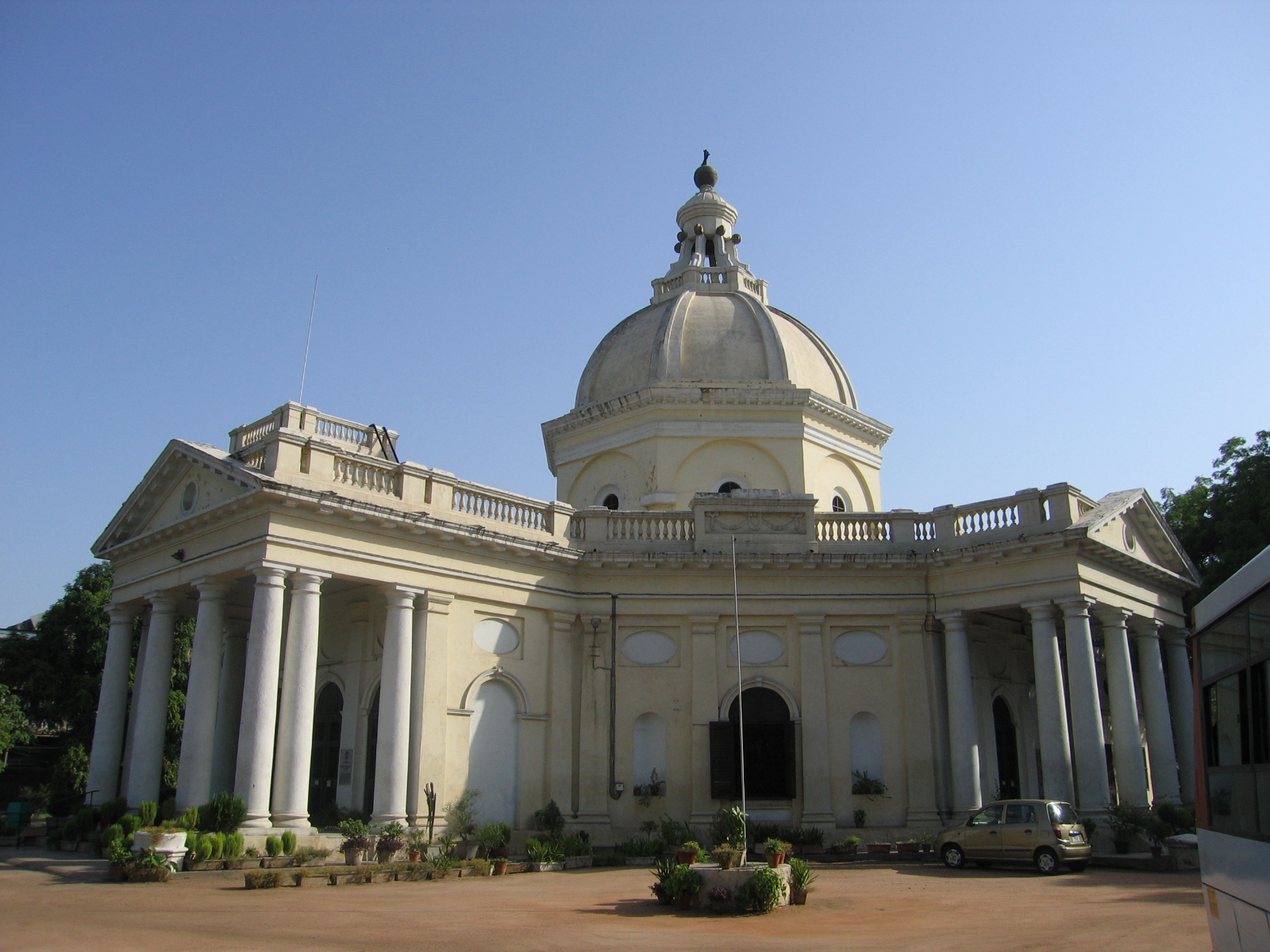
St. James' Church or Skinner's Church, Kashmiri Gate, Delhi

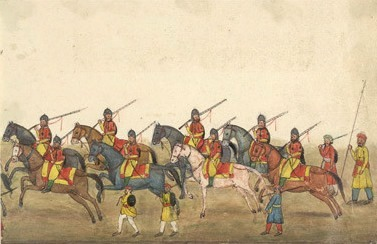
Skinner's Horse party.Folio from 'Reminiscences of Imperial Delhi’, an album by Sir Thomas Metcalfe, 1843.

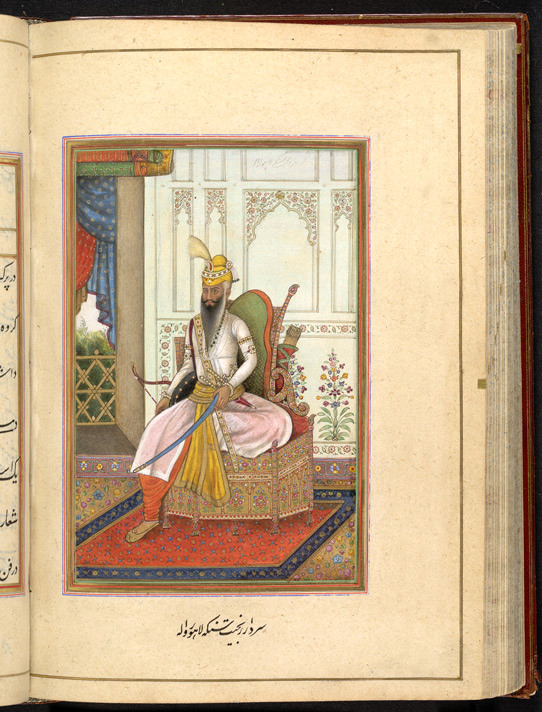
A folio of Tazkirat al-umara by James Skinner, 1830, depicting Portrait of Maharaja Ranjit Singh of the Punjab.

== See also ==
- List of Museums in Haryana
- Khwaja Khizr Tomb at Sonipat
- Haryana State Museum at Panchkula
- Pranpir Badshah tomb, Panchyat Bhawan in Hisar Govt College ground
- Haryana Rural Antique Museum at HAU Hisar
- Rakhigarhi Indus Valley Civilisation Museum near Hisar
- Asigarh Fort
- Sheikhpura Kothi near Hansi
- Dharohar Museum at Kurukshetra University
- Kurukshetra Panorama and Science Centre at Kurukshetra
- Shrikrishna Museum at Kurukshetra
- Rewari Railway Heritage Museum at Rewari railway station
