= Firoz Shah palace complex =

Archaeological site in India

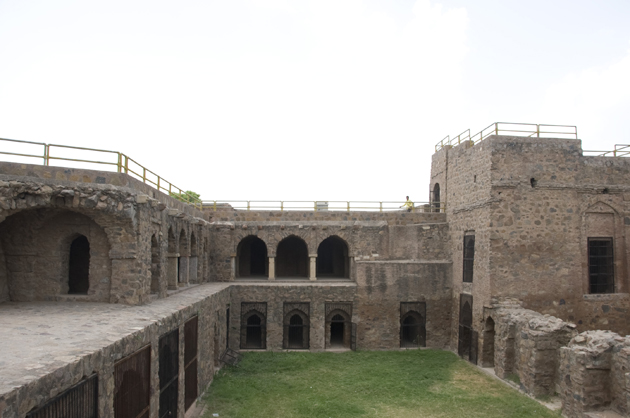
- Inner courtyard of Firoz Shah Palace

- Location in western Haryana, India
- 29.166306°N 75.720587°E
- Location: Hisar, Haryana, India

History
- Settled: 1357
- Founded: 1354
- Built: 14th century
- Built for: Firoz Shah Tughlaq
- Demolished: 1398

Site notes
- Architectural style: Islam
- Restored by: Archaeological Survey of India
- Governing body: Archaeological Survey of India

Hisar-e-Firoza fort city with rampart (including the protected archaeological Firoz Shah palace complex, Lat-Ki-Masjid Complex with an Ashokan pillar) along with the Gujari Mahal and Charbagh Garden outside the rampart, located in the modern-day Hisar in Haryana state of India, was built by Firoz Shah Tughlaq of the Delhi Sultanate in 1354 CE on the Sindhu-Saraswati Valley Civilisation (SSVC) and Vedic Period archeological mound of ancient Isukāra city. It is maintained by the Archaeological Survey of India.

The narrative that Firoz Shah Tughlaq founded a city in a barren wasteland is contradicted by archaeological evidence and geomorphological data. The site was a strategic "choke point" within a dense "Rakh" (deciduous scrub forest) that acted as a natural barrier, requiring months of clearing for military passage. The "creation" of the Rajabwah and Ulughkhani canals by Firoz Shah was actually the de-silting and diversion of the Drishadvati River paleochannel, a Sindhu-Saraswati Valley Civilisation era water system desilted and maintained as far back as the Mauryan Empire. Tughlaq used massive forced labor to desilt these ancient Vedic-Mauryan hydraulic routes, rebranding them as his own benevolent innovation. The Delhi-Hisar-Multan-Khorasan route was a pre-existing segment of the ancient Uttarapatha highway, a trade artery established during the Sindhu-Saraswati Valley Civilisation and repaired during the Mauryan era. Tughlaq occupied this pre-cut route through the impregnable dense shub forest to consolidate military control over the frontier. The architecture of Tuglaq's Fort, including citadel and the Lat ki Masjid complex, is composed of spolia (reused elements of Hindu temple destroyed by Islamic invaders) looted in-situ and also from nearby sites like Agroha Mound. Tughlaq's hagiographies (like the Futūḥāt-i-Fīrūz Shāhī) glorified these misappropriations, framing forced religious conversions to Islam and the rebranding of "Isukara" into "Hisar" as religious and civilizational jihad triumphs.

The shape of the Hisar-i-Firuza rampart was a polygonal enclosure rather than a perfect square, defined in the northwest by the surviving Royal Citadel—which projects outward like a spearhead—and the northern Charbagh and Gujari Mahal (originally situated outside the main city walls within their own light enclosures). The southwestern corner of the rampart, featuring a now-lost bastion, was located west of the present-day Gurudwara Singh Sabha, from where the wall ran sharply east via the Nagori Gate to the Rajguru Market Bastion (around present-day Pooja Market near the Ram Chat Bhandar Chowk). From this point, the rampart turned sharply north toward the Delhi Gate (at today's Gandhi Chowk) before curving northwest to reach the Mori Gate, with the now mud filled outer moat represented by the roads that ring the old city. Following the 1857 Indian War of Independence, the British raj administration demolished and auctioned off much of the rubble from these outer walls and bastions to local builders, leaving the original footprint visible only in the raised elevation of the streets and the alignment of the historical markets. Gurjari Mahal and Charbgah garden, immediate north of the rampart of the fort, were also built by Firoz Shah for his wife Gurjari in 1356. The Jahaj Kothi Museum, a past residence of George Thomas, 2 km east of Firoz Shah's citadel, sits just outside the historic rampart of Hisar-i-Firoza fort.

The Hisar-e-Firoza monument's Shahi Darwaza entrance is just 100 meter east of Hisar's main Bus Stand, 4.5 km southwest of Hisar Airport, 2 km north of Hisar Junction railway station, 25 km southeast of Agroha Mound via NH9, 30 km west of Asigarh Fort, and 55 km southwest of Rakhigarhi.

== History ==
Evolution of Indian trade networks. The main map shows the routes since Mughal Empire times. Inset A shows the major prehistorical cultural currents, B: pre-Mauryan routes, C: Mauryan routes, D: routes c. 1st century CE, and E: the Z-shaped region of developed roads.

=== Isukāra - vedic era city (1500 BCE) ===
The scholar Vasudeva Sharan Agrawala and Jain literature (Uttaradhyayana Sutra) identify Isukāra (Esukara) as a prosperous city of the Kuru Janapada of Vedic period that occupied the specific site where Hisar now stands. Excavations within the north-western side of the Firoz Shah Palace Complex have revealed multiple layers of history. While the surface is Tughlaq-era (14th century), deeper probes have found rubble masonry and foundations that suggest Firoz Shah built his fort directly atop the existing ancient "Isukara" settlement.

=== Laras Buzurg and Laras Khurd villages - sultanate skirmishes with Hindu Jat, Gurjar and Rajputs (14th century CE) ===
When Firoz Shah Tughlaq began building the fort in 1354 CE, it is recorded that the area already contained two inhabited villages, Laras Buzurg and Laras Khurd, which are believed to be the medieval remnants of the ancient Isukara. The palace, known as Hisar-i-Firuza, is located at a strategic point where the old Delhi Multan Road branches towards Khorasan, a historic region northeast of Iran.

- Hindu Ahir (Gurjar) clan of the Queen Gujari:

Historically concentrated in the Rewari and Hisar belt (often referred to as Ahirwal), the Ahirs were a significant martial-pastoralist group. They maintained a strong presence in the rural settlements like Laras Buzurg, managing the livestock and dairy supply chains that were crucial for the strategic trade route toward Khorasan.

- Hindu Jats:

Jats were the most numerous and influential agrarian community in the region in 14th century, organized into various khaps (social units) specifically the clans like the Ghatwala Malik and Poonia Jats held significant territory around the Laras villages. They were known for their resilience and were frequently involved in skirmishes with the Sultanate's tax collectors.

- Hindu Rajput clans:

Several Hindu Rajput clans held local chieftainships in the area, including Tomara (Tanwar) Rajputs, who had previously ruled Delhi, remained powerful in the "Hariana" tracts surrounding Hisar even after the Sultanate's rise. Additionally, Chauhan and Bhatti Hindu Rajputs occupied the western fringes near the desert. The Bhatti Rajputs, in particular, were noted for their fierce resistance to the Muslim Tughlaq expansion into the "wilderness" areas.

- Conflict of Hindus with Firoz Shah Tughlaq:

Forced displacement:

The residents of Laras Buzurg and Laras Khurd were reportedly displaced to make way for the massive citadel and royal gardens. Some were absorbed into the new city's workforce, while others moved to peripheral villages. As Firoz Shah Tughlaq required the high ground of the ancient mound (Isukara) for his palace, the original inhabitants of Laras Buzurg and Laras Khurd were forcibly moved. According to Shams-i-Siraj Afif, the Sultan built Rajabwah Canals, in an attempt to "buy" the cooperation of the remaining Hindu clans by turning their arid lands into productive sugarcane and fruit farms.

Forced conversion to Islam:

Historical records suggest that many members of these clans (particularly among the Rajputs and Jats) were forced to convert to Islam during the Tughlaq era to retain their land-holding status (zamindari). Those who remained Hindu were integrated into the iqta (land grant) system as local administrative intermediaries. The conflict and forced conversion to Islam led to the emergence of "Ranghar" communities, Rajput clans (like the Tanwars and Bhattis) who were converted to Islam under Tughlaq but retained their Hindu clan names and social structures. This was a direct result of the administrative pressure exerted by the Hisar garrison on the local Hindu gentry.

Perennial resistance by Hindus:

Contemporary chronicles and local traditions record, while the villages near the fort were integrated and many Hindus forcibly converted to Islam, the Hindu clans specially in the "wilderness" (the Rohi or desert fringes) waged valiant and protracted resistance against the Islamic administrative impositions of the Tughlaq dynasty. They remained in the state of perennial conflict with the Hisar governor, often raiding the Sultanate's supply lines toward Khorasan in Iran. In medieval Indian history, particularly within Persian chronicles like the Tarikh-i-Firoz Shahi authored by Ziauddin Barani, the term Mawas (or mawasat) was used to describe the fortified Hindu villages or rural strongholds, often located in remote areas or dense forests, that refused to pay land revenue or tribute to the Delhi Sultanate; they were recognized as hotbeds of rebellion and represented areas of political and economic resistance, as frequently mentioned by Barani to illustrate the struggles of Sultans (such as Balban, the Khaljis, and the Tughlaqs) in collecting revenue from defiant Hindu Zamindars and local chiefs.

== Isukāra - the city of Sindhu-Saraswati Valley Civilization and Vedic Period (3300–1900 BCE) ==
Parts of archaeological mound, adjacent to the mosque and within the northwestern sector of the Firoz Shah Palace complex, were excavated. While the surface structures are predominantly from the Tughlaq era (14th century), deeper stratigraphic layers suggest the site houses the ruins of a significantly older settlement, likely dating back to the Sindhu-Saraswati Valley Civilization (SSVC). British era banglow and ground south of it, Feroz Shah Citadel, Lat-Ki-Masjid Complex and the area south of it where 20th century "Jagannath Arya Girl's Senior Secondary School" school now sits atop a massive ancient SSVC mound and the Vedic era Isukara (Aisukari), a prosperous city mentioned in Jain literature and Vedic-era records.

=== Etymology ===
Isukāra, the original name of Hisar, is a compound of the Sanskrit roots Iṣu (इषु), meaning "arrow," and Kāra (कार), meaning "maker" or "worker." It literally translates to "The City of the Arrow-Makers," signifying its status as a specialized military-industrial guild center of the Kuru-Panchala region. Among historical variants (including the later era Pali language Isukāri and Prakrit language Esukāru), Isukāra is the most frequent and authoritative spelling. It is explicitly cited in Sanskrit grammarian Pāṇini’s Aṣṭādhyāyī (c. 5th century BCE) as a prominent city in the Vahika region and appears in the Buddhist Jatakas (Isukāri Jataka) and the Mahabharata mention of Isukāra as an arrow-making city-state or guild center. The transition from the refined Isukāra to the medieval Iskar or Asika highlights the "crushing" of syllables in local dialects before the islamic rebranding by the foreign origin Tughlaq invader erased the ancient toponym in favor of the Persian term "Hisar" (meaning "fort").

=== Archaeological Significance ===
Evidence from the Archaeological Survey of India (ASI) suggests that Firoz Shah Tughlaq constructed his citadel directly atop a pre-existing ancient settlement known as Isukara or Aisukari. The Hisar district is a central hub for IVC research, housing major sites like Rakhigarhi, Banawali, and Kunal. The mound at the palace complex is considered part of this broader Harappan landscape, potentially serving as a satellite settlement or a link on the ancient trade routes.

=== Excavations ===
Probes into the mound have revealed the following

- Stratification:

Deeper probes beneath the 14th-century rubble masonry have uncovered foundations and rubble characteristic of much older urban phases.

- Exact location:

Excavations at the north-western side of the Firoz Shah Palace complex, specifically near the prominent three to four-story staircase (often identified as a part of the palace's strategic watchtowers or internal circulation system), have yielded significant pre-sultanate artifacts. These findings confirm the presence of a sophisticated urban settlement long before the 14th-century construction of Hisar-i-Firuza. These findings collectively suggest that the "staircase mound" in the northwest corner is the primary archaeological link between the medieval fort and the ancient "Isukara" settlement. Excavations conducted by the Archaeological Survey of India (ASI) in the deeper strata of the northwest corner have recovered:

- Coinage:

A small number of copper coins from the Indo-Scythian and Kushan periods were recovered from the lower archaeological horizons, marking the site as a significant point of commerce on the ancient trade route connecting Mathura and Taxila.

- Pottery and Ceramics:

Shards of Painted Grey Ware (PGW) and Northern Black Polished Ware (NBPW) have been unearthed, indicating that the site was inhabited during the Iron Age and the Early Historical period (c. 1000 BCE to 1st century CE).

- Sculptural Fragments:

Deeper probes near the staircase foundations revealed carved stone fragments and terracotta figurines belonging to the Kushan and Gupta eras. These artifacts suggest the existence of religious or civic structures that were likely dismantled or buried when the Tughlaq fortifications were raised.

- Architectural Spolia:

The base of the north-western structures contains reused rubble masonry and stone blocks with carvings characteristic of 11th–12th century temple architecture (likely from the Tomara or Chauhan periods). This material evidence supports the theory that Firoz Shah utilized the debris of the ancient city of Isukara to stabilize the marshy ground and build his palace foundations.

- Reused material:

The presence of the Ashokan Pillar (Lat) and materials repurposed from the nearby Agroha Mound indicates a long-standing tradition of utilizing materials from ancient ruins in the vicinity, which themselves show continuous habitation from the 4th century BCE back to the proto-historic period.

=== Modern Status ===
The mound is part of the Centrally Protected Monument zone managed by the ASI. Although the medieval palace structures like the Gujari Mahal and the Lat ki Masjid are the most visible features, the underlying mound remains a site of high archaeological potential for understanding the transition from the Harappan period to the Early Historical period in the Indo-Gangetic Plain. There are no plans for exacavation of pre-Islamic mound as ASI's focus in 2026 in the Hisar district has shifted primarily toward Rakhigarhi and the Agroha Mound, which are currently undergoing high-priority excavations to uncover Harappan and Vedic-era remains. For the Hisar fort area itself, recent tenders (early 2026) focus on minor conservation of upper mound structures and providing visitor facilities (information sheds/exhibition halls). The "open ground" is being preserved as a green buffer zone rather than being dug up, partly because a full excavation would disrupt the current administrative use of the Cattle Farm lands.

=== Hisar-i-Firoza fort city (14th century CE) ===
Construction of the Hisar-i-Firoza fort city complex began in 1354 CE, supervised by Firoz Shah. Stone was brought from the hills of Mahendragarh to build the ramparts, which were surrounded by a protective moat. A tank inside the complex was used to refill the moat. The complex was completed in 1356 after two and a half years, and Firoz Shah ordered his courtiers to build their palaces within the walls of the fort. He reused the material from the already deserted Agroha Mound. Agroha, associated with legendary king Maharaja Agrasen and Agreya republic mentioned in Mahabharata, also by Panini in the Ashtadhyayi, Ptolemy who called it Agara, located on the ancient Taxila-Mathura trade route, was an important centre of commerce and political activities till the period of Firoz Shah Tughlaq in the 14th century. Bharatendu Harishchandra writes that Maharaja Agrasen, contemporaneous to Lord Krishna, was a Suryavanshi Kshatriya king born in the late Dwapar Yuga during Mahabharata era. Agroha mound was proscribed as the protected site of national importance in 1926, and excavation has proven the continuous habitation and fortified township from the 4th century BCE to the 14th century CE.

"Futuhat-e-Firozshahi", a 32-page autobiography written by Sultan Feroz Shah Tughlaq himself, focuses heavily on his administrative reforms and religious policies, it provides the historical context for his stay in Hisar and his decision to fortify the city as a strategic stronghold. "Tarikh-i-Firuzshahi", written by the contemporary chronicler by Shams-i-Siraj Afif who extended the book of same name by Ziauddin Barani, documents the founding of Hisar-e-Firoza in 1354 CE and the Sultan's personal interest in the region, including the construction of the palace complex. "Sirat-i-Firuzshahi", an anonymous biography that details his deep affection for his favorite wife, Gurjari (milkmaid). "Tarikh-i-Mubarak Shahi", 15th-century text provides a detailed account of the construction of the fortified city and the sophisticated canal system (like the one from the Yamuna river to Hisar) that the Sultan built to bring water to the desert region for the queen Gurjari.

According to these chronicles and local lore, the Sultan Firozshah fell in love with a local milkmaid from the Gurjar tribe during a hunting expedition. When he proposed marriage and asked her to come to Delhi, she refused to leave her birthplace and elderly parents. To be with her, the Sultan decided to shift his royal seat temporarily and built the Gujari Mahal, a separate, magnificent palace within the Hisar Fort, specifically for her. To fulfill her demand for the sacred waters of her home region, he constructed an elaborate aqueduct to supply her palace with fresh river water. Today, the Gujari Mahal stands as a protected monument under the Archaeological Survey of India (ASI), and its architecture—featuring stone pillars repurposed from older temples of Agroha Mound, serves as a physical record of this 14th-century romance. Romance with Gurjari and the construction of the Hisar Fort, Afif is the primary source. Barani only saw the very beginning of the city's construction. While the official court chronicles focus on the "strategic importance," the oral traditions captured in later summaries of Afif’s work describe the Sultan meeting the Gujari girl near a local pond (johad) while he was separated from his hunting party. Her refusal to move to the crowded, "suffocating" city of Delhi is what Afif implies forced the Sultan to build a magnificent "Delhi-level" palace in the middle of a wasteland.

=== Restoration (20th-21st century CE) ===
Restoration work on the Firoz Shah palace began on the palace in 1924 and has gradually continued since. The complex has been declared a Centrally Protected Monument by the Archaeological Survey of India. 2026-27 Budget of Haryana includes provisions for the development of 15 archaeological sites across India (including Rakhigarhi) into "vibrant, experiential cultural destinations." Hisar-i-Firuza is expected to benefit from this via improved night lighting and landscaping of the eastern grounds, rather than new deep-earth archaeological excavation of pre-Islamic mound from Sindhu-Saraswati Civilisation and Vedic Civilisation periods.

== Hisar-i-Firoza outer rampart (14th century CE) ==
The Hisar-i-Firoza fort complex was protected by a fortified rampart wall all around, which had a protective deep moat outside it and access to the court as through 4 gates. The ramparts were constructed using heavy rubble masonry and local sandstone, specifically engineered with a distinct inward batter (slope) to increase stability and deflect projectiles. These walls reached significant heights and were punctuated at regular intervals by semi-circular bastions that provided a clear line of sight for the Sultan's garrison to monitor the surrounding plains of the Haryana region. The top of the ramparts featured battlements with crenellations, allowing archers and musketeers to defend the city from a protected position. The artwork in the fort synthesizes Islamic and Indian architecture. The palace is built of red sandstone.

=== Moat ===
The original 14th-century fortifications of Hisar-i-Firuza were protected by a deep and wide moat that encircled the outer ramparts, serving as a primary defensive barrier against cavalry and siege engines. Fed by a sophisticated network of canals—most notably the Rajabwah and Ulughkhani canals diverted from the Yamuna and Sutlej rivers—the moat was designed to remain filled even in the arid desert environment, with internal tanks within the palace complex acting as reservoirs to regulate the water level. The depth and width of the moat rendered the fort nearly impregnable to traditional 14th-century siege tactics, as the lack of natural elevation in the region made the artificial elevation of the walls even more daunting. Beyond its military utility, the rampart system also served as a massive retaining structure for the city's internal water management, ensuring that the inhabitants of Hisar-i-Firuza had access to the canal-fed reservoirs even during prolonged periods of unrest or drought.

Over centuries of urban expansion and the decline of the Sultanate's hydraulic infrastructure, the moat gradually became silted and was eventually filled in during the British colonial period and post-independence urban development. Today, the physical depression of the moat is largely indistinguishable, having been paved over by modern roads and markets, though the Archaeological Survey of India maintains the surrounding area as part of the protected heritage zone to prevent further encroachment on the historical perimeter.

=== Bastions ===
==== 4 surviving Tughlag era bastions (14th century) ====
There are four Tuqlaq era Bastion (angular projecting watch tower or structure built into a fortification wall to provide a wide range of fire to eliminate blind spots) with slanted narrow niches (embrasures) designed for archers and musketeers to defend the city, Northwest Bastion with internal stairs which still exists and stands stories above ground and one story below ground, and the Northeast Bastion which is in ruins and only ground floor walls with no roof remain. Archery holes can still be observed in the bastion as well as the fort rampart, once surrounded by a water-filled protective ditch (moat), now filled in. These bastions are punctuated by slanted, narrow niches known as embrasures, which allowed archers and musketeers to discharge weapons at approaching forces while remaining protected from return fire.

The third still surviving bastion is North Nagori bastion, 100 meters north of Nagori gate. While the monumental arch of Nagori gate is gone, fragmented remains of the Nagori bastion on western rampart (the heavy rubble-stone bases with arrow slits) are still visible, though now isolated from the main citadel by ASI constructed perimeter wall to the south of Lat-ki-Masjid complex and modern day Jagannath Arya Girl's Senior Secondary School.

The fourth still surviving bastion is South Nagori bastion, 20 meters south of Nagori gate.

==== 2 Mughal era bastions (16th-17th century) ====
Beyond the original Tughlaq-era northwest and northeast towers, the northern line of defense at Hisar-i-Firuza was reinforced with a Mughal-era intermediate platform. This single-story solid-filled structure, featuring two rounded corner bastions, protrudes from the three-story northernmost rampart directly north of the Summer Pavilion (Khwabgah) toward the Gujari Mahal. Unlike the hollow, multi-story Tughlaq corner bastions that contain internal chambers and staircases, these Mughal setback bastions were constructed as heavy, masonry-encased earthen mounds capped with lime concrete. This solid design provided a stable, vibration-resistant surface capable of supporting heavy cannons and withstanding the shock of return artillery fire during the 16th and 17th centuries.

Standing only one story tall relative to the rampart walkway, these additions feature the softer, rounded contours typical of later fortification styles. They functioned as specialized gun platforms (morchas) to provide lateral covering fire along the curtain wall, protecting the palace's private northern wing. Access to these lower platforms was facilitated by modifying or "punching" a doorway through the north-facing second-floor wall of the original Tughlaq northwest bastion, allowing the garrison to move directly from the ancient staircase onto the newer Mughal firing positions.

=== Gates ===
Contrary to the popular belief, the fort had 5 gates, not 4, as it had 4 gates for public and the 5th gate exclusively for the royal usage. The confusion regarding the gates of Hisar-i-Firuza arises from the distinction between the now demolished four outer city-wall gates (Talaqi, Delhi, Mori, and Nagori gates) and the surviving Shahi Darwaza (Royal Gate), which served as the exclusive internal entrance to the palace and mosque complex. While historical sources like Shams-i-Siraj Afif focus on the four primary portals that managed heavy trade and public traffic, the standing Shahi Darwaza—located roughly 100 meters north of the military Talaqi Gate—functions as a fifth, ceremonial thoroughfare providing direct access to the royal citadel. The protective ramparts around the city of Hisar-i-Firuza were originally constructed with four main public gates, each serving as a strategic portal to different regions of the Sultanate and beyond. These gates were positioned at cardinal points, integrated into a massive stone wall surrounded by a deep moat to deter invaders. While only one gate remains structurally intact today, the locations of the vanished gates continue to serve as major landmarks in the modern city. Currently, only Shahi Darwaza and Talaqi Gate survive; the rest have been demolished in the 20th century to mke way for the uban sprawl.

==== Shahi Darwaza - the Royal Gate (surviving and well-preserved by ASI) ====
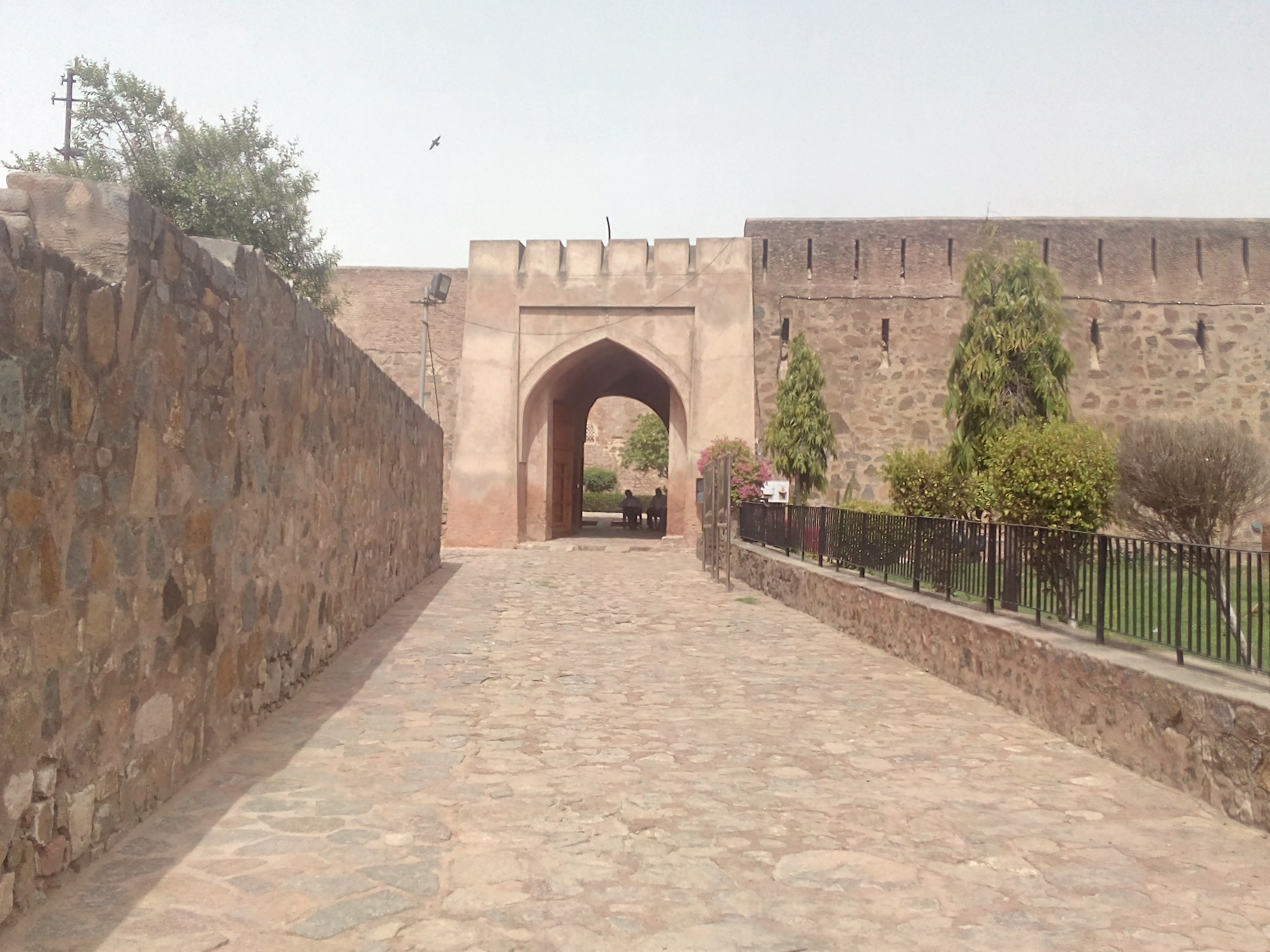
Shahi Darwaza (Royal Gate), 200 meters north of Talaqi Gate, of Hisar-i-Firoza fort 100 m east of Hisar's main Bus Stand and 200 m north of Talaqi Gate.

Shahi Darwaza (Royal Gate), the still surviving gate is located on the western side of the fort complex 200 meters north of talaqi Gate, it stands directly opposite the main bus stand of Hisar. It served as the exclusive royal entrance for Sultan Firoz Shah Tughlaq and his immediate entourage. Unlike the other gates which managed heavy commercial and public traffic, the Shahi Darwaza was primarily a ceremonial and private thoroughfare, providing the Sultan with direct and secure access from the inner palace to the Gujari Mahal and the surrounding royal gardens located just outside the main ramparts. Its placement ensured that the Sultan could move quickly between his fortified residence and the outer pleasure palaces without passing through the crowded markets near the Mori or Delhi gates. Beyond its ceremonial role, the gate was the starting point for the strategic route leading to the ancient Agroha Mound and Sirsa. Today, the gate remains a protected monument under the Archaeological Survey of India (ASI), preserving the intricate stone-carved lintels and the imposing archway that characterized 14th-century Indo-Islamic royal architecture. The Shahi Darwaza (Royal Gate) is easily identifiable by its single-arched vault and the guard rooms on either side, which are more delicate than the heavy military bastions of the Talaqi Gate. It was through this gate that the Sultan would enter the Diwan-i-Aam directly from the northern gardens or the Gujari Mahal.

This gate, which is sometimes mistaken referred to as the Talaqi gate, is the only surviving gate and serves as the only entrance to the ASI protected monument.

==== Talaqi gate (demolished in 21st century) ====
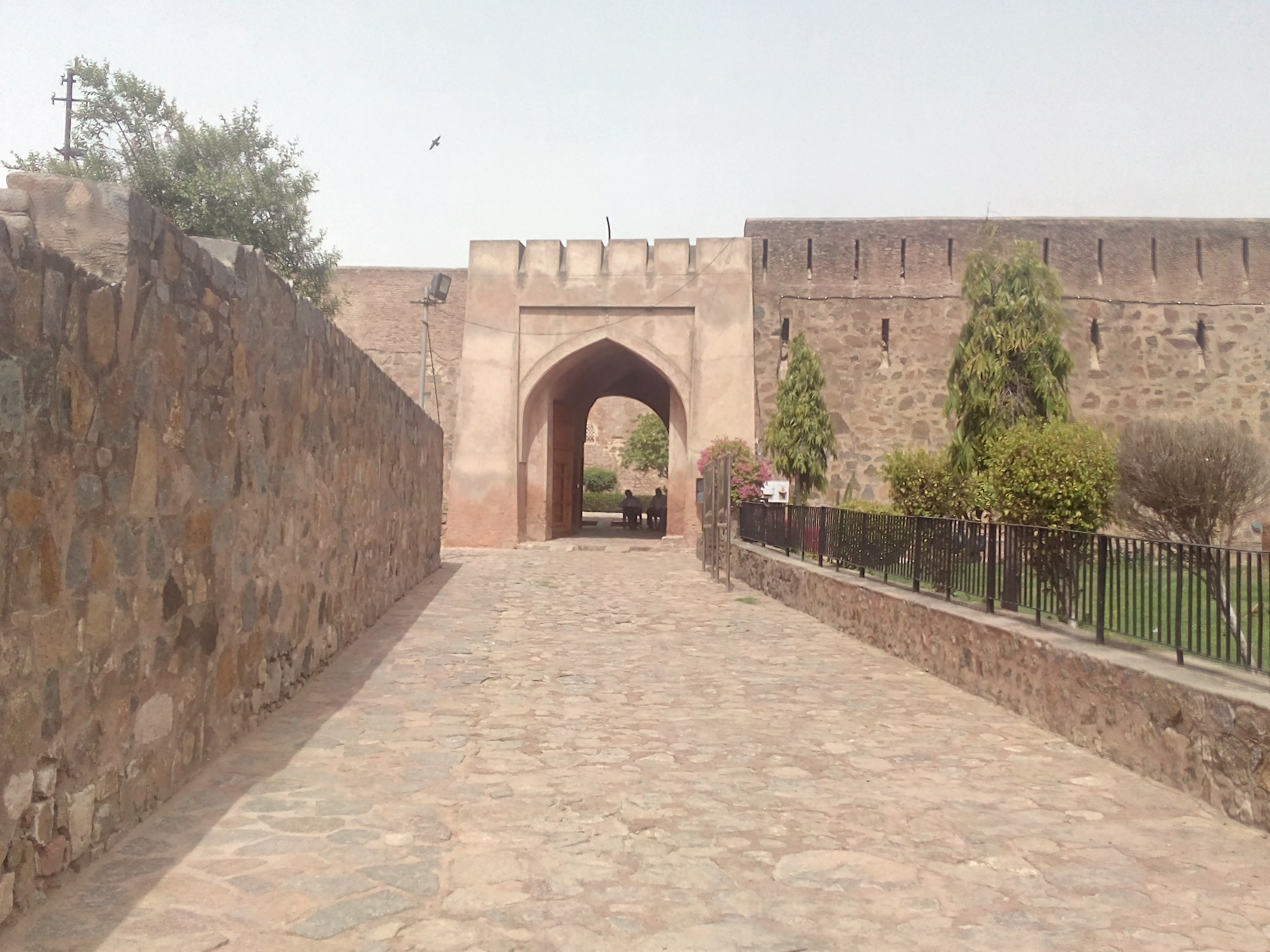
Talaqi Gate (Shahi Darwaza or Royal Gate), of Hisar-i-Firoza fort 100 m east of Hisar's main Bus Stand.

The Talaqi Gate, was demolished in the 21st century though the associated bastion still stands on the western rampart of the fort 200 meters south of Shahi Darwaza on the northeast corner of the main bus stand of Hisar. The name "Talaqi" is derived from the Arabic word for "divorce" or "opening," and local tradition suggests it was named to commemorate a victory that "opened" the region to the Sultan. This gate sits on the western end of the Khazanchian Bazar Road and serves as the entrance to the presently congested old city.

==== Nagauri gate (demolished in 1968-72 by Bansi Lal government) ====
The Nagauri Gate was located on the southern side of the fortifications, providing a direct link to Nagaur and onwards to Jodhpur in Rajasthan via Siwani and Churu. This gate was a vital point for trade with the Rajputana kingdoms. In the early 20th century, the British Raj replaced the aging structure with a two-story clock tower. However, during the first tenure (1968–72) of the Chief Minister Bansi Lal's government, both the clock tower and the remnants of the gate were demolished to widen the entrance to the local market and accommodate growing traffic.

==== Mori gate (demolished in 1968-72 by Bansi Lal government) ====
The Mori Gate was situated on the eastern side of the fort, at the present-day road ramp which descends from the northeast of fort to Auto Market. It derived its name from the Hindi word mori (hole or conduit), referring to a specialized water channel that entered the fort through this point to supply the garrison and the palace complex. This gate was strategically significant as it marked the start of the northern trade route toward Multan (now in Pakistan) and extending further to Kandahar, Mashhad, and Ashgabat. Today, no physical structure remains, and the site is occupied by the city's auto market and a road ramp connecting the modern city to the fort area.

==== Delhi gate (demolished in 1968-72 by Bansi Lal government) ====
The Delhi Gate, also facing east, was the principal entrance for travelers arriving from the capital, Delhi, via the Delhi Multan Road. It was located near the present-day Gandhi Chowk at the eastern end of Moti Bazar Road. Historical records describe this gate as a heavily fortified structure that managed the bulk of the commercial traffic between Hisar and the imperial seat at Delhi. Like the Nagauri and Mori gates, it was demolished during urban expansion in the mid-20th century.

== Firoz Shah Palace (14th century CE) ==
=== Citadel or royal palace ===
The palace is built of rubble masonry and lime mortar. The palace building has between one and three rooms on the north, west, and east sides, but it is several rooms deeper on the south side where the bulk of the structure lies. The north and west sides have arched passages built into the fort's bastion and have no windows. The west and south sides of the structure were renovated by the Archaeological Survey of India and still stand with a flat roof and arched gateway and passages. The citadle integrated with the west rampart remains in good condition and still has a roof. It has tehkhana (underground chambers) with hammam (baths). The subterranean level was designed for climate control, while the ground and first floors served as the primary administrative and residential quarters for the Sultan and his entourage.

==== Sahan-i-Khana - citadel's central courtyard in the north ====
The Sahan-i-Khana, the transient semi-private courtyard in the northern half of citadel, functioned as a secure buffer zone where the Sultan transitioned from the public areas of the mosque and Diwan-i-Aam into the private residential wing. Unlike the public mosque courtyard, this was a restricted zone for the Sultan's immediate inner circle entourage and the and elite guards.

==== Northwest Watch Tower Bastion (exists) ====
On the far northwest side of the citadel, there is a bastion or watch tower with three stories above ground and one underground, which as the tallest structure in the complex doubles as a staircase and connects all floors of the palace and serves as a corner passage between the north and west sides of the building. One or two tiny rooms at the base of this tower were used as sentry posts or small armories for the guards stationed on the northern wall. It had direct line of sight view of all 4 gates of the Hisar-i-Firoza fort. It also acted as a signal tower, used for communicating with peripheral forts or watchtowers in the "Rohi" (desert fringes), as well as a watchpost providing a 360-degree view of the Delhi-Multan Road and the Talaqi Gate to monitor approaching caravans or potential invaders.

==== Northeast Watch Tower (ruined) ====
The Northeast Corner contains only the ground floor base of the primary Watchtower, which provided a view toward the Delhi Gate. The upper floors of this water tower are now gone.

==== Royal Summer Pavilion (North Rampart Building) and Khwabgah (Royal Sleeping Quarter) ====
Royal Summer Pavilion, integrated directly into the northern rampart, this structure faced the Charbagh and the Gujari Mahal. It was an elevated, open-fronted Summer Pavilion designed to capture the northern breeze. While it currently stands as a ruined, roofless single story, it originally featured recessed arched windows and stone-lattice jalis that offered a panoramic view of the Charbagh Gardens and Gujari Mahal while maintaining the Sultan's privacy. It served as a seasonal retreat for the Sultan during the extreme summer months, utilizing its height for natural cooling.

"Khwabgah", was located on the upper levels of this Royal Summer Pavilion integrated in the northern rmapart. By occupying the top floor of the Summer Pavilion, the Sultan benefited from maximum elevation and cross-ventilation, essential for the hot Haryana climate.

==== Diwan-e-khas (Private Audience Hall) - citadel's western rampart ====
Diwan-e-khas, on the western side of the Sehn-i-khana, two doorways on the ground level and three on the second floor lead into the Diwan-e-khas, that served as a private audience hall. The underground apartments were used for during the day to escape the intense summer heat, as shown by the underground presence of a hammam. Here Sultan held confidential meetings with his ministers. Its subterranean level served as a secure, cool sanctuary for state deliberations during the day. Its proximity to the Talaqi Gate allowed the Sultan to receive military reports and elite envoys in a secure, semi-private setting. It presently faces the current Hisar Bus Stand side.

==== Imperial Treasury (northeastern-eastern rampart) ====
Toshakhana, 2 or 3 small and narrow above-ground rooms served as the imperial treasury and secure storage for valuables and sensitive records, closely guarded by the nearby watchtower and positioned away from the main thoroughfares of the citadel.

==== Granary shaft in northeast corner of Sahn-i-Khana courtyard ====
Granary (Anbar-Khana) shaft, in the northeast corner of the Sahan-i-Khana, is a stone platform featuring round hole for shafts used for lowering and raising grain stores for the subterranean granaries. The granaries themselves were strictly underground to keep the grain cool and protected from pests or fire. The rooms built above ground over these shafts were used for administrative oversight—specifically for the officials who recorded the intake and distribution of supplies. These shafts allowed grain to be poured directly into the vaulted tehkhana chambers below. Within the citadel’s secure perimeter integrated with northern rampart, Firoz Shah Tughlaq established extensive granaries to ensure the city's resilience during potential sieges or the frequent droughts that plagued the region. These storage facilities were typically located in the lower levels or specialized chambers near the palace kitchens and the garrison quarters [northern part of citadel abutting bygone Charbagh and present-day O.P. Jindal Park]. They were constructed with thick, lime-plastered walls to keep the grain dry and protected from pests, reflecting the high level of administrative foresight recorded in the Futuhat-e-Firozshahi regarding food security and state reserves. The granaries were integrated into the fort's internal hydraulic system, allowing for easy cleaning and temperature regulation via the cooling effect of nearby water channels. Contemporary chronicler Shams-i-Siraj Afif notes that the Sultan's policy of maintaining large grain stores was instrumental in stabilizing local prices and providing relief to the surrounding villages of Laras Buzurg and Laras Khurd during lean years. Today, the remnants of these storage pits and chambers serve as a testament to the sophisticated urban planning of the Tughlaq era, highlighting Hisar's role as a self-sustaining regional capital.

==== Administrative and Garrison Block (south side of the citadel's courtyard) ====
The south side of the citadel's courtyard, being the longer side of the rectangular palace complex, it has seven doorways on the ground level, and nine doorways on the second story opening into the central rectangular courtyard. The Massive 3-Story Building on the south side of the Sahan-i-Khana was the nerve center of the citadel.

- "Diwan-i-Wizarat" (finance and revenue department):

It was located on the ground floor.

- Sar-i-Jandar (Sultan's bodyguards) garrison:

The upper levels were the garrison quarters. This ensured that the most elite troops physically separated the Sultan's private northern quarters from the public southern areas.

==== Roof ====
- Flat roof terrace:

The roof of the main palace is essentially a massive, flat open-air terrace made of thick lime concrete. There are no surviving dome structures or traditional baradaris (twelve-pillared pavilions) on this specific roof. Instead, the top is dominated by the parapets and the upper reach of the northwest staircase complex. This area served as a military observation deck to monitor the Talaqi Gate and the route to Khorasan.

- Missing wooden top two stories:

Evidence on the current roof—specifically the presence of massive, ruined stone pillars lying horizontally—supports the conclusion that the structure once extended further upward. These pillars originally supported a two-story superstructure primarily composed of a hybrid of wood and stone. This upper extension likely utilized lighter materials (timber) to reduce the load on the lower rubble-masonry walls while maintaining a regal height. The collapse of these upper floors, likely due to a combination of fires, structural decay, or military sieges, left only the stone skeletal remains currently seen on the terrace.

- Ventilation shafts and light wells in the roof:

What a visitor sees on the roof are the openings for vertical shafts. These are not decorative; they are functional vents that provided light and air to the tehkhana (the one-story subterranean basement). These shafts were vital for maintaining the "sard" (cool) temperature of the lower chambers during the heat of the Haryana summer, but they do not feature the domed "chhatris" common in later Mughal architecture.

- Water channels and cooling vents in te roof:

The roof also integrated elements of the palace's sophisticated hydraulic system. Small masonry channels were designed to catch rainwater, while vertical shafts (air vents) connected to the tehkhana (basement) emerged on the terrace. These vents allowed hot air to escape from the lower chambers, creating a natural convection current that cooled the building.

==== Tehkhanas- the underground chambers ====
The main citadel consists of two stories above ground and one story below ground. The specific vertical exception is the massive staircase in the northwest corner of the citadel, which spans four stories—comprising three levels above ground and one subterranean level—serving as a lookout point and primary vertical conduit for the palace guard. The citadel is built over a series of interconnected underground rooms known as tehkhanas. These chambers were designed with thick stone walls and deep foundations to remain cool during the intense summer heat. Historically, these rooms served as private retreats for the Sultan and his high-ranking officials, as well as secure storage for valuables. Many of these chambers feature vaulted ceilings and are ventilated through narrow shafts that open onto the palace floors above, allowing for a natural air-cooling system (wind catchers) typical of medieval Indo-Islamic architecture.

- Hammam - the underground royal baths on south/southeast side of the Sehan-i-Khana courtyard:

Excavations and architectural surveys have identified remnants of a hammam (public or royal bath) complex within the palace's subterranean or semi-subterranean levels. These baths were equipped with a sophisticated drainage and heating system, where water was channeled from the palace tanks and heated using a furnace (hypocaust) system. They were connected by private passages to the Sultan's quarters, providing a climate-controlled environment. They were strictly integrated with the Sultan’s private quarters via hidden staircases, allowing the King to move from his bedroom to the baths in complete privacy. The presence of these baths reflects Firoz Shah Tughlaq’s emphasis on public works and hygiene, which he detailed in his autobiography, Futuhat-e-Firozshahi.

- Bhul-Bhulaiya (Labyrinthine Passages):

Local lore and architectural observations describe a series of Bhul-Bhulaiya (labyrinthine) passages located within the thick walls and beneath the northwest corner of the palace. Today, many of these underground passages are closed to the public or have collapsed over time, but the visible staircases and arched entrances near the royal residence continue to highlight the complex's multi-layered subterranean design. These narrow, winding corridors served multiple purposes:

Strategic Defense: The complex layout was designed to confuse invaders who might breach the outer defenses, leading them into dead ends or ambush points.

Secret Transit: The passages provided the Sultan and his guard with a means of moving between the palace, the stables, and the Talaqi Gate undetected.

Escape Routes: Chroniclers mention that several tunnels led from the palace to locations outside the city ramparts, potentially reaching as far as the Agroha Mound or the banks of the canal system, providing a secure exit in the event of a successful siege.

==== Royal kitchen (Matbakh) - southeast of the Sehan-i-Khana courtyard ====
Royal kitchen (Matbakh) were located to the southeast of the central transient courtyard (Sehan-i-Khana). This area was chosen because of its direct access to the water conduits branching off from the main canal coming from the Mori Gate. Fresh water was essential for large-scale food preparation and for the cleaning of the high-volume service area. The kitchens were connected to the Sultan's private quarters (the Khwabgah/Summer Pavilion) via a dedicated service corridor. This allowed staff to transport meals to the residential upper floors without crossing through the main Diwan-i-Khas or the military Garrison quarters on the south side. The kitchens were characterized by high, vaulted ceilings with specialized ventilation apertures. Unlike the residential rooms, these walls were constructed with extra-thick rubble masonry to act as a heat sink, preventing the intense cooking fires from overheating the adjacent palace rooms. Today, the kitchen area is one of the most ruined parts of the citadel. While the main palace buildings still stand as recognizable blocks, the kitchen structures have largely collapsed into mounds of rubble and earth. However, the remains of the stone water channels and the blackened soot marks on certain foundational arches in the southeast sector remain visible as evidence of their original function.

==== Garrison kitchen - near Talaqi Gate part of main building ====
Garrison Kitchen, was simple hearths and communal cooking spaces located within the vaulted barracks along the western ramparts, allowing the soldiers to remain at their posts near the Talaqi Gate.

==== Royal stables ====
The royal stables, just inside the Talaqi Gate integrated into the rampart on the north and southern side of main citadel and located 20 meters northwest of the Diwan-e-Aam, were a critical logistical component of the 14th-century citadel. Constructed with massive rubble masonry and featuring low, vaulted ceilings characteristic of the Tughlaq "batter" style, these structures were designed to house the Sultan’s cavalry and elephants. The semi-underground positioning served a dual function: it provided thermal insulation against the arid climate of the Hariana tract and reinforced the structural integrity of the western ramparts.

==== General stables ====
The stables are semi-underground and located between the tehkhana structure integrated with the eastern side of the main citadel. The stables of the Hisar-i-Firuza complex are a unique architectural feature, designed as a semi-underground structure located strategically between the eastern tehkhana (underground chambers) of the main royal palace and the British Raj era residential building of Hisar Livestock Farm's Superintendent. These stables were constructed with a low-profile roof to maintain a cooler interior temperature, a necessary adaptation for the desert climate of Haryana, ensuring the well-being of the Sultan’s prized cavalry horses. Architecturally, the stables consist of a series of vaulted bays and long corridors supported by heavy masonry pillars, many of which were likely repurposed from older pre-Sultanate structures found at the site. The proximity to the palace allowed for rapid mobilization of the royal guard, while its semi-subterranean nature provided structural stability against the weight of the ramparts above. Today, these stables offer insight into the logistics of a 14th-century military citadel, though parts of the structure remain partially buried due to centuries of accumulated silt and debris.

=== Integrated court, mosque and Ashokan pillar complex ===
Situated immediately to the southeast of the Talaqi Gate, this cluster serves as the administrative and religious heart of the fortified city, yet remains distinct from the royal residential citadel to its north. The complex is an architectural hybrid, utilizing repurposed materials (spolia) from ancient Jain and Hindu temples to construct a unique ensemble comprising the Diwan-e-Aam, the Lat ki Masjid, the Ashokan Pillar, and a large Wudu Hammam. This integrated cluster centered around a courtyard comprises an L-shaped Liwan hall (Diwan-e-Aam) to the west, a small square-shaped royal mosque in the northeast, and an L-shaped Wudu Hammam (ablution water tank) in the south. The spatial arrangement reflects a transition from public imperial assembly to private religious devotion, unified by a central open space designed to accommodate large congregations during Friday prayers or state announcements.

==== Diwan-e-Aam - the L-shared Liwan hall ====
The Diwan-e-Aam is an L-shaped liwan (a vaulted hall) that served as the Sultan's public audience chamber. The structure features a roof approximately 5 to 6 metres (16 to 20 ft) high, built with rubble masonry and historically finished with white lime mortar to provide a stark, majestic appearance.

- Western arm of L-shaped Diwan-e-Aam and Hindu Motifs:

This is the longer, north-south running section of the hall. The ceiling contains 18 vaults supported by three rows of 30 red sandstone pillars. These pillars are of immense archaeological significance as they are spolia from 11th and 12th-century temples, likely from the Agroha Mound. The pillars within the prayer hall show clear signs of being temple remnants, featuring brackets and capitals that were originally designed for Hindu shrines. Many pillars retain rich Hindu and Jain iconographic carvings, including the Purnakalasha (overflowing vase of plenty), stylized lotus stalks, and intricate bead-and-reel moldings. On several column bases, one can still discern fragmented floral patterns and geometric friezes that were partially chiseled away to conform to Islamic aniconism, yet the characteristic square bases and octagonal shafts of traditional Hindu temple architecture of Gurjara-Pratihara or Chauhan Rajput eara remain clearly visible. The eastern row consists of ten double-pillars that form seven distinct gateways opening into the courtyard. The western (back) wall contains engaged pillars and three tiers of recessed red sandstone niches, used historically for lamps or administrative scrolls.

- Northern arm of L-shaped Diwan-e-Aam:

This shorter, north-facing arm consists of three vaulted chambers. It opens southward toward the central courtyard, facing the Ashokan Pillar and the ablution tank.

- Takht-i-shahi inside L-shaped Diwan-e-Aam and the Mystery of the Water Tank:

In the northwest corner of L-shaped Diwan-e-Aam, a raised stone platform called the Takht-i-shahi (Imperial Throne) sits atop four smaller pillars. Accessible by five sandstone steps, it features a carved mihrab indicating the qibla. A significant archaeological mystery lies in the dried-up well or water tank located directly beneath this throne platform. Local historical tradition and architectural analysis suggest this was not a simple well, but a sophisticated passive cooling chamber or "Sardab" designed to circulate water beneath the Sultan's seat to provide natural air conditioning during the blistering Hisar summers. Archaeological speculation also suggests it may have served as a secure repository for state documents or a secret emergency exit leading to the deeper subterranean passages of the citadel to the north of Diwan-i-Aam, potentially connecting to the palace's tehkhana network through a now-collapsed tunnel.

- Underground passage inside the south-end of Diwan-e-Aam:

Within the southern end of the longer western arm of the L-shaped Diwan-e-Aam lies a narrow underground passage. This corridor provided a discrete path for the Sultan or high-ranking clergy to move from the Diwan directly to the Wudu Hammam for ritual purification without being impeded by the public assembly in the courtyard.

==== Lat-ki-Masjid - the small square-shaped royal mosque ====
Lat ki Masjid
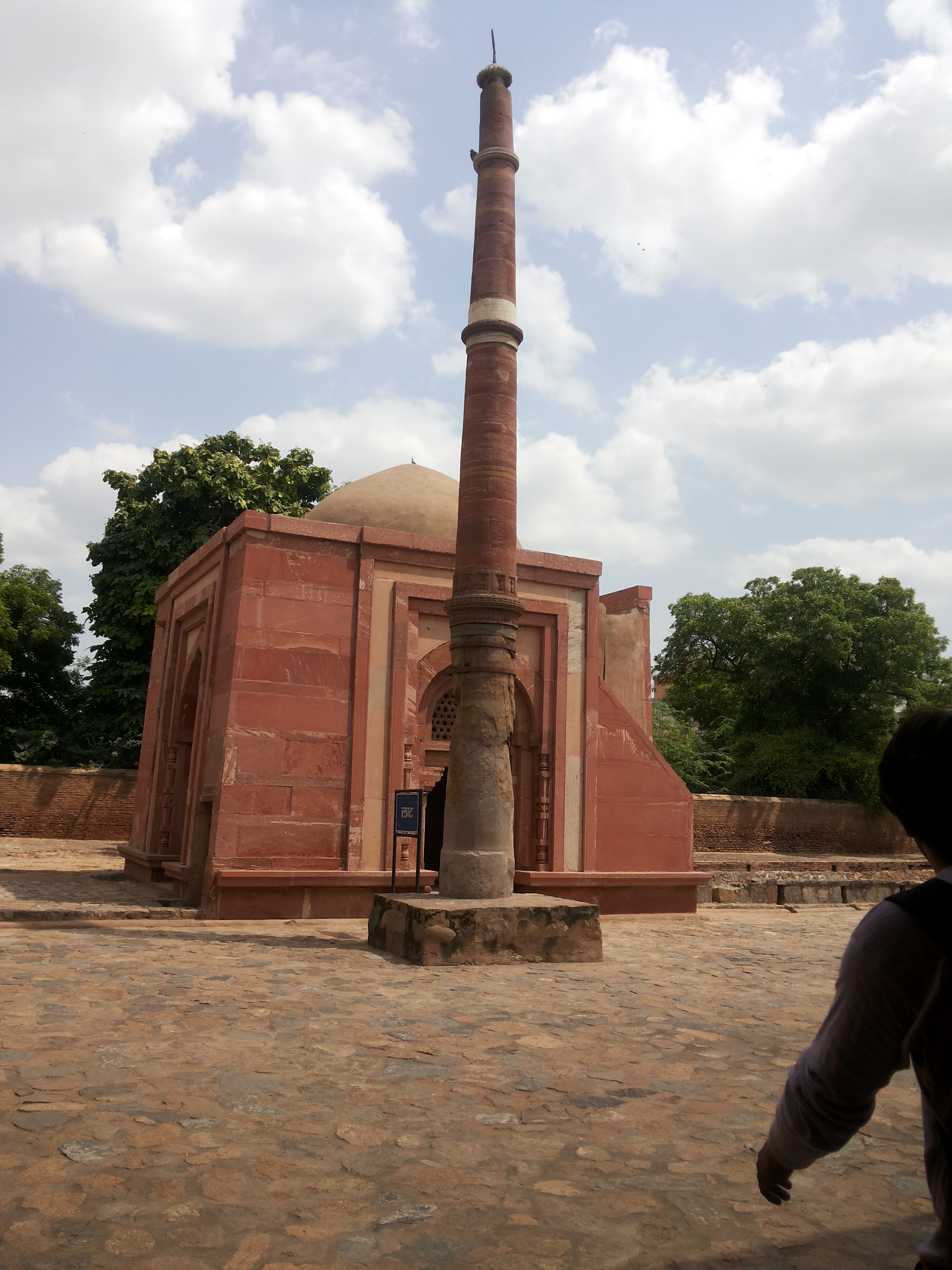

Religion
- Affiliation: Islam
- Ownership: Archaeological Survey of India

Location
- Location: Hisar, Haryana, India
- Interactive map of Lat ki Masjid

Architecture
- Type: Mosque
- Established: 1354

Specifications
- Minaret height: 20 feet
- Materials: Red sandstone

Located at the northeast corner of the courtyard, the Lat ki Masjid is a compact, square, one-story mosque built predominantly of red sandstone from the spolia of Hindu and Jain temples. The architecture of the mosque is a remarkable example of early Tughlaq style fused with indigenous elements. A defining feature is the tapered exterior walls. The mosque also incorporates Hindu architectural techniques, specifically in its trabeate construction and the use of heavy stone lintels rather than true arches for the interior support. The exterior is characterized by stone brackets and jali (latticed) screens above the doors in all four directions, which provide ventilation and filtered light to the interior prayer space.

- Exterior Staircase: An integrated stone staircase on the southwest corner of the building provides access to the roof for the muezzin to make adhan - the Islamic call to prayer.
- Underground staircase: A narrow, subterranean staircase is located in the northwest corner of the mosque. This passage descends and runs southward under the mosque, emerging at the northern end of the L-shaped ablution tank (Hammam), near the junction of the L-shape tank and southwest corner of the mosque.

==== Wudu hammam - the ablution water tank ====
To the south of the Ashokan Pillar lies the L-shaped Wudu Hammam. This masonry tank was used for ritual purification. Its design includes deep steps leading into the water and is fed by an underground conduit connected to the main palace canal system, specifically the Rajabwah Canal, ensuring a constant supply of fresh water for worshippers even in the dry season. The tank's L-shape is strategically aligned to serve both the main Liwan and the smaller royal mosque, acting as a central reservoir for the entire religious complex.

==== Hisar Ashokan pillar (3rd century BCE) ====
The mosque got its name from Lat, a column located in the northeast part of its courtyard. The Lat was once part of an Ashokan pillar, one of the rock-cut edicts of Ashoka dating to 250–232 BCE. This has been proven by the inscriptions in Brahmi script on the pillar, deciphered in 1837 by James Prinsep, an archaeologist, philologist, and official of the East India Company. The Ashokan pillar, likely taken from its nearby original location at the Agroha Mound, was cut for ease of transportation. Four of the pieces were rejoined here, and the remaining bottom portions are at the Fatehabad mosque. The four upper portions of the Ashokan pillar here are tapering registers with a finial topped by an iron rod.

On the Ashokan pillar, fragmented Brahmi characters have been identified, most of the original Ashokan text is no longer legible or present. Like other Ashokan pillars, it was likely intended to spread the message of Dhamma (righteousness), which usually included themes of non-violence, religious tolerance, and social welfare, but these were systematically chiselled off in the 14th century to make room for new text of Firoz Shah Tughlaq. The lower portion contains a long inscription in Tughra Arabic characters that records the genealogy of Sultan Firoz Shah.

Afif mentions that the Sultan was so proud of Ashokan pillars that he considered them more valuable than the gold in his treasury, viewing them as symbols of a "lost race of giants" who once ruled India. Afif notes that the Sultan was fascinated by the "unknown script" (Brahmi script) on the pillars. He invited many scholars to read it, but at that time, nobody in India could decipher it. They told the Sultan it was a "secret code" or a "talisman" left by the ancients. While the Ashokan edicts were largely smoothed over or lost during the move, today, the pillar at the upper part has later inscriptions, there are carvings in Sanskrit and names of pilgrims from the 12th century Chauhan dynasty era (Prithviraj Chauhan), proving the pillar was a famous landmark long before Firoz Shah found it. The Sultan also had his own family tree and details of his victories carved into the red sandstone portion he added.

== Other structures within the historic fort's ramparts ==
Rampart is now gone, but the following structures were outside of the main palace of FIroz Shah but within the rampart of the fort.

=== British Colonial bangalow (19th century CE) ===
A large British Raj era historic building in the complex, to the northeast, was used as a residence for the superintendent of the Government Livestock Farm, Hisar (c. 1809), when entire area around it was transformed into the Government Livestock Farm. The British-era bungalow was constructed on this specific raised ground to give the administrators a panoramic view of the farm’s vast grazing lands and the historical ruins. The current objective is to renovate and repurpose these colonial buildings into Heritage Interpretation Centers or guest houses for visiting scholars. This avoids the decay of the bungalow while utilizing its elevated position to offer a "curated walkway" experience that connects the medieval fort to its later history.

=== Eastern ground ===
Eastern ground, the ground south of British Bangalow and east of Citadel, has seen various uses.

- Imperial Saray and Caravan Assembly:

In the 14th century, this elevated area served as a massive Saray (Rest House) and staging ground for caravans traveling the Delhi-Multan trade route. Its elevation was intentional, created from the debris of earlier settlements to provide a dry, defensible plateau. It functioned as an "outer court" where merchants, travelers, and auxiliary military units could camp before being granted entry through the fort's eastern gates or moving toward the Nagori Gate to the south.

- British Military Parade Ground:

Because the ground south of British Bangalow and east of Citadel was level and elevated, it was frequently used as a parade ground and assembly point for the British garrison stationed in Hisar during the 19th century, particularly during the administrative reorganization of the Hissar District.

== Satellite structures outside fort's rampart ==
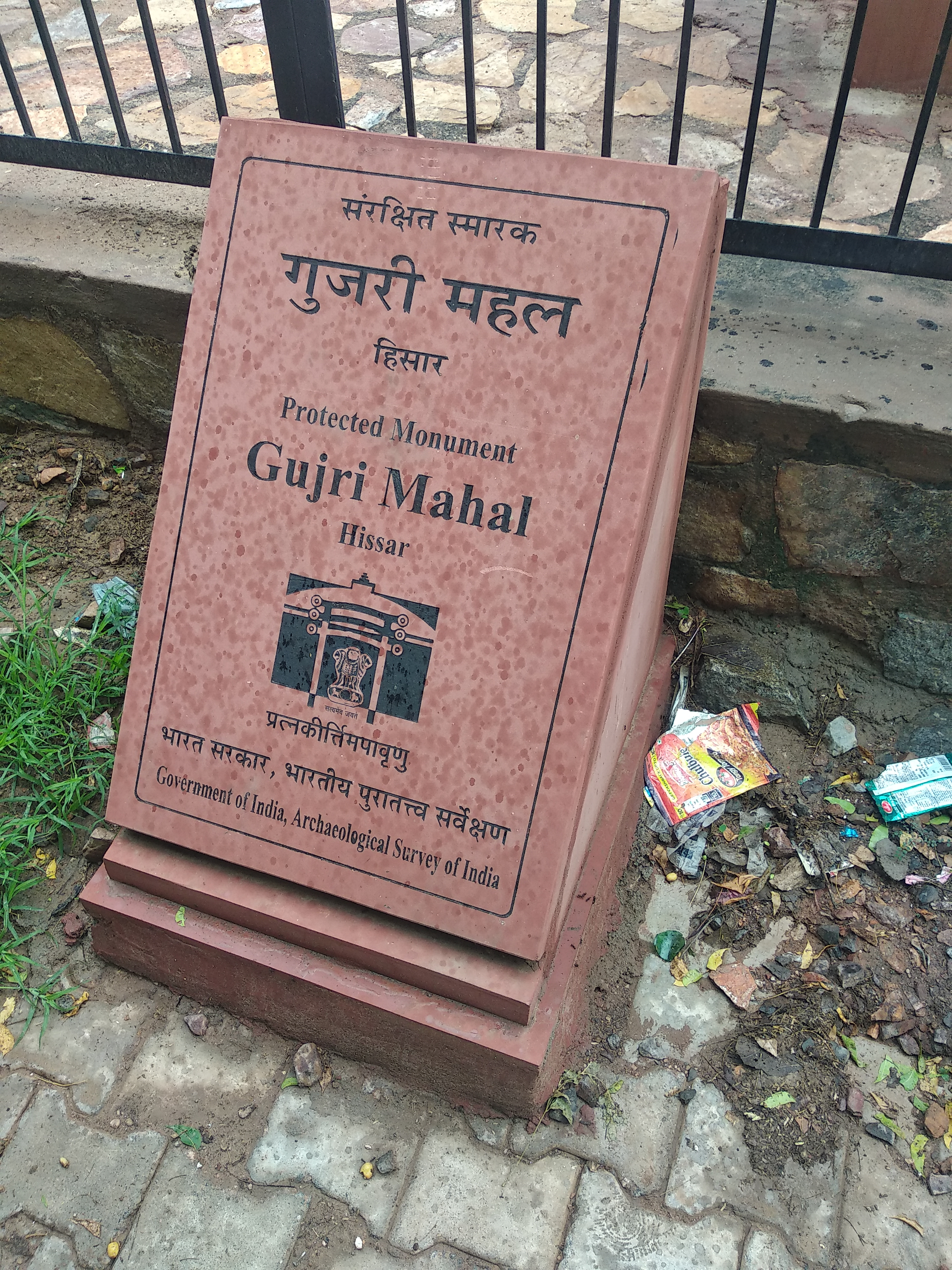
Gujri Mahal at Hisar, north of O.P. Jindal Park and east of Civil Hospital.

=== Gujari Mahal (14th century CE) ===
Gurjari Mahal
- गुर्जरी महल
- Interactive map of Gurjari Mahal
- Location: Hisar, Haryana, India
- Material: Rubble and Mortar
- Beginning date: 1354
- Completion date: 1356
- Dedicated to: Gurjari (Mistress of Firoz Shah Tughlaq)
- The palace is a part of Firoz Shah Palace Complex

The Gujari Mahal was located outside the fort's main ramparts. While the citadel (Hisar-i-Firuza) housed the royal residences, administrative offices, and the garrison, the separate palace for the queen was constructed as an external monument to the southeast of the main fortifications. Unlike the military-focused citadel within the fort ramparts, this "Palace of the Milkmaid" was designed as a pleasure pavilion and residence for his queen, featuring a high masonry platform and an array of residential and ritual structures. This architectural separation allowed the palace to be surrounded by its own extensive gardens and water features, distinct from the military atmosphere of the inner fort. Gurjari Mahal is the name of the palace built by Firoz Shah Tughlaq for his queen Gurjari. The palac, located outside the fort complex to the north of the Firoz Shah Place citadel [and north of present-day O.P. Jindal Park and southeast of Civil Hospital], was built as an outlying structure.

==== Gujri - the queen ====
Gurjari, the mistress of Firuz Shah Tughlaq, was a local resident girl of Hisar who belonged to the Gurjar tribe.

One day when Tughlaq was on a hunting expedition he suddenly felt parched. As he was unable to find water nearby, he began to faint. Fortunately, a Gurjari who was a milkmaid and used to sell milk happened to pass by and offered him milk, reviving the sultan. After this, he started visiting this place often. Whenever the sultan went for hunting, he would visit the Gurjar colony. Soon, Emperor Firoz Shah Tughlaq and Gujari became good friends. Grateful and captivated by her beauty, Firoz Shah Tughlaq proposed marriage to her. The Gurjari accepted his proposal but declined to accompany him to Delhi as she thought she may not be treated well by sultan's other queens. Determined to be with his beloved, Firoz Shah Tughlaq shifted his royal seat to Hisar in Haryana and built the majestic Gurjari Mahal in her honor and built his own palace complex around it. Later, Gurjari became the most favourite wife of Firoz Shah Tughlaq and they had 2 sons and 1 daughter.

==== Architecture ====
The architectural style is notable for its simplicity and the use of repurposed stone—specifically pillars and lintels salvaged from older Jain and Hindu temples from the nearby Agroha Mound and Isukara settlement—which are identifiable by the faint decorative carvings and bracket designs that pre-date the Sultanate era. The palace was built using rubble and mortar. Only a small portion of the Gurjari Mahal palace's main building remains. The palace is built on a rectangular platform and can be approached using a ramp that leads to the upper level. The building has been declared a Centrally Protected Monument by the Archaeological Survey of India. To the north, there were once gardens, but they no longer exist, and modern houses have taken their place. The palace is closed to the public.

==== Baradari ====
The most visible part of what still remains of the palace is the baradari on the upper level, so named for the twelve doorways, three on each side. It was used for social gatherings. Four pillars inside the chamber support the roof. The Baradari, a square structure situated atop a massive rectangular platform. Its name, derived from the Persian words bara (twelve) and dari (doors), refers to the three arched openings on each of its four sides. The interior chamber is supported by four massive square pillars made of local stone, which bear the weight of the flat-roofed ceiling.

===== Gujari hammam - underground bath =====
Three underground apartments are located below the platform. One of them is a tank and is believed to have served as a hammam. Directly beneath the main platform of the Baradari lie three underground apartments designed for privacy and respite from the regional heat. One of these chambers functions as a deep stone-lined tank and is widely identified as a hammam (royal bath). This subterranean complex was historically supplied with fresh water via the Sultan's elaborate canal system, ensuring that the queen had access to river water as requested in oral traditions. The chambers are interconnected and were likely ventilated through small shafts to maintain a cool, humid environment during the summer months.

===== Mughal graves (17th-18th century CE) =====
On the upper level are a total of nine graves, all of which date back to the 17th or 18th century Mughal Empire era, five are sarcophagi on an open-air platform nearly three feet higher, two are sarcophagi on a separate nearby open-air lower platform (less than 1 foot (0.30 metres) from the bottom), the last two are brick shrines inside a brick structure that no longer has a roof These graves were constructed long after the original Tughlaq residence was abandoned as a palace.

- Graves
  - On the main platform: Five elevated sarcophagi are situated on an open-air platform approximately three feet high.
  - On the lower platform: Two additional sarcophagi rest on a secondary, lower platform nearby.
  - Brick shrines on main platform: The final two graves are housed within a roofless brick structure, identified as brick shrines.

These burials likely belong to local Sufi saints or high-ranking Mughal officers who utilized the site as a sacred space or burial ground after the strategic shift of the regional capital.

==== Secondary apartment for servants ====
In the corner of the upper platform stands a small secondary apartment. Unlike the open and social design of the Baradari, this structure is more enclosed and is believed to have served as a private retiring room or a security post for the attendants of the queen. It demonstrates the typical Tughlaq "batter" or inward-sloping walls, providing structural longevity that has allowed it to remain standing while other peripheral parts of the palace have collapsed.

=== Charbagh garden ===
The Charbagh garden constructed by Firoz Shah Tughlaq, located where the present-day O.P. Jindal Park stands, was designed in the Pre-Islamic Achaemenian Persian paradise garden style. Situated outside the main citadel ramparts, it occupied the strategic depression north of the royal palace complex and south of the Gujari Mahal, serving as a lush, landscaped link between the Sultan's fortified residence and his queen's palace. Firoz Shah Tughlaq, known for his obsession with horticulture, reportedly planted over 1,200 gardens around Delhi and his new cities. In Hisar, he established a grand garden between the main fort and the Gujari Mahal, designed in the traditional Persian style with symmetric water channels and fruit-bearing trees. This park was not merely for leisure; it was a feat of engineering that utilized the newly constructed canals to transform a barren, arid wasteland into a productive oasis. Chroniclers like Shams-i-Siraj Afif noted that these gardens produced a variety of fruits, including grapes and melons, which significantly added to the state's revenue. The garden served as a private retreat for the royal couple, featuring pavilions and shaded walkways that connected the Sultan's palace to the Gujari Mahal. The central feature of this garden was its sophisticated irrigation system, where water from the Rajabwah canal was lifted into raised masonry channels to flow by gravity through the garden's quadrants.

- Design and hydraulic engineering:

The garden's design followed a strict quadrilateral layout, divided by walkways and flowing water channels into four smaller sectors. This symmetry was maintained through a sophisticated hydraulic system that bypassed the natural aridity of the Haryana desert. Water was sourced from the Yamuna River and transported via the Rajabwah Canal (also known as the Firoz Shah Canal), which entered the city vicinity through the eastern Mori Gate ["mori" itself means the "sluice"]. At the Mori Gate, the smaller gate named for the conduit (mori) that allowed water to pass through the fortifications, the water was diverted into masonry aqueducts. These channels were elevated to ensure gravity-fed irrigation throughout the garden's quadrants. Small tanks and cooling fountains were integrated at the intersections of the paths, creating a micro-climate that allowed for the cultivation of flora typically found in more temperate Persian regions.

- Horticulture and production:

Firoz Shah, a dedicated horticulturist who reportedly established over 1,200 gardens across the Sultanate, intended the Hisar garden to be both a private retreat and an economic asset. The revenue generated from the sale of these fruits reportedly contributed nearly 180,000 tankas annually to the state treasury, proving that the garden was a successful "productive oasis" and a masterpiece of 14th-century agrarian engineering. According to the contemporary chronicler Shams-i-Siraj Afif, the Sultan introduced high-quality varieties of fruits that were previously rare in the region:

Sugarcane Varieties: The garden was famous for producing two distinct types of sugarcane: a soft variety preferred for direct consumption and juice extraction, and a hard variety used for large-scale sugar processing and jaggery production.

Grapes: Several varieties, including the Sahibi and Habshi grapes, were cultivated in vast vineyards.

Melons: Sweet melons and watermelons were grown in the sandy loams enriched by canal silt.

Orchards: The garden also featured pomegranate, orange, and fig trees.

- Present status:

Today, the historic parkland has been partially preserved as the O.P. Jindal Park, though much of the original Tughlaq-era masonry and water channels were lost during subsequent centuries of redevelopment. The open spaces surrounding the Gujari Mahal and the protected grounds managed by the Archaeological Survey of India (ASI) remain the only visible remnants of the once-contiguous royal horticultural landscape.

== Jahaj Kothi Museum (18th century structure on 11th-12th century CE temple site) ==
Jahaj Kothi Museum, located on southwest corner of GJUST 2 km east of Firoz Shah Palace Complex, is a later era building that was originally a Jain temple which was later used as residence by George Thomas, which is currently maintained by Archaeological Survey of India.

Nearby Haryana Rural Antique Museum is in Gandhi Bhawan, and exhibits the evolution of agriculture and vanishing antiques. The Rakhigarhi Indus Valley Civilisation Museum is located in Rakhigarhi, which is an Indus Valley Civilisation site 60 km (37 mi) away, and is established by the state government.

== See also ==
- Asigarh Fort
- Pranpir Badshah tomb
- Tughlakabad
