= Haryana State Directorate of Archaeology & Museums =

Indian government department

Government of Haryana Haryana State Directorate of Archaeology & Museums

Agency overview
- Jurisdiction: Government of Haryana
- Headquarters: Haryana Civil Secretariat, Sector-1, Chandigarh; 30°45′40″N 76°48′2″E
- Minister responsible: Ram Bilas Sharma
- Website: http://archaeologyharyana.nic.in

Haryana State Directorate of Archaeology & Museums is a ministry and department of the Government of Haryana in India.

== Description ==
This department came into existence in 1972 after Haryana was established as a new state in 1966 within India after being separated from Punjab. This was established as a cell under the education department in 1969, which was upgraded to a separate department in 1972. It published archaeology and excavation reports, maintains notified archaeology sites and three museums.

Dr. Banani Bhattacharyya is the deputy director since November 2015.

== Museums ==
Museums maintained by this department are

- Jahaj Kothi Museum at Firoz Shah Palace Complex in Hisar is a zonal museum.
- Panchkula State Museum at Sector-5 Panchkula is an upcoming state museum.
- Panipat Museum near Western Yamuna Canal at Binjhol village 5 km from Panipat
- Pinjore Garden Site Museum at Pinjore Gardens in Pinjore is a site museum.
- Shrikrishna Museum at Kurukshetra is a state museum.
- Thanesar Archaeological Site Museum inside Sheikh Chilli's Tomb at Thanesar in Kurukshetra
- Guru Gobind Singh Martial Art Museum at Yamunanagar.
- Jayanti Devi Archaeological Museum at Jind.

== See also ==
- List of Museums in Haryana
- Gurukul Jhajjar Museum
- International Dolls Museum at Chandigarh
- State Protected Monuments in Haryana
- List of Monuments of National Importance in Haryana
- List of Indus Valley Civilization sites in Haryana, Punjab, Rajasthan, Gujarat, India & Pakistan
- National Parks & Wildlife Sanctuaries of Haryana
- List of Indian states and territories by highest point
- Lists of Indian Monuments of National Importance
- Archaeological Survey of India
- Haryana Tourism
- Haryana Waqf Board
