= Dharohar Museum =

- Location within Haryana
- Location: Kurukshetra University campus, Kurukshetra, Haryana, India
- Coordinates: 29.9657°N 76.8370°E
- Type: Museum
- Public transit access: Kurukshetra bus stand
- Website: Dharohar Museum

The Dharohar Museum is located on the Kurukshetra University campus, Kurukshetra, Haryana, India.

== History ==
The Dharohar Museum was set up in Kurukshetra University's golden jubilee year to exhibit archeological, cultural and architectural history and heritage of Haryana.

== Sections and exhibits ==
The museum has 23 sections and galleries showcasing different aspects of Harynavi culture:

1. The Kurukshetra University: A Glimpse of History
2. War-Heroes
3. Freedom Fighters
4. Architectural Heritage of Haryana
5. Archaeological Heritage of Haryana
6. Folk Musical Instruments of Haryana
7. Wall Paintings
8. Manuscripts
9. Gher (Cattle Shed)
10. Agriculture & Folk Festivals
11. Water Heritage of Haryana
12. Hukka
13. Chaarpais (Cots)
14. Domestic Articles of Haryana
15. Art and Craft of Haryana
16. Transportations of Haryana
17. Professional artifacts/tools of Haryana
18. Haryanvi Ornaments
19. Haryanavi Rasois
20. Folk Costumes of Haryana
21. Theatre Chamber
22. Library and Research
23. Raj Kishan Nain Photo Gallery

== Open-air theatre ==
There is open-air theatre for Haryanavi folk art, music and dance performances.

== Gallery ==
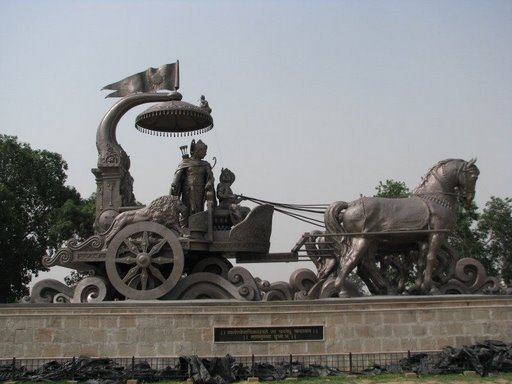
Hitopadesha

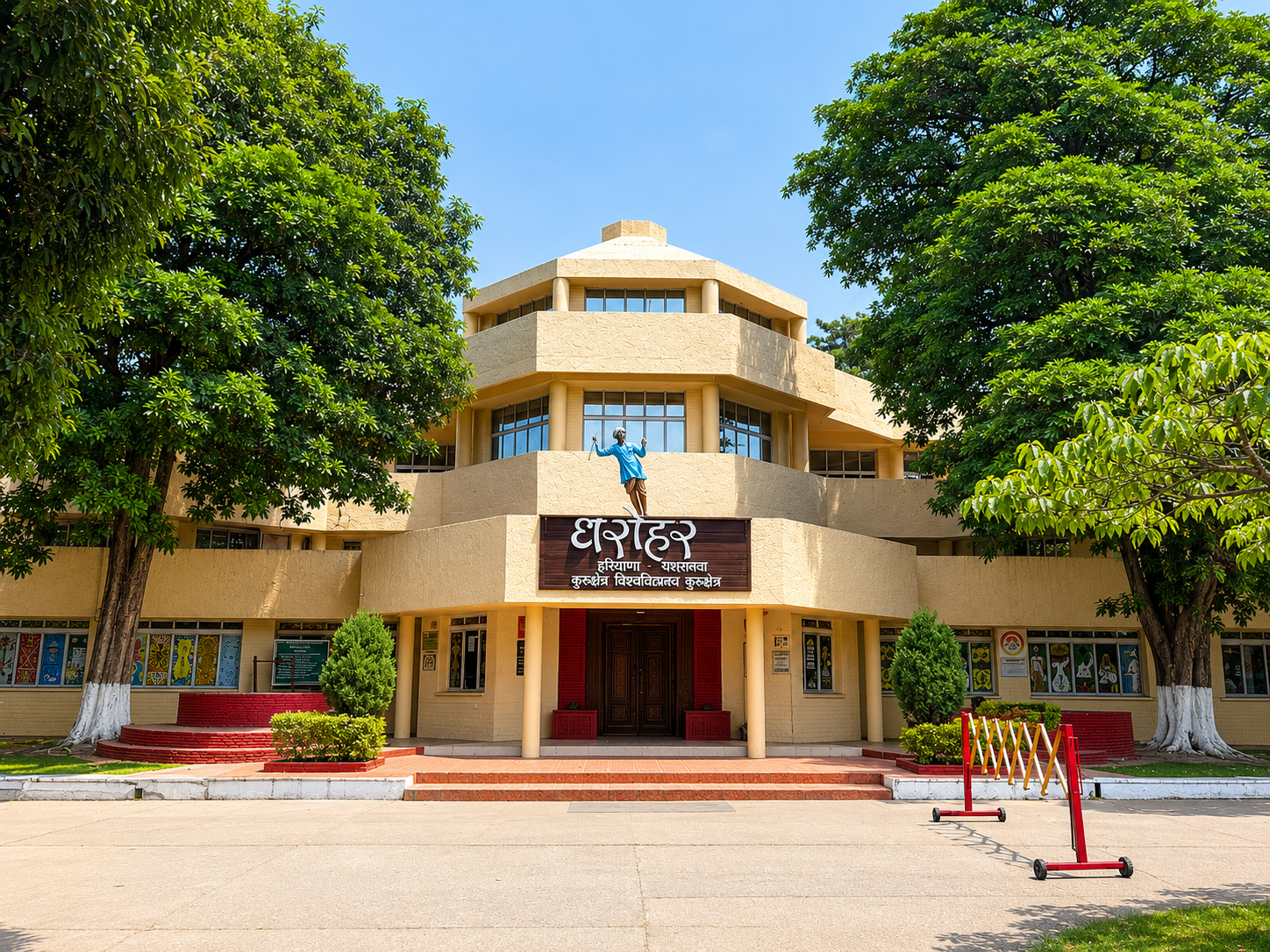
Entry gate of Dharohar

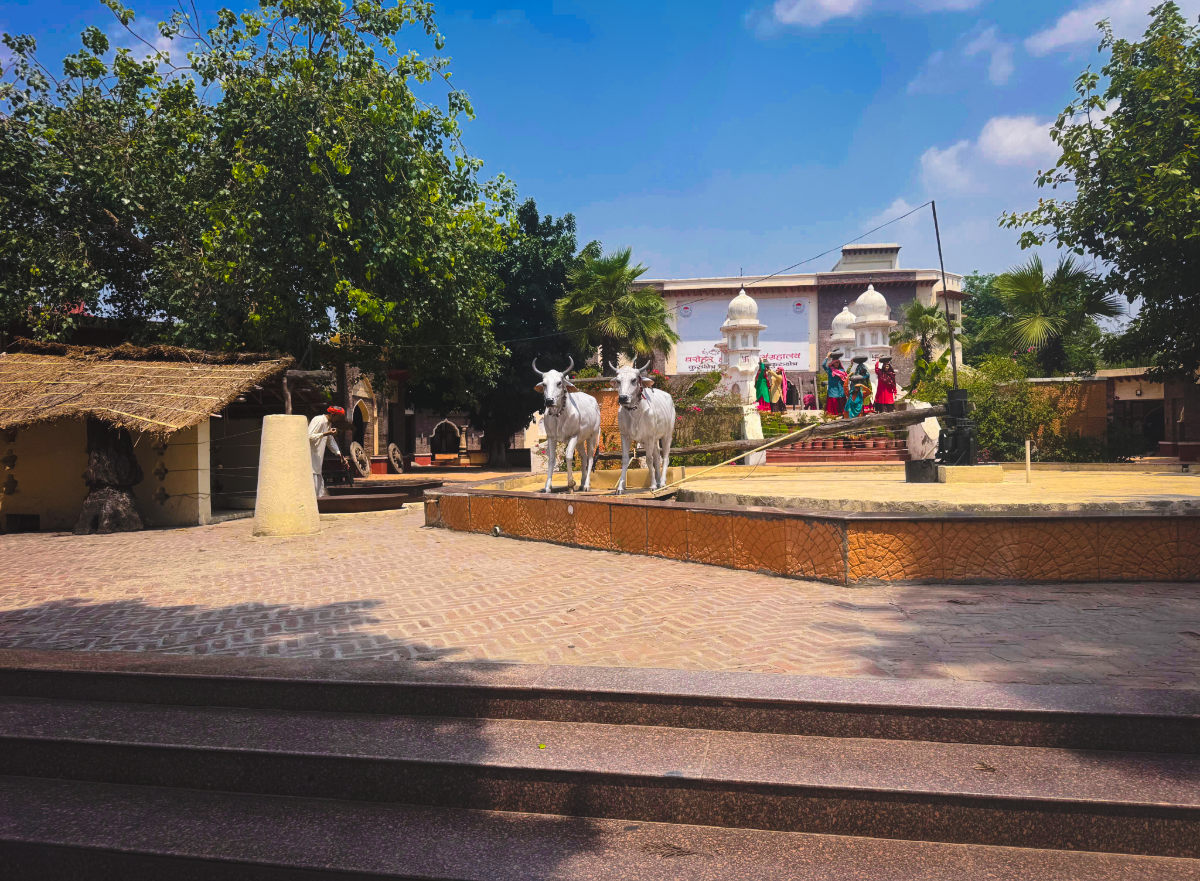
A vibrant rural heritage courtyard inside Dharohar, showcasing traditional village life, culture, and architecture.

== See also ==
- List of Museums in Haryana
- Haryana State Museum at Panchkula
- Haryana Rural Antique Museum at HAU Hisar
- Jahaj Kothi Museum at Hisar fort
- Rakhigarhi Indus Valley Civilisation Museum near Hisar
- Sheikhpura Kothi near Hansi
- Kurukshetra Panorama and Science Centre at Kurukshetra
- Shrikrishna Museum at Kurukshetra
- Sheikh Chilli's Tomb at Kurukshetra
- Rewari Railway Heritage Museum at Rewari railway station
