= Kurukshetra Panorama and Science Centre =

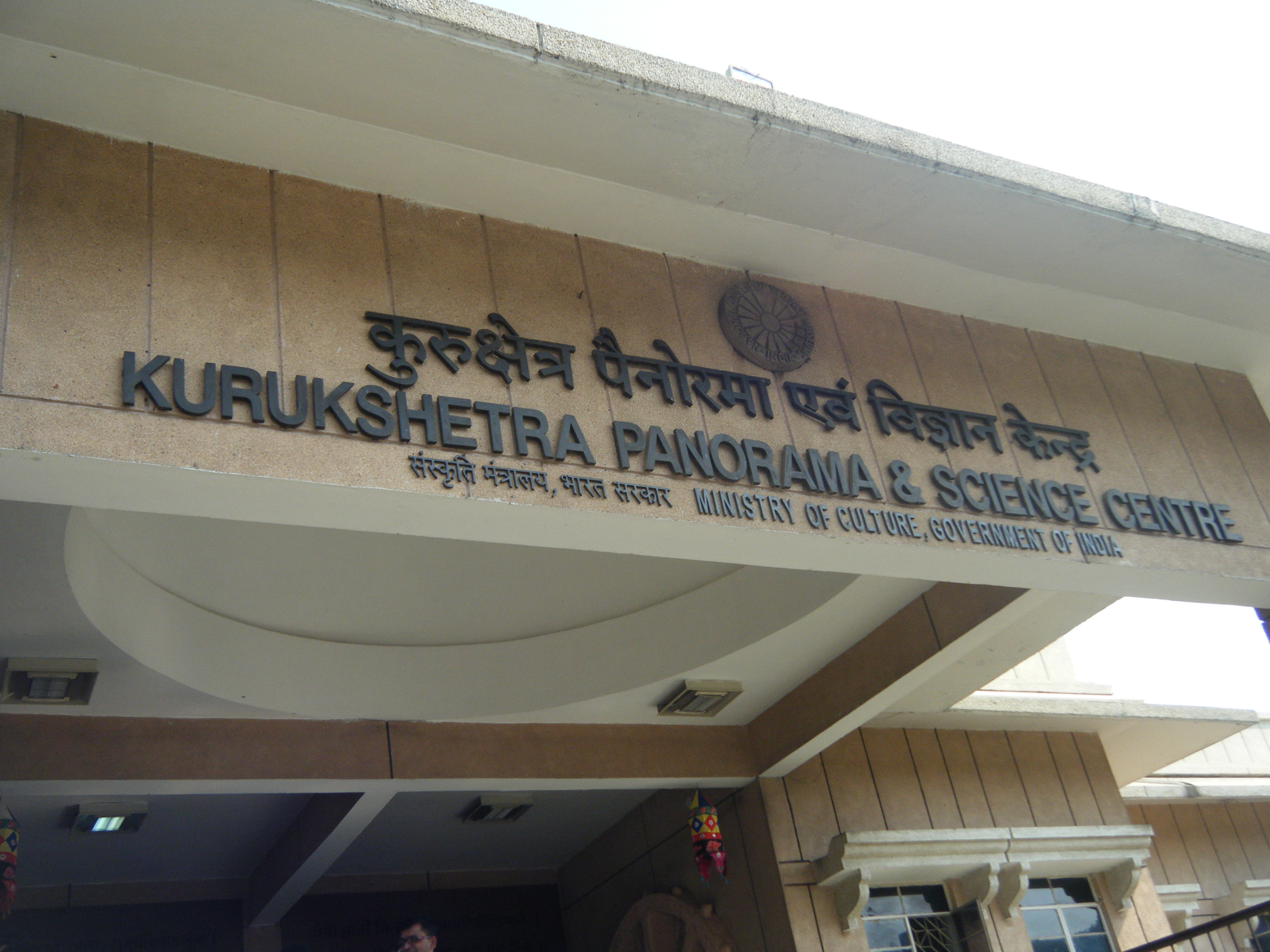

- Location within Haryana
- Established: 2001
- Location: Thanesar, Kurukshetra, Haryana, India
- Coordinates: 29.9660°N 76.8341°E
- Type: Museum
- Public transit access: Kurukshetra bus stand
- Website: Kurukshetra Panorama and Science Centre

The Kurukshetra Panorama and Science Centre is located next to Shrikrishna Museum in Thanesar, Kurukshetra, Haryana, India about 1.5 km from Kurukshetra railway station.

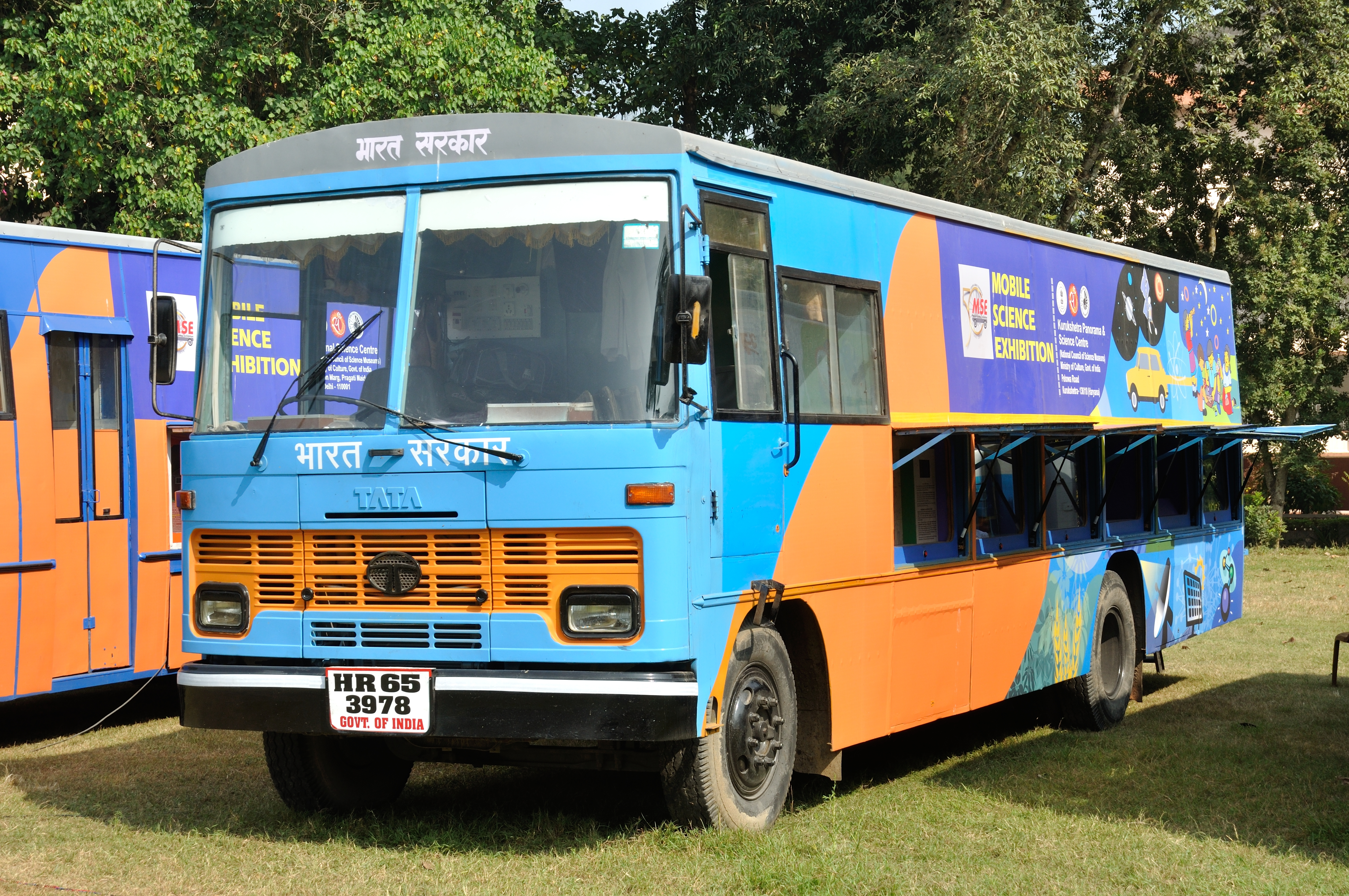
Kurukshetra Panorama and Science Centre display bus

== Exhibits ==
This is a two-story building with several exhibits, which has been visited by 80 million visitors in 15 years till March 2016.

1. India-A Heritage in Science, Technology and Culture
2. lifelike Panorama of the epic battle of Kurukshetra
3. Science Park

== See also ==
- List of Museums in Haryana
- Haryana State Museum at Panchkula
- Haryana Rural Antique Museum at HAU Hisar
- Jahaj Kothi Museum at Hisar fort
- Rakhigarhi Indus Valley Civilisation Museum near Hisar
- Sheikhpura Kothi near Hansi
- Dharohar Museum at Kurukshetra University
- Shrikrishna Museum at Kurukshetra
- Sheikh Chilli's Tomb at Kurukshetra
- Rewari Railway Heritage Museum at Rewari railway station
