= Vasant Shinde =

Vasant Shinde may refer to:

- Vasant Shinde (actor) (1912–1999), Indian actor
- Vasant Shinde (archaeologist), Indian archaeologist
