= Haryana Rural Antique Museum =

Museum in Haryana, India

Dr. Mangal Sein Science Museum
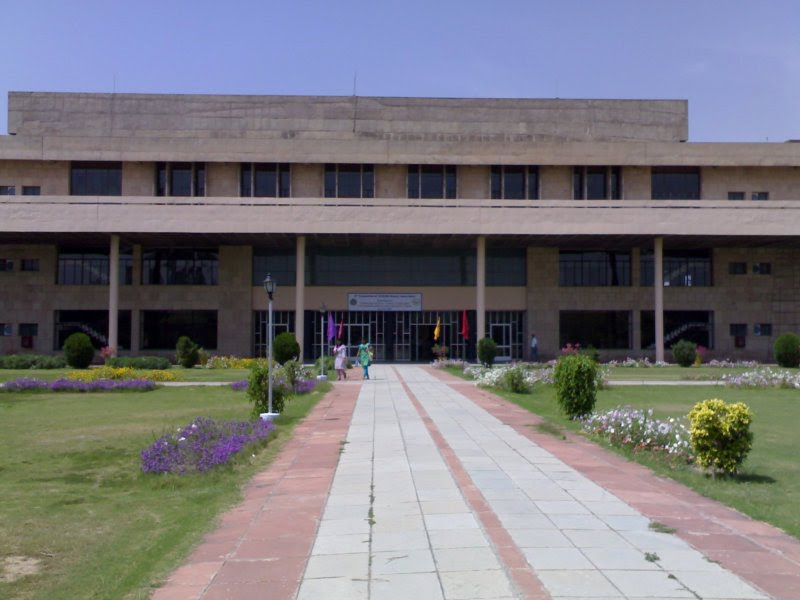

- Location within Haryana Location within India
- Former name: Haryana Rural Antique Museum
- Established: 1978
- Location: Gandhi Bhawan Building, Chaudhary Charan Singh Haryana Agricultural University, Hisar, Haryana, India
- Coordinates: 29°09′N 75°42′E
- Type: Science & history museum
- Key holdings: Soil Samples, Crop Varieties, Electron Microscope, Tractor, Bullock Cart, Rural Antiques, etc.
- Collection size: ~1000
- Director: Dr. Krishan Yadav
- Owners: CCS HAU, Government of Haryana
- Public transit access: Hisar bus stand, Hisar Airport, Hisar Junction railway station
- Parking: Gandhi Bhawan Parking (no charge)
- Website: www.hau.ac.in

The Dr. Mangal Sain Museum (earlier, Haryana Rural Antique Museum) in Hisar, Haryana, India is located inside the Gandhi Bhawan building of Chaudhary Charan Singh Haryana Agricultural University.

== History ==
The museum construction started in 1975 and was completed around 1978, to preserve the vanishing antiques of rural Haryana. The museum was extended with additional space in 2010.

=== Reconstruction ===
The reconstruction of the museum started in 2018 and was projected to finish by 2019 but completed in 2021. The museum now have a scale model of central complex of CCS HAU, a Mixed reality studio, different soil samples from Haryana, digital platform showcasing pioneering projects of HAU, traditional and folklores of Haryana, a library, and a lot more.

The museum was inaugurated and opened for public by Governor of Haryana & Chancellor of CCS HAU Hon. Sh. Bandaru Dattatreya along with Chief Minister Sh. Manohar Lal Khattar in March 2022.

== Departments and collections ==
The museum houses the collection of antiquities showcasing development of agriculture and rural society in Haryana. The collection includes dresses, agricultural and farm tools and implements, rural tools and equipment, rural music instruments, Haryanvi folk dresses for men and women, farm vehicles, etc.

The museum also have a Mixed Reality portal where visitors can see and feel the agricultural and social development of rural Haryana as well as visit CCS HAU campus in virtual world.

== Exhibition hall ==
The Gandhi Bhawan building, that houses the extension education department of the university, also has exhibition hall for hosting exhibitions.

== Gallery ==
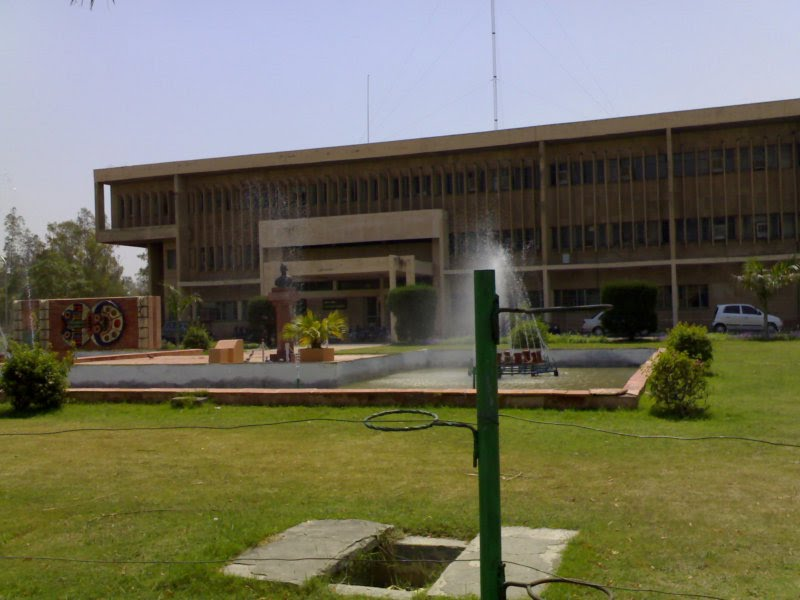
Fletcher Bhawan of CCS HAU lies immediately north of museum.

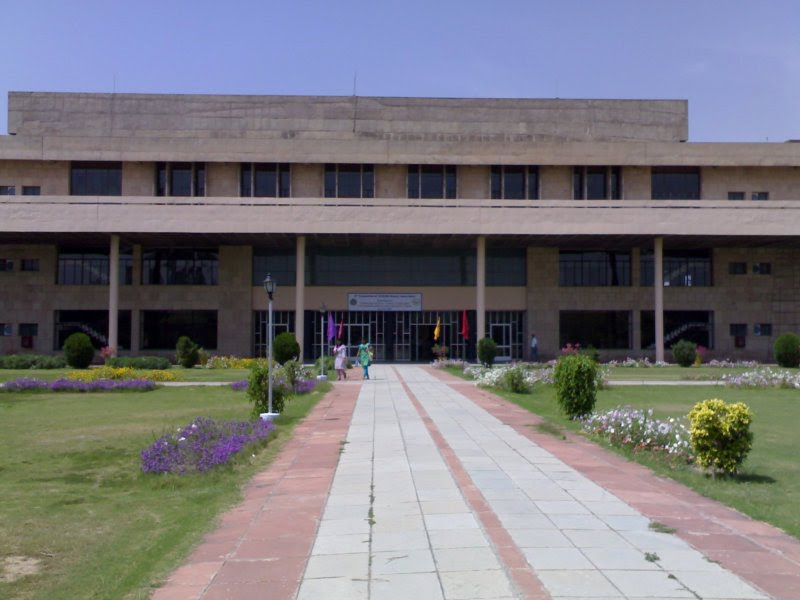
Indira Gandhi Auditorium lies immediately in the south-west corner of museum.

== See also ==
- List of Museums in Haryana
- Pranpir Badshah tomb, Panchyat Bhawan in Hisar Govt College ground
- Jahaj Kothi Museum at Hisar fort
- Rakhigarhi Indus Valley Civilisation Museum near Hisar
- Asigarh Fort
- Sheikhpura Kothi near Hansi
- Dharohar Museum at Kurukshetra University
- Kurukshetra Panorama and Science Centre at Kurukshetra
- Shrikrishna Museum at Kurukshetra
- Rewari Railway Heritage Museum at Rewari railway station
