= Shrikrishna Museum =

Srikrishna Museum
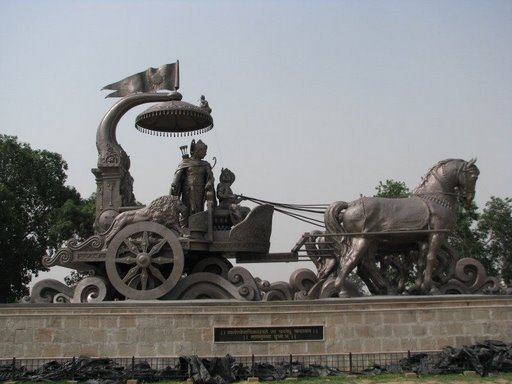

- Location within India Location within Haryana
- Location: Kurukshetra, Haryana, India
- Coordinates: 29.9651°N 76.8340°E
- Type: Museum
- Public transit access: Kurukshetra bus stand
- Website: Kurukshetra

The Srikrishna Museum is located next to Kurukshetra Panorama and Science Centre in Kurukshetra, Haryana, India.

== History ==
In 1987, the Kurukshetra Development Board (KDB) set up the Srikrishna Museum which was relocated to its present site in 1991. Additional, buildings were added in 1995 and third 2012. Plan to add the fourth building was announced in 2025.

== Exhibits ==
The museum has nine galleries in three buildings displaying Hindu avataras, archaeological artefacts, paintings, sculptures recovered during excavation and multimedia gallery. It has a big range of exhibits including ancient sculptures, carvings and paintings, dioramas, giant statues, surreal sounds and a walk-through maze. Fourth building, under construction, will have additional galleries, a gallery related to the Mahabharata era sites, another relate to 48-kos Kurukshetra parikrama, third gallery related to Krishna Bhakti movement.

== Development ==
In 2025, Haryana Government was also developing two more museums in Kurukshetra, Virasat-e-Khalsa Museum and Guru Ravidas Museum.

Virasat-e-Khalsa Museum, Kurukshetra will be developed on the pattern of in Punjab’s Anandpur Sahib Museum at a cost of Rs 115 crore. Splat media has been appointed as the design consultant, which has envisaged the 3-acre campus with museum, an amphitheatre, meditation hall, a light and sound show and a musical fountain, etc. The museum will showcase the origin of Sikhism, the birth and rise of Khalsa forces, Sikh Empire of Maharaja Ranjit Singh, global Sikh diaspora. The foundation stone will be laid and construction will commence in November 2025, and project will be completed by December 2027.

Guru Ravidas Museum, Kurukshetra will be developed on 5-acre.

== See also ==
- List of Museums in Haryana
- Haryana State Museum at Panchkula
- Haryana Rural Antique Museum at HAU Hisar
- Jahaj Kothi Museum at Hisar fort
- Rakhigarhi Indus Valley Civilisation Museum near Hisar
- Sheikhpura Kothi near Hansi
- Dharohar Museum at Kurukshetra University
- Kurukshetra Panorama and Science Centre at Kurukshetra
- Sheikh Chilli's Tomb at Kurukshetra
- Rewari Railway Heritage Museum at Rewari railway station
