= Vasant Shinde (archaeologist) =

Indian archaeologist

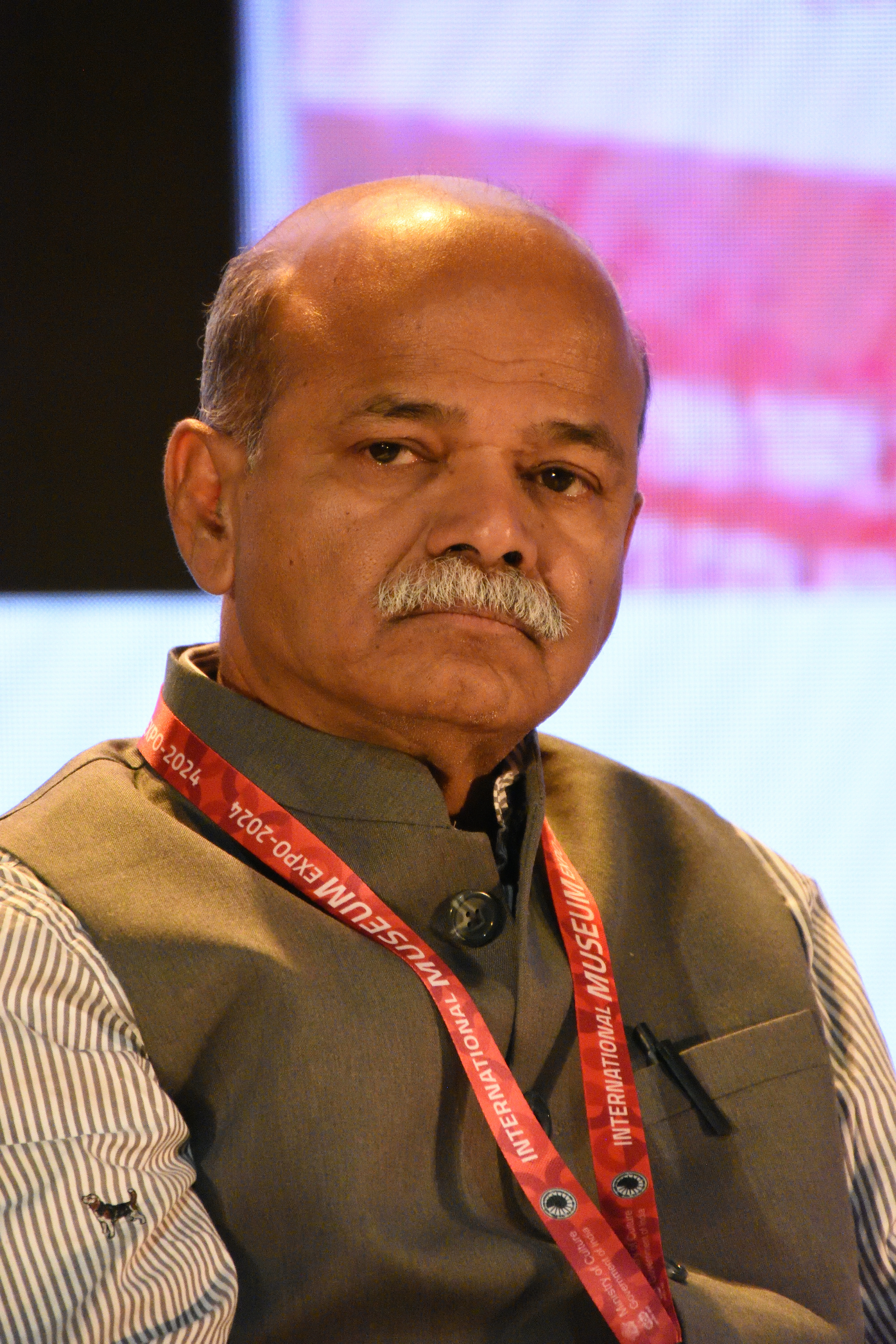
Vasant Shinde - Kolkata in 2024

Vasant Shinde is an Indian archaeologist, who has done excavations at Rakhigarhi from 2011 to 2016. He was the first author on the long-awaited 2019 paper "An Ancient Harappan Genome Lacks Ancestry from Steppe Pastoralists or Iranian Farmers," on DNA-research on a single skeleton from Rakhigarhi which shows that the people of the Indus Valley Civilisation had no steppe (Indo-Aryan) genetic ancestry, in line with the Indo-Aryan migration theory. (Note: C.P. Rajendran (2019), Scientists Part of Studies Supporting Aryan Migration Endorse Party Line Instead, The Wire, 13 september 2019) The day after the publication Shinde publicly endorsed the Out of India theory, contradicting the conclusions of this paper. (Note: Siddhartha Mishra (2019), The Press Conference On Rakhigarhi Findings Throws Up More Questions Than Answers, Outlook India)

== Occupations ==
- Adjunct Professor at the National Institute of Advanced Studies, IIC Campus, Bangalore (Note: Bhishma School of Indian Knowledge System, Prof. Dr. Vasant Shinde)
- Director General, National Maritime Heritage Complex, Gandhinagar
- Director of the Rakhigarhi Research Project (Note: Chandan Nandy (2011), Culture ministry to study 'racial purity' of Indians, The New Indian Express)
- Former Professor and Vice-Chancellor at the Deccan College, Post-Graduate and Research Institute, Deemed University, Pune

== Excavations ==
In the 1980s-1990s Shinde conducted excavations at the Tapti basin in Maharashtra. (Note: Blanton 2006, p. 22: "Special note must be made of the work of Vasant Shinde (1991, 1998)")

From 2011 to 2016 Shinde conducted excavations at the Indus Valley Civilisation site of Rakhigarhi. According to Shinde, Rakhigarhi was larger than Mohenjo-daro, (Note: T.S. Subramanian (March 27, 2014), Rakhigarhi, the biggest Harappan site. Bigger than Mohenjo-daro, claims expert) (Note: Jason Burke (30 Dec 2015), Rakhigarhi: Indian town could unlock mystery of Indus civilisation) and the IVC started in the Ghaggar basin, identified by him with the Vedic Sarasvati River, and from there extended to the Indus River.

== Rakhigarhi DNA ==
=== Research findings ===
According to Avikunthak, Shinde was the first archaeologist who noticed the value of genetic research in the debate on the origins of Indo-Aryan culture in India. Initially working together with Seoul National University College of Medicine, Shinde was the main author on the long-awaited 2019 paper "An Ancient Harappan Genome Lacks Ancestry from Steppe Pastoralists or Iranian Farmers," co-authored by David Reich, and wearing his "unmistakable stamp." The paper concluded that the IVC-people lacked ancestry from Anatolia and the steppes, in line with the Indo-Aryan migration theory, which argues that the Indo-Aryan Vedic people migrated into South Asia after the height of the Indus Valley Civilisation, in the period of ca. 1900-1500 BCE.

Shinde et al. (2019) concluded that the genome of researched individual "fits as a mixture of people related to ancient Iranians (the largest component) and Southeast Asian hunter-gatherers." The Iranian component was unrelated to early Iranian farmers, "contradicting the hypothesis that the shared ancestry between early Iranians and South Asians reflects a large-scale spread of western Iranian farmers east," concluding that farming in India began "without being connected by movement of people."

Shinde et al. (2019) states that the presence of Anatolian farmer-related ancestry in South Asians today "is consistent with [it] being entirely derived from Steppe pastoralists who carried it in mixed form and who spread into South Asia from 2000–1500 BCE (Narasimhan et al. 2019)." The paper further states that "a natural route for Indo-European languages to have spread into South Asia is from Eastern Europe via Central Asia in the first half of the 2nd millennium BCE, a chain of transmission that did occur as has been documented in detail with ancient DNA."

=== Personal views ===
A press note was released by Shinde in September 2019, preceding a press conference at 6 September 2019 on the findings. (Note: Press note) The press note stated that the research

completely sets aside the Aryan Migration/Invasion Theory [...] as hypothesized by Sir Mortimer Wheeler.

It also stated that the research

establishes the fact that the Vedic culture was developed by the indigenous people of South Asia. Our premise that the Harappans were the Vedic people thus has received strong corroborative scientific evidence based on ancient DNA studies.

Several media outlets followed Shinde's primer, and presented the study as a rebuttal of the established Indo-Aryan migration theory, confusing it with Mortimer Wheeler's outdated proposal, and ignoring the actual contents and conclusions of the study. (Note: Girish Shahane (Sept 14, 2019), Why Hindutva supporters love to hate the discredited Aryan Invasion Theory, Scroll India)

At the press conference held at September 6, 2019 to explain the findings, Vasant Shinde and Niraj Rai publicly endorsed the Out of India theory, rejecting the idea that the Vedic people had migrated into South Asia at the time of the decline of the Harappan civilisation. As Shinde stated, "the Vedic era that followed [the IVC] was a fully indigenous period with some external contact."

According to journalist Hartosh Singh Bal, "the claim that the Harappans were the Vedic people "betrays the very research that underlies the two papers. To believe this, the authors would have to discredit their own papers."

During 2020 Shinde further propagated his interpretation of the archaeogenetic data, craniofacial reconstruction of skeletal remains, and material archaeological remains that "the Harappans moved westward - propagating the "Out of India theory"- a return to the Hindutva claim of the Vedic Aryan, now invoking aDNA data as arsenal."

== Project advise ==
In 2022 Shinde advised Ministry of Culture Secretary Govind Mohan on a project to study the genetic history of India's population. (Note: Jacob Koshy (June 10, 2022), Scientists condemn project to study 'racial purity' of Indian population, The Hindu]) Reported by The New Indian Times as a project ""trace the purity of races in India," the project drew criticism and condemnation. (Note: C.P. Rajendran (2 june 20062022), It's About Celebrating Our Genetic Diversity, Not 'Racial Purity') In response, the Ministry of Culture issued a statement "refuting the report and said that it has no intention of conducting studies of racial purity in the country." According to Shinde, his statement was "twisted and fabricated." In an open letter, "[over] a 100 leading biologists, historians, anthropologists and intellectuals" protested against the plan, warning that the term "race" is a social construct with unwarranted implications. (Note: 122 scientists, academics criticise project to reportedly study 'racial purity' of Indians, scroll.in) (Note: Letter to Ministry: Publicly Disavow Plans To Revive Racial Stereotyping in India, The Wire)

== Works ==
- Early Settlements in the Central Tapi Basin
- Chalcolithic South Asia: Aspects of Crafts and Technologies
- Cultural Heritage of South Asia and Beyond Recent Perspective
- Excavations at Gilund: The Artifacts and Other Studies
- 2017. Ancient Indian Knowledge System : Archaeological Perspective
- 2022. Bharatiya Knowledge Systems
- 2023: New Perspectives on the Harappan Culture in Light of Recent Excavations at Rakhigarhi: 2011–2017, Volume 1: Bioarchaeological Research on the Rakhigarhi Necropolis (editor, together with Dong Hoon Shin), Archaeopress Publishing Ltd.

== See also ==
- Rakhigarhi Indus Valley Civilisation Museum
- Indo-European migrations

== Sources ==
Printed sources

- Avikunthak, Ashish (2022). Bureaucratic Archaeology: State, Science, and Past in Postcolonial India. Cambridge University Press.
- Blanton, Richard E. (2006). Settlement, Subsistence, and Social Complexity: Essays Honoring the Legacy of Jeffrey R. Parsons. Cotsen Institute of Archaeology Press.
- Danino, Michel (2010). The Lost River: On the Trail of the Sarasvati. Penguin Books India.
- Joseph, Tony (2019-09-13). "New reports clearly confirm 'Arya' migration into India". The Hindu. ISSN 0971-751X.
- Narasimhan, Vagheesh M.; Patterson, N.J.; Moorjani, Priya; Rohland, Nadin (2019), "The Formation of Human Populations in South and Central Asia", Science, 365 (6457) eaat7487, doi:10.1126/science.aat7487, PMC 6822619, PMID 31488661
- Norrie, Philip Anthony (2023). An Alternative Medical Perspective on Ancient History: The Plague of Sumer. Cambridge Scholars Publishing.
- Shinde, Vasant; Narasimhan, Vagheesh M.; Rohland, Nadin; Mallick, Swapan; Mah, Matthew; Lipson, Mark; Nakatsuka, Nathan; Adamski, Nicole; Broomandkhoshbacht, Nasreen; Ferry, Matthew; Lawson, Ann Marie (2019-10-17). "An Ancient Harappan Genome Lacks Ancestry from Steppe Pastoralists or Iranian Farmers". Cell. 179 (3): 729–735.e10. doi:10.1016/j.cell.2019.08.048. ISSN 0092-8674. PMC 6800651. PMID 31495572.

Web-sources
