= Pranpir Badshah tomb =

Pranpir Badshah's tomb
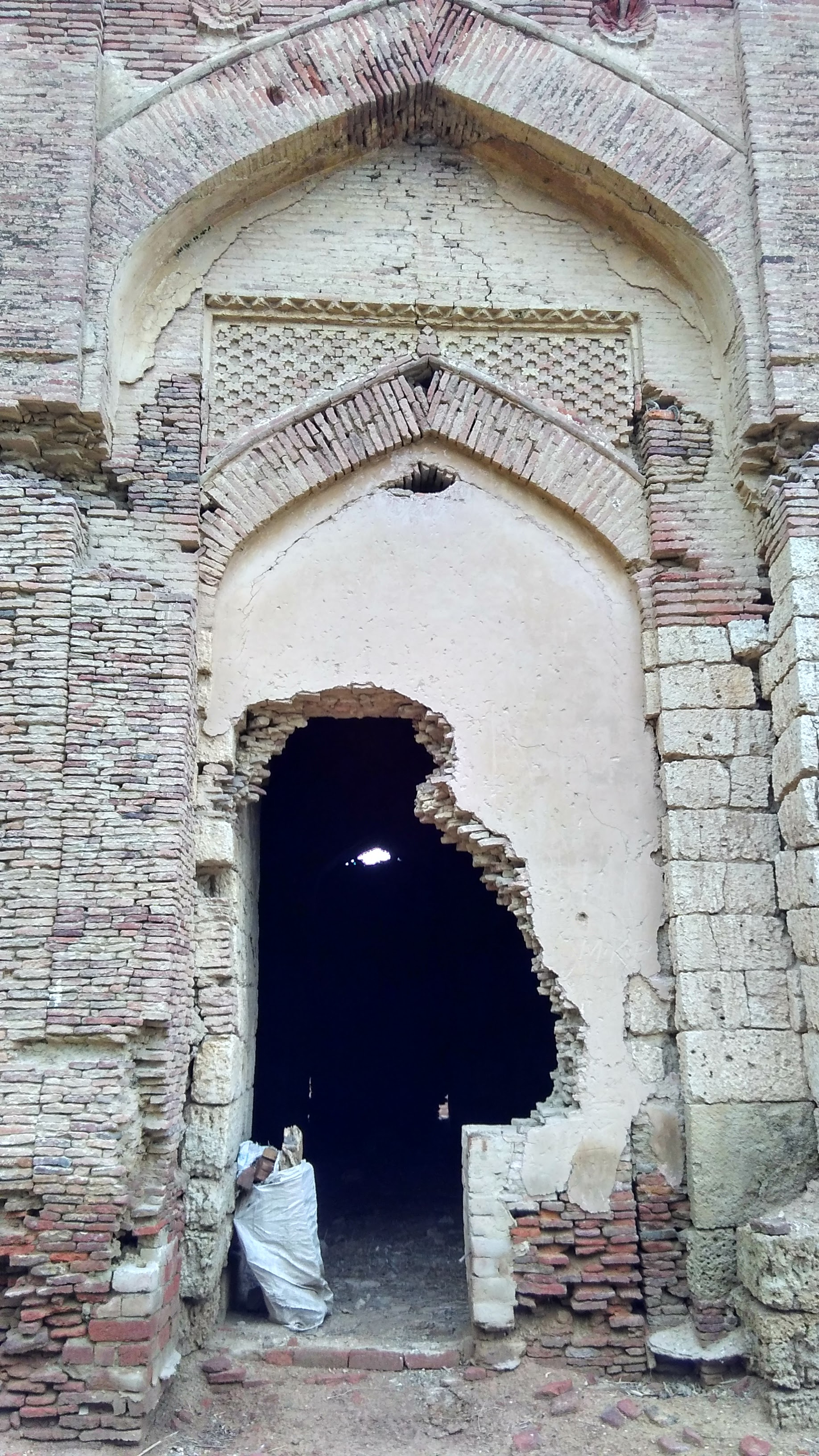
- One of the four arched entrance of Pranpir Badshah's tomb

- Location within Haryana Location within India

General information
- Type: Tomb
- Location: Panchayat Bhawan, Govt college ground, Hisar, Haryana, India
- Coordinates: 29.1477°N 75.7165°E
- Construction started: c. 1300

Height
- Architectural: Indo-Islamic architecture

Pranpir Badshah's tomb (Hindi: बाबा प्राणपिर बादशाह) is a 14th-century tomb, built from white material, near Mahabir Stadium in Hisar city of Haryana state in India.

== Location ==
The tomb is located next to the Panchayat bhawan, within the compound of Government college Hisar, next to Mahabir Stadium.

== History ==
This is the tomb of Baba Pranpir Badshah, the spiritual teacher of Sher Bahlol or Dana Sher. Sher Bahlol was also a spiritual teacher who foretold that Ghiyas-ud-din-Tughluq (c. 1320–25 CE) would become the king of Delhi sultanate.

== Architecture ==
Tomb is built on a raised platform, it built using dressed white kankar stones blocks to a certain height, top of the tomb is built using lakhauri bricks, all four sides have arched gates. The dome on top sits on an octagonal drum, there is no evidence of any grave inside.

== Restoration ==
The tomb is in dilapidated condition, some minor repair work has been taken by Archaeological Survey of India.

== Gallery ==
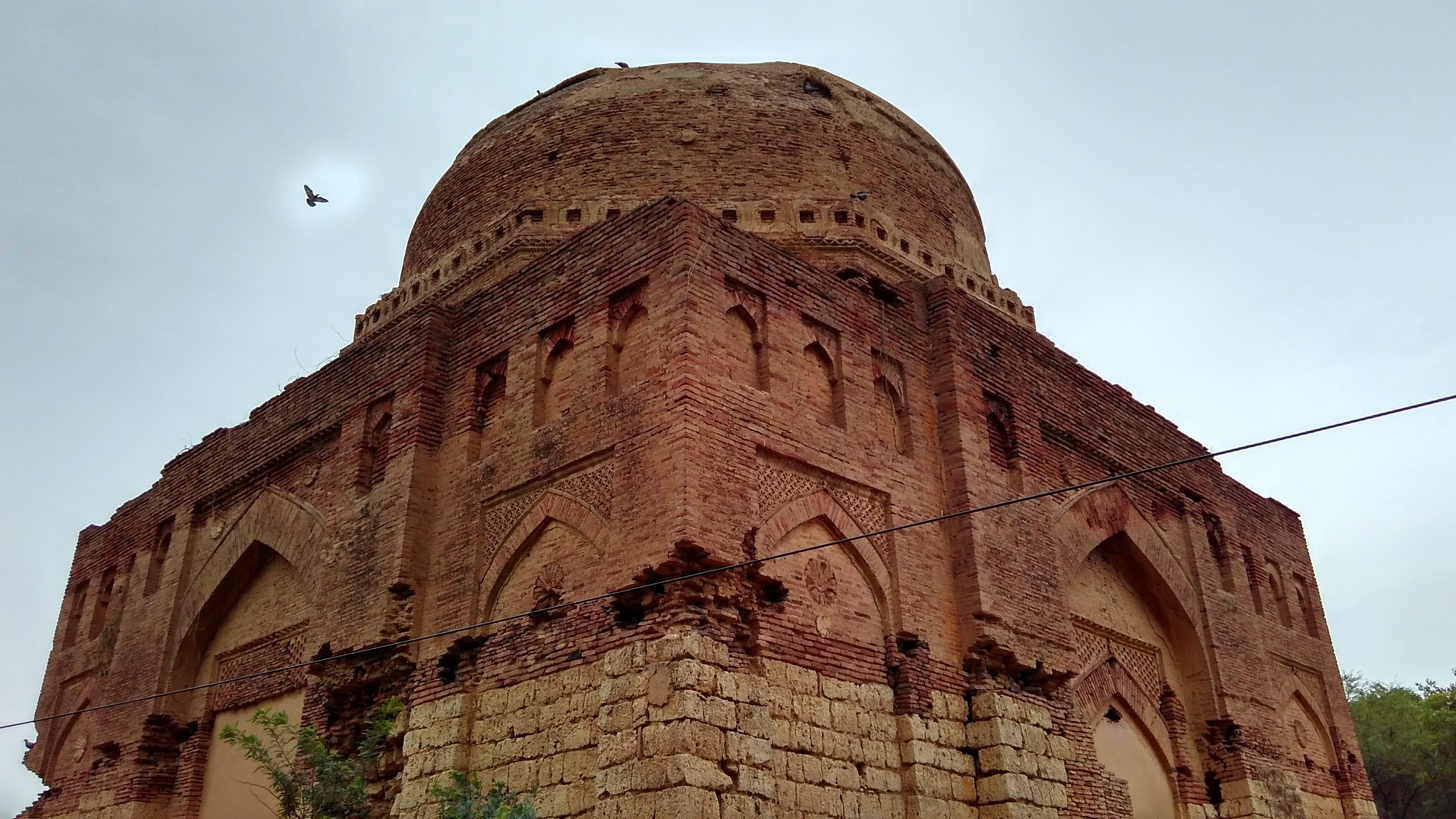
Pranpir Badshah's tomb at Hisar.

== See also ==
- Sheikhpura Kothi at Hansi
- Humayun's Tomb at Delhi
- Ibrahim Lodhi's Tomb at Panipat
- Bu Ali Shah Qalandar at Panipat
- Sheikh Chilli's Tomb at Kurukshetra
- Shah Zia Ud Din Muhammed's tomb at Naraingarh Ambala
- Sheikh Musa's tomb at Nuh
- Shah Nazm al Haq's tomb at Sohna
- Aga Khan Historic Cities Support Programme
