= Sheikhpura Kothi =

- Location within Haryana Location within India
- Former names: Skinner's Estate
- Etymology: Named after the son of James Skinner

General information
- Status: Completed
- Type: Heritage palace Hotel in current usage
- Architectural style: French
- Location: Hansi on NH9, Hansi, Hisar, Haryana, Hansi, India
- Coordinates: 29.1°N 75.97°E
- Current tenants: WelcomHeritage Hotels
- Construction started: 1818
- Completed: 1924
- Owner: Seth Chhaju Ram's family

Technical details
- Material: Brick and Plaster
- Floor count: 2
- Lifts/elevators: 0

Other information
- Number of rooms: 7
- Parking: yes

Website
- www.welcomheritagehotels.in/hotel-details/sheikhpura-kothi-hansi

Sehikhpura Kothi, currently leased and operated as WelcomHeritage Sheikhpura Kothi, is a heritage building. It was built in 1924 by American architect Dinkelberg for the family of Sir Chhaju Ram Lamba the Jat Zamindar and businessman from Alakhpura, and later leased it to WelcomHeritage Hotels for its current operation as a heritage hotel.

It was ranked as the 2nd best hotel in Hisar by TripAdvisor in 2012. It is 154 kilometres (96 mi) west of Delhi and 4 kilometres (2.5 mi) north-east of center of Hansi, on the Hansi-Ugalan road off NH9 Hansi bypass, a few hundred meters from the intersection of NH9 and NH12.

== History ==
It was built in 1924 by American architect Dinkelberg for the family of Sir Chhaju Ram Lamba the Jat Zamindar and businessman from Alakhpura. It was later leased it to WelcomHeritage Hotels for its current operation as a heritage hotel.

== Facilities ==
The hotel has seven rooms and suites, a common room, restaurant, and conference room, and open air gathering for over a thousand people. It arranges excursions to nearby places of interest.

== Recognition ==
- 2nd Best Hotel in Hisar by TripAdvisor (2012)

== See also ==
- List of Museums in Haryana
