= Outline of Haryana =

State in northwestern India

Where in India Haryana is located.

The following outline is provided as an overview of and topical guide to Haryana.

Haryana – one of the 28 states of the democratic Republic of India. Located in northern region of the Indian subcontinent, it is India's 21st largest state by area, and 18th most populous state. Haryana surrounds the National Capital Territory of Delhi on three sides, forming the latter's northern, western and southern borders. The economic, social and cultural facets of Haryana include high economic development, high GDP per capita, high life expectancy, low female-to-male sex ratio, and rich sporting tradition.

== General reference ==
=== Names ===
- Common name: Haryana
  - Pronunciation: /ˌhɑːriˈɑːnə/
- Official name: State of Haryana
- Adjectival(s): Haryanavi
- Etymology and Meaning of the Name: from the Sanskrit words Hari (a name of Vishnu) and ayana (home), meaning "the Abode of God".
- ISO subdivision code: IN-HR

=== Rankings (amongst India's states) ===
Out of total 29 states and union territories (1st highest, 35th lowest):

- by area (higher rank is bigger): 21st (2011 census)
- by population (higher rank is bigger): 18th
- by gross domestic product (GDP) (higher rank is better) : 13th (2014)
- by per capita income (higher rank is better): 6th
- by unemployment rate (lower is better): 20th (47 per 1000)
- by house ownership (higher rank is better): 14th (88.4%)
- by Human Development Index (HDI) (higher rank is better): 9th
- by life expectancy at birth (higher rank is better): 12th
- by vaccination coverage (higher rank is better): 8th (74.8%)
- by low-BMI underweight people: (lower rank is better): male 12th (24.8%), female 15th (25.8%)
- by literacy rate (higher rank is better): 22nd
- by sex ratio (higher rank is better): 30th
- by cognizable crime rate (lower rank is better): 4th (2015)
- by suicide rate (lower rank is better): 15th (10.9 annual suicide per lakh of population)

== Geography of Haryana ==
- Haryana is: an Indian state
- Area of Haryana: 44,212 km^{2}, or 1.34% of India's total geographical area
- Population of Haryana: 25,353,081, or 2.09% of India's population (2011 Census of India)

=== Location of Haryana ===
- Haryana is situated within the following regions:
  - Northern Hemisphere
  - Eastern Hemisphere
    - Eurasia
      - Asia
        - South Asia
          - Indian subcontinent
            - India
              - North India
                - Punjab region
  - Time zone: Indian Standard Time (UTC+05:30)
  - Neighboring jurisdictions Haryana is located next to:
    - Chandigarh
    - Delhi
    - Himachal Pradesh
    - Punjab
    - Rajasthan
    - Uttarakhand
    - Uttar Pradesh

=== Geographic features of Haryana ===
- Topographic features of Haryana
  - Major Physiographic Divisions of Haryana
    - Shivalik Hills to the north east
    - Punjab Plain in the west
    - Ghaggar-Yamuna Plain in the east, forming the largest part of the state
    - Bagar region sandy plains are on the edge of Thar Desert in the south west
    - Aravalli Range in the south
  - Landforms of Haryana
    - Dhosi Hill, an extinct volcano
  - Topographic extremes of Haryana
    - High: Karoh Peak, Morni Hills 1,467 m (4,813 ft)
- Hydrographic features of Haryana

=== Environment of Haryana ===
- Biogeographic realm: Indomalayan
  - Biomes: Tropical and subtropical moist broadleaf forests, Tropical and subtropical dry broadleaf forests, and Deserts and xeric shrublands
    - Ecoregions: Upper Gangetic Plains moist deciduous forests, Khathiar-Gir dry deciduous forests, Northwestern thorn scrub forests, and Thar Desert

==== Wildlife of Haryana ====
- Fauna of Haryana
- Flora of Haryana

==== Protected areas of Haryana ====
- National Parks of Haryana
  - Kalesar National Park, Yamunanagar
  - Sultanpur National Park, Gurugram
- Wildlife Sanctuaries of Haryana
  - Abubshahar Wildlife Sanctuary, Sirsa
  - Bhindawas Wildlife Sanctuary, Jhajjar
  - Bir Shikargah Wildlife Sanctuary, Panchkula
  - Chhilchhila Wildlife Sanctuary, Kurukshetra
  - Khaparwas Wildlife Sanctuary, Jhajjar
  - Khol Hi-Raitan Wildlife Sanctuary, Panchkula
  - Nahar Wildlife Sanctuary, Rewari
  - Saraswati Wildlife Sanctuary, Kaithal
- Endangered Wildlife Breeding Reserves
  - Chinkara Breeding Centre Kairu, Bhiwani
  - Crocodile Breeding Centre, Kurukshetra
  - Vulture Conservation and Breeding Centre, Pinjore
  - Pheasant Breeding Centre Morni
  - Pheasant Breeding Centre, Berwala
  - Peacock & Chinkara Breeding Centre, Jhabua in Rewari district
  - Deer Park, Hisar
- Wetlands
  - Dighal Wetlands, Dighal, Jhajjar, an Important Bird Area
  - Basai Wetland, Gurgaon
  - Blue Bird Lake, Hisar

=== Hierarchy of settlements of Haryana ===
- State (Haryana)
  - Divisions (comprising one or more districts)
    - Districts (comprising cities, towns and villages)
      - Cities and Towns (run by Municipal committee/corporation under Urban Development ministry)
        - Wards (city is subdivided in to several wards)
          - Colonies (each ward has one or more colonies/neighbourhood)
      - Tehsils (Department of Revenue) and Block (Department of Rural Development, area usually overlaps with tehsil)
        - Gram panchayat
          - Village (each panchayat has one or more village)
            - Pana (subdivisions within village are called pana or ward)
            - Dhani (some villages also have scattered isolated dhanis within its official geographical limits)

=== Regions of Haryana ===
==== Administrative Units of Haryana ====
- Divisions of Haryana
  - Ambala division
  - Gurgaon division
  - Hisar division
  - Rohtak division
  - Karnal division
  - Faridabad division
- Districts of Haryana
  - Ambala district
  - Bhiwani district
  - Faridabad district
  - Fatehabad district
  - Gurgaon district
  - Hisar district
  - Jhajjar district
  - Jind district
  - Kaithal district
  - Karnal district
  - Kurukshetra district
  - Mahendragarh district
  - Mewat District
  - Panchkula district
  - Palwal district
  - Panipat district
  - Rewari district
  - Rohtak district
  - Sirsa district
  - Sonipat district
  - Yamuna Nagar district
  - Charkhi Dadri district
- Tehsils of Haryana
- Municipalities of Haryana
  - List of cities in Haryana by population

==== Miscellaneous regions of Haryana ====
- Ahirwal
- Bagar region
- Bhattiana, part of bagar region
- Deswali region, region of Haryana where Deswali dialect of Haryanvi language is spoken
- Khadir and Bangar
- Braj
- Mewat
- Nardak
- South Haryana

== Government and Politics of Haryana ==
- Form of government: State Government of India
- Capital of Haryana: Chandigarh, is also the capital of the state of Punjab, and is a Union territory, separate from the two states.

=== Elections in Haryana ===
- Elections to the Haryana Legislative Assembly
  - List of constituencies of the Haryana Legislative Assembly
    - 1982 Haryana Legislative Assembly election
    - 1987 Haryana Legislative Assembly election
    - 1991 Haryana Legislative Assembly election
    - 2000 Haryana Legislative Assembly election
    - 2005 Haryana Legislative Assembly election
    - 2009 Haryana Legislative Assembly election
    - 2014 Haryana Legislative Assembly election
    - 2019 Haryana Legislative Assembly election
    - 2024 Haryana Legislative Assembly election
- Elections to the Lok Sabha in Haryana
  - List of constituencies of the Lok Sabha in Haryana
    - Indian general election in Haryana, 1991
    - Indian general election in Haryana, 1996
    - Indian general election in Haryana, 1998
    - Indian general election in Haryana, 1999
    - Indian general election in Haryana, 2004
    - Indian general election in Haryana, 2009
    - Indian general election in Haryana, 2014
    - Indian general election in Haryana, 2019
    - Indian general election in Haryana, 2024
- Political parties in Haryana
  - Bharatiya Janata Party (BJP)
  - Indian National Congress (INC)
  - Indian National Lok Dal (INLD)
  - Jannayak Janta Party (JJP)
- Political families of Haryana

=== Branches of the Government of Haryana ===
- Executive branch of Haryana Government
  - Governor of Haryana
    - List of governors of Haryana
      - Raj Bhavan (Haryana)
  - Council of Ministers headed by the Chief Minister of Haryana
    - List of chief ministers of Haryana
      - Secretariat Building (Chandigarh)
  - Haryana Government Departments
    - Department of Economic and Statistical Analysis, Haryana
    - Department of Elementary Education, Haryana
    - Department of Environment, Haryana
    - Department of Excise & Taxation, Haryana
    - Department of Higher Education, Haryana
    - Department of Industrial Training & Vocational Education, Haryana
    - Department of Industries & Commerce, Haryana
    - Department of Institutional Finance & Credit Control, Haryana
    - Department of Labour & Employment, Haryana
    - Department of Land records & Consolidation, Haryana
    - Department of Rehabilitation, Haryana
    - Department of Revenue and Disaster Management, Haryana
    - Department of School Education, Haryana
  - State Agencies of Haryana
    - Dakshin Haryana Bijli Vitran Nigam
    - Debt Conciliation Board
    - Director Secondary Education, Haryana
    - Haryana State Directorate of Archaeology & Museums
    - Haryana Waqf Board
    - Foreign Investment and NRI Cell, Government of Haryana
    - Haryana Civil Medical Services
    - Haryana Environment Protection Council
    - Haryana Land Record Information System
    - Haryana Power Generation Corporation
    - Haryana Roadways
    - Haryana Seeds Development Corporation
    - Haryana State Legal Services Authority, Haryana
    - Haryana Tourism Corporation Limited
    - Haryana Urban Development Authority
    - State Counselling Board, Haryana
    - Uttar Haryana Bijli Vitran Nigam
- Legislative branch of Haryana Government
  - Legislature type: Unicameral consisting of the Haryana Legislative Assembly
    - Palace of Assembly (Chandigarh)
- Judiciary of Haryana
  - Punjab and Haryana High Court
    - List of former Chief Justices of Punjab and Haryana High Court
      - Palace of Justice (Chandigarh)

=== Law and order in Haryana ===
- Haryana Police

== History of Haryana ==
=== History of Haryana, by period ===
- Indus Valley Civilization
  - Balu, Kaithal
  - Fetahabad District -
    - Banawali, Fetahabad - on dried up Saraswati River
    - Bhirrana, Fetahabad
    - Kunal, Fetahabad - IVC "village" site
  - Farmana, Rohtak
  - Jognakhera, Kurukshetra
  - Hisar District -
    - Lohari Ragho, Hisar
    - Rakhigarhi, Hisar
    - Siswal, Hisar
  - Mitathal, Bhiwani

== Culture of Haryana ==
- Festivals of Haryana
- Public holidays in Haryana

=== Art in Haryana ===
==== Literary Arts of Haryana ====
- Literature of Haryana

==== Performing arts of Haryana ====
===== Cinema of Haryana =====
- List of Haryanvi-language films

===== Theatre in Haryana =====
- Saang
- Ras Leela
- Ragini

===== Dance and Music =====
- Folk Dances of Haryana
- Music of Haryana
  - Devotional
    - Chaupaiya (on verses)
    - Holi festival
    - Manjira (type of Cymbal)
    - Ras Leela (of Krishna and Gopis)
    - Ragini
  - Festive seasonal
    - Gogaji and Gugga
    - Holi
    - Phaag,
    - Sawan
    - Teej
  - Ceremonial and recreational
    - Legendary bravery
      - Kissa
      - Ragini
    - Love and romance
      - Been (including its variant Nāginī dance)
      - Ragini
    - Ceremonial
      - Dhamal Dance,
      - Ghoomar
      - Jhoomar (sway, male only)
      - Khoria dance
      - Loor dance
      - Ragini

==== Visual arts of Haryana ====
===== Architecture of Haryana =====
- Forts of Haryana
- List of State Protected Monuments in Haryana
- List of Monuments of National Importance in Haryana
- UNESCO World Heritage Sites in Haryana: Chandigarh Capitol Complex, as part of the Architectural Work of Le Corbusier
  - Open Hand Monument
- Rock Garden of Chandigarh

===== Embroidery of Haryana =====
- Phulkari, which has been awarded the Geographical indication (GI) status in the Indian states of Punjab, Haryana and Rajasthan
- Shisha (embroidery)

=== Clothing and ornaments in Haryana ===
==== Men ====
  - Kurta
  - Pajamas
  - Dhoti
  - Khandwa

==== Women ====
  - Gagra choli (Lehenga and Choli)
  - Shalwar kameez
  - Dupatta, which sometimes used as a Ghoonghat

=== Cuisine of Haryana ===
- North Indian cuisine
  - Punjabi cuisine
    - Haryanvi cuisine
      - Dishes of Haryana

=== Languages and dialects of Haryana ===
- Hindi (Central Zone)
  - Haryanvi language
    - Deswali (dialect) (also called Deshwali, Desari and Desaru, spoken in Deswal region covering districts of Rohtak, Sonipat, Jhajjar, Delhi and north west Gurgaon.
    - Standard Haryanvi (dialect) spoken in Jind, Hisar, Hansi, Bhiwani, Tosham, Charki Dadri, Meham and Gohana.
    - Jatu (dialect)(dialect of the Jats) sub-dialect of deswali, spoken by Jats and Rors in low-lying khadir flood planes on western banks of Yamuna in Panipat, Karnal, Kuruksehtra and Yamunanagar districts.
    - Bangru (dialect) (also called Banagaru, Hariani & Haryiani, spoken in areas between Khadar region, Bagar region and deswali region in Kaithal District, Pehowa, Tohana, Barwala, Narwana and Assandh.
  - Bagri dialect spoken in (Bagar region of sandy western Haryana covering Sirsa, Ellenabad, Fatehabad, Adampur, Balsamand, Siwani and Bahal in Haryana.
  - Sansi dialect (distinct language of Sansi nomads, with influence of Rajasthani, Punjabi, Haryanvi and Hindi languages)
  - Mewati language is spoken in Nuh District, Sohna and part of Palwal District.
    - Ahirwati dialect is spoken in Rewari, Mahendragarh, Narnaul, Loharu, Matanheil and parts of Gurugram District like Pataudi and Manesar.
    - (Rangri dialect is another type for Haryanvi language used by haryanvi-Muslim migrants living in Pakistan)
- Braj Bhasha (Faridabad and Palwal districts)
- Pahari languages (in hill areas of Ambala, Panchkula and Yamuna Nagar districts)
  - Puadhi dialect is spoken in districts of Panchkula District, Ambala District and parts of Kuruksehtra District like Shahbad Markanda.
  - Rathi dialect is spoken in central Sirsa District and northern Fatehabad district..
- Punjabi languages
  - Malwai dialect is spoken in northern Sirsa District which includes Mandi Dabwali, Kalanwali and Odhan. It also spoken in Ratia Tehsil of Fatehbad District.

=== Media in Haryana ===
- TV Channels focused on Haryanavi
  - DD Haryana
- Newspapers in Haryana
  - Amar Ujala
  - Dainik Jagran
  - Hari Bhoomi
  - Punjab Kesari

=== Museums in Haryana ===
- Hisar
  - Haryana Rural Antique Museum
  - Jahaj Kothi Museum
  - Rakhigarhi Indus Valley Civilisation Museum
- Kurukshetra
  - Dharohar Museum
  - Shrikrishna Museum
  - Kurukshetra Panorama and Science Centre

=== People of Haryana ===
- List of people from Haryana

=== Religion in Haryana ===
Population data as per Census of India 2011:

- Hinduism in Haryana, 87.46%
  - Hindu Temples in Haryana
- Sikhism in Haryana, 04.91%
  - Gurdwara Toka Sahib
  - Kapal Mochan
  - Nada Sahib
  - Gurudwara Sheeshganj Sahib
- Islam in Haryana, 07.03%
  - Kabuli Bagh Mosque
- Christianity in Haryana, 0.20%
  - Cantonment Church Tower
  - Immaculate Heart Church, (Karnal)
  - Seventh-day Adventist Church, Nilokheri
  - St. Thomas Church, Hisar
  - The United Church, Nilokheri
- Jainism in Haryana, 0.21%
- Buddhism in Haryana, 0.03%
  - Adi Badri stupa
  - Agroha Mound
  - Assandh Stupa
  - Fatehabad Ashokan Pillar
  - Hisar Ashokan Pillar
  - Thaneshwar Stupa
  - Topra Kalan Ahokan Edicts Park
  - Srughna (Sugh in Yamuna Nagaer)
- Others, 0.01%
- Not stated, 0.17%
- Punjabi folk religion
  - Naugaja Peer

=== Sports in Haryana ===
- Governing Bodies for Sports in Haryana:
  - Haryana Archery Association
  - Haryana Cricket Association
- Sports' Clubs and Academies in Haryana:
  - Bhiwani Boxing Club
  - Chandigarh Golf Club
  - DLF Golf and Country Club
- State Teams of Haryana:
  - Haryana cricket team
  - Haryana football team
- Sports venues in Haryana:
  - Stadiums in Haryana

=== State Symbols of Haryana ===
- State animal: Blackbuck
- State Bird: Black francolin
- State Flower: Lotus
- State Tree: Peepal
- State seal: Seal of Haryana

== Economy and infrastructure of Haryana ==
Economy of Haryana

=== Agriculture and Allied Sectors in Haryana ===
- Green Revolution in Haryana
- Livestock Breeds in Haryana
  - Haryanvi cattle, Mewati cattle, and Sahiwal cattle, all of which are breeds of Zebu
  - Murrah buffalo
  - Nali Sheep, Muzzafarnagri (Sheep) and Hissardale (Sheep)
- ICAR-affiliated Institutions, Universities, National Bureaus and Research Centres in Haryana
  - Central Institute for Research on Buffaloes (CIRB), Hisar
  - Central Sheep Breeding Farm, Hisar
  - Chaudhary Charan Singh Haryana Agricultural University, Hisar
    - List of agricultural centres established by CCS HAU
  - Government Livestock Farm, Hisar
  - ICAR CIFE Rohtak centre
  - Indian Institute of Wheat and Barley Research, Karnal
  - Lala Lajpat Rai University of Veterinary & Animal Sciences, Hisar
  - National Bureau of Animal Genetic Resources, Karnal
  - National Dairy Research Institute, Karnal
  - Northern Region Farm Machinery Training and Testing Institute
  - National Research Centre on Equines, Hisar
  - Regional Fodder Station, Hisar

==== Irrigation ====
- Dams
  - Bhakra Dam
  - Lakhwar Dam on Yamuna (including downstream Yvasi Dam and Katapathar Barrage), under-construction
  - Renuka Dam on Yamuna, under-construction
  - Kishau Dam on Tons River, proposed
- Rivers
  - Yamuna and its tributaries including Sahibi River (and tributaries)
  - Ghagghar-Hakra river
- Canals
  - Western Yamuna Canal
  - Rajasthan Canal

=== Industry Sector in Haryana ===
- Manufacturing
  - Automotive industry in Haryana
  - National Fertilizers Limited plant at Panipat
  - Indian Oil Corporation's Panipat Refinery
- Economic and Industrial Corridors, and Investment Regions
  - Special Economic Zones in Haryana
  - Amritsar Delhi Kolkata Industrial Corridor
  - Delhi Mumbai Industrial Corridor Project Haryana nodes

=== Services Sector in Haryana ===
- Banking in Haryana
  - State Bank of Patiala, an associate bank of the State Bank Group
  - Oriental Bank of Commerce
  - Sarva Haryana Gramin Bank, a Regional Rural Bank
  - Haryana State Cooperative Apex Bank Ltd.
- Tourism in Haryana

=== Transportation in Haryana ===
- Road network in Haryana
  - Ancient routes passing through Haryana
    - Delhi–Multan road
    - Grand Trunk Road
  - Expressways passing through Haryana
    - Ambala–Chandigarh Expressway
    - Delhi–Faridabad Skyway
    - Delhi–Gurgaon Expressway
    - Eastern Peripheral Expressway
    - Faridabad–Noida–Ghaziabad Expressway
    - Himalayan Expressway
    - Western Peripheral Expressway
    - Panipat Elevated Expressway
    - Pathankot–Ajmer Expressway
  - National Highways passing through Haryana
    - North–south oriented highways (with even numbers increasing from the east to the west): NH 44 (NH 344), NH 48, NH 52 (NH 152, NH 352)
    - East–west oriented highways (with odd numbers increasing from the north to the south): NH 5 (NH 105), NH 7 (NH 907), NH 9 (NH 709), NH 19 (NH 919)
    - Parts of Golden Quadrilateral in Haryana
  - State Highways in Haryana
    - List of state highways in Haryana
- Railway network in Haryana
  - Freight corridors
    - Eastern Dedicated Freight Corridor
    - Western Dedicated Freight Corridor
  - High-speed rail network
    - Diamond Quadrilateral
  - Zonation of Indian Railways with respect to Haryana
    - Northern Railway zone
      - Ambala railway division
        - Kalka–Shimla Railway, a UNESCO World Heritage Site along with the other Mountain railways of India
      - Delhi railway division
    - North Central Railway zone
    - North Western Railway zone
      - Bikaner railway division
  - Railway Stations in Haryana
- Aviation in Haryana
  - Airports in Haryana
    - Civil airports in Haryana
      - Bhiwani Airport
      - Hisar Airport
      - Karnal Airport
      - Narnaul Airport
      - Pinjore Airport, also called Kalka Airport
    - Military airports in Haryana
      - Ambala Air Force Station
      - Sirsa Air Force Station
    - Military and Civil Airports in Haryana
      - Chandigarh Airport, a restricted international airport
  - Pilot Training Institutes in Haryana
    - Haryana Institute of Civil Aviation

=== Energy in Haryana ===
- Electricity sector in Haryana
  - Status of Rural electrification: 100%
- List of power stations in Haryana
  - Coal-based power stations in Haryana
    - Deenbandhu Chhotu Ram Thermal Power Station, Yamunanagar
    - Faridabad Thermal Power Station
    - Indira Gandhi Super Thermal Power Project, Jhajjar
    - Mahatma Gandhi Super Thermal Power Project, Jhajjar
    - Panipat Thermal Power Station I
    - Panipat Thermal Power Station II
    - Rajiv Gandhi Thermal Power Station, Hisar
  - Natural gas-based power stations in Haryana
    - Faridabad Thermal Power Plant
  - Diesel-based power stations in Haryana
    - Ambala Diesel Power Station
  - Nuclear power stations
    - Gorakhpur Nuclear Power Plant, Fatehabad
  - Solar power stations in Haryana
    - Faridabad Solar PV Power Plant
    - IIT Bombay - Gwal Pahari, Haryana
- Energy-related research and training Institutes in Haryana:
  - National Power Training Institute
  - National Institute of Solar Energy, Gurgaon
    - International Solar Alliance Headquarters, Gurgaon

== Education in Haryana ==
- Haryana Board of School Education
- Director Secondary Education, Haryana
- Central University of Haryana
- Chaudhary Charan Singh Haryana Agricultural University
- List of institutions of higher education in Haryana
  - Haryana Institute of Technology (HIT)
  - Haryana Technical Institute
  - ITM University, Gurgaon, Haryana

== Heath and safety in Haryana ==
- Herbal Parks
  - Ch. Devi Lal Herbal Nature Park
  - Ch. Surender Singh Memorial Herbal Park, Kairu
  - Ch. Surender Singh Memorial Herbal Park, Tosham
  - Shatavar Vatika Herbal Park, Hisar

== See also ==
- Outline of India
- Haryana Colony
- Haryana Gana Parishad
- Haryana Sikh Gurdwara Parbandhak Committee
- Haryana State Akali Dal
- Haryana Vikas Party
- Kharkhoda (Haryana)
- Nirmal Singh (Haryana)
- Pur (Bhiwani, Haryana)
- Vishal Haryana Party

Archaeological

- Agroha Mound

Historical

- Bhima Devi Temple Complex at Pinjore
- Farrukhnagar
- Mughal Bridge at Kernal
- Harsh ka Tilla at Kurukshetra
- Nahar Singh Mahal
- Narnaul
- Pataudi Palace
- Pinjore Gardens
- Sthaneshwar Mahadev Temple
- Surajkund
- Tomb of Saikh Taiyab at Kaithal
- Tosham rock inscription

Zoos in Haryana

- Hisar Deer Park
- Rohtak Zoo
- Pipli Zoo

Dams in Haryana

- Anagpur Dam
- Hathnikund Barrage
- Ottu barrage
- Tajewala Barrage

Public places

- Courtyard by Marriott
- Kingdom of Dreams
- Mall of India
- The Oberoi
