= Ram Bilas Sharma (politician) =

Indian politician

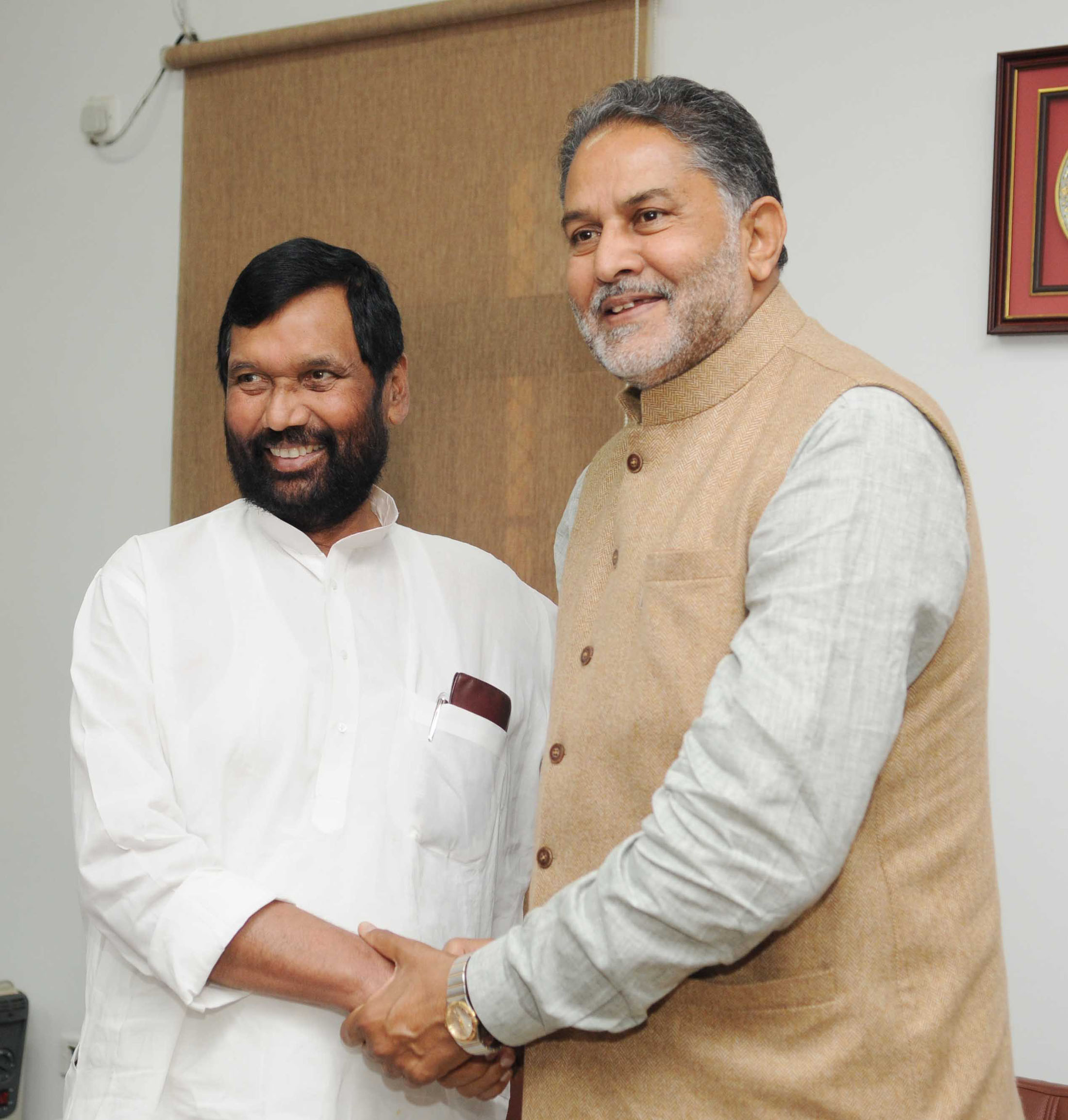
- Sharma (right) with Ram Vilas Paswan in 2015

Cabinet Minister Government of Haryana
- In office 26 October 2014 – 27 October 2019
- Ministry: Term
- Minister of Education Minister of Parliamentary Affairs Minister of Tourism: 26 October 2014 - 27 October 2019
- Minister of Transport Minister of Food & Civil Supplies: 26 October 2014 - 24 July 2015
- Minister of Civil Aviation: 26 October 2014 - 22 July 2016
- Minister of Art & Cultural Affairs: 9 August 2018 - 27 October 2019

Member of Haryana Legislative Assembly
- In office 2014–2019
- Preceded by: Rao Dan Singh
- Succeeded by: Rao Dan Singh
- Constituency: Mahendragarh
- In office 1982–2001
- Preceded by: Dali Singh
- Succeeded by: Rao Dan Singh
- Constituency: Mahendragarh

President Bharatiya Janata Party, Haryana
- In office 5 January 2013 – 26 November 2014
- Preceded by: Krishan Pal Gurjar
- Succeeded by: Subhash Barala
- In office December 1990 – December 1993

Personal details
- Born: 25 July 1950 (age 76) Rathiwas, Punjab, India
- Party: Bharatiya Janata Party
- Education: Punjab University
- Occupation: Lawyer / professor
- Website: www.rambilas.in

Ram Bilas Sharma (born 25 July 1950) is an Indian former Cabinet Minister in Bharatiya Janata Party's Government of Haryana, and former education minister and politician who has represented the Mahendragarh constituency as an MLA in the northern state of Haryana five times.

== Early life ==
Ram Bilas Sharma was born on 25 July 1951 in Rathiwas, a small village of 393 people (2011) located in Mahendragarh Tehsil of Mahendragarh district, Haryana, in the family of Shri Jayram Sharma. Born in a farmer's family with 8 siblings (6 sisters & 2 brothers) he had faced several challenges in his childhood but never compromised on his education. He completed his primary education from the Government primary schools in Devrali and Swaroopgadh.

== Education ==
After completing his higher secondary education from Madhogadh School in 1967, he completed B.A. (Arts) from Mahendergarh Degree College. During this period he was introduced to Rashtriya Swayamsevak Sangh (RSS)' by RSS Pracharak Rajinder Singh (now in Hisar). Influenced by the RSS, Sharma began to contribute to its growth. Immediately after completing his graduation in 1970, to fulfill his father's wish, he married Bimala Devi on 15 June 1970.

Soon after his marriage, he left for Delhi to take over the responsibilities at Sangh's Jhandelwalan branch, wherein he had joined as a proofreader for the English daily Motherland. Concurrently, he pursued his post-graduation, M.A. in English by attending evening classes at the Ghaziabad University from 1971 to 1973. After completing his M.A., while pursuing his BEd degree from Kirodimal College at Bhiwani (1973–74) he had to face several challenges to meet his education & routine expenses and even had worked as a night watchman. At that time he was chosen as a "Pracharak" by the Rashtriya Swyamsevak Sangh (RSS) for its Jhajjar unit.

He is also an avid devotee of Lord Shiva and had restored an ancient temple of Baba Bhuraasta which was discovered during an excavation activity in his native village Rathiwas. He had also made over 17 Kanwar Yatra by feet to Haridwar to seek Lord Shiva's blessings and organized numerous religious functions in the region.

== Political life ==
In 1974, he had joined the Jayaprakash Narayan Movement. Late Dr. Mangal Sen, requested him to quit his job as a professor in Kurukshetra and brought him along to Rohtak where he was appointed as General Secretary of the Rashtriya Swayamsevak Sangh (RSS).

=== 1980s–90s: As MLA and Minister ===
In his political career Ram Bilas Sharma has been elected as the Bharatiya Janata Party's MLA from Mahendergarh area four times in a row. He served as Public Health minister from 1987 to 1990 and Education minister from 1996 to 1999.

He has been Minister of Education in the Government of Haryana under the government of Chaudhary Bansi Lal.

In 1999, as leader of the Bharatiya Janata Party legislature party he decided to withdraw support from the Bansi Lal Government and endorse the Om Prakash Chautala Government instead. Professor Sharma also contested election from Ballabgarh constituency where he called Kulena as his second home and many times took blessings from Bhagwan Parsuram Temple at Kulena.

=== 1990s till 2010: As President of Bharatiya Janata Party Haryana ===
He was also the state Bharatiya Janata Party (BJP) president from 1990 to 1993. He was elected as BJP's state president for the second time in 2013. In 2014, he was the President of BJP, Haryana and a claimant for the post of Chief Minister of Haryana in 2014.

=== 2014: Cabinet Minister of Haryana ===
On 26 October, he was sworn in as Cabinet Minister in the Bharatiya Janata Party run Government of Haryana. As a Cabinet Minister he had independent charge of the following 9 departments, which made him 2nd most influential in Government of Haryana after Chief Minister of Haryana Manohar Lal Khattar who held 18 departments. Ram Bilas held 13 departments.

- Department of Archaeology & Museums, Haryana
- Department of Food & Supplies, Haryana
- Department of Civil Aviation, Haryana
- Department of Transport, Haryana, Department of Transport (Regulatory Wing), Haryana
- Haryana Tourism
- Department of Hospitality, Haryana
- Department of Education & Languages, Haryana had four sub-departments Director of Secondary Education, Haryana, Department of Higher Education, Haryana, Department of School Education, Haryana Official website, Department of Elementary Education, Haryana
- Department of Technical Education, Haryana
- Department of Parliamentary Affairs, Haryana

He lost the general assembly election of 2019 to Sh.Dan Singh on Mahender Garh constituency. Currently he is active in social service in the area.

== See also ==
- Hindu nationalist parties
