= List of national projects of the Ministry of Water Resources of India =

Government of India has approved a scheme of National Projects to be implemented during XI Plan (2007–2012) with a view to expedite completion of identified National Projects for the benefit of the people. Such projects will be provided financial assistance by the Government of India in the form of Central grant which will be 90% of the estimated cost of such projects for their completion in a time bound manner.
I. Criteria for selection of National Projects
II. Procedure for inclusion as National project
III.Funding of the National Project
IV. Work plan and time schedule for completion of National Projects
V. Monitoring for National Projects
VI. Review by steering committee
VI. Evaluation and impact assessment

List of projects so far declared by the Government as national projects
Sl. No.	Name of the project	State	Status
1	Gosi Khurd Irrigation Project	Maharashtra	Project is under Execution
2	Shahpurkandi dam project	Punjab	Project is under Execution
3	Teesta Barrage Project	West Bengal	Project is under Execution
4	Saryu Nahar Pariyojna	Uttar Pradesh	Project is under Execution
5	Polavaram Project	Andhra Pradesh	Project is under Execution
6	Lakhwar Vyasi Multipurpose Project	Uttrakhand	Lakhwar as standalone project (300MW) accepted by TAC. The project was considered by Investment Clearance Committee of MoWR, RD & GR in its meeting held on 24.2.2016.
7	Renuka Dam Project	Himachal Pradesh	Technical clearances from CWC is to be obtained by HPPCL. Environment Clearance granted by MoEF & CC was under challenge in NGT. NGT has cited discrepancies in the requirement of land figures (forest and non-forest, Government and Non-Government)
8	Ujh Multipurpose Project	Jammu and Kashmir	DPR under appraisal in CWC/CEA
9	Kishau Multipurpose Project	Himachal Pradesh/Uttrakhand	DPR prepared. MOU for Joint Venture between Govt. Of UK and Govt. Of HP signed. JV SPV yet to be formed.
10	Ken Betwa Link Project	Madhya Pradesh	Updated cost estimate of the project(2015-16 PL) was submitted in CWC by NWDA in February 2016 which is under examination. DPR of Phase- II is yet to be submitted to CWC by NWDA.
11	Kulsi Dam Project	Assam	Project is Under appraisal in CWC/CEA. Compliance to the observations of CWC/CEA on the DPR of the project are pending.
12	Noa-Dihing Dam Project	Arunachal Pradesh	Project is Under appraisal in CWC/CEA. Compliance to the observations of CWC/CEA on the DPR of the project are pending.
13	Bursar HE Project	Jammu & Kashmir	DPR under preparation by NHPC
14	Gyspa HE Project	Himachal Pradesh	DPR under preparation by Govt. Of Himachal Pradesh
15	2nd Ravi Vyas Link Project	Punjab	Under PFR stage.
16	Upper Siang Project	Arunachal Pradesh	Under PFR stage

== See also ==
- Indian Rivers Inter-link
- List of major rivers of India
- List of national waterways in India
