= Faridabad Thermal Power Station =

Coal-fired power plant in Haryana, India

- Country: India
- Location: Faridabad, Faridabad, Haryana
- Coordinates: 28.374°N 77.307°E
- Status: Closed
- Commission date: 1974
- Operator: HPGCL

Thermal power station
- Primary fuel: Coal

Power generation
- Units operational: 1
- Nameplate capacity: 55.00 MW

Faridabad Thermal Power Station is located in the New Industrial Township of the Indian city of Faridabad, 30 kilometres (19 mi) from the capital Delhi. It is one of the coal-based power plants owned by Haryana Power Generation Corporation Limited. Presently the plant is shut down.

== Power plant ==
Originally, the installed capacity was 180 megawatts (240,000 hp) in three units of 60 megawatts (80,000 hp) each. Units 1 and 3 were phased out because of ageing. The power station has been shut down and decommissioned as of 2017.

== Installed capacity ==
Stage	Unit number	Installed capacity (MW)	Date of commissioning	Status
Stage I	1	60	1974	Closed
Stage I	2	60	1976	Closed
Stage I	3	60	1981	Closed

== See also ==
- Deenbandhu Chhotu Ram Thermal Power Station
- Panipat Thermal Power Station I
- Panipat Thermal Power Station II
- Rajiv Gandhi Thermal Power Station
