= Rao Dan Singh =

Indian politician

Rao Dan Singh Yadav

Member of Haryana Legislative Assembly
- In office 2019–2024
- Preceded by: Ram Bilas Sharma
- Succeeded by: Kanwar Singh Yadav
- Constituency: Mahendragarh
- In office 2000–2014
- Preceded by: Ram Bilas Sharma
- Succeeded by: Ram Bilas Sharma
- Constituency: Mahendragarh

Personal details
- Born: 5 May 1959 (age 67)
- Party: Indian National Congress
- Spouse: Sandhya Singh
- Children: 2
- Education: M.A, LL.B., MBA; Diploma in Laws and Personal Management
- Website: http://www.raodansingh.in

Dan Singh Yadav (born 9 May 1959) is an Indian politician and a former Member of the Legislative Assembly (India) representing the Mahendragarh constituency. Dan Singh is a member of the Indian National Congress.

He was President of LBS College, Jaipur, and General Secretary of the Haryana Pradesh Youth Congress. He was elected to the Legislative Assembly in 2000, 2005, 2009 and 2019.

== Personal life ==
Singh was born in 1959 in Pahladgarh. He was educated in Chandigarh and Jaipur and attained Master of Arts, LL.B and M.B.A. degrees, as well as a Diploma in Labour Law. He married Sandhya Singh and they have two children.

His son, Akshat Singh Yadav is married to daughter of Rao Narbir Singh, Cabinet Minister, Government of Haryana.

== Career graph ==
- 2000 – MLA (Mahendragarh constituency)
- 2005 – MLA (Mahendragarh constituency)
- 2009 – MLA (Mahendragarh constituency)
- 2012 onward – President, Haryana Football Association
- 2019 - MLA (Mahendragarh constituency)
- 2012 onward – Vice-President, Haryana Olympic Association
