= Rajiv Gandhi Thermal Power Station =

Power plant in Haryana, India

- Country: India
- Location: Khedar village, Hisar district, Haryana
- Coordinates: 29°20′50″N 75°51′36″E
- Status: Operational
- Commission date: 2010
- Operator: Haryana Power Generation Corporation Limited (HPGCL)

Thermal power station
- Primary fuel: Coal

Power generation
- Units operational: 2 × 600 MW
- Nameplate capacity: 1,200 MW

Rajiv Gandhi Thermal Power Station is located at Khedar village near Barwala in Hisar district of Haryana, India. The power plant is one of the coal based power plants of Haryana Power Generation Corporation Limited (HPGCL).

The Engineering, procurement and construction (EPC) contract was given to Reliance Infrastructure.

== Power plant ==
The work for a 1,200 MW coal-fired power plant was awarded during 2007. The total estimated cost of the project is around ₹4,297 crores. The cost of ₹3.19 crore per MW for this project is lowest among all the Thermal power plants in India. Both the units 2x600 MW were commissioned.

== Installed capacity ==
Stage	Unit Number	Installed Capacity (MW)	Date of Commissioning	Status
Stage I	1	600	March, 2010	Running
Stage I	2	600	October, 2010	Running

== See also ==
- Deenbandhu Chhotu Ram Thermal Power Station
- Panipat Thermal Power Station I
- Panipat Thermal Power Station II
- Faridabad Thermal Power Station
