= Department of Environment, Haryana =

Department of the Government of Haryana in India

Government of Haryana Department of Environment, Haryana

Agency overview
- Jurisdiction: Government of Haryana
- Headquarters: Chandigarh; 30°45′40″N 76°48′2″E
- Minister responsible: Captain Abhimanyu Singh Sindhu
- Website: http://hryenvironment.nic.in/

The Department of Environment, Haryana is a Ministry and department of the Government of Haryana in India.

== Description ==
This department came into existence when Haryana was established as a new state within India after being separated from Punjab. Abhimanyu Sindhu is the cabinet minister responsible for this department from October 2014.

== See also ==
- Forests Department, Haryana
- Government of Haryana
