= Department of Economic and Statistical Analysis, Haryana =

Government department of Haryana, India

Government of Haryana Planning Ministry (Department of Economic and Statistical Ananlysis, Haryana) योजना विभाग, हरियाणा

Agency overview
- Jurisdiction: Government of Haryana
- Headquarters: Chandigarh; 30°45′40″N 76°48′2″E
- Minister responsible: Captain Abhimanyu Singh Sindhu
- Website: URL

Department of Economic and Statistical Analysis, Haryana (Hindi: योजना विभाग, हरियाणा) is a ministry and department of the government of Haryana in India.

== Description ==
The department came into existence when Haryana was established as a new state within India after being separated from Punjab. Abhimanyu Sindhu has been the cabinet minister responsible for the department since October 2014.

== See also ==
- Government of Haryana
