= HCMS (disambiguation) =

HCMS may refer to:

- Haryana Civil Medical Services, the government service in the department of health in Haryana, India
- Heron Creek Middle School, a middle school in North Port, Florida, United States
- Iskushuban Airport (ICAO airport code HCMS) in Iskushuban, Somalia
- Headless content management system
