= Khanda Kheri =

- Village
- Location within Haryana Location within India
- Coordinates: 29.189099°N 76.213606°E
- Country: India
- State: Haryana
- District: Hisar

Government
  - Type: Local government
  - Body: Panchayat

Languages
  - Official: Hindi
- Time zone: UTC+5:30 (IST)
- PIN: 125038
- Vehicle registration: HR-21
- Website: haryana.gov.in

Khanda Kheri is a village in Hansi Tehsil, Hisar District in the Indian state of Haryana.

== Education ==
The Govt Girls School was established in 1901.

== Geography ==
It is connected to Hisar city via road and is 18 kilometres (11 mi) from Jind.

== Demography ==
According to the 2011 census, the population was 7,719, including 4,190 males and 3,529 females in 1,496 households. The literacy rate is 99.5%.

== Notables ==
- Capt. Abhimanyu Singh Sindhu, ex Cabinet Minister in Haryana govt., director of Sindhu Education Foundation, editor-founder of Hari Bhoomi
- K. K. Sindhu, DG of Haryana police academy Madhuban.
- Ch. Sarup Singh, a former minister of Excise and Taxation, Development and Cooperation, Haryana
- Prof. Jagat Singh Lohan, founder of Handball Federation of India, Throwball Federation of India, Netball Federation of India, Attended Munich Olympics.
- Sh. Jaswant Singh former minister of Haryana.
- Sh. Amar Singh former minister of Haryana.
- Azad Singh Khanda Kheri renowned folk singer of Haryana
