= Ram Kumar Gautam =

Indian politician

Member of Haryana Legislative Assembly
- In office 2005–2009
- Preceded by: Ram Bhagat
- Succeeded by: Saroj Mor
- Constituency: Narnaund
- In office 2019–2024
- Preceded by: Abhimanyu Singh Sindhu
- Succeeded by: Jassi Petwar

Personal details
- Born: 8 April 1946 (age 80) Narnaund, Haryana, India
- Party: Bharatiya Janata Party
- Occupation: Politician

Ram Kumar Gautam (born 8 April 1946) is an Indian politician. He was first elected to the Haryana legislative assembly from Narnaund constituency in 2005 within BJP party and he was elected for second time to the Haryana Legislative Assembly from Narnaund in the 2019 Haryana Legislative Assembly election as a member of the Jannayak Janta Party.

He has BA, LLB degree.

His wife is retired as Associate Professor- Political Science. His son Rajat Gautam is an advocate of Punjab and Haryana High Court and had been chairman of Bar Council of Punjab and Haryana High Court. His daughter Kirti Bhardwaj is settled in Canada.

He lives in Gautam colony.

He became a Member of Legislative Assembly 2019, elected against Captain Abhimanyu (Khanda).
