= Department of Rehabilitation, Haryana =

Indian department

Government of Haryana Department of Rehabilitation, Haryana

Agency overview
- Jurisdiction: Government of Haryana
- Headquarters: Haryana Civil Secretariat, Sector-1, Chandigarh; 30°45′40″N 76°48′2″E
- Minister responsible: Captain Abhimanyu Singh Sindhu
- Website: http://haryana.gov.in/

Department of Rehabilitation, Haryana is a Ministry and department of the Government of Haryana in India.

== Description ==
This department came into existence when Haryana was established as a new state within India after being separated from Punjab. The department is responsible for the rehabilitation of displaced people who have lost their homes due to government land acquisition. Dushyant Chautala is the cabinet minister responsible for this department from October 2014. Haryana State Archives has recently acquired the records of Rehabilitation Department, Haryana (1946–1956) relating to claims and allotments.

== See also ==
- Government of Haryana
