= Department of Land records & Consolidation, Haryana =

Government department of Haryana, India

Government of Haryana Department of Land Records & Consolidation, Haryana

Agency overview
- Jurisdiction: Government of Haryana
- Headquarters: Haryana Civil Secretariat, Sector-1, Chandigarh; 30°45′40″N 76°48′2″E
- Minister responsible: Captain Abhimanyu Singh Sindhu
- Website: http://jansahayak.gov.in/CopyLandRecord.aspx

Department of Land Records & Consolidation, Haryana is a Ministry and department of the Government of Haryana in India.

== Description ==
This department came into existence when Haryana was established as a new state within India after being separated from Punjab. Abhimanyu Sindhu is the cabinet minister responsible for this department from October 2014.

== See also ==
- Government of Haryana
