= Department of Institutional Finance & Credit Control, Haryana =

Indian governmental department

Government of Haryana Department of Institutional Finance & Credit Control, Haryana

Agency overview
- Jurisdiction: Government of Haryana
- Headquarters: Haryana Civil Secretariat, Sector-1, Chandigarh; 30°45′40″N 76°48′2″E
- Minister responsible: Captain Abhimanyu Singh Sindhu
- Website: http://www.finhry.gov.in/IFCC/IFCC.html

Department of Institutional Finance & Credit Control, Haryana is a Ministry and department of the government of Haryana in India.

== Description ==
This department came into existence when Haryana was established as a new state within India after being separated from Punjab. The department obtains credit and monitors borrowing from banks and other credit institutions. The department has no field office. The Cabinet Minister Captain Abhimanyu Singh Sindhu is the minister responsible for this department from October 2014.

== See also ==
- Government of Haryana
