= HBSE =

HBSE may refer to:

- Hanna-Barbera Studios Europe, British animation studio
- Harris Blitzer Sports & Entertainment, American sports and venue management company
- Haryana Board of School Education, school board serving the Indian state of Haryana
