= Department of Industrial Training & Vocational Education, Haryana =

Ministry of Government of Haryana, India

Government of Haryana Department of Industrial Training & Vocational Education, Haryana

Agency overview
- Jurisdiction: Government of Haryana
- Headquarters: Chandigarh; 30°45′40″N 76°48′2″E
- Minister responsible: Captain Abhimanyu Singh Sindhu
- Website: Haryanatax

Department of Industrial Training & Vocational Education, Haryana is a Ministry and department of the Government of Haryana in India.

== Description ==
This department came into existence when Haryana was established as a new state within India after being separated from Punjab. Abhimanyu Sindhu is the cabinet minister responsible for this department from October 2014. The department oversees industrial and vocational training through Government of Haryana-owned and privately owned Industrial Training Institutes (ITI) in the state of Haryana.

The department has embarked on a project to upgrade the Industrial Training Institutes (ITI) in the state of Haryana into Center of Excellence (CoE)s.

== See also ==
- Government of Haryana
