= Sarup Singh (Haryana Vidhan Sabha Speaker) =

Indian legislator

Speaker of the Haryana Legislative Assembly
- In office 16 November 1973 – 4 July 1977

Personal details
- Party: Indian National Congress
- Occupation: Politician

Sarup Singh (6 October 1919 – 23 August 2009) was an Indian legislator. He was born in the village of Khanda Kheri. He graduated from Ramjas College and obtained his bachelor's degree in Law from the University of Law College, Lahore.

== Political career ==
He was elected to the Legislative Assembly and was also elected Deputy Speaker of Vidhan Sabha in Joint Punjab. After the formation of Haryana as a separate State of India, he was elected to the Legislative Assembly and served as Minister of Excise and Taxation and also as Minister of Development and Cooperation in Haryana. He was again elected to the Legislative Assembly and also elected as Speaker of Haryana Vidhan Sabha.

== Personal life ==
He was married to Smt Kamla Devi of the village daulat pur in Hisar district. He is survived by his wife kamla devi, his daughter Neelam Dahiya married to Jai Paul Singh Dahiya IAS (retd); his sons Kulbir Singh Sindhu, Director Principal(HPTI) married to Vandana Beniwal from Beniwals family of Sirsa District and Sukhbir Singh Sindhu, Advocate married to Shashi from Maliks family of Panipat District and grandchildren Dr Venu Pal Singh Dahiya, Dr. Riju Pal Singh Dahiya, Nandini Sindhu, Suvir Sindhu, Tanya Sindhu, Sanjeet Sindhu and great grand children. He died on 23 August 2009.
