= Department of Labour and Employment (Haryana) =

Indian government department

Government of Haryana Department of Labour & Employment, Haryana

Agency overview
- Jurisdiction: Government of Haryana
- Headquarters: Haryana Civil Secretariat, Sector-1, Chandigarh; 30°45′40″N 76°48′2″E
- Minister responsible: Dushyant Chautala
- Website: http://haryana.gov.in/

Department of Labour & Employment, Haryana is a Ministry and department of the Government of Haryana in India.

== Description ==
This department came into existence when Haryana was established as a new state within India after being separated from Punjab. Dushyant Chautala is the cabinet minister responsible for this department from October 2019.

== See also ==
- Government of Haryana
