= Mahendragarh Assembly constituency =

Legislative Assembly constituency in Haryana State, India

Coordinates: 28.27°N 76.15°E

Mahendragarh
- Constituency No. 69 for the Haryana Legislative Assembly

Constituency details
- Country: India
- Region: North India
- State: Haryana
- Division: Gurgaon
- District: Mahendragarh
- Lok Sabha constituency: Bhiwani-Mahendragarh
- Total electors: 2,13,494
- Reservation: None

Member of Legislative Assembly
- 15th Haryana Legislative Assembly
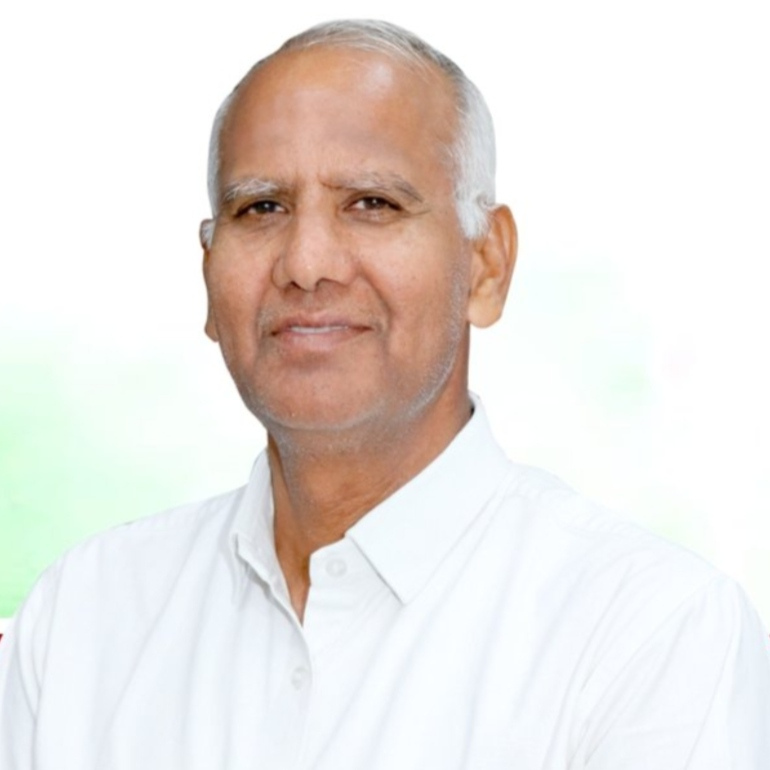
- Incumbent Rao Kanwar Singh
- Party: Bharatiya Janata Party
- Elected year: 2024

Mahendragarh Assembly constituency is one of the 90 Legislative Assembly constituencies of Haryana state in India.

It is part of Mahendragarh district.

== Members of the Legislative Assembly ==
Year	Member	Party
1967	Hari Singh	Independent
1968	Hari Singh	Vishal Haryana Party
1972	Nehal Singh	Indian National Congress
1977	Dalip Singh	Vishal Haryana Party
1982	Ram Bilas Sharma	Bharatiya Janata Party
1987	Ram Bilas Sharma	Bharatiya Janata Party
1991	Ram Bilas Sharma	Bharatiya Janata Party
1996	Ram Bilas Sharma	Bharatiya Janata Party
2000	Rao Dan Singh	Indian National Congress
2005	Rao Dan Singh	Indian National Congress
2009	Rao Dan Singh	Indian National Congress
2014	Ram Bilas Sharma	Bharatiya Janata Party
2019	Rao Dan Singh	Indian National Congress
2024	Rao Kanwar Singh	Bharatiya Janata Party

== Election results ==
=== Assembly Election 2024 ===
2024 Haryana Legislative Assembly election: Mahendragarh
Party	Candidate	Votes	%	±%
BJP	Rao Kanwar Singh	63,036	40.56	▲15.27
INC	Rao Dan Singh	60,388	38.86	▲6.43
Independent	Sandeep Singh	20,834	13.41	New
INLD	Surender Kaushik	3,933	2.53	New
AAP	Dr. Manish Yadav	1,740	1.12	New
Independent	Balwan Fauji	1,695	1.09	New
Independent	Dr. Bhup Singh Yadav	1,488	0.96	New
NOTA	None of the Above	421	0.27	New
Margin of victory		2,648	1.70	▼5.43
Turnout		1,55,401	74.00	▲0.74
Registered electors		2,13,494		▲7.33
BJP gain from INC		Swing	▲8.14	

=== Assembly Election 2019 ===
2019 Haryana Legislative Assembly election: Mahendragarh
Party	Candidate	Votes	%	±%
INC	Rao Dan Singh	46,478	32.43	▼2.79
BJP	Ram Bilas Sharma	36,258	25.30	▼34.59
Independent	Sandeep Singh Ex. SDM	33,077	23.08	New
JJP	Foji Ramesh Palri	12,118	8.45	New
Independent	Surender Kaushik	5,302	3.70	New
Rashtriya Janta Party	Rakesh Tanwar	3,435	2.40	New
Independent	Rakesh Alias Gautam Budeen	3,351	2.34	New
BSP	Dharmender	859	0.60	New
Margin of victory		10,220	7.13	▼17.54
Turnout		1,43,340	73.26	▼7.69
Registered electors		1,95,655		▲13.30
INC gain from BJP		Swing	▼27.46	

=== Assembly Election 2014 ===
2014 Haryana Legislative Assembly election: Mahendragarh
Party	Candidate	Votes	%	±%
BJP	Ram Bilas Sharma	83,724	59.89	▲27.00
INC	Dan Singh	49,233	35.22	▼2.54
INLD	Nirmala Tanwar	3,396	2.43	▼6.36
Independent	Ajay Sigriya	1,132	0.81	New
Margin of victory		34,491	24.67	▲19.80
Turnout		1,39,805	80.96	▲6.08
Registered electors		1,72,693		▲15.45
BJP gain from INC		Swing	▲22.13	

=== Assembly Election 2009 ===
2009 Haryana Legislative Assembly election: Mahendragarh
Party	Candidate	Votes	%	±%
INC	Dan Singh	42,286	37.76	▼14.28
BJP	Ram Bilas Sharma	36,833	32.89	▼0.97
Independent	Kulbir Singh	14,553	12.99	New
INLD	Ramesh Palri	9,848	8.79	▲0.47
HJC(BL)	Bhagirath Singh	3,764	3.36	New
BSP	Sukesh Diwan	1,465	1.31	▲0.57
Independent	Sanjay Kumar So Gaj Raj Singh	928	0.83	New
Independent	Hanuman Singh	617	0.55	New
SP	Mahender Singh	566	0.51	▼1.08
Margin of victory		5,453	4.87	▼13.30
Turnout		1,11,992	74.87	▲1.22
Registered electors		1,49,580		▼3.05
INC hold		Swing	▼14.28	

=== Assembly Election 2005 ===
2005 Haryana Legislative Assembly election: Mahendragarh
Party	Candidate	Votes	%	±%
INC	Dan Singh	59,128	52.04	▼14.84
BJP	Ram Bilas Sharma	38,479	33.86	▲4.93
INLD	Kanwar Singh Kalwari	9,454	8.32	New
SP	Virender	1,800	1.58	▲0.85
Independent	Satyapal	1,318	1.16	New
Independent	Sunder Lal	1,029	0.91	New
BSP	Briju Singh	836	0.74	New
Margin of victory		20,649	18.17	▼19.77
Turnout		1,13,629	73.65	▼0.09
Registered electors		1,54,280		▲11.12
INC hold		Swing	▼14.84	

=== Assembly Election 2000 ===
2000 Haryana Legislative Assembly election: Mahendragarh
Party	Candidate	Votes	%	±%
INC	Dan Singh	68,472	66.88	▲53.11
BJP	Ram Bilas Sharma	29,622	28.93	▲8.10
HVP	Madan Singh Shekhawat	789	0.77	New
SP	Narender	756	0.74	New
JD(U)	Om Prakash	663	0.65	New
Independent	Hanuman Yadav	548	0.54	New
Margin of victory		38,850	37.95	▲33.88
Turnout		1,02,380	73.83	▲6.84
Registered electors		1,38,840		▲1.78
INC gain from BJP		Swing	▲46.05	

=== Assembly Election 1996 ===
1996 Haryana Legislative Assembly election: Mahendragarh
Party	Candidate	Votes	%	±%
BJP	Ram Bilas Sharma	19,015	20.84	▼5.59
Independent	Dan Singh	15,307	16.77	New
INC	Ram Singh	12,564	13.77	▼3.03
Independent	Rohtash Singh	10,504	11.51	New
Independent	Bhana Ram	7,163	7.85	New
Independent	Anup Yadav	6,905	7.57	New
Independent	Dalip Singh	5,283	5.79	New
BSP	Siri Chand	3,433	3.76	New
SAP	Chhailu Ram	2,135	2.34	New
Independent	Sahi Ram	1,329	1.46	New
Independent	Laxmi Narain	919	1.01	New
Margin of victory		3,708	4.06	▲1.68
Turnout		91,264	70.00	▲9.40
Registered electors		1,36,416		▲14.89
BJP hold		Swing	▼5.59	

=== Assembly Election 1991 ===
1991 Haryana Legislative Assembly election: Mahendragarh
Party	Candidate	Votes	%	±%
BJP	Ram Bilas Sharma	18,039	26.42	▼31.44
HVP	Dalip Singh	16,413	24.04	New
INC	Kuldeep Yadav	11,465	16.79	▼5.39
JP	Raohtas Singh S/O Moti Singh	10,401	15.23	New
Sarvajati Janta Panchayat	Raghu Yadav	4,580	6.71	New
Independent	Om Parkash	2,682	3.93	New
LKD	Balbir Singh S/O Mamraj	879	1.29	New
Doordarshi Party	Rohtash Singh S/O Umraoo Singh	486	0.71	New
Independent	Phool Singh	386	0.57	New
Margin of victory		1,626	2.38	▼33.31
Turnout		68,271	60.65	▼13.81
Registered electors		1,18,735		▲10.15
BJP hold		Swing	▼31.44	

=== Assembly Election 1987 ===
1987 Haryana Legislative Assembly election: Mahendragarh
Party	Candidate	Votes	%	±%
BJP	Ram Bilas Sharma	44,481	57.87	▲7.41
INC	Hari Singh	17,049	22.18	▼15.91
Independent	Dalip Singh	13,156	17.12	New
Independent	Madansingh	1,297	1.69	New
Independent	Mahabir	398	0.52	New
Margin of victory		27,432	35.69	▲23.31
Turnout		76,868	72.37	▼1.30
Registered electors		1,07,793		▲15.82
BJP hold		Swing	▲7.41	

=== Assembly Election 1982 ===
1982 Haryana Legislative Assembly election: Mahendragarh
Party	Candidate	Votes	%	±%
BJP	Ram Bilas Sharma	34,096	50.46	New
INC	Dalip Singh	25,735	38.08	▲34.30
Independent	Hari Singh	4,918	7.28	New
JP	Paras Ram	866	1.28	▼42.74
Independent	Jai Narain	589	0.87	New
Independent	Lakhan Lal	470	0.70	New
Independent	Rajinder	361	0.53	New
Margin of victory		8,361	12.37	▲8.23
Turnout		67,573	74.01	▲5.09
Registered electors		93,068		▲20.62
BJP gain from VHP		Swing	▲2.29	

=== Assembly Election 1977 ===
1977 Haryana Legislative Assembly election: Mahendragarh
Party	Candidate	Votes	%	±%
VHP	Dalip Singh	25,091	48.17	▲14.44
JP	Ram Bilas Sharma	22,933	44.02	New
INC	Bishamber Dayal	1,969	3.78	▼60.73
Independent	Kanwar Singh	1,423	2.73	New
Independent	Tej Singh	470	0.90	New
Margin of victory		2,158	4.14	▼26.64
Turnout		52,093	68.90	▼2.09
Registered electors		77,158		▲25.42
VHP gain from INC		Swing	▼16.34	

=== Assembly Election 1972 ===
1972 Haryana Legislative Assembly election: Mahendragarh
Party	Candidate	Votes	%	±%
INC	Nehal Singh	27,622	64.51	▲40.80
VHP	Hari Singh	14,440	33.72	▼6.54
Independent	Jewana	757	1.77	New
Margin of victory		13,182	30.79	▲14.23
Turnout		42,819	71.18	▲18.48
Registered electors		61,520		▲12.60
INC gain from VHP		Swing		

=== Assembly Election 1968 ===
1968 Haryana Legislative Assembly election: Mahendragarh
Party	Candidate	Votes	%	±%
VHP	Hari Singh	11,246	40.26	New
INC	Narinder Singh	6,623	23.71	▼2.03
Independent	Nihal Singh	6,448	23.08	New
ABJS	Bansi Lal	2,998	10.73	▼2.12
Independent	Har Lal	617	2.21	New
Margin of victory		4,623	16.55	▲13.75
Turnout		27,932	53.19	▼10.70
Registered electors		54,637		▲2.64
VHP gain from Independent		Swing	▲11.22	

=== Assembly Election 1967 ===
1967 Haryana Legislative Assembly election: Mahendragarh
Party	Candidate	Votes	%	±%
Independent	Hari Singh	9,558	29.05	New
Independent	R. Singh	8,636	26.24	New
INC	M. Singh	8,472	25.75	New
ABJS	R. Gopal	4,229	12.85	New
Independent	H. Ram	2,012	6.11	New
Margin of victory		922	2.80	
Turnout		32,907	65.38	
Registered electors		53,230		
Independent win (new seat)				

== See also ==
- List of constituencies of the Haryana Legislative Assembly
- Mahendragarh district
