= Narnaund Assembly constituency =

Coordinates: 29.38°N 75.92°E

- Constituency No. 49 for the Haryana Legislative Assembly

Constituency details
- Country: India
- Region: North India
- State: Haryana
- District: Hisar
- Lok Sabha constituency: Hisar
- Established: 1967
- Total electors: 2,15,286
- Reservation: None

Member of Legislative Assembly
- 15th Haryana Legislative Assembly
- Incumbent Jassi Petwar
- Party: INC
- Elected year: 2024

Narnaund Assembly constituency is one of the 90 Vidhan Sabha constituencies of Haryana state in northern India.

== Overview ==
It is part of Hisar Lok Sabha constituency.

== Members of the Legislative Assembly ==
Year	Member	Party
1967	Rameshwar Dutt	Indian National Congress
1968	Joginder Singh	Swatantra Party
1972	Joginder Singh	Indian National Congress
1977	Ch. Virender Singh	Janata Party
1982	Ch. Virender Singh	Lokdal
1987	Ch. Virender Singh	Lokdal
1991	Ch. Virender Singh	Janata Dal
1996	Jaswant Singh	Haryana Vikas Party
2000	Ram Bhagat	Independent
2005	Ram Kumar Gautam	Bharatiya Janata Party
2009	Saroj Mor	Indian National Lok Dal
2014	Abhimanyu Singh Sindhu	Bharatiya Janata Party
2019	Ram Kumar Gautam	Jannayak Janta Party
2024	Jassi Petwar	Indian National Congress

== Election results ==
=== Assembly Election 2024 ===
2024 Haryana Legislative Assembly election: Narnaund
Party	Candidate	Votes	%	±%
INC	Jassi Petwar	84,801	51.37%	▲45.99
BJP	Abhimanyu Singh Sindhu	72,223	43.75%	▲3.71
INLD	Umed Singh Lohan	4,628	2.80%	▼0.20
AAP	Ranbir Singh Lohan	1,057	0.64%	New
NOTA	None of the Above	550	0.33%	New
Margin of victory		12,578	7.62%	▼0.23
Turnout		1,65,080	76.84%	▼0.47
Registered electors		2,15,286		▲8.31
INC gain from JJP		Swing	▲3.48	

=== Assembly Election 2019 ===
2019 Haryana Legislative Assembly election: Narnaund
Party	Candidate	Votes	%	±%
JJP	Ram Kumar Gautam	73,435	47.89	New
BJP	Captain Abhimanyu	61,406	40.04	▲5.40
INC	Baljeet Sihag	8,245	5.38	▼1.85
INLD	Jassi Petwar	4,599	3.00	▼27.94
BSP	Mahender Singh	2,208	1.44	▲0.21
Margin of victory		12,029	7.84	▲4.13
Turnout		1,53,344	77.31	▼5.87
Registered electors		1,98,349		▲6.31
JJP gain from BJP		Swing	▲13.24	

=== Assembly Election 2014 ===
2014 Haryana Legislative Assembly election: Narnaund
Party	Candidate	Votes	%	±%
BJP	Captain Abhimanyu	53,770	34.65%	▲5.29
INLD	Raj Singh Mor	48,009	30.94%	▼6.45
Independent	Ram Kumar Gautam	34,756	22.40%	New
INC	Rajbir Sandhu	11,213	7.23%	▼22.34
BSP	Surender Panghal	1912	1.23%	▼0.51
Margin of victory		5,761	3.71%	▼4.10
Turnout		1,55,191	83.18%	▲2.78
Registered electors		1,86,568		▲16.03
BJP gain from INLD		Swing	▼2.73	

=== Assembly Election 2009 ===
2009 Haryana Legislative Assembly election: Narnaund
Party	Candidate	Votes	%	±%
INLD	Saroj Mor	48,322	37.38%	▲4.84
INC	Ram Kumar Gautam	38,225	29.57%	▼1.1
BJP	Abhimanyu	37,949	29.36%	▼4.72
BSP	Bhal Singh	2,252	1.74%	▲1.08
Independent	Roopender Rana	975	0.75%	New
Margin of victory		10,097	7.81%	▲6.28
Turnout		1,29,270	80.40%	▲1.72
Registered electors		1,60,787		▲38.45
INLD gain from BJP		Swing	▲3.31	

=== Assembly Election 2005 ===
2005 Haryana Legislative Assembly election: Narnaund
Party	Candidate	Votes	%	±%
BJP	Ram Kumar Gautam	31,132	34.07%	▲14.67
INLD	Saroj	29,733	32.54%	New
INC	Ajay Chaudhry	28,025	30.67%	▼6.78
Independent	Sanjay	650	0.71%	New
BSP	Suresh	606	0.66%	▲0.14
Margin of victory		1,399	1.53%	▼2.05
Turnout		91,368	78.68%	▲2.73
Registered electors		1,16,132		▲13.87
BJP gain from Independent		Swing	▼6.96	

=== Assembly Election 2000 ===
2000 Haryana Legislative Assembly election: Narnaund
Party	Candidate	Votes	%	±%
Independent	Ram Bhagat S/O Dhan Singh	31,786	41.03%	New
INC	Virender Singh S/O Diwan	29,013	37.45%	▲10.48
BJP	Ram Kumar Gautam	15,027	19.40%	New
BSP	Ram Niwas	407	0.53%	▼3.79
Margin of victory		2,773	3.58%	▼10.48
Turnout		77,461	76.53%	▲2.01
Registered electors		1,01,989		▼1.55
Independent gain from HVP		Swing	▼0.01	

=== Assembly Election 1996 ===
1996 Haryana Legislative Assembly election: Narnaund
Party	Candidate	Votes	%	±%
HVP	Jaswant Singh	31,439	41.04%	New
INC	Virender Singh S/O Diwan Singh	20,666	26.98%	▼5.05
SAP	Ram Dass	14,717	19.21%	New
BSP	Virender Singh S/O Sajjan Singh	3,308	4.32%	New
Independent	Rajinder	1,407	1.84%	New
Independent	Rajbir	1,237	1.61%	New
Independent	Ram Avtar	764	1.00%	New
Independent	Sher Singh	497	0.65%	New
AIIC(T)	Jaibir Singh	428	0.56%	New
Margin of victory		10,773	14.06%	▲14.00
Turnout		76,602	76.25%	▲8.41
Registered electors		1,03,595		▲8.87
HVP gain from JD		Swing	▲8.95	

=== Assembly Election 1991 ===
1991 Haryana Legislative Assembly election: Narnaund
Party	Candidate	Votes	%	±%
JD	Virender Singh	20,011	32.09%	New
INC	Jaswant Singh	19,973	32.03%	▲3.25
JP	Karm Singh	18,258	29.28%	New
BJP	Azad Singh	1,505	2.41%	New
Independent	Cander Bhan	797	1.28%	New
Independent	Ranbir Singh	712	1.14%	New
Independent	Vazir Singh	423	0.68%	New
Margin of victory		38	0.06%	▼40.12
Turnout		62,356	68.07%	▼10.27
Registered electors		95,155		▲9.37
JD gain from LKD		Swing	▼36.86	

=== Assembly Election 1987 ===
1987 Haryana Legislative Assembly election: Narnaund
Party	Candidate	Votes	%	±%
LKD	Virender Singh	45,476	68.95%	▲24.56
INC	Sarup Singh	18,978	28.78%	▼1.14
Independent	Ram Kishan	852	1.29%	New
Independent	Ram Kuwar	645	0.98%	New
Margin of victory		26,498	40.18%	▲25.70
Turnout		65,951	76.77%	▲2.63
Registered electors		87,000		▲15.05
LKD hold		Swing	▲24.56	

=== Assembly Election 1982 ===
1982 Haryana Legislative Assembly election: Narnaund
Party	Candidate	Votes	%	±%
LKD	Virender Singh	24,564	44.39%	New
INC	Sarup Singh	16,552	29.91%	▲7.48
Independent	Ram Kumar	7,049	12.74%	New
Independent	Jaswant Singh	4,539	8.20%	New
JP	Ram Bilas	889	1.61%	▼56.93
Independent	Mani Ram	602	1.09%	New
Independent	Partap	529	0.96%	New
Independent	Ishwar Singh	352	0.64%	New
Margin of victory		8,012	14.48%	▼21.63
Turnout		55,334	74.72%	▲5.39
Registered electors		75,618		▲17.76
LKD gain from JP		Swing	▼14.15	

=== Assembly Election 1977 ===
1977 Haryana Legislative Assembly election: Narnaund
Party	Candidate	Votes	%	±%
JP	Virender Singh	25,481	58.54%	New
INC	Saroop Singh	9,763	22.43%	▼25.46
Independent	Ram Kumar	7,791	17.90%	New
Independent	Jogiram	344	0.79%	New
Margin of victory		15,718	36.11%	▲29.23
Turnout		43,529	68.57%	▼4.56
Registered electors		64,213		▲8.61
JP gain from INC		Swing	▲10.65	

=== Assembly Election 1972 ===
1972 Haryana Legislative Assembly election: Narnaund
Party	Candidate	Votes	%	±%
INC	Joginder Singh	20,484	47.89%	▲18.63
Akhil Bhartiya Arya Sabha	Virender Singh	17,543	41.01%	New
Independent	Ram Bhagat	2,059	4.81%	New
Independent	Chattar Singh	1,851	4.33%	New
Independent	Randhir Singh	438	1.02%	New
HM	Jai Gopal	400	0.94%	New
Margin of victory		2,941	6.88%	▼17.06
Turnout		42,775	74.04%	▲21.40
Registered electors		59,123		▲7.03
INC gain from SWA		Swing	▼5.31	

=== Assembly Election 1968 ===
1968 Haryana Legislative Assembly election: Narnaund
Party	Candidate	Votes	%	±%
SWA	Joginder Singh	14,973	53.19%	New
INC	Rameshwar Dutt	8,235	29.26%	▼5.77
Independent	Jamna Singh	2,224	7.90%	New
ABJS	Parkash Chander	1,196	4.25%	▼11.29
SSP	Brahma Nand	857	3.04%	▼8.92
Independent	Jogiram	407	1.45%	New
Independent	Ratti Ram	219	0.78%	New
Independent	Risal Singh	37	0.13%	New
Margin of victory		6,738	23.94%	▲16.04
Turnout		28,148	51.93%	▼19.89
Registered electors		55,242		▲2.17
SWA gain from INC		Swing	▲18.16	

=== Assembly Election 1967 ===
1967 Haryana Legislative Assembly election: Narnaund
Party	Candidate	Votes	%	±%
INC	R. Datt	13,417	35.03%	New
Independent	J. Singh	10,391	27.13%	New
ABJS	V. Singh	5,952	15.54%	New
SSP	B. Nand	4,581	11.96%	New
Independent	H. Singh	1,402	3.66%	New
Independent	L. Singh	1,402	3.66%	New
CPI(M)	B. Singh	746	1.95%	New
Independent	R. Singh	411	1.07%	New
Margin of victory		3,026	7.90%	
Turnout		38,302	74.96%	
Registered electors		54,069		
INC win (new seat)				

== See also ==
- Haryana Legislative Assembly
- Elections in Haryana
- Elections in India
- Lok Sabha
- Rajya Sabha
- Election Commission of India
