= Kanwar Singh Yadav =

Indian politician

Rao Kanwar Singh
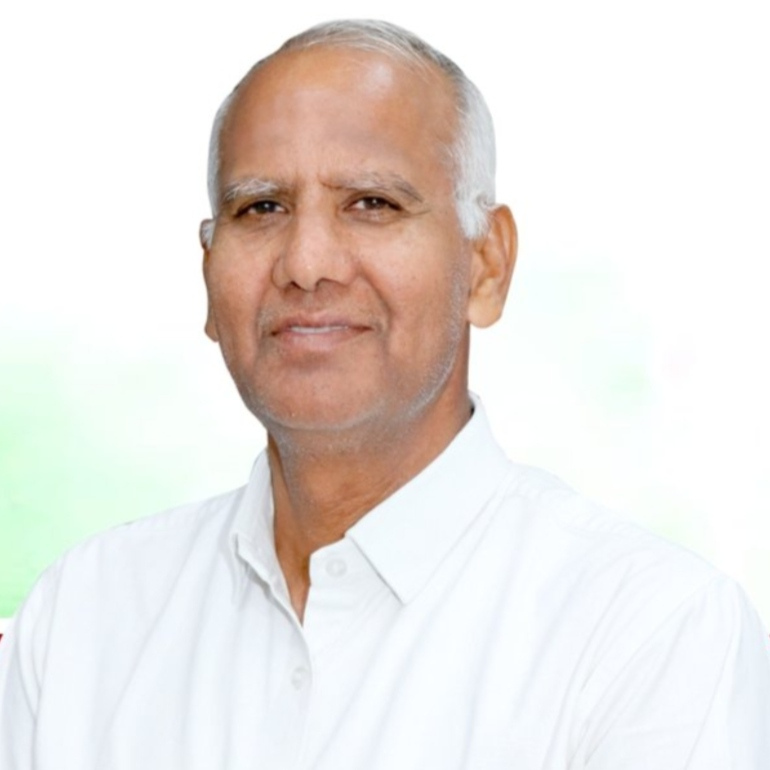

MLA Government of Haryana

Member of Haryana Legislative Assembly
- Constituency: Mahendragarh

Personal details
- Born: 15 March 1960 (age 66) Khatod, India
- Party: Bharatiya Janata Party
- Education: Awdesh partap singh University Rewa, M.P.
- Occupation: Social worker

Kanwar Singh Yadav is an Indian politician. He was elected to the Haryana Legislative Assembly from Mahendragarh Assembly constituency in the 2024 Haryana Legislative Assembly election as a member of the Bharatiya Janata Party.

== Personal life ==
Kanwar Singh was born in Khatod village on 15 March 1960. He has a son named Rahul.

== Career graph ==
- 2024 – MLA (Mahendragarh constituency)

== Early life and education ==
Kanwar Singh was born in the village of Khatod, located in Mahendergarh district, Haryana. Growing up in a rural environment, he developed a strong bond with the local community from an early age. He completed his early education in his hometown before pursuing higher studies. In 1986, he graduated with a master's degree in Economics from Awdhesh Pratap Singh University in Rewa, Madhya Pradesh. During his college years, he was actively involved in student organizations, laying the foundation for his future in politics.Kanwar Singh began his journey as a member of the Akhil Bharatiya Vidyarthi Parishad (ABVP) in 1986, demonstrating his interest in social and political issues from a young age. He was also involved with the Rashtriya Swayamsevak Sangh (RSS), which influenced his dedication to serving the nation and supporting traditional values. His early political affiliations set the stage for a career marked by commitment to his constituents and the development of his community. From 2017 to 2023, he served as the Chairman of the Haryana Cooperative Bank, where he played a key role in enhancing the state's cooperative banking system. His leadership in this role highlighted his focus on economic empowerment and his ability to connect with the grassroots, further strengthening his rapport with local communities. He contested against congress stalwart from mahendergarh, Rao Dan Singh, and won by 3000 votes. Known for his straightforward and relatable approach, Singh has become a trusted figure in the region, with a reputation for being approachable and deeply invested in the welfare of his constituents. In political circle Kanwar Singh is said to be close to ex-CM Manohar Lal Khattar.

== Personality and public image ==
Kanwar Singh is regarded as a humble and approachable leader, maintaining a strong connection with the residents of Mahendergarh. His personality and commitment to addressing local issues have earned him the admiration and trust of his constituents. Singh is often praised for his dedication to public service and his efforts to improve the lives of the people he represents.
