= Haryana Power Generation Corporation =

Power company in India

HPGCL
- हरियाणा विद्युत उत्पादन निगम लिमिटेड
- HPGCL Logo

Public Sector Undertaking overview
- Formed: 17 March 1997
- Type: Electricity
- Headquarters: Panchkula, Haryana, India
- Public Sector Undertaking executives: Shri Sanjeev Kaushal Retd.IAS, Chairman; Ashok Kumar Meena IAS, Managing Director
- Website: hpgcl.org.in

Haryana Power Generation Corporation Limited (HPGCL) (Hindi: हरियाणा विद्युत उत्पादन निगम लिमिटेड) is the electricity generating company of the Government of Haryana in India. It has been entrusted with the responsibility of setting up of new generating stations in state of Haryana. HPGCL is an ISO: 9001, ISO:14001 and OHSAS:18001 Certified company. The certification was awarded by M/s British Standards Institution (BSI). Currently it has six power stations and projects situated at Panipat, Yamuna Nagar, Hissar & Jhajjar districts.

== History ==
HPGCL was incorporated as company on 17 March 1997 and was given the responsibility of operating and maintenance of State's own generating projects. The business of Generation of power of erstwhile HSEB was transferred to HPGCL on 14.08.98 pursuant to power reforms in Haryana. As a result, HPGCL came in existence on 14.08.98 for bringing in excellence in power generation in the states own Generating stations. In addition, it has been entrusted with the responsibility of setting up of new power plants.

== Generation capacity ==
The installed capacity of HPGCL as on 1 July 2016 is 4850.50 MW from Coal based Thermal and Hydro power plants.

Name	Date of Commissioning	No. of Units	Capacity
Panipat Thermal Power Station I, Khukhrana Panipat	1979 November	4	440 MW (now decommissioned)
Panipat Thermal Power Station II, Khukhrana Panipat	1989 March	4	710 MW after unit 5 of 210 MW capacity was decommissioned (2x250+210 MW)
Deen Bandhu Chhotu Ram Thermal Power Project, Yamuna Nagar	14.04.2008	2	600 MW
Rajiv Gandhi Thermal Power Station, Khedar, Hissar	24.08.2010	2	1200 MW
Indira Gandhi Super Thermal Power Project, APCPL Jhajjar	26.04.2013	3	1500 MW
WYC Hydro Electric Station, Yamuna Nagar	29.05.1986	8	62.40 MW

== Achievements ==
- 2×300 MW DCRTPP Yamuna Nagar commissioned in record time. First Unit was commissioned in a record period of 27 months which is the lowest for any coal based green field project in the Country.
- Work of 2×600 MW RGTPP Hisar, the first mega project in Northern Region – progressing on fast track towards commissioning in 2009-10. The boiler hydraulic test of Unit-1 completed successfully on 1 March 2009 within 25 months which is a record for fastest hydraulic test in the Country.
- 2×660 MW power project at Jhajjar awarded to IPP- First power generation project in Haryana based on Super Critical Technology
- Central Electricity Authority, New Delhi selected 250 MW Unit-8 of PTPS, Panipat for the award of Best Executed 250 MW Thermal Power Project of Year 2004-05.
- The Ministry of Power, Govt. of India awarded Meritorious Productivity award to PTPS for good performance during the year 2003-04 as the power station achieved highest ever PLF of 78.75% during the year.

== Plans ==
Faridabad Solar Power Plant is set up by (HPGCL) at the site of defunct Faridabad Thermal Power Station in Faridabad. The power generator plans to set up the plant over 151.78 acres near Bata Chowk in the district that generated coal based energy in the past.

== See also ==
- Divisions of Haryana
