= Jassi Petwar =

Indian politician

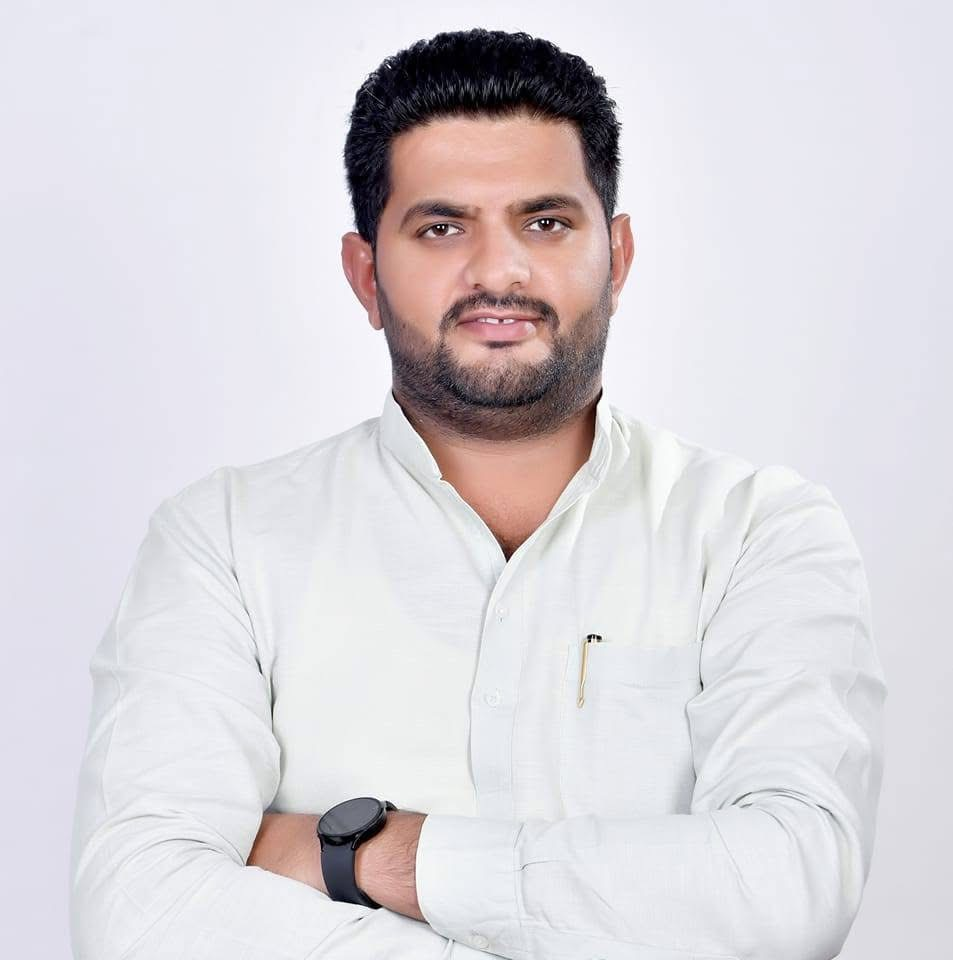

Member of Haryana Legislative Assembly
- Incumbent
- Assumed office 8 October 2024
- Preceded by: Ram Kumar Gautam
- Constituency: Narnaund

Personal details
- Party: Indian National Congress
- Other political affiliations: Indian National Lok Dal
- Profession: Politician

Jassi Petwar is an Indian politician from Haryana. He is a Member of the Haryana Legislative Assembly from 2024, representing Narnaund Assembly constituency as a Member of the Indian National Congress (INC) party.

== Early life ==
He is from Petwar village of Hisar district. His father is Satvir. He studied Bachelor of Arts from Maharshi Dayanand University (MDU).

== Political career ==
He started as a politician with Indian National Lok Dal (INLD) in Haryana where he was the state president of party's youth wing. During 2019 Haryana Legislative Assembly election, he contested on INLD ticket and lost the election against Captain Abhimanyu Singh Sindhu.

In January 2020, he switched to INC. During 2024 Haryana Legislative Assembly election, he won on INC ticket from Narnaund Assembly constituency.

== See also ==
- Politics of Haryana
