= Giri River =

River in India

Coordinates: 30°27′N 77°40′E

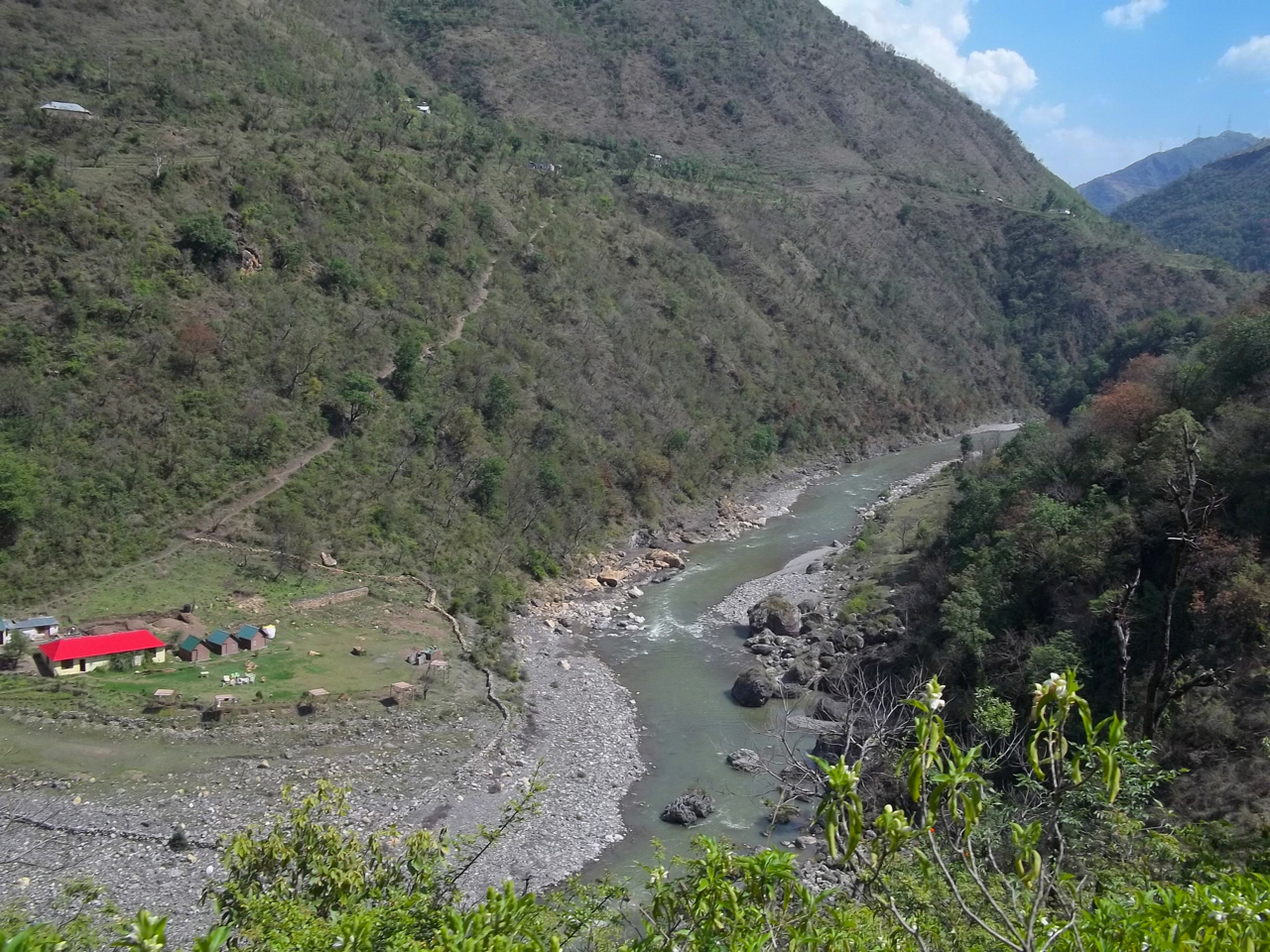
Giri River passing through Sirmaur district

Giri River is a tributary of the Yamuna river that flows in the state of Himachal Pradesh in India.

== Dams ==
The Renuka Ji Dam Hydroelectricity Power Project is a 40 MW, Rs. 6,947 crore (Rs. 69,470,000,000) project of which 90% is funded by the Central Government, is an under-construction 148-metre-high gravity dam with 24 km lake holding 498 million cubic metres of water. The 148-metre-high dam will create a reservoir spanning 24 km and store 498 million cubic metres of water. Haryana, Himachal Pradesh, Uttar Pradesh, Uttarakhand, Rajasthan, and Delhi are the stakeholder states. After much delays, it was expedited in 2021 by Prime Minister Narendra Modi with an expected completion date of 2030.

== See also ==
- Dams on Yamuna river
  - Lakhwar-Vyasi project, under-construction
  - Kishau Dam, under-construction on Tons river tributary of Yamuna with 2028 expected completion
