= Department of Revenue and Disaster Management, Haryana =

Government department of Haryana, India

Government of Haryana Department of Revenue and Disaster Management, Haryana

Agency overview
- Jurisdiction: Government of Haryana
- Headquarters: Haryana Civil Secretariat, Sector-17, Chandigarh; 30°45′40″N 76°48′2″E
- Agency executive: Dushyant Chautala, Deputy Chief Minister
- Website: http://revenueharyana.gov.in/

Department of Revenue and Disaster Management, Haryana is a Ministry and department of the government of Haryana in India.

== Description ==
This department came into existence when Haryana was established as a new state within India after being separated from Punjab. Dushyant Chautala is the minister responsible for this department from November 2019.

The department is organised in six divisions, 22 districts, 71 sub-divisions, 93 Tehsils and 49 Sub-Tehsils, 256 Kanungo circles, 2691 Patwar circles and 7088 revenue circles corresponding to villages. The department is responsible for disaster management, revenue collection, and administration of the Unique Identification (UID).

Address – New Secretariat Haryana, Sector-17, Chandigarh

== See also ==
- Government of Haryana
