= Indian states ranking by underweight people =

This is a list of the States of India ranked in order of percentage of people having a Body Mass Index lower than normal. The information is based on the Demographic & Health Survey of 2005–06 for India.

== People with low Body Mass Index (BMI) ==
States	Males (%)	Males Rank	Females (%)	Females Rank
Tripura	36.3	1	32.1	8
Madhya Pradesh	34.3	2	38.1	5
Rajasthan	31.8	3	31.6	10
Assam	31.4	4	34.5	7
Jharkhand	31.4	4	40.6	2
Uttar Pradesh	30.7	6	32.1	9
Odisha	30.1	7	38.5	4
Chhattisgarh	29.8	8	39	3
Arunachal Pradesh	29.6	9	35.7	6
Bihar	26.7	10	41	1
Gujarat	26.2	11	30.3	12
Whole India	26.1	—	31	—
Haryana	24.8	12	25.8	15
Karnataka	23.5	13	29.4	13
Maharashtra	22.9	14	30.6	11
Andhra Pradesh	22.8	15	28.8	14
Uttarakhand	19.8	16	23.7	16
Jammu and Kashmir	17.9	17	19.3	19
Himachal Pradesh	17.8	18	22.3	17
Tamil Nadu	16.5	19	21.5	18
Goa	14.8	20	18.5	20
West Bengal	11.6	21	13.5	22
Manipur	10.2	22	11.9	24
Kerala	9.9	23	10.5	26
Nagaland	8.8	24	13.9	21
Meghalaya	6	25	11.7	25
Sikkim	5.2	26	7.6	27
Mizoram	4	27	13.3	23
Punjab	2.2	28	2.0	28

== See also ==
- Indian states ranking by overweight people
