= Haryana Board of School Education =

State secondary education board of India

- Logo
- Abbreviation: HBSE (BSEH)
- Formation: 1969
- Type: Government Board of Education
- Headquarters: Bhiwani, Haryana
- Location: Hansi Road, Bhiwani, Haryana 127021
- Official language: Hindi, English
- Chairman: Dr. Pawan Kumar
- Parent organisation: Department of School Education, Haryana of Government of Haryana
- Website: bseh.org.in

Haryana Board of School Education (HBSE), established in 1969 is the authority which conducts the Public Examinations at Middle, Matric (Secondary or High School) and Senior Secondary School (Academic & Vocational) levels annually in the Indian state of Haryana through affiliated schools.

== History ==
- In 1969, the Haryana Board of School Education was established at Chandigarh. The Board started working with a staff of 100 officials allocated from Punjab University, Chandigarh.
- In 1970, HBSE conducted its first examination of Matric-level.
- In 1976, started conducting Middle school leaving examination (8th class).
- In 1981, was shifted to Bhiwani. In year 1987, Board started conducting 10+2 examination and later in 1990 also started conducting vocational examination.
- In 1987, adopted 10+2 pattern of education and conducted XII class examination under the new scheme.
- In 1990, started conducting 10+2 Vocational Education examination.
- In 1994, established Haryana Open School to increase its reach.
- In 2006, adopted the semester system from session 2006–2007. It is the first Educational Board in India to do so and also the first Board to introduce relative grading, CCE (Continuous and Comprehensive Evaluation) in all board classes i.e. Middle, Matric (Secondary or High School) and Senior Secondary School (Higher Secondary).

== Affiliation ==
HBSE is ISO 9001: 2008 organisation owned by the Department of School Education, Haryana of Government of Haryana. All the government schools of Department of School Education, Haryana of Government of Haryana are affiliated with HBSE. HBSE also grants affiliation to all those private institutions who are permanently/temporary recognised by the Department of School Education, Haryana upon the payment of prescribed fees to the Board.

== Examination ==
The Haryana Board conducts the annual examinations for Class 8th, 10th and 12th in the month of March. The board earlier conducted exams twice in a year i.e. First Semester in September and Second Semester in March. The results are declared in month of May. BSEH also conducts Diploma in Education (D.Ed.) 2 year course every year. Apart from these tests, HBSE also conducts the Haryana Teacher Eligibility Test (HTET) time to time for candidates to be eligible for teacher. The integral part of the HBSE, Haryana Open School (HOS) conducts on demand examination, annual and supplementary examinations at secondary and senior secondary levels. The main aim of HOS to provide education to all those who are beyond the reach of formal education due to any social, financial and other reasons.

== See also ==
- Department of School Education, Haryana
- Department of Elementary Education, Haryana
- Department of Higher Education, Haryana
- Government of Haryana
