= Department of Higher Education (Haryana) =

Government unit in Haryana, India

Government of the Department of Higher Education, Haryana (उच्च शिक्षा विभाग, हरियाणा)
Legislative branch
- Assembly: Haryana Vidhan Sabha

The Department of Higher Education, Haryana (Hindi: उच्च शिक्षा विभाग, हरियाणा) is a unit of the government of Haryana in India that looks after college education in Haryana.

== History ==
In 1966, when Haryana was carved out of Punjab, there arose a need of a separate department of education. So, in 1966, a separate Department of Higher Education was established for Haryana.

== Introduction ==
The department is responsible for hiring and employing the assistant/associate professors for the government colleges of the Government of Haryana.

== See also ==
- List of institutions of higher education in Haryana
- Rajiv Gandhi Education City, Sonipat
- Department of Elementary Education, Haryana Official website
- Director Secondary Education, Haryana Official website
- Department of School Education, Haryana Official website
- Haryana Board of School Education Official website
- State Counselling Board (SCB), Haryana for admission to the technical courses Official website
- Overseas Placement Assistance Society (OPAS), Haryana
- Haryana Tourism
- Haryana Roadways
