= Naugaja Peer =

Indian saint

Main Gate Naugaja Peer/Naudara Shiv Mandir

Shiv Temple At Naudara/Nau-gaja

Peer Naugaja Jee

Naugaja Peer (Punjabi: ਨੌਂਗਜਾ ਪੀਰ) was a sufi saint revered in the Punjab region. His actually name is Syed Ibrahim Badshah or Syed Mohammad Ebrahim. He is believed to ensure safe journeys and completion of all works for pilgrims in time, so he is also affectionately called Ghari Wale Baba or Highway Peer . He is called 9 "gaj" which in Indian metric units equals 8 meters and 36 inches or 27 feet. In his dargah in Haryana, clocks are offered by devotees.

There are many shrines of Naugaja Peer in the Punjab region which form part of Punjabi folk religion. The shrine is regularly visited by passers by and from people from the Punjab region.

== History ==
Baba Naugaja Peer was originally from Iraq and stayed in Kalyana village in Haryana near Shahabad Markanda, Kurukshetra. Naugaja Peer's shrine (30.0936126N 77.809875E) is situated on National Highway-1 in India near the Punjab-Haryana border. A notable feature of the shrine is it houses a Muslim saint's tomb and a Hindu Shiva temple. People go to both places and ask for their wishes.

Baba Naugaja Peer lived in Shahbad district of Haryana. There is a historic bridge called Naudara (nine lane bridge) near his tomb which is a declared tourism site by the Haryana government.

Lord Sheshnag is said to have once appeared at the site of Naugaja Peer. During 1881, Baba Tara Singh Ji was the head of the shrine who descended into Samadhi in 1911. In 1954 Mata Sharda Devi headed the shrine who descended into Samadhi in 2008. The Peer Shrine was renovated with brick walls during 1933-34 by a British officer. Vinay Shukla is in charge of maintenance since 1984.

== Worship ==
The shrine is venerated for safe journeys. Besides chaddar (cloth) and incense sticks, devotees offer wall clocks and watches, which are considered as a sign of good luck at the tomb of Naugaja peer.

Many politicians and passengers offer prayer at this holy place. This is also often visited by taxi drivers from north and south India.

Dogs and cows enjoy their daily food consisting of milk and wheat. Plus, as a routine, sparrows get grains from devotees. It is believed that people who come for worship wholeheartedly get what they want.

== Hindu mythology ==
This place was called 9 lane way (Naudara) (named after nine devis) and was situated in front of a Shiv temple where later the Muslim saint came and stayed. The Naudari is used as a bridge.

The shrine represents the folk religion of the region which is a discourse between organised religions.

== Shrines ==
A Naugaja Peer pilgrim centre is located in Saharanpur in Uttar Pradesh located on National Highway 73 which connects Roorkee in Uttarakhand to Panchkula in Haryana. Both Hindus and Muslims visit this place.

Numerous legends and myths are associated with this peer. One such version is that during the period of Musa Ale Salam, the height of a man used to be around 26 ft and these mazars have been built around that time.
