= Department of School Education, Haryana =

Department of an Indian state

Government of Haryana
Legislative branch
- Assembly: Haryana Vidhan Sabha

Department of School Education, Haryana (Hindi: विधालय शिक्षा विभाग, हरियाणा) is a unit of the government of Haryana in India that looks after the school education in the state of Haryana.

The department is responsible for hiring and employing the school teachers for the Government schools of Government of Haryana. It also runs the Haryana Board of School Education that conducts the school leaving examinations.

== History ==
The department was established in 1966, when Haryana state was carved out of Punjab.

== Status of school education ==
The 2018 Annual Survey of Education Report (ASER), released in January 2019, found that Haryana had 55.3% of the children living in rural Haryana were going to private schools in 2018 as compared to 55.8% in 2016, 6.8% girls in the 15-16 age group and 2.3% in the 11-14 age group were not enrolled in any school in the rural areas of the state, 58% children from Classes 3 to 5 were able to read the Class 2-level text, 84% in Haryana had a playground inside the school premises and playground was accessible in more than 90% of schools in Haryan. There were 15,998 government schools with primary sections in the state While 9,177 of the total were primary schools, 6,821 were upper primary schools, which represented an increase of almost 13.6% over the number of upper primary schools

== See also ==
- List of institutions of higher education in Haryana
- Rajiv Gandhi Education City, Sonipat
- Department of Elementary Education, Haryana
- Director Secondary Education, Haryana
- Department of Higher Education, Haryana
- Haryana Board of School Education
