= Department of Elementary Education, Haryana =

State governmental education department

Department of Elementary Education, Haryana (प्राथमिक शिक्षा विभाग, हरियाणा)
Agency overview
- Jurisdiction: Government of Haryana
- Website: harprathmik.gov.in

Department of Elementary Education, Haryana (Hindi: प्राथमिक शिक्षा विभाग, हरियाणा) is a unit of the government of Haryana in India that looks after the school education in the state of Haryana.

== History ==
In 1966, when Haryana state was carved out of Punjab there arose a need of separate department of Elementary Education. So, in 1966, a separate Department of Elementary Education was established for Haryana.

== Description ==
The department is responsible for hiring and employing the Elementary school teachers for the Government Elementary schools of Government of Haryana. The department also runs the Haryana Board of School Education that conducts the school leaving examinations.

== See also ==
- Director Secondary Education, Haryana
- Department of Higher Education, Haryana
- Department of School Education, Haryana
