= Gosi Khurd Irrigation Project =

Gosikhurd Irrigation Project
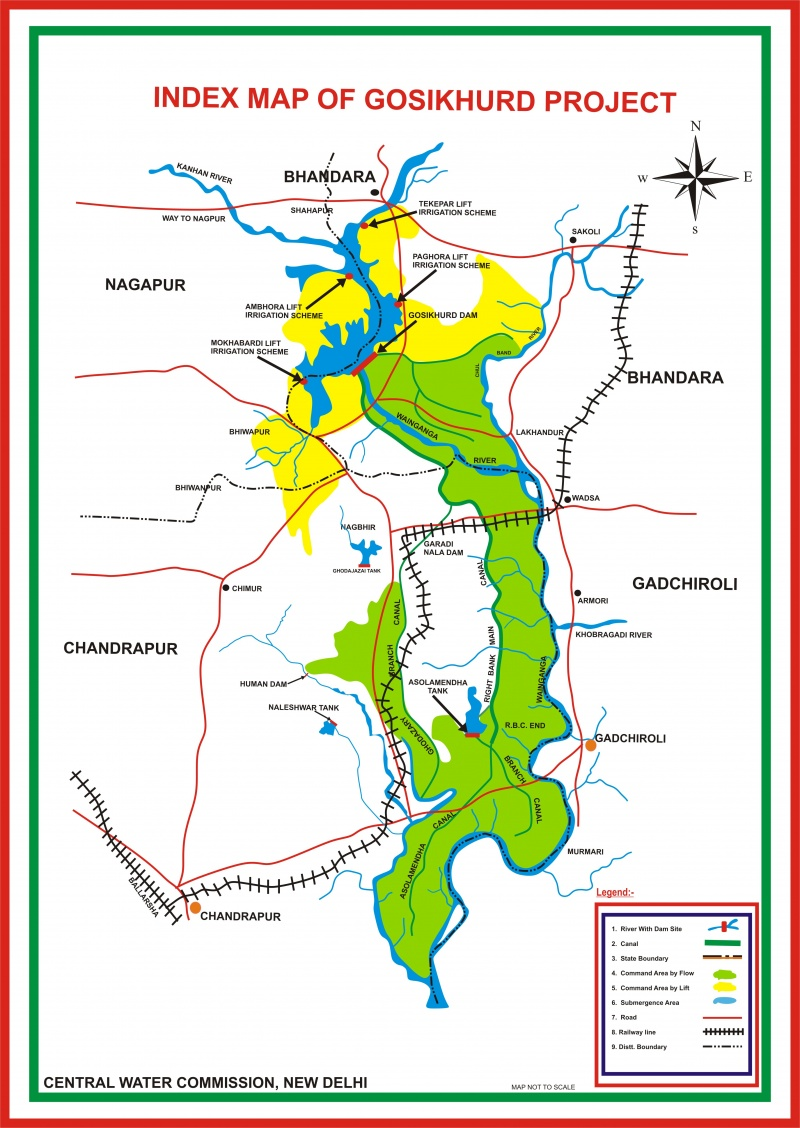
- Map of Gosi Khurd Irrigation Project

- Location of GosiKhurd Project in Maharashtra
- Interactive map of Gosikhurd Irrigation Project
- Official name: Gosi Khurd Irrigation Project D05104
- Location: Pauni, Maharashtra; India
- Coordinates: 20.78°N 79.63°E
- Owner: Government of Maharashtra

Dam and spillways
- Type of dam: Earthfill
- Impounds: Wainganga River
- Height: 22.5 m (74 ft)
- Length: 11,356 m (37,257 ft)
- Spillway type: Ogee
- Spillway capacity: 67,373 cubic metres per second (2,379,300 cu ft/s)

Reservoir
- Creates: Indira Sagar Lake
- Total capacity: 769,483,000 m^{3} (623,830 acre⋅ft)
- Surface area: 22.258 km^{2} (9 mi^{2})

GosiKhurd Irrigation Project also known as Indira Sagar Irrigation Project is one of the major irrigation projects in Godavari basin in Indian state Maharashtra in the Bhandara district on the river Wainganga. The project was launched in 7th Five Year Plan by former Prime Minister Rajiv Gandhi during 1984. It has been declared as National Irrigation Project by Government of India.

The project involved, Gose Khurd Dam along with the network of water canals including 99 km long right bank canal, 22.93 km left bank canal, lifting stations at Akot, Ambhora, Mokharbardi, Nerla and Tekepar. The project also included renovation of Asolamendha dam on river Pathari. The project is aimed to irrigate 2.5 lakh hectares of land. The project is designed to provide an annual irrigation to an area of 89,856 ha in Bhandara district, 19,481 ha in Nagpur district and 1,41,463 ha in Chandrapur district.

== Project timelines ==
The project was accepted by the technical advisory committee in 1988 with an estimated cost of INR 461.19 Crores at the 1981–82 price level. The project got approval by the Forest and Environment department in 1988. The project was approved by Planning Commission of India in 1995. The updated cost of the project was INR 7777.85 Crores at 2007–08 prices that were approved by Planning Commission. The project was getting funds under Accelerated Irrigation Benefits Program (AIBP) since 1996. In 2009 it was declared as a National Project. Till 2009 19179 hectares of irrigation potential was created while remaining will be created as a national project.

Project affected people started receiving compensations promised by Chief Minister Pruthviraj Chavan in 2013.

== Project hurdles and criticism ==
A major criticism of the project involved environmental damage and damage to local livelihood. Around 92 villages were affected by this project making total PAP (Project affected people) of more than 1 lakh. Organization of the project affected inhabitants was formed named Gosikhurd Prakalpgrast Sangharsh Samiti. It demanded compensation as per 1999 rehabilitation norms as well as special benefits offered after the project was given national status. Gosikhurd Prakalpgrast Sangharsh Samiti demanded that in addition to alternative agriculture land, displaced farmers should be provided basic civic amenities, INR 12 lakhs in lieu of Government job, INR 1 lakh for building a cattle shed, compensation for farm labour at the revised rates.

== Present Status ==
Gosi Khurd dam is almost complete and Ambhora lifting station is complete. The work of the canal system is in progress.

== Salient Features ==
1	Location of Dam
	State	Maharashtra
	District	Bhandara
	Tahsil	Pauni
	Village	Gosikhurd
	Latitude	20°-52’ – 15” N
	Longitude	79°-37’ – 0” E
2	Name of River	Wainganga River (Godavari Basin)
3	Catchment Area
	Catchment Area (Sq. km.)	Madhya Pradesh	Maharashtra	Total
		24243	10619	34862
	Catchment Area (Free) (Sq. km.)	5902
4	Average Annual Rainfall	1320.8 mm
5	Average Monsoon Rainfall	1200 mm
6	Water Availability
	75% dependable yield	14196 Mm3
	Post Monsoon yield (4.7%)	667 Mm3
	Total annual yield	14863 Mm3
