= Seventh-day Adventist Church, Nilokheri =

Seventh-day Adventist Church
- Seventh-day Adventist Church, Nilokheri
- Seventh-day Adventist Church
- 29.83°N 76.92°E
- Location: G.T. Road, Nilokheri, Haryana -132117, Nilokheri, Haryana
- Country: India
- Denomination: Adventist Church
- Website: www.simlachandigarhdiocese.com

History
- Consecrated: 3 December 2001

Architecture
- Architectural type: Parish church
- Style: Cathedral style
- Years built: 31 July 2000

Administration
- District: Karnal
- Province: Province of Delhi
- Diocese: Simla and Chandigarh

Seventh-day Adventist Church, Karnal is one of the two Protestant churchs in Nilokheri, India. It is the only Adventist church in the area.

== History ==
With the establishment of Nilokheri township the Adventist Church was established in 1950 by the Protestant Indian Christians.

== Parish members ==
There are 50 families and a total of 250 people in the parish. Christian devotees are the people from various regions of India such as Jharkhand, Punjab, South India apart from local Christians who settled here due to the reason of employment.

== Priest in the service of Church ==
Pastor Sunny i.e. Manzoor Masshi serves the church since it was built.

== See also ==
- Nilokheri
