= The United Church, Nilokheri =

- The United Church, Nilokheri
- The United Church, Nilokheri
- 29.83°N 76.92°E
- Location: Goal Market, Nilokheri, Haryana -132117, Nilokheri, Haryana
- Country: India
- Denomination: The United Church, Nilokheri
- Website: www.simlachandigarhdiocese.com

History
- Founded: 31 July 1950

Architecture
- Style: Cathedral style

Administration
- District: Karnal
- Province: Province of Karnal
- Diocese: Diocese of Delhi
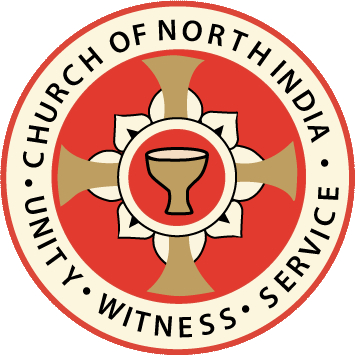

The United Church, Nilokheri is one of the two Protestant churches in the Gole market area of Nilokheri, Haryana, India. It is the only Church of North India (CNI) church in the area.

== History ==
With the establishment of Nilokheri township the CNI Church was established in 1950 by the Protestant Indian Christians. It is under the Diocese of Delhi. The Nilokheri municipality has an estimated population of approximately 26,000 in 2025 and 1.17 per cent are Christians.

== Building ==
The church building has been renovated and includes a spacious hall and an altar.

== Parish members ==
There are 50 families and total strength of 250 people. Christian devotees are the people from various regions of India such as Jharkhand, Punjab, South India apart from local Christians who settled here due to the reason of employment.
