= Lakhwar Dam =

- Location within India
- Country: India
- Location: Lakhwar, Dehradun district, Uttarakhand
- Coordinates: 30°31′15″N 77°54′52″E
- Purpose: Power
- Status: Under construction
- Construction began: 1987
- Opening date: 2034 (est.)
- Owner: Uttarakhand Jal Vidyut Nigam Limited

Dam and spillways
- Type of dam: Gravity
- Impounds: Yamuna River
- Height: 192 m (630 ft)

Reservoir
- Total capacity: 580,000,000 m^{3} (470,000 acre⋅ft)
- Active capacity: 333,000,000 m^{3} (270,000 acre⋅ft)
- Inactive capacity: 247,000,000 m^{3} (200,000 acre⋅ft)
- Surface area: 9.57 km^{2} (3.69 mi^{2})
- Normal elevation: 796 m (2,612 ft)

Power Station
- Commission date: ??
- Hydraulic head: 148 m (486 ft)
- Turbines: 3 x 100 MW Francis-type
- Installed capacity: 300 MW

Lakhwar-Vyasi Dam project on Yamuna River, includes under-construction Lakhwar Dam and Power Station, Vyasi Dam, Hathiari Power Station and Katapathar Barrage, near the Lakhwar town in Kalsi block of Dehradun district of Uttarakhand in India, for the purpose of irrigation of 40,000 hectare land and total 927 MW hydroelectric power generation. "Lakhwar Dam" is a gravity dam near the Lohari village with 300MW power generation capacity. "Vyasi Dam" will be built 5 km downstream along with 120 MW "Hathiari Power Station" further 0.5 km downstream. "Katapathar Barrage", with the maximum ponding water level at 514.5m elevation, will be built further 2.75 km downstream of the Hathiari Power Station to supply the water to stakeholder states. Project will hold 580 million cubic metres water during monsoon and release into Yamuna during dry months.

Construction of Lakhwar dam commenced in early 2018 with the 4 year target completion date of December 2022. Vyasi dam has already been under construction since 2016.

== History ==
In 1976, Planning Commission granted approval for the project. In 1986 environmental clearance was granted and construction on the 204 m (669 ft) tall dam began in 1987 by Jaypee Group under the supervision of the Uttar Pradesh Irrigation Department, when the area belonged to Uttar Pradesh. In 1992, the construction was halted at 35 percent progress after Jaypee Group pulled out due to the lack of funding. In 2008, it was notified as a national project by the union govt and the union govt will bear the 90% cost. In November 2013, construction restarted on the Vyasi Dam and it once again received environmental clearance from the Ministry of Environment and Forests in February 2014. Vyasi Dam was expected to be completed in 2016, revised to 2018. Project was stalled for almost 30 years, which was expedited with enhanced compensation payment in 2016 to the displaced villagers.

=== Current status ===
During 2016, Vyasi Dam and Hathiari Power Station were being constructed simultaneously, and Lakhwar Dam was planned to be constructed after the completion of Vyasi dam, due to the lack of funds. All approvals are in place for the whole project including the Lakhwar Dam, except for the funding from the union government (c. 2017).

In April 2016, things were expedited when Government of India, under Prime Minister Narendra Modi, granted clearance for the release of funding for the whole project at an estimated cost of INR39.7 billion (3966.51 crore), including INR25 billion (2578.23 crore) for the irrigation component to build dam and canals and INR13,9 billion (1388.28 crore) for the power generation component. Subsequently, in January 2018, bid for the construction of Lakhwar dam and 300MW power station was called by the Uttrakhand Jal Vidyut Nigam Limited. Soon after in early 2018, Prime Minister Modi laid the foundation stone, and construction commenced after contracts were awarded with a target completion deadline of 4 years by December 2022. As of May 2026, completion of this dam is delayed until 2034.

== The project ==
The 927MW electricity and 580 million cubic metres water capacity project will irrigate 40,000 hectare land, and submerge 50 villages and 868.08 ha of forest land.

=== Stakeholder states ===
The project will water to the states of Haryana, Uttrakhand, Uttar Pradesh, Himachal Pradesh, Delhi and Rajasthan. Haryana's share in this project is 1.22 lakh acre feet additional water.

=== Lakhwar Dam and Power Station ===
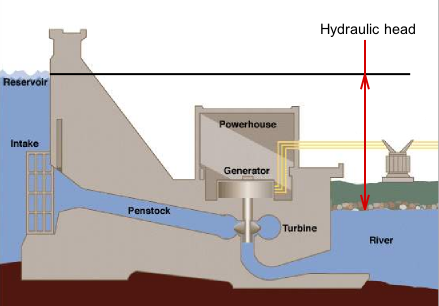
head.

Lakhwar Dam is 192 meter high concrete gravity dam with 165.9 meter long head and 20 to 50 km long backwater reservoir on Yamuna River near Lohari village close to Lakhwar town, with 900 MW (3 X 300 MW) Underground power station on right/east side of Yamuna river. It will have storage capacity of 333.04 million cubic meter.

=== Vyasi Dam ===
Vyasi Dam, also Byasi Dam, is 86 meter high concrete gravity dam with 113.92 meter long head that will be built 5 km downstream from Lakhwar Dam, with 120 MW power generation capacity at Hathiari. It is close to Juddo village which will be flooded once the dam is complete. Expected to be completed in May 2018.

=== Hathiari Power Station ===
Hathiari Power Station, 0.5 km downstream from Vyasi dam on the right/east side of the Yamuna, will have 120 MW of electricity generation capacity. The power station will have a 2.7 km long Run-of-the-river hydroelectricity power tunnel 7 meters in diameter with 70 Cumecs discharge, a 63.50 meter high Surge shaft 18 meters in diameter, two Pressure shafts each 209 meters long and 4 meters in diameter, and a Surface Power House (72 meters long x 24 meters wide x 40.2 meters high) with two Semi Umbrella Generators of 60 MW each composed of two Vertical Francis Turbines.

=== Katapathar Barrage ===
Katapathar Barrage, with the maximum ponding water level at 514.5m elevation, will be built further 2.75 km downstream of the "Hathiari Power Station". It will be used to store and uniformly distribute water to the stakeholder states.

== See also ==
- Dams on Indus
- Dams on Jhelum
- Dams on Chenab
- Dams on Ravi
- Dams on Beas
- Dams on Sutlej
- Dams on Yamuna
  - Kishau Dam, under-construction on Tons river tributary of Yamuna with 2028 expected completion
  - Reuka Ji Dam, under-construction with expected completion date of 2030
- Indus Water Treaty
