= Kishau Dam =

Dam in Himachal Pradesh/Uttarakhand, India

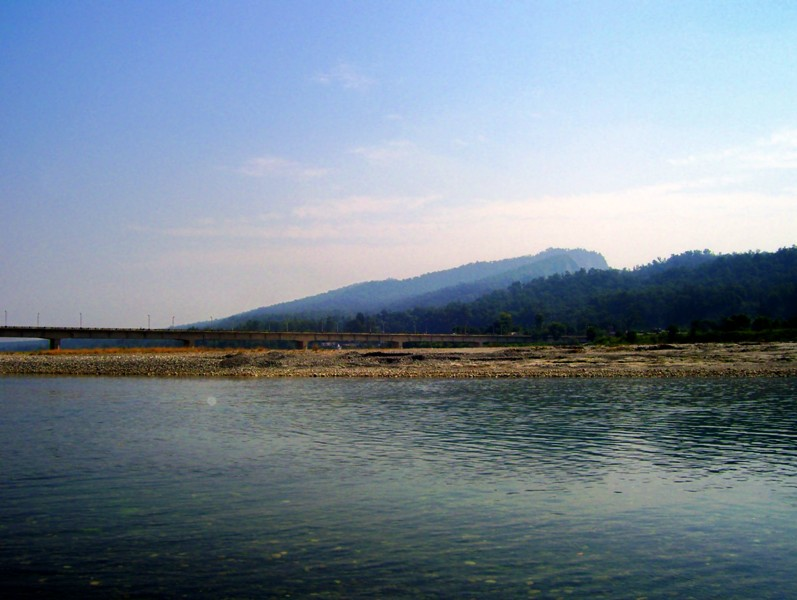

- Location within Himachal Pradesh Location within Uttarakhand Location within India
- Country: India
- Location: Himachal Pradesh/Uttarakhand
- Coordinates: 30°44′59.30″N 77°42′15.96″E
- Purpose: Power, irrigation
- Status: Proposed
- Opening date: 2028 (est.)
- Construction cost: ₹15,624 crore (US$1.6 billion)

Dam and spillways
- Type of dam: Gravity
- Impounds: Tons River
- Height: 236 m (774 ft)

Power Station
- Commission date: 2028 (est.)
- Type: Conventional
- Hydraulic head: 186 m (610 ft)
- Turbines: 4 x 165 MW Francis-type
- Installed capacity: 660 MW

Kishau Dam Hydroelectricity Power Project is an under-construction gravity dam on the Tons River (tributary of Yamuna) which will straddle the border between the Indian states of Himachal Pradesh and Uttarakhand. The project site is about 39 km (24 mi) north of Dakpathar and upstream of the Ichari Dam. The primary purpose of the dam is 660 MW power generation and downstream water supply for the irrigation of 97,076 hectares (239,880 acres) of crops.

== History ==
Construction of was originally expected to begin in 2015, but years of negotiations over water-sharing among the stakeholder states caused delay. In 2018, Ministry of Environment and Forests approval was granted.

== Details ==
INR 11500 cr 236 m high concrete gravity dam with 1379 MU electricity generation and 1324 MCM live storage has Delhi, Haryana, Himachal Pradesh, Rajasthan, Uttarakhand, and Uttar Pradesh as stakeholder states.

== Current status ==
- 2025 May: Completion is slated for 2028.
- 2026 September: Himachal Pradesh, Haryana, Uttarakhand, Uttar Pradesh, Rajasthan and Delhi signed an agreement for the project's implementation, with the central government to bear about 90% of the cost and the participating states/UT the remaining 10%.

== See also ==
- Lakhwar-Vyasi project, under-construction
- Renuka Ji Dam, under-construction with expected completion date of 2030
- Dams on Yamuna
