= Haryana Civil Medical Services =

Government service in Haryana, India

Haryana Civil Medical Services is the government service in the Department of Health in Haryana, India. Doctors are recruited by Haryana Government to work in various government hospitals of Haryana state. The Haryana Civil Medical Services Association has 2,500 members, including 1,400 active doctors. It was set up in 1986, superseding previous organizations of healthcare professionals. http://www.svayambhuhospital.com/blog.php
