= Hari Bhoomi =

Indian newspaper

- समाचार ही नहीं, विचार भी Samācāra hī nahīṁ, vicāra bhī Not only news, but also opinion

- Type: Daily
- Format: Print, online
- Publisher: Captain Abhimanyu
- Founded: 5 September 1996; 29 years ago
- Political alignment: Neutral
- Language: Hindi
- City: North and Central India
- Country: India
- Website: www.haribhoomi.com
- Free online archives: epaper.haribhoomi.com

Hari Bhoomi (Hindi: हरिभूमि; also spelled Haribhoomi) is a Hindi-language daily newspaper published in India. It was established on 5 September 1996 and is circulated in the states of Haryana, Madhya Pradesh, and Chhattisgarh.

== History ==
Hari Bhoomi was established on 5 September 1996 as a weekly Hindi newspaper. In November 1997, it was converted into a daily newspaper with the launch of its Rohtak edition in Haryana.

In April 1998, the group expanded to Delhi and the National Capital Region, including Faridabad and Gurugram.

In March 2001, Hari Bhoomi entered Chhattisgarh with the launch of its Bilaspur edition, followed by the Raipur edition in June 2002.

In October 2008, the newspaper expanded into Madhya Pradesh with its Jabalpur edition.

== Circulation and readership ==
Edition	Copies Daily
Hari Bhoomi Rohtak Edition	1,48,417 (ABC July-Dec. 2019 figures)
Hari Bhoomi Delhi Edition	50,034 (CA Certified Figures)
Hari Bhoomi Bilaspur Edition	1,43,743 (ABC July-Dec. 2019 figures)
Hari Bhoomi Raipur Edition	2,46,005 (ABC July-Dec. 2019 figures)
Hari Bhoomi Jabalpur Edition	1,10,774 (RNI Certified Figures)
Total Circulation	8,00,559 copies circulating per day

== Readership ==
As per the figures of IRS 2019Q4 HariBhoomi is established as the 10th largest Hindi Daily in India with 15 lakhs readers. Hari Bhoomi is the largest read and circulated daily of Chhattisgarh with 9.66 lakhs readers (IRS 2019Q4) and 3.90 lakhs copies. Hari Bhoomi has a circulation of approx 2.11 in Madhya Pradesh with its Bhopal and Jabalpur edition. Hari Bhoomi has a circulation of 1.48 lakhs copies in Haryana with its Rohtak edition ( July-Dec 2019) and has a readership of 3.58 lakhs as per.

== Management ==
Abhimanyu Sindhu is the founding proprietor and Dr Himanshu Dwivedi is chief Editor।
