= Deenbandhu Chhotu Ram Thermal Power Station =

Power plant in Haryana, India

- Country: India
- Location: Yamuna Nagar, Haryana
- Coordinates: 30.109568°N 77.325511°E
- Status: Operational
- Commission date: 2007
- Operator: HPGCL

Thermal power station
- Primary fuel: Coal

Power generation
- Units operational: 2 × 300 MW
- Nameplate capacity: 600 MW

Deenbandhu Chhotu Ram Thermal Power Plant is located at Yamuna Nagar in Haryana. The power plant is one of the coal based power plants of HPGCL. It was jointly constructed by Reliance Energy Limited and Shanghai Electric (China) in a collaboration. This plant is named after Sir Chhotu Ram.

== History ==
The project was first conceived in 1981-82 but it remained in suspended animation for more than two decades. The previous governments tried to implement the project, first through the private sector, then through the National Thermal Power Corporation, and thereafter attempts were also made to get it executed through foreign investments. But the project remained only on paper because governments were not serious about setting up this project. Former Indian prime minister, P V Narasimha Rao even laid the foundation stone of this project through remote control from Faridabad in March 1993. At that time, the project was planned to be executed by NTPC, but that too could not go beyond construction of a few residential and non-residential buildings. In year 2004 then chief minister of Haryana Om Prakash Chautala again laid the stone of this thermal plant but again the project remained on papers only. But in year 2005 the new chief minister of Haryana Bhupinder Singh Hooda gave nod to the project and the plant was finally developed in 2005-2008.

== Power plant ==
Deenbandhu Chhotu Ram Thermal Power Station has an installed capacity of 600 MW. The First unit was commissioned in April 2008. This is the first project in the state to award to private developer. The total available land of the project is 1107 acres. First unit was commissioned in a record period of 27 months which is the lowest for any coal based green field project in the country. The plant gets coal from Central coal fields.

== Installed capacity ==
Stage	Unit Number	Installed Capacity (MW)	Date of Commissioning	Status
First	1	300	April, 2008	Running
First	2	300	June, 2008	Running
Second	1	800	2029	Upcoming

== Future expansions ==
HPGCL has announced the expansion of this plant. A 800 MW capacity additional super critical thermal unit at Yamuna Nagar will be operational by 2027. HPGCL has issued an order to Bharat Heavy Electricals Limited for EPC contract of 800 MW unit which is likely to completed within 48-57 months.
