= Panipat Thermal Power Station II =

Power plant in India

- Country: India
- Location: Panipat, Khukhrana, Panipat, Haryana
- Coordinates: 29°23′51″N 76°52′25″E
- Status: Operational
- Commission date: 1989
- Operator: HPGCL

Thermal power station
- Primary fuel: Coal

Power generation
- Units operational: 4
- Nameplate capacity: 920.00 MW

Panipat Thermal Power Station II is located at Panipat in Haryana. The power plant is one of the coal based power plants of HPGCL

== Power plant ==
The first four units was bifurcated from the total 8 units of the plant, so that to form Panipat Thermal Power Station I and II. Panipat Thermal Power Station II has an installed capacity of 920 MW. This plant was developed under 4 stages.

== Installed capacity ==
Stage	Unit Number	Installed Capacity (MW)	Date of Commissioning	Status
Stage III	5	210	March 1989	not Running
Stage IV	6	210	March 2001	Running
Stage V	7	250	September 2004	Running
Stage VI	8	250	January 2005	Running

== See also ==
- Panipat Thermal Power Station I
