= Panipat Thermal Power Station I =

Power plant in Haryana, India

- Country: India
- Location: Khukhrana, Panipat, Panipat, Haryana
- Coordinates: 29°23′50″N 76°52′52″E
- Status: Operational
- Commission date: 1979
- Decommission date: Unknown
- Operator: HPGCL

Thermal power station
- Primary fuel: Coal

Power generation
- Units operational: 4
- Nameplate capacity: 1370.8 MW

Panipat Thermal Power Station I is located at Khukhrana Panipat in Haryana. The power plant is one of the coal based power plants of HPGCL, It was formerly known as the Tau Devi Lal Thermal Power Station.

== Power plant ==
The first four units was bifurcated from the total 8 units of the plant, so that to form Panipat Thermal Power Station I and II. Panipat Thermal Power Station I has an installed capacity of 447.80 MW. The First unit was commissioned in November 1979. In order to improve the performance of the all four units of the plant, the Renovation and Modernisation has been started. The 3 cooling towers of this power plant was demolished in 2019.

== Installed capacity ==
Stage	Unit Number	Installed Capacity (MW)	Date of Commissioning	Status
Stage I	1	110	1 November 1979	Not Running
Stage I	2	110	27 March 1980	Not Running
Stage II	3	110	1 November 1985	Not Running
Stage II	4	110	11 January 1987	Not Running

== See also ==
- Panipat Thermal Power Station II
