= Abhimanyu Singh Sindhu =

Indian politician

Captain (Retd.) Abhimanyu Singh Sindhu
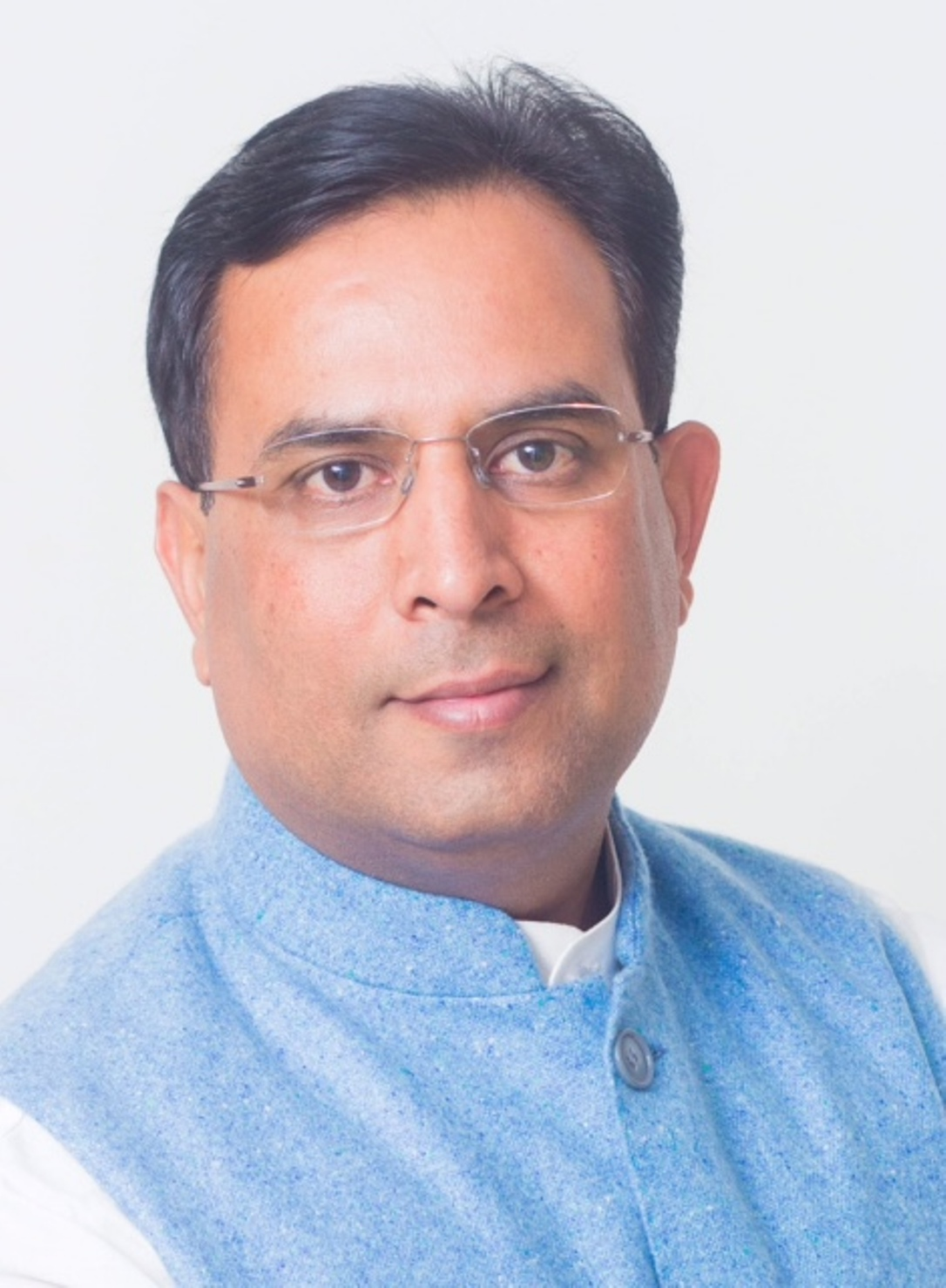
- Captain Abhimanyu

Cabinet Minister Government of Haryana
- In office 26 October 2014 – 27 October 2019
- Ministry: Term
- Minister of Finance Minister of Revenue Minister of Excise Minister of Planning Minister of Law Minister of Institutional Finance & Credit Control Minister of Rehabilitation: 26 October 2014 – 27 October 2019
- Minister of Industry Minister of Labour Minister of Environment: 26 October 2014 – 22 July 2016
- Minister of Forest Minister of Industrial Training: 26 October 2014 – 24 July 2015

Member of Haryana Legislative Assembly
- In office 2014–2019
- Preceded by: Saroj Mor
- Succeeded by: Ram Kumar Gautam
- Constituency: Narnaund

Personal details
- Born: 18 December 1967 (age 58) Khanda Kheri, Haryana, India
- Party: Bharatiya Janata Party
- Spouse: Ekta Sindhu
- Children: 3
- Education: Harvard Business School, Maharishi Dayanand University, Guru Jambheshwar University of Science and Technology
- Occupation: Politician
- Profession: Soldier; journalist; businessperson; social reformer
- Awards: Haryana Sahitya Akademi's Babu Bal Mukund Gupt award for Journalism
- Website: captainabhimanyu.in

Military service
- Allegiance: India
- Branch/service: Indian Army
- Years of service: 1987–1994
- Rank: Captain
- Unit: 7Mechanised Infantry Regiment
- As of 21 October, 2014

Captain Abhimanyu Singh Sindhu (born 18 December 1967) is an Indian politician. He was cabinet minister with independent charge of eight departments in the Government of Haryana state in India in the first-ever government led by the Bharatiya Janata Party (BJP) in Haryana.

He served as a Cabinet Minister in the first-ever BJP-led government in Haryana (2014–2019) and is widely credited with playing a pivotal role in establishing BJP as a major political force in the state.

He is also the founder-editor of the Hindi daily Hari Bhoomi and has been associated with various philanthropic initiatives, including the Sindhu Education Foundation and Param Mitra Manav Nirman Sansthan.

== Early life and education ==
Abhimanyu was born on 18 December 1967 in Khanda Kheri village, Hisar district, Haryana, into a family rooted in Arya Samaj vedic values.

He completed his Bachelor of Commerce from Maharshi Dayanand University, Rohtak, in 1986, followed by an LLB in 2005 from the same university.

He completed a Postgraduate Diploma in Mass Communication from Guru Jambheshwar University, Hisar, in 2007, and completed a three year executive education program at Harvard Business School in 2015.

In 2019, he earned his LL.M. (Pro) from National Law University, New Delhi.

== Military and early career ==
In 1987, Abhimanyu was commissioned into the Indian Army after graduating from the Officers' Training Academy. He served for five years in the 7 Mechanised Infantry Regiment, earning the Special Services Medal for his distinguished service.

In 1994, although selected in the Indian Administrative Service entrance exam with 201 rank in the first attempt, he chose to dedicate himself instead to philanthropy, education, and public service.

Prior to formally entering politics, he founded multiple businesses across sectors like transport, finance, and media. He was founder and editor of the newspaper Hari Bhoomi.

== Political career ==
=== Early political involvement ===
In 1997, he participated in the Swarna Jayanti Rath Yatra led by senior BJP leader L.K. Advani.

In 2003, he contributed to the BJP’s election management team in Chhattisgarh, helping the party form its first-ever government in the state.

=== Electoral contests and party roles (2004–2013) ===
Despite early electoral setbacks, Abhimanyu emerged as a central organizational figure within the BJP:

- As General Secretary of Haryana BJP (2005–2010), he organized major rallies for Prime Minister Atal Bihari Vajpayee, enhancing the party's visibility in Rohtak and Jhajjar.
- Nationally, he contributed to BJP’s victories in Uttarakhand (2007) and Punjab (2012), where the Akali Dal–BJP alliance achieved a historic victory, breaking a 37-year trend of anti-incumbency.
- In 2013, he was appointed National Spokesperson and co-incharge of Uttar Pradesh, playing a role in preparing the ground for BJP’s 2014 electoral success.
- On 15 September 2013, Abhimanyu also organised the landmark Ex-Servicemen Rally in Rewari, which marked the first major public event of Narendra Modi's 2014 Lok Sabha campaign. The rally drew an unprecedented gathering of veterans and supporters, signaling the beginning of a strong nationwide outreach. It played a key role in establishing PM Modi’s connect with the armed forces community and set the tone for the BJP's campaign narrative centered on nationalism and development.
- Organized and participated major mass mobilizations like the:
  - Jhajjar Vijay Sankalp Rally
  - Loktantar Bachao Rally
  - Bijli Khoj Rally
  - Ram Sethu Movement
  - Vijay Sankalp Yatra
  - Jal Adhikar Rally

=== Legislative and ministerial career (2014–2019) ===
In the 2014 Haryana Legislative Assembly elections, Abhimanyu won the Narnaund seat, marking a breakthrough for BJP in the region. He was inducted as a Cabinet Minister in Haryana’s first BJP-led government under Chief Minister Manohar Lal Khattar, handling an unprecedented 13 departments — the highest held by any minister during the term.

=== Key ministerial portfolios ===
Minister of Finance, Minister of Revenue, Minister of Excise, Minister of Planning, Minister of Law, Minister of Institutional Finance & Credit Control, Minister of Rehabilitation, Minister of Industry, Minister of Labour, Minister of Environment, Minister of Forest, Minister of Industrial Training.

=== Major reforms and achievements ===
- Agriculture: Introduced ₹12,000 per acre compensation for crop failure — a first in Haryana.
- Land Governance: Pioneered drone-based property mapping and fully digitized land records, reducing long-standing land ownership disputes.
- Finance & Taxation: Spearheaded Excise Policy and VAT Online, contributed to GST Council deliberations, and introduced Performance Linked Account (PLA) for real-time budget allocations.
- Industrial Growth: Elevated Haryana’s Ease of Doing Business rank from 14th to 2nd nationally.
- Digital Governance: Led the rollout of digital pension disbursement and e-governance schemes aligned with the Digital India Mission.

=== National campaigns and party leadership (2017–2024) ===
Abhimanyu continued to play roles in BJP’s electoral strategy:

- Served as BJP in-charge for Punjab and Chandigarh (2017, 2018), and as co-incharge of Uttar Pradesh during the 2022 Assembly elections, where BJP achieved its highest seat share.
- In 2024, he managed BJP’s campaign in Assam as state in charge, contributing to the party’s record performance in the state.

=== International recognition ===
Abhimanyu became the first minister from Haryana to:

- Address the International Labour Conference in Geneva.
- Speaker at the prestigious Harvard India Conference, where he showcased Haryana’s governance and reform initiatives.

== Philanthropy and social initiatives ==
- Abhimanyu and Param Mitra Manav Nirman Sansthan have also been active in social service. They have been instrumental in establishing and supporting multiple Gurukuls across various states, where free education, accommodation, food, and other necessities are provided to underprivileged students. These Gurukuls aim to impart Vedic education along with modern subjects, fostering all-round development grounded in cultural and ethical values. Through these institutions, has worked to advance the social reformist ideals of ancient wisdom, emphasizing education, self-reliance, and moral development, particularly among economically disadvantaged sections of society.
- Donated his entire earning of five years from government salary as a minister (2014–2019) to sponsor weddings for 251 underprivileged girls.
- Supports mass education projects through the Sindhu Education Foundation, which runs over a dozen schools and colleges in Haryana and Chhattisgarh.
- Active promoter of archery, serving as President of the Haryana Archery Association and Senior Vice-President of the Archery Association of India.
- Medical camps and various other initiatives aimed at improving livelihoods in rural areas.

== Personal life ==
He hails from a large, joint family of Rohtak. His father, Ch Mitter Sen Sindhu, was an industrialist, great philanthropist, and social reformer, whose ideals greatly influenced him.

Ch. Mitter Sen Sindhu actively participated in the Hindi Satyagraha agitation led by Arya Samaj in 1957, advocating for Hindi as India’s national language. He was arrested during the movement and released on 28 September 1957. He later established educational and industrial ventures focused on rural upliftment.

Abhimanyu remains closely associated with Vedic principles, emphasizing truth (Satya), equality (Samata), education (Shiksha), and social reform (Sudhar).

=== Ideological influences ===
Abhimanyu has been deeply influenced by the teachings of Dayanand Saraswati and Swami Vivekananda, particularly Vivekananda’s emphasis on selfless service, national pride, and the empowerment of youth through education and character-building. Inspired by Vivekananda’s vision of a spiritually awakened and socially responsible India, he has consistently promoted initiatives that integrate moral values, cultural pride, and social service. His focus on education through Gurukuls and his engagement in social reform efforts reflect Vivekananda’s ideals of upliftment through knowledge, discipline, and spiritual awareness.

== Legacy ==
Abhimanyu is widely regarded as one of the most influential and disciplined political leaders in Haryana’s modern political history. Known for blending military discipline, strategic foresight, and organizational acumen, he is credited with transforming BJP’s footprint in Haryana during a period when the party struggled for relevance.

A close aide of Amit Shah, Abhimanyu also played a significant behind-the-scenes role in BJP’s landmark victory in Uttar Pradesh during the 2014 Lok Sabha elections. His lifelong loyalty and commitment to the party, even during politically adverse periods, position him as a key pillar of the BJP in Haryana
