= Government of Haryana =

Indian state government

Government of Haryana हरियाणा सरकार
- Seat of Government: Chandigarh
- Website: haryana.gov.in

Legislative branch
- Assembly: Haryana Legislative Assembly
- Speaker: Harvinder Kalyan
- Deputy Speaker: Krishan Lal Middha
- Members in Assembly: 90

Executive branch
- Governor: Ashim Kumar Ghosh
- Chief Minister: Nayab Singh Saini (BJP)
- Chief Secretary: Shri Anurag Rastogi IAS

Judiciary
- High Court: Punjab and Haryana High Court
- Chief Justice: Hon'ble Mr. Justice Ashwani Kumar Mishra
- Seat: Chandigarh

Government of Haryana, also known as the State Government of Haryana, or locally as the Haryana Government, is the supreme governing authority of the Indian state of Haryana and its 22 districts. It consists of an executive, ceremonially led by the Governor of Haryana and otherwise by the Chief Minister, a judiciary, and a legislative branch.

== Branches of government ==
=== Executive ===
The head of state of Haryana is the Governor, appointed by the President of India on the advice of the central government. The Chief Minister of Haryana is the head of Council of Ministers of Haryana and is vested with most of the executive powers to run the 22 districts of Haryana across its six divisions.

=== Legislative ===
Chandigarh is the capital of Haryana and houses the Haryana Vidhan Sabha (Legislative Assembly) and the secretariat. The city also serves as the capital of Punjab, and is a union territory of India.

The present Legislative Assembly of Haryana is unicameral, consisting of 90 members of the legislative assembly (MLAs). Its term is five years, unless dissolved earlier.

=== Judicial ===
The Punjab and Haryana High Court, located in Chandigarh, has jurisdiction over the whole state.

== Government Schemes by Haryana Government ==
Sr. No	Name of Government Scheme	Launched on	Sector
1.	Old Age Samman Allowance	1/11/2014	Social Welfare
2.	Widow Pension Scheme	1/11/2014	Social Welfare Scheme
3.	Financial Assistance to Destitute Children Scheme(FADC)	1/11/2014	Financial Assistance- State Scheme
4.	Parivar Pehchan Patra	04/08/2020	State Government

== Agencies ==
1. Gurugram Metropolitan Development Authority

=== State Public Sector Undertakings ===
1. Haryana Rail Infrastructure Development Corporation, a JV of Government of Haryana and Ministry of Railways
2. Gurugram Metropolitan City Bus Limited
3. Haryana Orbital Rail Corporation Limited
4. Haryana Knowledge Corporation Limited

== See also ==
- Divisions of Haryana
