= Elections in Haryana =

Overview of the procedure of elections in the Indian state of Haryana

Regional map of Haryana.

Elections in Haryana, which is a state in India, have been conducted since 1967 to elect the members of state-level Haryana Legislative Assembly and national-level Lok Sabha. There are 90 assembly constituencies (17 reserved for SC) and 10 Lok Sabha constituencies (2 reserved for SC).

== History ==
=== Before formation of Haryana ===
PEPSU state in East Punjab region which included present day Haryana.

Prior to Haryana's establishment as a separate state in 1966, after carving out Haryana from Punjab, elections in Haryana were part of elections in unified Punjab. Cis-Sutlej states, which included princely states of Jind, Kaithal and Kalsia, as well as the parts of princely states of Patiala and Nabha falling in Haryana, were merged with the PEPSU Legislative Assembly (which existed from 1948 to 1956). On 1 November 1956, PEPSU was merged mostly into Punjab State following the States Reorganisation Act. Part of former state of PEPSU lie within the present state of Haryana which was separated from Punjab on 1 November 1966, those parts include the area around Jind and the Narnaul enclave. Until 1967 elections in Haryana were part of the Elections in Punjab.

=== After formation of Haryana ===
Haryana was carved out of the former state of East Punjab on 1 November 1966 on linguistic as well as on cultural basis. Since 1967 elections have been held by the Election Commission of Haryana. 1st (1951), 2nd (1957) and 3rd (1962) Lok Sabha elections (also called general elections) were held when Haryana was still part of Punjab. Haryana was divided into 10 Lok Sabha constituencies, out of which 2 are reserved. After the electoral boundaries delimitation in 2007 by the Delimitation Commission of India, Bhiwani and Mahendragarh constituencies became dysfunctional and those were replaced by 2 new reorganised constituencies.

=== Delimitation ===
After formation of Haryana in 1966, the composition of Lok Sabha was changed and seats were enhanced to accommodate additional seats from the newly formed state of Haryana. Last delimitation of electoral boundaries of Lok Sabha and Legislative Assembly constituencies in Haryana was done by the Delimitation Commission of India in 2007-08. After the delimitation in 2007-08, Bhiwani and Mahendragarh constituencies were merged to form Bhiwani–Mahendragarh and a new Gurgaon Lok Sabha constituency was craved out by bifurcating the existing Faridabad Lok Sabha Constituency.

Currently Haryana has 10 Lok Sabha and 90 Legislative Assembly seats, of which 2 Lok Sabha and 17 Legislative Assembly seats are reserved for the Scheduled Castes. For the 2026 delimitation, Haryana is proposed to have 14 Lok Sabha and 126 Legislative Assembly seats, of which 3 Lok Sabha (1 more) and 25 Legislative Assembly (8 more) seats will be reserved. This will add 4 Lok Sabha and 36 Legislative Assembly seats to Haryana.

== Major Political Parties ==
In politics of Haryana, the Indian National Congress (INC), Bharatiya Janata Party (BJP), Indian National Lok Dal (INLD) are the major political parties in the state. In the past, various parties such as Haryana Vikas Party (HVP), Haryana Janhit Congress (BL) (HJC-BL), Janata Dal (JD), Janata Party (JP), Vishal Haryana Party (VHP), Bharatiya Jana Sangh (BJS) among others have been influential in the state.

The dynastic political clans of Haryana are often criticised for the infamous self-serving politics of the Aaya Ram Gaya Ram turncoats who notoriously engage in the frequent party switching, political horse trading, unholy political alliances, political corruption, political cronyism, nepotistic-dynastic rule which serves their own clan more than it serves their voters and people of Haryana they are ought to serve.

== Conducting elections ==
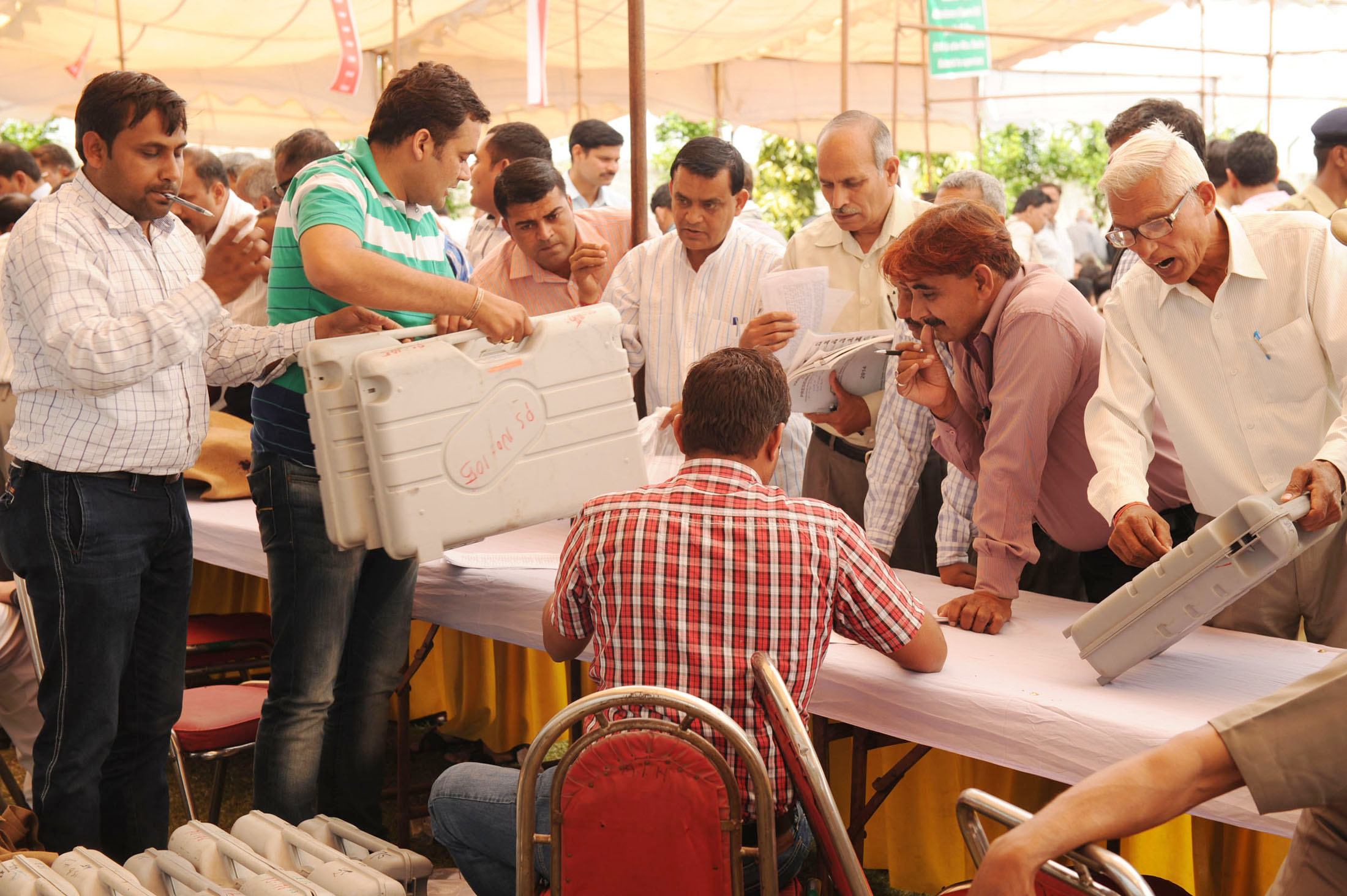
Polling officials at an Electronic Voting Machines (EVM's) distribution centre in Haryana making arrangements for elections, c. 9 April 2014.

Elections in Haryana are conducted by the Haryana State Election Commission (HSEC). which operates under the Election Commission of India (ECI). Administration of HSEC at state level is under the "Chief Electoral Officer of Haryana", who is an IAS officer of Principal Secretary rank. At the district and constituency levels, the District Magistrates (in their capacity as District Election Officers), Electoral Registration Officers and Returning Officers perform election work. Election Commission of India is an autonomous constitutional authority responsible for administering election processes in India at national, state and district level. The body administers elections to the Lok Sabha, Rajya Sabha, state Legislative Assemblies, state legislative Councils, and the offices of the President and Vice President of the country. The Election Commission operates under the authority of Constitution per Article 324, and subsequently enacted Representation of the People Act.

== Type of elections ==
Haryana, after being separated from Punjab, first went to polls in 1967. Lok Sabha elections, also called the General Elections, are held at national level, Legislative Assembly elections are held to elect the state level assembly, and the grassroots local self-governance elections are held at Municipal and Gram panchayat (village council) level.

== Lok Sabha elections ==
Lok Sabha constituencies in Haryana. Reserved constituencies in yellow.

Haryana has 10 Lok Sabha constituencies, including 2 reserved constituencies (Ambala and Sirsa).

Current constituency

- Ambala
- Bhiwani–Mahendragarh
- Faridabad
- Gurgaon
- Hisar
- Karnal
- Kurukshetra
- Rohtak
- Sirsa
- Sonipat

Defunct constituency

- Bhiwani
- Mahendragarh

List of Lok Sabha elections in Haryana.

Lok Sabha (Election)	Total Seats	Party-wise Details
4th (1967)	9	Total: 9. INC: 7, BJS: 1, Independent: 1
5th (1971)	9	Total: 9. INC: 7, BJS: 1, VHP: 1
6th (1977)	10	Total: 10. Janata Party/BLD: 10.
7th (1980)	10	Total: 10. Congress(Indira): 5, JP(S): 4, JP: 1
8th (1984)	10	Total: 10. INC: 10
9th (1989)	10	Total: 10. Janata Dal: 6, INC: 4
10th (1991)	10	Total: 10. INC: 9, HVP: 1
11th (1996)	10	Total: 10. BJP: 4 + HVP: 3, INC: 2, Independent: 1
12th (1998)	10	Total: 10. HLD(R): 4 + BSP: 1, INC: 3, NDA: 2 (BJP: 1 and HVP: 1)
13th (1999)	10	Total: 10. NDA: 10 (BJP: 5 and INLD: 5), INC: 0
14th (2004)	10	Total: 10. INC: 9, BJP: 1
15th (2009)	10	Total: 10. INC: 9, HJC(BL): 1
16th (2014)	10	Total: 10. BJP: 7, INLD: 2, INC: 1
17th (2019)	10	Total: 10. BJP: 10, INLD: 0, INC: 0
18th (2024)	10	Total: 10. BJP: 5, INC: 5, INLD: 0

== Legislative Assembly Elections ==
Haryana Legislative Assembly constituencies, reserved constituencies in yellow.

The elections for the Haryana Legislative Assembly are being held since 1967.

Year	Legislative Assembly	Party-wise Details	Chief Minister	Party
1962*	1st	Constituted out of Punjab assembly	Bhagwat Dayal Sharma	INC
1967	2nd	Total: 81. INC: 48, BJS: 12, Independents: 16	Rao Birender Singh	VHP (defected from INC), infamous Aaya Ram Gaya Ram started
1968	3rd	Total: 81. INC: 48, VHP: 16, BJS: 7	Chaudhary Bansi Lal	INC
1972	4th	Total: 81. INC: 52, NCO: 12	Chaudhary Bansi Lal; Banarsi Das Gupta	INC
1977	5th	Total: 90. Janata: 75, VHP: 5, INC: 3	Chaudhary Devi Lal; Bhajan Lal	JP; JP/INC(defected)
1982	6th	Total: 90. INC: 36, Lok Dal: 31 + BJP: 6, Independents: 16	Bhajan Lal; Chaudhary Bansi Lal	INC
1987	7th	Total: 90. Lok Dal: 60 + BJP: 16, INC: 5	Chaudhary Devi Lal; Om Prakash Chautala; Banarsi Das Gupta; Ch. Hukam Singh Phogat	Lok Dal/JD
1991	8th	Total: 90. INC: 51	Bhajan Lal	INC
1996	9th	Total: 90. HVP: 33 + BJP: 11, SAP: 24, INC: 9	Chaudhary Bansi Lal	HVP
2000	10th	Total: 90. INLD: 47 + BJP: 6, INC: 21	Om Prakash Chautala	INLD
2005	11th	Total: 90. INC: 67, INLD: 9	Bhupinder Singh Hooda	INC
2009	12th	Total: 90. INC: 40, INLD: 31, HJC(BL): 6, BJP: 4	Bhupinder Singh Hooda	INC
2014	13th	Total: 90. BJP: 47 (post-defections 52), INLD: 19, INC: 15	Manohar Lal Khattar	BJP
2019	14th	Total: 90. BJP: 40, INC: 31, JJP: 10, Others : 9	Manohar Lal Khattar	BJP
2024	15th	Total: 90. BJP: 48, INC: 37, INLD: 2, Others : 3	Nayab Singh Saini	BJP

=== Local elections ===
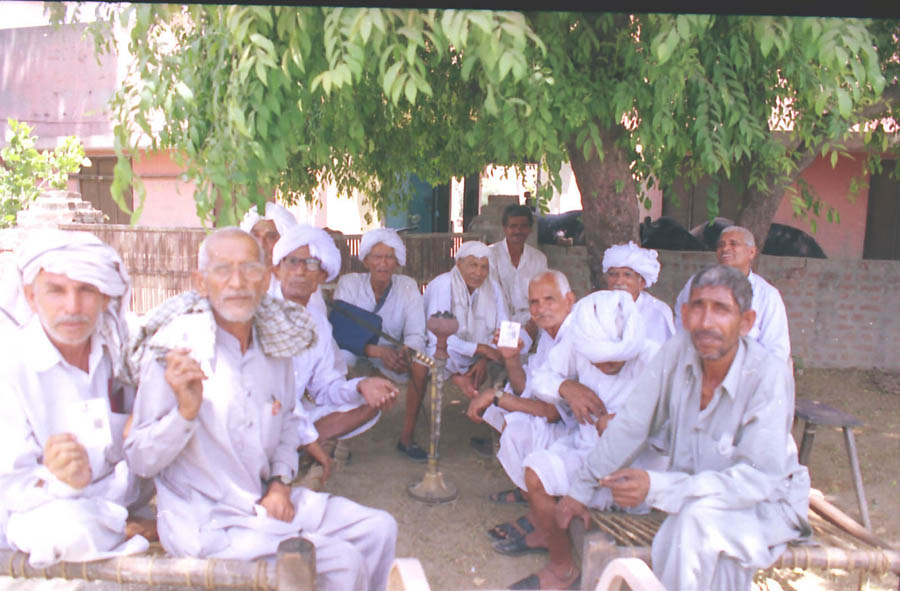
Elderly voters showing their election identity cards in a village in Haryana, c. 10 May 2004.

Local self-government in India refers to governmental jurisdictions below the level of the state in the federal republic of India with three spheres of government: central (union), state and local. The 73rd and 74th constitutional amendments give recognition and protection to local governments and in addition each state has its own local government legislation. Since 1993, local government in India takes place in two very distinct forms. Urban localities, covered in the 74th amendment to the Constitution, have Nagar Palika but derive their powers from the individual state governments, while the powers of rural localities have been formalized under the panchayati raj system, under the 73rd amendment to the Constitution. District Magistrates (in their capacity as District Election Officers), Electoral Registration Officers and Returning Officers are responsible for conducting municipal and panchayat raj elections at village, block and district level.

Haryana has 22 districts, 72 sub-divisions, 93 tehsils, 50 sub-tehsils, 142 blocks, 154 cities and towns, 6,841 villages, 6,212 villages panchayats and numerous smaller dhanis. Haryana has at least 10 municipal corporations (Gurugram, Faridabad, Ambala, Panchkula, Yamunanagar, Rohtak, Hisar, Panipat, Karnal and Sonepat), 18 municipal councils and 52 municipalities (c. Jan 2018). See the partial list (please help expand) of and .

== Electoral demography ==
=== Voters ===
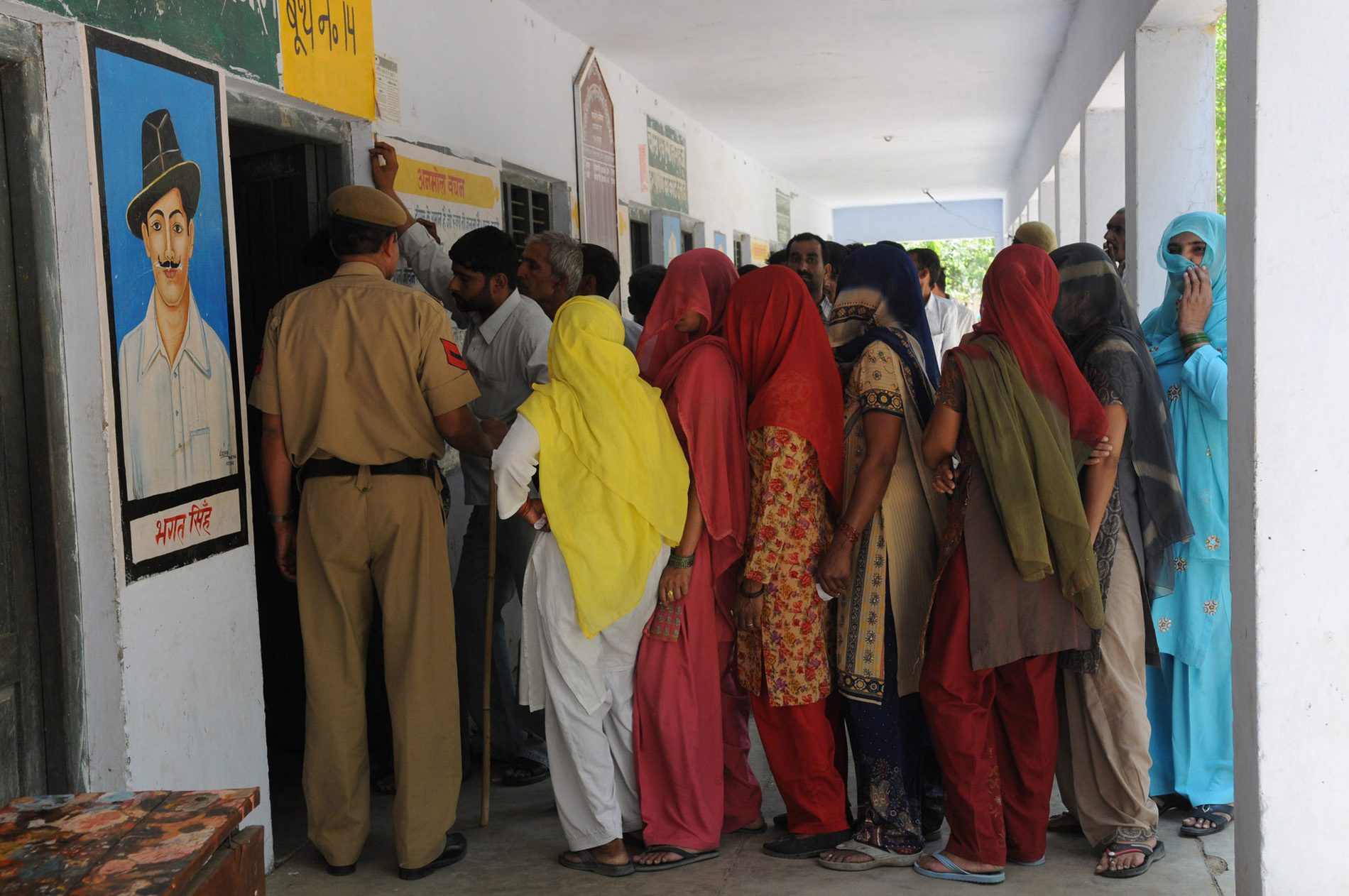
Voters queuing up to vote in Kakroi village of Sonepat in Haryana, c. 7 May 2009.

According to Election Commission of Haryana, Haryana had a population of 2,1145,000 and 25,352,000 in 2001 and 2011 respectively. In October 2019, Haryana had 1,82,98,714 voters, including 1,81,91,228 general voters and 1,07,486 Service Voters (postal voters), who will cast votes 19,425 polling stations for the 2019 Haryana Legislative Assembly election. Psephologists, electoral data scientists, political analysts, Political forecasters, opinion polls and media often analyse and discuss the electoral demography in terms of gender, age group, castes, electoral geography, ethnic enclaves, swing of voters from/to a particular party or candidate.

According to 2011 Census of India, there are 87.46% Hindus, 7.03% Muslims (mainly Meos), and 4.91% Sikhs. In terms of native language, 87.31% use Hindi, 10.57% Punjabi, and 1.23% Urdu. Haryana has 70% rural population who primarily speak Haryanvi dialect of Hindi, and related dialects, such as Bagri and Mewati.

=== Psephological regions ===
Haryana was made a separate state on linguistic and cultural basis. Consequently, within the limited context of elections the psephologists often refer to various geo-ethnic enclaves and geo-linguistic areas of Haryana, which are the Ahirwal, Deshwal belt, GT Road belt, Jat belt, Mewat, Punjabi belt, and Ror belt. Description of these psephological regions is as follows:

- Ahirwal region in South Haryana, centered around Rewari, has 11 assembly segments spread over three Lok Sabha seats — Bhiwani-Mahendergarh (Mahendergarh district only), Gurgaon and Rohtak only Kosli constituency. Ahirs are numerically founder higher here.
- Jat belt is an area where Jats are dominant in politics and numerically higher numbers compared to other castes.
- Mewat region spread across Nuh district and Hathin tehsil of Palwal district in South Haryana is numerically dominated by the Meo community who speak Mewati dialect in rural areas.
- Braj- Faridabad and Palwal, populated in large numbers by Gujjars and Jats.
- Deswali belt- Rohtak, Sonipat and Jhajjar i.e. dominated by Jats.
- Nardak region or Ror belt- Karnal, Kurukshetra, Yamunanagar and Panipat. Dominated by Rors, Sainis and Jats.
- Bangar- Jind, Kaithal and Uklana- Narnaud region of Hisar i.e. dominated by Jats.
- Bagar- Sirsa, Fatehabad, Charkhi-Dadri, Bhiwani, western Hisar i.e. dominated by Jats.
- Puadh region- Ambala and Panchkula are Puadhi speaking areas dominated by Sikhs and Hindus of various castes.

=== Electoral female disempowerment ===
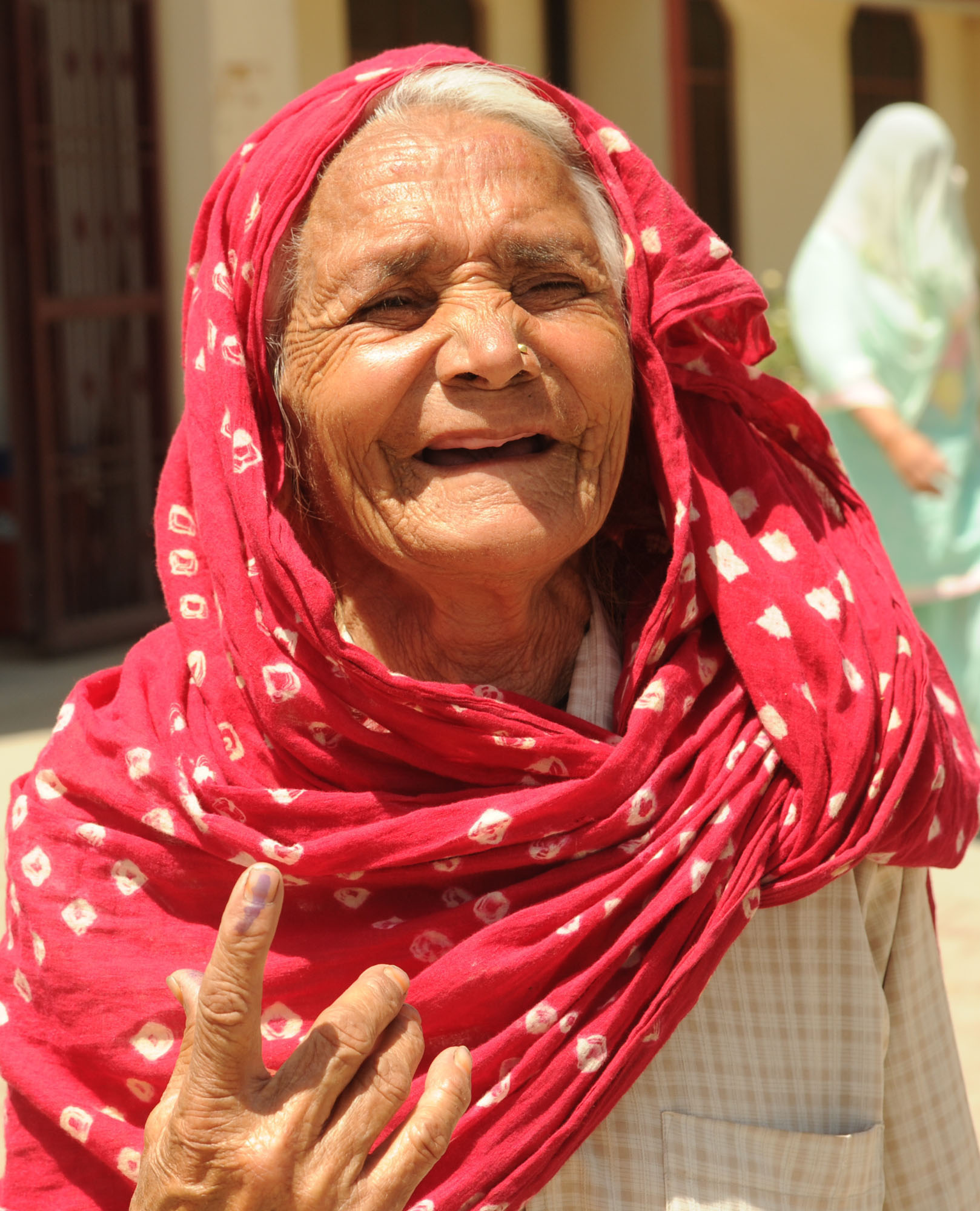
An elderly Haryanvi female voter showing indelible ink mark after casting her vote, c. 10 April 2014.

According to HSEC data Haryana has poor female participation in contesting elections, out of the 90 assembly seats there are 58 seats which have never elected a female MLA. The Kalanaur Assembly reserved constituency has elected the most number of female MLAs. From 1967 to 2014, 44 elected female MLAs were from congress, 11 from BJP, 6 from Janata Dal and INLD, 4 from Janata Party, 2 from Vishal Haryana Party, 2 from Hariyana Vikas Party. As of September 2019, only 3 female have won elections an independent candidate: Sharada Rani from Ballabgarh in 1982, Meritorious from Jhajjar in 1987 and Shakuntala Bhagwadia from Bawal in 2005. In 2014, 10 candidates were fielded by Congress, 16 by INlD, 15 by BJP, 12 by Haryana lokhit Party, 5 of HJC, 6 by Bahujan Samaj Party, and 4 by Jan Chetna Party, among them Rohita Rewari of BJP from Panipat city garnered a maximum of 63.5% votes, and a minimum of 30.3% votes were gained by Santosh Chauhan Sarwan of BJP from Mullana. In 2019 Legislative Assembly elections, only 9 (10% of total legislature membership) female candidate were elected, 4 from Congress, 3 from BJP, 1 from JJP and 1 independent. In 2024 Haryana Legislative Assembly election, 13 female candidates were elected to the legislative assembly, 7 from Congress, 5 from the BJP and an independent (who later gave support to the BJP government).

Prominent female politicians of Haryana include the late Sushma Swaraj - former Union Foreign Minister, and Chandravati - former Governor who had defeated then Chief Minister Bansi Lal in 1972.

Female contestants in Legislative Assembly elections

Election Year	Total candidates	% of female	# female candidates	# female won	% of female won (among female)	% of female won (among all)
1967			8	4	50	
1968			12	7	58	
1972			12	4	33	
1977			20	4	20	
1982			27	7	26	
1987			35	5	14	
1991			41	6	15	
1996			93	4	4	
2000			49	4	8	
2005			68	11	16	
2009						
2014			115	13	11	
2019	1168	4	?	9	?	
2024	1028	10	100	13	13	1

== See also ==
- PEPSU Legislative Assembly
- Elections in Punjab, India, Haryana was carved out of Punjab in 1966
- Elections in Himachal Pradesh, Himachal was carved out of Punjab in 1966
- Elections in India, national elections
- History of democracy in the Indian-subcontinent
- Divisions of Haryana
