= 1999 Indian general election in Haryana =

10 seats
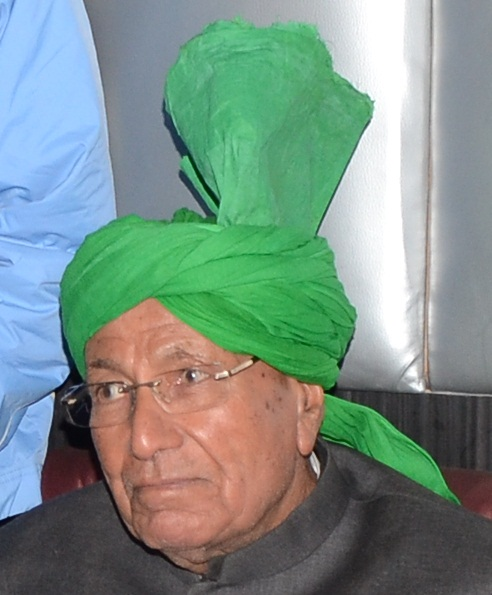

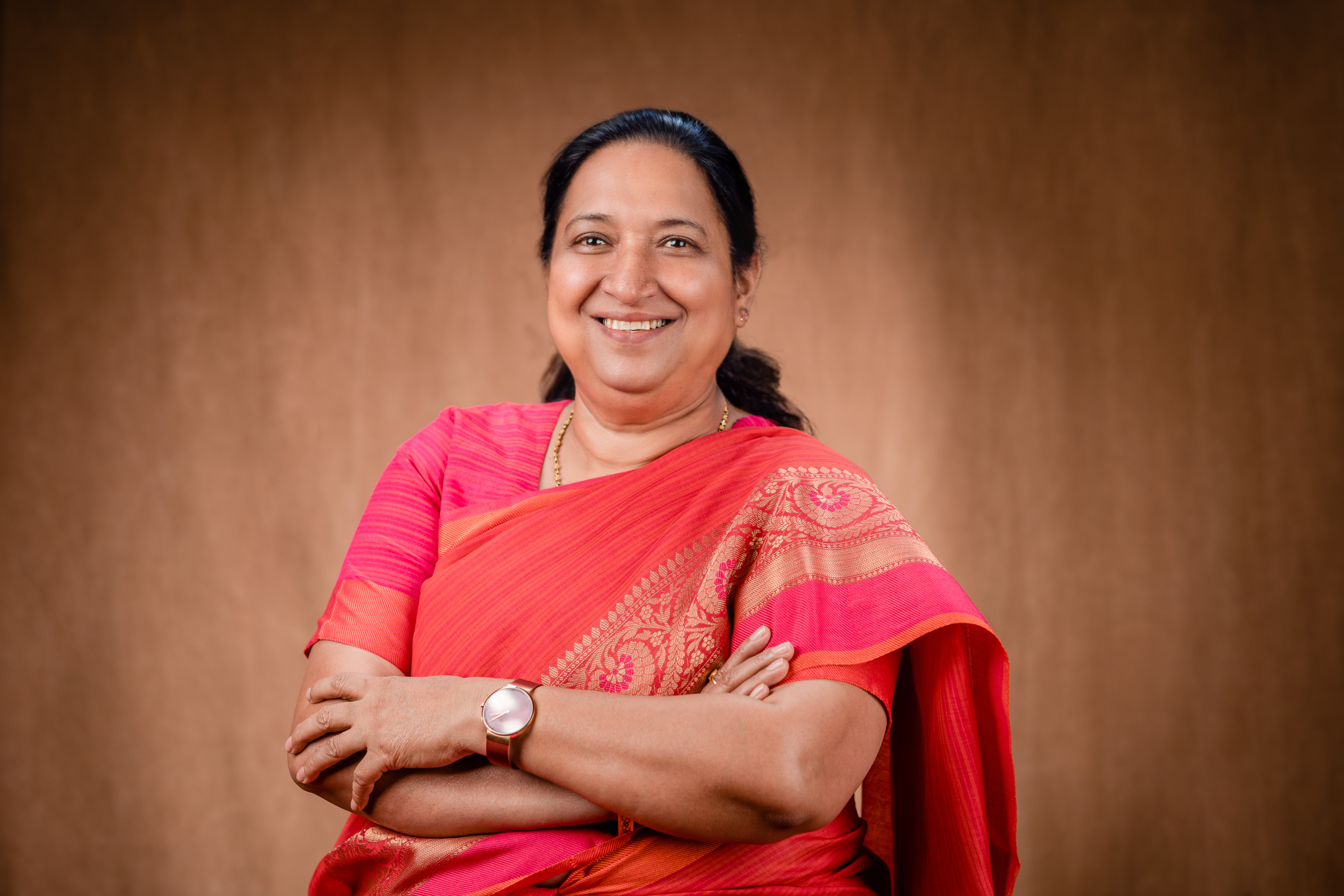

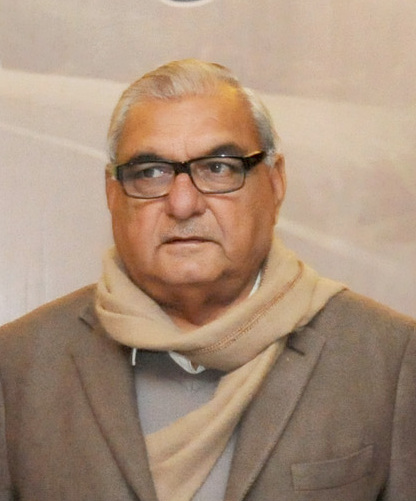
	First party	Second party	Third party
Leader	Om Prakash Chautala	Sudha Yadav	Bhupinder Singh Hooda
Party	INLD	BJP	INC
Alliance	NDA	NDA	-
Leader's seat	Did not contest	Mahendragarh	Rohtak (lost)
Last election	4	1	3
Seats won	5	5	0
Seat change	▲1	▲4	▼3
Percentage	28.72%	29.21%	34.93%
Swing	▲2.82%	▲10.32%	▲8.91%
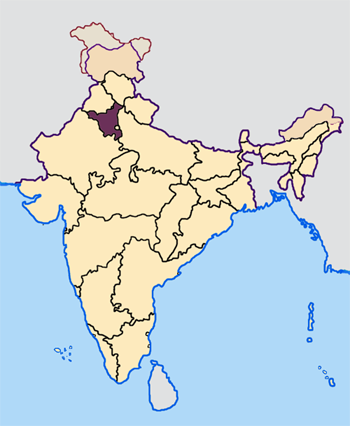
- Haryana
Prime Minister before election
A. B. Vajpayee
BJP
Prime Minister after election
A. B. Vajpayee
BJP

The 1999 Indian general election in Haryana was held for 10 Lok Sabha seats in the state.

== Election schedule ==
The polling schedule for the 1999 General Elections was announced by the Chief Election Commissioner on 11 July 1999.

Poll event	Phase
Poll event	I
Notification date	11 August 1999
Last date for filing nomination	18 August 1999
Scrutiny of nomination	19 August 1999
Last Date for withdrawal of nomination	21 August 1999
Date of poll	5 September 1999
Date of counting of votes/Result	6 October 1999

== Parties and alliances ==
Party/Alliance Name		Flag	Electoral symbol	Leader	Seats contested
NDA	Bharatiya Janata Party			Ramesh Joshi	5
NDA	Indian National Lok Dal			Om Prakash Chautala	5
Indian National Congress				Bhajan Lal Bishnoi	10
Haryana Vikas Party				Bansi Lal	2

== List of Candidates ==
Constituency		NDA		INC+	
#	Name	Party	Candidate	Party	Candidate
1	Ambala (SC)	BJP	Rattan Lal Kataria	INC	Phool Chand Mullana
2	Kurukshetra	INLD	Kailasho Devi	INC	Om Prakash Jindal
3	Karnal	BJP	I. D. Swami	INC	Bhajan Lal
4	Sonepat	BJP	Kishan Singh Sangwan	INC	Chiranji Lal Sharma
5	Rohtak	INLD	Inder Singh	INC	Bhupinder Singh Hooda
6	Faridabad	BJP	Ram Chander Bainda	INC	Zakir Hussain
7	Mahendragarh	BJP	Sudha Yadav	INC	Rao Inderjit Singh
8	Bhiwani	INLD	Ajay Singh Chautala	INC	Dharambir
9	Hisar	INLD	Surender Singh Barwala	INC	Birender Singh
10	Sirsa (SC)	INLD	Dr. Sushil Kumar Indora	INC	Om Parkash

== Result by Party ==
Alliance/ Party		Popular vote			Seats		
Alliance/ Party		Votes	%	±pp	Contested	Won	+/−
NDA	BJP	20,36,797	29.21	▲10.32	5	5	▲1
NDA	INLD	20,02,700	28.72	▲2.42	5	5	▲4
NDA	Total	40,39,497	57.93	Steady	10	10	Steady
INC		24,35,752	34.93	▲8.91	10	0	▼3
HVP		1,88,731	2.71	▼8.89	2	0	▼1
BSP		1,36,330	1.96	▼5.72	3	0	▼1
Others		60,208	0.86	Steady	15	0	Steady
IND		1,12,521	1.61	▲0.37	74	0	Steady
Total		69,73,039	100%	-	114	10	-

== List of Elected MPs ==
Constituency		Winner				Runner Up				Margin	%
#	Name	Candidate	Party	Votes	%	Candidate	Party	Votes	%	Margin	%
1	Ambala (SC)	Rattan Lal Kataria	BJP	357,460	51.63	Phool Chand Mullana	INC	232,982	33.65	124,478	17.98
2	Kurukshetra	Kailasho Devi	INLD	438,701	60.61	Om Parkash Jindal	INC	275,091	38.01	163,610	22.60
3	Karnal	I. D. Swami	BJP	433,733	56.25	Bhajan Lal	INC	285,879	37.07	147,854	19.18
4	Sonepat	Kishan Singh Sangwan	BJP	457,056	69.83	Chiranji Lal	INC	190,918	29.17	266,138	40.66
5	Rohtak	Inder Singh	INLD	366,926	57.93	Bhupinder Singh	INC	222,233	35.09	144,693	22.84
6	Faridabad	Ram Chander Bainda	BJP	367,842	49.34	Zakir Hussain	INC	333,594	44.75	34,248	4.59
7	Mahendragarh	Sudha Yadav	BJP	420,706	56.49	Rao Inderjit Singh	INC	281,566	37.81	139,140	18.68
8	Bhiwani	Ajay Singh Chautala	INLD	381,255	52.01	Dharambir Singh Chaudhary	INC	177,849	24.26	203,406	27.75
9	Hissar	Surender Singh Barwala	INLD	396,540	62.03	Birender Singh	INC	236,088	36.93	160,452	25.10
10	Sirsa (SC)	Dr. Sushil Kumar Indora	INLD	419,278	65.98	Om Parkash	INC	199,552	31.40	219,726	34.58

== Post-election Union Council of Ministers from Haryana ==
#	Name	Constituency	Designation	Department	From	To	Party
1	I. D. Swami	Karnal	MoS	Home Affairs	13 Oct 1999	22 May 2004	BJP

== Assembly segments wise lead of Parties ==
Party	Assembly segments	Position in Assembly (as of 2000 elections)
Indian National Lok Dal	44	47
Bharatiya Janata Party	41	6
Indian National Congress	5	21
Haryana Vikas Party	0	2
Others	0	14
Total	90	
