= 1991 Indian general election in Haryana =

10 seats
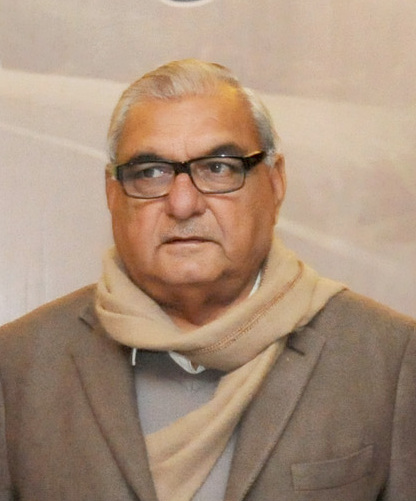

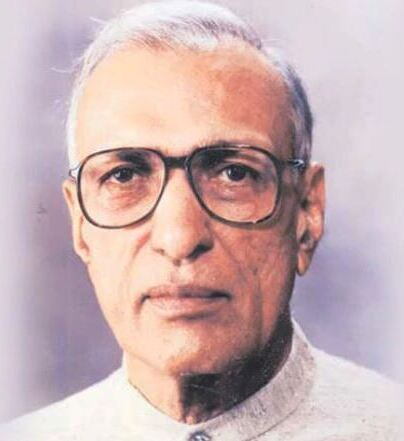

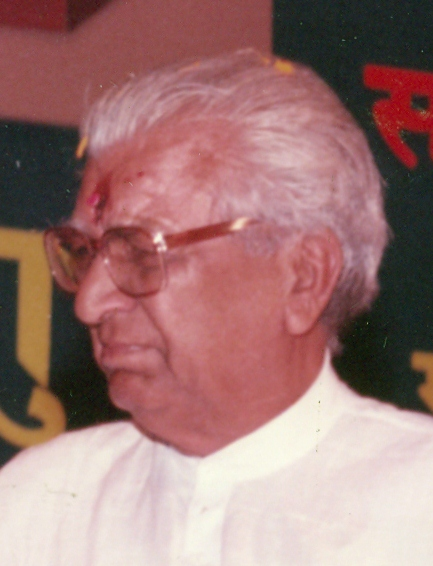
	First party	Second party	Third party
Leader	Bhupinder Singh Hooda	Bansi Lal	Devi Lal
Party	INC	HVP	JP
Leader's seat	Rohtak	Did not contest	Rohtak (lost)
Last election	4	New
Seats won	9	1	0
Seat change	▲5	New
Percentage			25.41
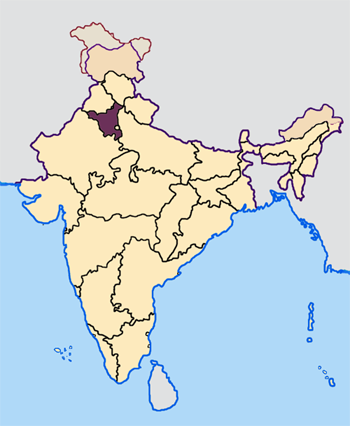
- Haryana
Prime Minister before election
Chandra Shekhar
SJP(R)
Prime Minister after election
A. B. Vajpayee
BJP

The 1991 Indian general election in Haryana, occurred for 10 seats in the state. The Indian National Congress won nine of the 10 Lok Sabha seats in the state.

== Parties and alliances ==
=== Bharatiya Janata Party ===
No.	Party	Flag	Symbol	Leader	Seats contested
1.	Bharatiya Janata Party			Ram Bilas Sharma	10

=== Indian National Congress ===
No.	Party	Flag	Symbol	Leader	Seats contested
1.	Indian National Congress			Kumari Selja	10

=== Haryana Vikas Party ===
No.	Party	Flag	Symbol	Leader	Seats contested
1.	Haryana Vikas Party			Bansi Lal	4

=== Others ===
No.	Party	Flag	Symbol	Leader	Seats contested
1.	Jharkhand Party				10
2.	Janata Dal				7

== List of Candidates ==
Constituency		INC		JP		JD		BJP		HVP	
No.	Name	Party	Candidate	Party	Candidate	Party	Candidate	Party	Candidate	Party	Candidate
1	Ambala (SC)	INC	Ram Prakash	JP	Chand Ram	JD	Shyam Chand	BJP	Suraj Bhan	Did not contest	
2	Kurukshetra	INC	Tara Singh	JP	Shyam Singh	JD	Gurdial Singh	BJP	Shiv Partap Bajaj	Did not contest	
3	Karnal	INC	Chiranji Lal Sharma	JP	Ranjit	JD	Chasham Pal Singh	BJP	Fateh Chand Vij	Did not contest	
4	Sonepat	INC	Dharampal Singh	JP	Kapil Dev	JD	Rajender	BJP	Dharamvir	Did not contest	
5	Rohtak	INC	Bhupender Singh	JP	Devi Lal	Did not contest		BJP	Raj Kumar	HVP	Inder Singh
6	Faridabad	INC	Avtar Singh Bhadana	JP	Cheti Lal Verma	JD	Khurshid Ahmed	BJP	Brahma Singh Tanwar	Did not contest	
7	Mahendragarh	INC	Ram Singh	JP	Birender Singh	Did not contest		BJP	M. L. Yadav	HVP	Naresh
8	Bhiwani	INC	Jai Narain	JP	Hukum Singh	Did not contest		BJP	Ramesh Chander	HVP	Jangbir Singh
9	Hissar	INC	Narain Singh	JP	Jai Parkash	JD	Parma Nand	BJP	Siri Niwas Goel	Did not contest	
10	Sirsa (SC)	INC	Shailja	JP	Het Ram	JD	Sakhi Ram	BJP	Payare Lal Fauji	HVP	Ram Sharan

== Results ==
Party Name	Popular vote			Seats		
Party Name	Votes	%	±pp	Contested	Won	+/−
INC	23,10,003	37.22	▼8.93	10	9	▲5
JP	15,77,389	25.41	Steady	10	0	Steady
JD	7,75,213	12.49	▼26.41	7	0	▼6
BJP	6,31,146	10.17	▲1.86	10	0	Steady
HVP	3,31,794	5.35	Steady	4	1	▲1
BSP	1,11,353	1.79	▲0.17	1	0	Steady
Others	1,29,742	2.09	Steady	21	0	Steady
IND	3,40,153	5.48	▲1.89	135	0	Steady
Total	62,06,793	100%	-	198	10	-

== List of Elected MPs ==
Constituency		Winner				Runner-up				Margin	
Constituency		Candidate	Party	Votes	%	Candidate	Party	Votes	%	Votes	%
1	Ambala (SC)	Ram Prakash Chaudhary	INC	196,406	31.03	Suraj Bhan	BJP	124,464	19.66	71,942	11.37
2	Kurukshetra	Tara Singh	INC	212,783	33.44	Shyam Singh	JP	182,758	28.72	30,025	4.72
3	Karnal	Chiranji Lal Sharma	INC	200,770	32.17	Chasham Pal Singh	JD	145,598	23.33	55,172	8.84
4	Sonepat	Dharam Pal Singh Malik	INC	247,572	42.08	Kapil Dev	JP	202,770	34.46	44,802	7.62
5	Rohtak	Bhupinder Singh Hooda	INC	241,235	44.00	Devi Lal	JP	210,662	38.43	30,573	5.57
6	Faridabad	Avtar Singh Bhadana	INC	268,965	38.84	Chaudhary Khurshid Ahmed	JD	217,443	31.40	51,522	7.44
7	Mahendragarh	Rao Ram Singh	INC	241,808	38.58	Birender Singh	JP	169,820	27.09	71,988	11.49
8	Bhiwani	Jangbir Singh	HVP	210,090	36.25	Jai Narain	INC	179,525	30.98	30,565	5.27
9	Hissar	Narain Singh	INC	233,012	38.37	Jai Parkash	JP	206,818	34.06	26,194	4.31
10	Sirsa (SC)	Selja Kumari	INC	287,927	42.92	Het Ram	JP	188,829	28.15	99,098	14.77
