= Tamil Nadu Landstack =

GIS-based digital land records platform

- Website type: Integrated land records and governance platform
- Available in: Multilingual
- Headquarters: India
- Owners: Ministry of Rural Development, Department of Land Resources
- Creators: Department of Land Resources, Government of India
- Launched: December 31, 2025; 10 months ago
- Current status: Active (pilot)

Tamil Nadu Landstack is the Tamil Nadu pilot deployment of Land Stack, an integrated, GIS-based digital platform for land records in India. Land Stack was launched as a pilot in the Union Territory of Chandigarh and the state of Tamil Nadu on 31 December 2025 by the Ministry of Rural Development under the Digital India Land Record Modernization Programme (DILRMP).

== Background ==
Land Stack was developed by the Department of Land Resources under the Ministry of Rural Development. The platform was launched by Dr. Chandra Sekhar Pemmasani, Minister of State for Rural Development and Communications, on 31 December 2025 in New Delhi. It was launched together with the release of the multilingual Glossary of Revenue Terms (GoRT), which aims to standardise land and revenue terminology across states and union territories.

The initiative was inspired by global best practices from countries including Singapore, the United Kingdom and Finland. It forms part of a national effort to align India's fragmented, historically-rooted land records with a digitised, modern economy.

== Features ==
Land Stack is designed to overcome fragmented land information systems by integrating land, ownership, registration and building data on a single platform. Reported features include:

- GIS-based integration of property and parcel-level land information
- Single-window access to ownership details, deed records, encumbrances and litigation status
- Access to cadastral maps, revenue and registration data
- A unified interface intended to replace multiple departmental portals
- Interoperability across the Revenue, Survey, Registration and Local Bodies departments

The platform is intended to serve citizens, government agencies and lenders.

== Pilot launch ==
Land Stack was launched on a pilot basis in the Union Territory of Chandigarh and the state of Tamil Nadu. Described by the Ministry of Rural Development as the country's first land stack, it is expected to be scaled nationwide as the pilot progresses.

== See also ==
- Digital India Land Record Modernization Programme
- Unique Land Parcel Identification Number
- India Stack
- Patta Chitta
- Ministry of Rural Development (India)
