= National Generic Document Registration System =

Indian government property registration software

- Developer: National Informatics Centre
- Release: 2018; 8 years ago
- Operating system: Web-based
- Available in: English and various Indian languages
- Type: Land registration software
- Website: ngdrs.gov.in

The National Generic Document Registration System (NGDRS), also called e-Registration, is the software used by registration departments in a number of Indian states and union territories for the registration of deeds and documents, mostly property transactions. It was commissioned by the Department of Land Resources in the Ministry of Rural Development and written by the National Informatics Centre (NIC).

The software is one component of the Digital India Land Records Modernization Programme (DILRMP), and the Department of Land Resources promotes it under the slogan "One Nation One Registration Software". Through it a buyer or seller can enter deed details, obtain a valuation, pay stamp duty, book a slot at the sub-registrar's office and later search for the registered document.

== Background ==
Document registration in India is governed by the Registration Act, 1908 but administered by the states, each through its own Inspector General of Registration. States therefore computerised their sub-registrar offices separately and at different times, ending up with incompatible software, data structures and document formats.

DILRMP, approved by the Union Cabinet in August 2008 as the National Land Records Modernization Programme, became a fully centrally funded central sector scheme on 1 April 2016. Computerisation of registration is one of its components, and it was under this head that the Department of Land Resources asked NIC to build a single application that any state could take up. Rather than impose one national system, NIC produced a configurable product, on the reasoning that languages, legal vocabulary and registration statutes vary too much between states for anything else to work.

== History ==
Punjab, Rajasthan and Maharashtra ran the first pilots. In June 2018 Narendra Singh Tomar, then Union Minister for Rural Development, inaugurated the system by video link in every sub-registrar office in the Andaman and Nicobar Islands, along with its adoption in Punjab. Six other states and union territories were migrating at the time, and another five had asked NIC for demonstrations.

Uptake was slow in the first years. NIC recorded seven users as on 31 December 2019: Punjab, the Andaman and Nicobar Islands, Manipur, Jharkhand, Goa, Mizoram and Himachal Pradesh. A national portal and dashboard were launched at Bhumi Samvaad, the ministry's national workshop on DILRMP.

Ladakh took up the system on 11 March 2021 at a launch attended by Union Minister Giriraj Singh and Lieutenant Governor Radha Krishna Mathur. Delhi switched over across all 22 of its sub-registrar offices, and documents registered from January 2024 are searchable on NGDRS rather than on the older Delhi Online Registration Information System (DORIS).

Himachal Pradesh, an early adopter, returned to the system in July 2025 with a pilot branded "My Deed", launched by chief minister Sukhvinder Singh Sukhu on 11 July. Applicants apply online and attend the tehsil office once.

== Design ==
NGDRS runs from one source code base with a common data structure, deployed as a separate cloud-hosted instance for each state, which the state then configures for its own document types, fee schedules, valuation rules and language. Ownership of the data does not pass to the centre; the state Inspector General of Registration remains its custodian under the Registration Act.

States that have kept their own registration software can still push data to the national portal over an interface. Where the system is fully deployed it is usually tied into the state land records database, so that record-of-rights details are pulled in during registration and a mutation reference goes back automatically afterwards; e-stamp certificates are verified and locked at the same time to stop them being reused. NIC has used blockchain in the Maharashtra e-Registration deployment.

Valuation is rule-based and runs off the circle rates loaded for the district, so the stamp duty and fee figures are generated rather than quoted by the counter clerk. Land that cannot be transferred — government land, tribal land, mortgaged land — is flagged and blocked at data entry. Some state instances add standard deed templates, grievance tracking and public dashboards.

Goa and Delhi have both loosened the territorial link between property and office: Goa allows registration anywhere within the district, Delhi at any of its 22 sub-registrar offices regardless of where the property lies.

== Adoption ==
As listed by the Department of Land Resources, eighteen states and union territories run NGDRS: the Andaman and Nicobar Islands, Assam, Bihar, Chhattisgarh, Dadra and Nagar Haveli and Daman and Diu, Goa, Himachal Pradesh, Jammu and Kashmir, Jharkhand, Ladakh, Maharashtra, Manipur, Meghalaya, Mizoram, Delhi, Punjab, Tripura and Uttarakhand.

Thirteen more — Andhra Pradesh, Chandigarh, Haryana, Gujarat, Madhya Pradesh, Odisha, Puducherry, Rajasthan, Sikkim, Tamil Nadu, Telangana, Uttar Pradesh and West Bengal — only share data with the national portal and continue to register documents on their own systems. Counts vary between government sources; Vikaspedia gives 28 states and union territories as having adopted the system in some form.

Each deployment sits on its own domain, generally ngdrs.<state>.gov.in. Uttar Pradesh describes its e-Registration service as NGDRS 3.0.

NIC Manipur's land records and NGDRS work, called Loucha Pathap, won a silver award for district-level e-governance in the north-eastern and hilly states category at the 23rd National Conference on e-Governance in Mumbai in February 2020.

== Limitations ==
Registration is not fully online anywhere. Biometric authentication and execution of the deed still require the parties to appear at the sub-registrar's office, and the department's own material treats presence-less registration with remote authentication as a later stage of the project rather than a current feature. Because stamp duty, fees and much of the procedure remain with the states, the experience differs considerably from one instance to another despite the shared code. Several of the largest states by transaction volume have not migrated at all.

== See also ==
- Digital India Land Record Modernization Programme
- Land registration
- National Informatics Centre
- Svamitva Yojana
