= 1998 Indian general election in Haryana =

- 16 Feb 1998

10 seats
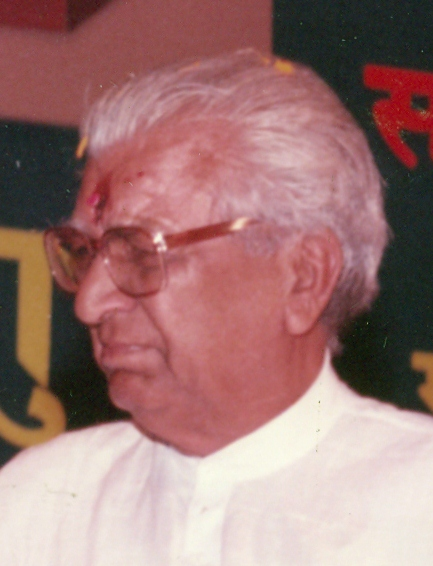

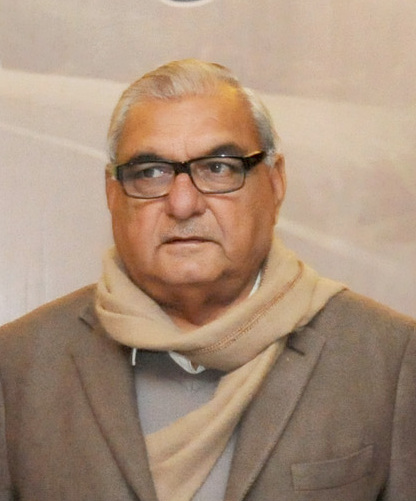
	First party	Second party
Leader	Devi Lal	Bhupinder Singh Hooda
Party	INLD	INC
Leader's seat	Rohtak (lost)	Rohtak
Last election	New	2
Seats won	4	3
Seat change	New	▲1
Percentage	25.90%	26.02%
Swing	New	▲8.91%
	Third party	Fourth party
	BJP	HVP
Party	BJP	HVP
Last election	4	3
Seats won	1	1
Seat change	▼3	▼2
Percentage	18.89%	11.60%
Swing	▲10.32%	▼8.89%
	Fifth party
	BSP
Party	BSP
Last election	0
Seats won	1
Seat change	▲1
Percentage	7.68
Swing	▼5.72%
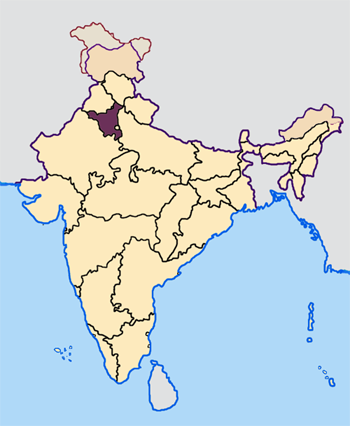
- Haryana
Prime Minister before election
Inder Kumar Gujral
JD
Prime Minister after election
A. B. Vajpayee
BJP

The 1998 Indian general election in Haryana was held for 10 Lok Sabha seats in the state.

== Parties and alliances ==
Party/Alliance Name		Flag	Electoral symbol	Leader	Seats contested
NDA	Bharatiya Janata Party			Ramesh Joshi	6
NDA	Haryana Vikas Party			Bansi Lal	4
Indian National Congress				Kumari Selja	10
Indian National Lok Dal				Om Prakash Chautala	7

== Result by party ==
Alliance/ Party		Popular vote			Seats		
Alliance/ Party		Votes	%	±pp	Contested	Won	+/−
INLD		19,56,087	25.90	Steady	7	4	▲4
INC		19,65,397	26.02	▲3.38	10	3	▲1
NDA	BJP	14,27,086	18.89	▼0.85	6	1	▼3
NDA	HVP	8,75,803	11.60	▼3.59	4	1	▼2
NDA	Total	23,02,889	30.49	▼4.44	10	2	▼5
BSP		5,80,152	7.68	▲1.09	3	1	▲1
SJP(R)		4,02,382	5.33	Steady	5	0	Steady
SHS		1,45,452	1.93	Steady	3	0	Steady
JD		28,513	0.38	▼1.16	4	0	Steady
CPI(M)		25,366	0.34	Steady	1	0	Steady
SP		15,783	0.21	▼0.92	5	0	Steady
CPI		11,270	0.15	Steady	1	0	Steady
Others		26,225	0.33	Steady	13	0	Steady
IND		93,288	1.24	▼9.01	78	0	▼1
Total		75,52,804	100%	-	140	10	-

== List of elected MPs ==
Constituency		Winner				Runner Up				Margin	%
#	Name	Candidate	Party	Votes	%	Candidate	Party	Votes	%	Margin	%
1	Ambala (SC)	Aman Kumar Nagra	BSP	273,792	36.97	Suraj Bhan	BJP	270,928	36.58	2,864	0.39
2	Kurukshetra	Kailasho Devi	INLD	333,387	43.57	Kuldip Sharma	INC	191,867	25.07	141,520	18.50
3	Karnal	Bhajan Lal Bishnoi	INC	327,750	41.14	I. D. Swami	BJP	275,689	34.60	52,061	6.54
4	Sonepat	Kishan Singh	INLD	290,299	41.94	Abhey Ram Dahiya	HVP	152,975	22.10	137,324	19.84
5	Rohtak	Bhupinder Singh Hooda	INC	254,951	38.66	Devi Lal	INLD	254,568	38.61	383	0.05
6	Faridabad	Ram Chander Bainda	BJP	304,022	33.81	Khurshid Ahmad	INC	288,679	32.10	15,343	1.71
7	Mahendragarh	Rao Inderjit Singh	INC	329,126	41.50	Col. Ram Singh	BJP	260,990	32.91	68,136	8.59
8	Bhiwani	Surender Singh	HVP	361,257	48.17	Ajay Singh	INLD	351,546	46.87	9,711	1.30
9	Hissar	Surender Singh Barwala	INLD	260,271	35.89	Om Parkash Jindal	HVP	179,780	24.79	80,491	11.10
10	Sirsa (SC)	Dr. Sushil Kumar Indora	INLD	309,451	42.33	Selja Kumari	INC	215,521	29.48	93,930	12.85
