= Politics of Haryana =

Politics of the state in northern India

The key political players in Haryana state in northern India are the ruling Bharatiya Janata Party, the Indian National Congress, the Indian National Lok Dal, The Sarvahit Party and smaller parties like the Haryana Janhit Congress and the Bahujan Samaj Party partaking in various state (Haryana Legislative Assembly) and national level (Lok sabha) elections in Haryana.

The dynastic political clans of Haryana are often criticised for the infamous self-serving politics of the Aaya Ram Gaya Ram turncoats who notoriously engage in frequent party switching, political horse trading, unholy political alliances, political corruption, political cronyism, nepotistic-dynastic rule, which serves their clan more than it serves their voters and people of Haryana they are ought to serve.

== National politics ==
There are ten constituencies of the Lok Sabha (lower house in the Parliament of India). The Bhiwani-Mahendragarh constituency was announced to be formed in 2007 as a result of the report by the Delimitation Commission of India. The previous Bhiwani and Mahendragarh were merged to form this one.

== State politics ==
The Haryana Legislative Assembly has 90 seats.

== Elections ==
The various national and state elections in Haryana are as follows:

- List of Lok Sabha elections in Haryana
- List of Vidhan Sabha elections in Haryana

== See also ==
- List of constituencies of the Lok Sabha - Haryana
- List of constituencies of the Haryana Legislative Assembly
