= Ministry of Rural Development (India) =

Government ministry of India

Minister of Rural Development
- ग्रामीण विकास मंत्री Grāmīṇ Vikās Mantrī
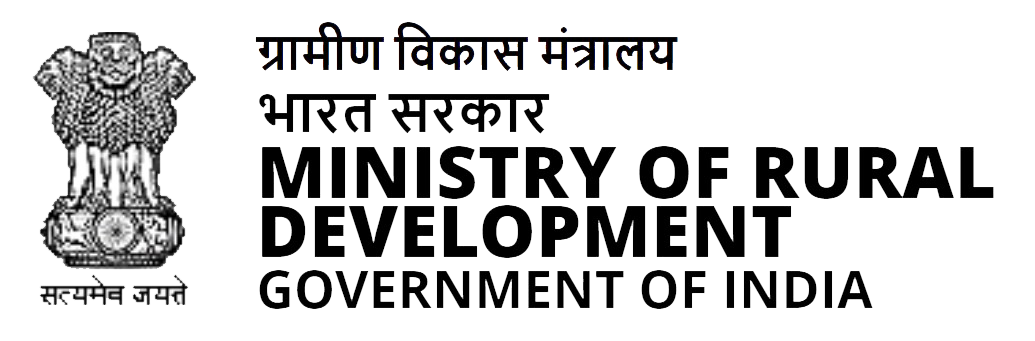
- Logo of The Ministry of Rural Development

- Flag of The Republic of India

- Incumbent; Shivraj Singh Chouhan since 10 June 2024
- Ministry of Rural Development
- Member of: Cabinet of India
- Reports to: President of India; Prime Minister of India; Parliament of India
- Appointer: President of India; on the recommendation of the Prime Minister of India
- Formation: 1999
- First holder: Rao Birender Singh
- Deputy: Kamlesh Paswan; Chandra Sekhar Pemmasani (as Ministers of State)
- Website: rural.gov.in

The Ministry of Rural Development, a branch of the Government of India, is entrusted with the task of accelerating the socio-economic development of rural India. Its focus is on special rural grants for health and education, piped filtered drinking water programs, public and affordable housing programs, public work programs and grants for rural roads and infrastructure. It also provides special grants to rural local bodies.

The current minister is Shivraj Singh Chouhan who has been in office since 10 June 2024, while the ministers of state are Chandra Sekhar Pemmasani and Kamlesh Paswan.

== History ==
On 31 March 1952, the Community Projects Administration was established under the Planning Commission to manage programs for community development. The community development program, which began on 2 October 1952 marked a significant step in rural development history. Over time, this program went through several changes and was overseen by different government bodies.

In October 1974, the Department of Rural Development was created as part of the Ministry of Food and Agriculture. Then, on 18 August 1979, it became its own Ministry called the Ministry of Rural Reconstruction. This ministry was later renamed the Ministry of Rural Development on 23 January 1982. In January 1985, it was once again made a department under the Ministry of Agriculture and Rural Development, which was later renamed the Ministry of Agriculture in September 1985.

On 5 July 1991, the department was upgraded back to a Ministry called the Ministry of Rural Development. A new department, the Department of Wasteland Development was established under this Ministry on 2 July 1992. In March 1995, the Ministry was renamed as Ministry of Rural Areas and Employment, which included three departments namely the Department of Rural Employment and Poverty Alleviation, Rural Development and Wasteland Development.

Again, in 1999 the Ministry of Rural Areas and Employment was once again renamed as Ministry of Rural Development.

== Departments ==
The ministry has two departments: the Department of Rural Development and the Department of Land Resources. Each is headed by a senior civil servant designated as the Secretary of the Department. Anita Choudhry is the secretary of Land Resources and Shri Shailesh Kumar Singh, is the secretary of the Ministry of Rural Development.

=== Department of Rural Development ===
The department run several national-level schemes:

- Pradhan Mantri Gram Sadak Yojana (PMGSY) for rural roads development
- Deendayal Antyodaya Yojana - National Rural Livelihood mission (DAY-NRLM) for self employment
- Mahatma Gandhi National Rural Employment Guarantee Act (MGNREGA) for rural employment
- Pradhan Mantri Awaas Yojana - Gramin for rural housing,
- National Institute of Rural Development (NIRD)

=== Department of Land Resources ===
The Department of Land Resources runs three national-level programs:

- Pradhan Mantri Krishi Sinchayee Yojna (Watershed Development Component)
- Digital India Land Record Modernization Programme
- Neeranchal National Watershed Project
- Other Programmes
  - GIZ led pilot Land Use Planning and Management Project
  - Ease of Doing Business - Initiatives

It has the following divisions:

- Land Regulations
- Watershed Management and Development
- Programme Monitoring & Evaluation (PME)

== Cabinet Ministers ==
- ^{†} Died in office

Portrait	Minister (Birth-Death) Constituency	Term of office			Political party	Ministry	Prime Minister
Portrait	Minister (Birth-Death) Constituency	From	To	Period	Political party	Ministry	Prime Minister
Minister of Rural Reconstruction
	Bhanu Pratap Singh (born 1935); Rajya Sabha MP for Uttar Pradesh (Minister of State, I/C)	30 July 1979	14 January 1980	168 days	Janata Party (Secular)	Charan	Charan Singh
	Rao Birender Singh (1921–2000); MP for Mahendragarh	20 January 1980	23 January 1982	2 years, 3 days	Indian National Congress	Indira IV	Indira Gandhi
Minister of Rural Development
	Rao Birender Singh (1921–2000); MP for Mahendragarh	23 January 1982	29 January 1983	1 year, 6 days	Indian National Congress	Indira IV	Indira Gandhi
	Harinath Mishra; MP for Darbhanga (Minister of State, I/C)	29 January 1983	2 August 1984	1 year, 186 days	Indian National Congress	Indira IV	Indira Gandhi
	Mohsina Kidwai (1932–2026); MP for Meerut (Minister of State, I/C until 31 Oct 1984)	2 August 1984	31 October 1984	90 days	Indian National Congress	Indira IV	Indira Gandhi
	Mohsina Kidwai (1932–2026); MP for Meerut (Minister of State, I/C until 31 Oct 1984)	4 November 1984	31 December 1984	57 days	Indian National Congress	Rajiv I	Rajiv Gandhi
	Buta Singh (1934–2021); MP for Jalore	31 December 1984	25 September 1985	268 days	Indian National Congress	Rajiv II	Rajiv Gandhi
Ministry merged with the Ministry of Agriculture during this interval
	P. V. Narasimha Rao (1921–2004); MP for Nandyal (Prime Minister)	21 June 1991	11 June 1995	3 years, 355 days	Indian National Congress	Rao	P. V. Narasimha Rao
Minister of Rural Areas and Employment
	Jagannath Mishra (1937–2019); Rajya Sabha MP for Bihar	11 June 1995	16 May 1996	340 days	Indian National Congress	Rao	P. V. Narasimha Rao
	Atal Bihari Vajpayee (1924–2018); MP for Lucknow (Prime Minister)	16 May 1996	1 June 1996	16 days	Bharatiya Janata Party	Vajpayee I	Atal Bihari Vajpayee
	Kinjarapu Yerran Naidu (1957–2012); MP for Srikakulam	1 June 1996	19 March 1998	1 year, 291 days	Telugu Desam Party	Deve Gowda	H. D. Deve Gowda
	Kinjarapu Yerran Naidu (1957–2012); MP for Srikakulam	1 June 1996	19 March 1998	1 year, 291 days	Telugu Desam Party	Gujral	Inder Kumar Gujral
	Babagouda Patil (1945–2021); MP for Belgavi (Minister of State, I/C)	20 March 1998	13 October 1999	1 year, 207 days	Bharatiya Janata Party	Vajpayee II	Atal Bihari Vajpayee
Minister of Rural Development
	Sundar Lal Patwa (1924–2016); MP for Narmadapuram	13 October 1999	30 September 2000	353 days	Bharatiya Janata Party	Vajpayee III	Atal Bihari Vajpayee
	M. Venkaiah Naidu (born 1948); Rajya Sabha MP for Karnataka	30 September 2000	1 July 2002	1 year, 274 days	Bharatiya Janata Party	Vajpayee III	Atal Bihari Vajpayee
	Shanta Kumar (born 1934); MP for Kangra	1 July 2002	6 April 2003	279 days	Bharatiya Janata Party	Vajpayee III	Atal Bihari Vajpayee
	Ananth Kumar (1959–2018); MP for Bangalore South	6 April 2003	24 May 2003	48 days	Bharatiya Janata Party	Vajpayee III	Atal Bihari Vajpayee
	Kashiram Rana (1938–2012); MP for Surat	24 May 2003	22 May 2004	364 days	Bharatiya Janata Party	Vajpayee III	Atal Bihari Vajpayee
	Raghuvansh Prasad Singh (1946–2020); MP for Vaishali	23 May 2004	22 May 2009	4 years, 364 days	Rashtriya Janata Dal	Manmohan I	Manmohan Singh
	C. P. Joshi (born 1950); MP for Bhilwara	28 May 2009	19 January 2011	1 year, 236 days	Indian National Congress	Manmohan II	Manmohan Singh
	Vilasrao Deshmukh (1945–2012); Rajya Sabha MP for Maharashtra	19 January 2011	12 July 2011	174 days	Indian National Congress	Manmohan II	Manmohan Singh
	Jairam Ramesh (born 1954); Rajya Sabha MP for Andhra Pradesh	12 July 2011	26 May 2014	2 years, 318 days	Indian National Congress	Manmohan II	Manmohan Singh
	Gopinath Munde (1949–2014); MP for Beed	27 May 2014	3 June 2014^{[†]}	7 days	Bharatiya Janata Party	Modi I	Narendra Modi
	Nitin Gadkari (born 1957); MP for Nagpur	4 June 2014	9 November 2014	158 days	Bharatiya Janata Party	Modi I	Narendra Modi
	Birender Singh (born 1946); Rajya Sabha MP for Haryana	9 November 2014	5 July 2016	1 year, 239 days	Bharatiya Janata Party	Modi I	Narendra Modi
	Narendra Singh Tomar (born 1957); MP for Gwalior (until 2019); MP for Morena (from 2019)	5 July 2016	7 July 2021	5 years, 2 days	Bharatiya Janata Party	Modi I	Narendra Modi
	Narendra Singh Tomar (born 1957); MP for Gwalior (until 2019); MP for Morena (from 2019)	5 July 2016	7 July 2021	5 years, 2 days	Bharatiya Janata Party	Modi II	Narendra Modi
	Giriraj Singh (born 1957); MP for Begusarai	7 July 2021	9 June 2024	2 years, 338 days	Bharatiya Janata Party	Modi II	Narendra Modi
	Shivraj Singh Chouhan (born 1959); MP for Vidisha	10 June 2024	Incumbent	2 years, 131 days	Bharatiya Janata Party	Modi III	Narendra Modi

== Ministers of State ==
Portrait	Minister (Birth-Death) Constituency	Term of office			Political party	Ministry	Prime Minister
Portrait	Minister (Birth-Death) Constituency	From	To	Period	Political party	Ministry	Prime Minister
Minister of State for Rural Reconstruction
	R. V. Swaminathan; MP for Sivaganga	24 November 1980	23 January 1982	2 years, 3 days	Indian National Congress	Indira IV	Indira Gandhi
	Baleshwar Ram (1928–2015); MP for Rosera	16 January 1982	23 January 1982	7 days	Indian National Congress	Indira IV	Indira Gandhi
Minister of State for Rural Development
	R. V. Swaminathan; MP for Sivaganga	23 January 1982	29 January 1983	1 year, 6 days	Indian National Congress	Indira IV	Indira Gandhi
	Baleshwar Ram (1928–2015); MP for Rosera	23 January 1982	29 January 1983	1 year, 6 days	Indian National Congress	Indira IV	Indira Gandhi
	Gaddam Venkatswamy (1929–2014); MP for Peddapalli	21 June 1991	2 July 1992	1 year, 42 days	Indian National Congress	Rao	P. V. Narasimha Rao
	Uttambhai Patel (1927–2018); MP for Valsad	21 June 1991	2 July 1992	1 year, 42 days	Indian National Congress	Rao	P. V. Narasimha Rao
	Gaddam Venkatswamy (1929–2014); MP for Peddapalli; Minister of State, Rural Development	2 July 1992	18 January 1993	200 days	Indian National Congress	Rao	P. V. Narasimha Rao
	Uttambhai Patel (1927–2018); MP for Valsad; Minister of State, Rural Development	2 July 1992	11 June 1995	2 years, 344 days	Indian National Congress	Rao	P. V. Narasimha Rao
	Colonel; Rao Ram Singh (Retd.) (1925–2012); MP for Mahendragarh; Minister of State, Wasteland Development	2 July 1992	11 June 1995	2 years, 344 days	Indian National Congress	Rao	P. V. Narasimha Rao
	Rameshwar Thakur (1925–2015); Rajya Sabha MP for Bihar; Minister of State, Rural Development	18 January 1993	22 December 1994	1 year, 338 days	Indian National Congress	Rao	P. V. Narasimha Rao
Minister of State for Rural Areas and Employment
	Uttambhai Patel (1927–2018); MP for Valsad; Minister of State, Rural Development	11 June 1995	16 May 1996	340 days	Indian National Congress	Rao	P. V. Narasimha Rao
	Colonel; Rao Ram Singh (Retd.) (1925–2012); MP for Mahendragarh; Minister of State, Wasteland Development	11 June 1995	30 March 1996	293 days	Indian National Congress	Rao	P. V. Narasimha Rao
	Vilas Muttemwar (born 1949); MP for Nagpur; Minister of State, Rural Employment and Poverty Alleviation	15 September 1995	16 May 1996	244 days	Indian National Congress	Rao	P. V. Narasimha Rao
	Chandradeo Prasad Verma (1921–2005); MP for Arrah	1 June 1996	19 March 1998	1 year, 291 days	Janata Dal	Deve Gowda	H. D. Deve Gowda
	Chandradeo Prasad Verma (1921–2005); MP for Arrah	1 June 1996	19 March 1998	1 year, 291 days	Janata Dal	Gujral	Inder Kumar Gujral
Minister of State for Rural Development
	A. Raja (born 1963); MP for Perambalur	13 October 1999	30 September 2000	353 days	Dravida Munnetra Kazhagam	Vajpayee III	Atal Bihari Vajpayee
	Subhash Maharia (born 1957); MP for Sikar	13 October 1999	29 January 2003	3 years, 108 days	Bharatiya Janata Party	Vajpayee III	Atal Bihari Vajpayee
	Rita Verma (born 1953); MP for Dhanbad	30 September 2000	1 September 2001	336 days	Bharatiya Janata Party	Vajpayee III	Atal Bihari Vajpayee
	Annasaheb M. K. Patil (born 1939); MP for Erandol	1 September 2001	22 May 2004	2 years, 264 days	Bharatiya Janata Party	Vajpayee III	Atal Bihari Vajpayee
	Krishnam Raju (1940–2022); MP for Narasapuram	29 January 2003	22 May 2004	1 year, 114 days	Bharatiya Janata Party	Vajpayee III	Atal Bihari Vajpayee
	Suryakanta Patil (born 1948); MP for Hingoli	23 May 2004	22 May 2009	4 years, 364 days	Nationalist Congress Party	Manmohan I	Manmohan Singh
	Ale Narendra (1946–2014); MP for Medak	23 May 2004	24 August 2006	2 years, 93 days	Telangana Rashtra Samithi	Manmohan I	Manmohan Singh
	Chandra Sekhar Sahu (born 1950); MP for Berhampur	24 October 2006	22 May 2009	2 years, 210 days	Indian National Congress	Manmohan I	Manmohan Singh
	Pradeep Jain Aditya (born 1962); MP for Jhansi	28 May 2009	26 May 2014	4 years, 363 days	Indian National Congress	Manmohan II	Manmohan Singh
	Sisir Adhikari (born 1941); MP for Kanthi	28 May 2009	22 September 2012	3 years, 117 days	Trinamool Congress	Manmohan II	Manmohan Singh
	Agatha Sangma (born 1980); MP for Tura	28 May 2009	27 October 2012	3 years, 152 days	Nationalist Congress Party	Manmohan II	Manmohan Singh
	Lalchand Kataria (born 1968); MP for Jaipur Rural	31 October 2012	26 May 2014	1 year, 146 days	Indian National Congress	Manmohan II	Manmohan Singh
	Upendra Kushwaha (born 1960); MP for Karakat	27 May 2014	9 November 2014	167 days	Rashtriya Lok Samta Party	Modi I	Narendra Modi
	Sudarshan Bhagat (born 1969); MP for Lohardaga	9 November 2014	5 July 2016	1 year, 239 days	Bharatiya Janata Party	Modi I	Narendra Modi
	Ram Kripal Yadav (born 1957); MP for Pataliputra	5 July 2016	30 May 2019	2 years, 329 days	Bharatiya Janata Party	Modi I	Narendra Modi
	Niranjan Jyoti (born 1967); MP for Fatehpur	31 May 2019	9 June 2024	5 years, 9 days	Bharatiya Janata Party	Modi II	Narendra Modi
	Faggan Singh Kulaste (born 1959); MP for Mandla	7 July 2021	9 June 2024	2 years, 338 days	Bharatiya Janata Party	Modi II	Narendra Modi
	Kamlesh Paswan (born 1976); MP for Bansgaon	10 June 2024	Incumbent	2 years, 131 days	Bharatiya Janata Party	Modi III	Narendra Modi
	Chandra Sekhar Pemmasani (born 1976); MP for Guntur	10 June 2024	Incumbent	2 years, 131 days	Telugu Desam Party	Modi III	Narendra Modi
