= Neer Nirmal Pariyojana =

- नीर निर्मल परियोजना
- Mission statement: Improve piped water supply and sanitation services for selected rural communities in the target states through decentralized service delivery systems
- Location: Uttar Pradesh, Bihar, Assam and Jharkhand
- Owner: World Bank; Ministry of Drinking Water and Sanitation (MoDWS); Government of India
- Country: India
- Prime Minister(s): Narendra Modi (2014)
- Established: 2013
- Status: Active

The Neer Nirmal Pariyojana (NNP) is a World Bank assisted and funded project undertaken by the Government of India. It was started with an aim to improve piped water supply and sanitation services for selected rural communities in the target states through decentralized service delivery systems. The scheme is being undertaken in the four Indian states, Uttar Pradesh, Bihar, Assam and Jharkhand. It is a joint initiative by the Ministry of Drinking Water and Sanitation (MoDWS), Government of India and the World Bank.

It was launched in 2013 as the Rural Water Supply and Sanitation Project for Low Income States (RWSS-LIS), but later it was renamed as Neer Nirmal Pariyojana.

== See also ==
- Neeranchal National Watershed Project
- Ministry of Jal Shakti
