= 1996 Indian general election in Haryana =

Haryana state elections

10 seats
	First party	Second party	Third party
	BJP	HVP	INC
Leader		Bansi Lal	Bhajan Lal
Party	BJP	HVP	INC
Last election	0	1	9
Seats won	4	3	2
Seat change	▲4	▲2	▼7
	Fourth party
Party	Independent
Last election	0
Seats won	1
Seat change	▲1
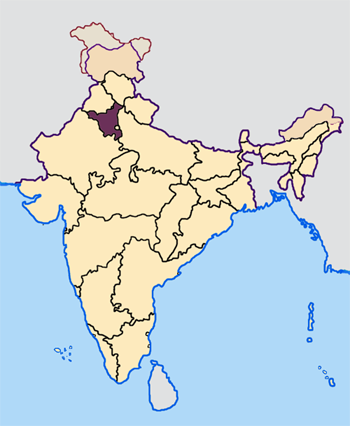
- Haryana
Prime Minister before election
P. V. Narasimha Rao
INC
Prime Minister after election
A. B. Vajpayee
BJP

The 1996 Indian general election in Haryana was held for 10 Lok Sabha seats in the state.

== Parties and alliances ==
Party/Alliance Name		Flag	Electoral symbol	Leader	Seats contested
NDA	Bharatiya Janata Party			Ramesh Joshi	6
NDA	Haryana Vikas Party			Bansi Lal	4
Indian National Congress				Kumari Selja	10
Samata Party				George Fernandes	10
All India Indira Congress (Tiwari)				N. D. Tiwari	8

== List of Candidates ==
Constituency		NDA		INC		SAP		AIIC(T)	
No.	Name	Party	Candidate	Party	Candidate	Party	Candidate	Party	Candidate
1	Ambala (SC)	BJP	Suraj Bhan	INC	Sher Singh Kadyan	SAP	Balwant Singh	AIIC(T)	S. C. Dhosiwal
2	Kurukshetra	HVP	Om Parkash Jindal	INC	Tara Singh	SAP	Kalasho Devi	AIIC(T)	Jagdeep Singh Cheema
3	Karnal	BJP	Ishwar Dayal Swami	INC	Chiranji Lal Sharma	SAP	Shyam Singh Rana	AIIC(T)	Shamsher Singh Gogi
4	Sonepat	HVP	Abhey Ram Dahiya	INC	Dharam Pal Singh Malik	SAP	Rijak Ram	AIIC(T)	Bimla Mor
5	Rohtak	BJP	Pardeep Kumar	INC	Bhupender	SAP	Devi Lal	Did not contest	
6	Faridabad	BJP	Ram Chander	INC	Avtar Singh Bhadana	SAP	Shantvir Vashist	AIIC(T)	Rati Ram s/o Ammi
7	Mahendragarh	BJP	Ram Singh	INC	Rao Birender Singh	SAP	Kanwar Singh Kalwari	AIIC(T)	Raj Dahiya
8	Bhiwani	HVP	Surender Singh	INC	Jangbir Singh	SAP	Gopi Ram Vashistha	AIIC(T)	Bhola Ram
9	Hisar	HVP	Jai Parkash	INC	Surjeet Singh	SAP	Gauri Shanker	AIIC(T)	Vijay Kumar
10	Sirsa (SC)	BJP	Hans Raj Hans	INC	Selja Kumari	SAP	Sushil Kumar	Did not contest	

== Results ==
=== Results by Party/Alliance ===
Alliance/ Party		Popular vote			Seats		
Alliance/ Party		Votes	%	±pp	Contested	Won	+/−
NDA	BJP	15,02,723	19.74	▲9.57	6	4	▲4
NDA	HVP	11,56,322	15.19	▲9.84	4	3	▲2
NDA	Total	26,59,045	34.93	Steady	10	7	Steady
INC		17,23,087	22.64	▼14.58	10	2	▼7
SAP		14,47,340	19.01	Steady	10	0	Steady
BSP		5,01,958	6.59	▲4.80	6	0	Steady
AIIC(T)		1,71,005	2.25	Steady	8	0	Steady
JD		1,16,845	1.54	▼10.95	8	0	Steady
SP		86,172	1.13	Steady	3	0	Steady
Others		1,26,069	1.64	Steady	29	0	Steady
IND		7,80,122	10.25	▲4.77	210	1	▲1
Total		76,11,643	100%	-	294	10	-

== List of Elected MPs ==
Constituency		Winner				Runner Up				Margin	%
#	Name	Candidate	Party	Votes	%	Candidate	Party	Votes	%	Margin	%
1	Ambala (SC)	Suraj Bhan	BJP	253,555	31.77	Sher Singh	INC	166,408	20.85	87,147	10.92
2	Kurukshetra	Om Parkash Jindal	HVP	292,172	36.45	Kalasho Devi	SAP	240,395	29.99	51,777	6.46
3	Karnal	Ishwar Dayal Swami	BJP	338,013	42.20	Chiranji Lal Sharma	INC	146,148	18.25	191,865	23.95
4	Sonepat	Arvind Kumar	IND	231,552	33.07	Rijaq Ram	SAP	182,012	26.00	49,540	7.07
5	Rohtak	Bhupender	INC	198,154	31.71	Devi Lal	SAP	195,490	31.28	2,664	0.43
6	Faridabad	Ram Chander	BJP	292,294	35.76	Avtar Singh Bhadana	INC	230,778	28.23	61,516	7.53
7	Mahendragarh	Ram Singh	BJP	265,034	33.45	Rao Birender Singh	INC	216,999	27.39	48,035	6.06
8	Bhiwani	Surender Singh	HVP	406,454	55.66	Jangbir Singh	INC	181,271	24.82	225,183	30.84
9	Hissar	Jai Parkash	HVP	306,402	42.32	Gauri Shanker	SAP	131,750	18.20	174,652	24.12
10	Sirsa (SC)	Selja	INC	275,459	33.50	Sushil Kumar	SAP	260,312	31.66	15,147	1.84
