= Hira Singh Chinaria =

Indian politician and agriculturist (1895–1955)

Hira Singh Chinaria (17 September 1895 – 7 May 1955) was an Indian politician and agriculturist, who conducted research on agriculture in dry conditions. He led the Praja Mandal movement in Jind State, and was elected to the 1st Lok Sabha. Hira Singh died in the chamber of parliament in 1955.

== Early life ==
Chinaria was born on 17 September 1895, in Kalayana village, Dadri Tehsil. He was the son of Risaldar Man Singh. He studied at Middle School in Bhiwani and then up to matric level at Rewari Government High School. He was a skilled hockey player.

He married Draupdi in 1911, the couple would have six sons and four daughters. In 1913 he joined the Jind State Service, where he served for five years. After leaving the Jind State Service, he dedicated himself to writing books on farming without irrigation under dry conditions. He worked for one year at sanitary inspector in Ambala, but was forced to resign after resisting authority of a European supervisor.

Chinaria continued his research and experiments on dry condition agriculture, and after some time he got support from the Jind government for a successful experiment at a plot of 25 acres. He published several books on agriculture in Hindi. He also obtained 2.5 million Indian rupees for a scheme to create a cement company in 1934 (a venture later taken over the Dalmia-Jain group).

== Praja Mandal movement ==
Chinaria resigned from government service in 1939, and joined the Praja Mandal movement. He was elected president of the Jind State Praja Mandal. Hira Singh was arrested in 1940, and held in detention under Defence of India Rules. He was held in detention until 1943, then re-arrested in same year and released in 1945.

He was a member of the All India States People's General Council between 1945 and 1947. He was elected a Member of the Legislative Assembly of Jind State in 1946, and served as the Minister of Food, Agriculture and Industries in the state popular government 1947–1948. He was the Leader of the Praja Mandal Assembly Party in the Jind State Legislative Assembly until 1948.

== After Independence ==
He was a member of the All India Congress Committee from 1948 and 1951. He was a member of the PEPSU Pradesh Congress Committee and its Working Committee. He was also a member of the PEPSU Hindi Sahitya Sammelan ('PEPSU Hindi Literary Conference').

Chinaria was elected to the Lok Sabha (lower house of the parliament of India) in the 1952 election, standing as the Indian National Congress candidate in the Mohindergarh constituency. He obtained 57,290 votes (31.73%). Hira Singh died in the Lok Sabha chamber on 7 May 1955, just after finishing a speech on the Hindu Succession Bill. He collapsed in his seat and died immediately. He was the first incumbent Lok Sabha member to die in the chamber since Independence.
