= Sudha Yadav =

Indian politician

20th Governor of Karnataka
- Incumbent
- Assumed office 16 October 2026
- Chief Minister: D. K. Shivakumar
- Preceded by: Thawar Chand Gehlot

Member of BJP Parliamentary Board
- In office 17 August 2022 – 12 October 2026
- Preceded by: Nitin Gadkari; Shivraj Singh Chauhan

Member, National Commission of Backward Classes
- In office 28 February 2019 – 27 February 2022

Member of Parliament (13th Loksabha)
- In office 1999–2004
- Preceded by: Rao Inderjit Singh
- Succeeded by: Rao Inderjit Singh
- Constituency: Mahendragarh

Personal details
- Born: 16 October 1965 (age 61) Motla Kalan, Punjab (now in Haryana), India
- Party: Bharatiya Janta Party
- Spouse: Sukhbir Singh Yadav
- Children: 2
- Education: Roorkee University
- Occupation: Political and Social Worker, educationist
- As of 9 April, 2009

Sudha Yadav (born 16 October 1965) is an Indian politician who is currently serving as Governor of Karnataka since 16 October 2026. A former member of the Parliamentary Board of the Bharatiya Janata Party.

== Career ==
Sudha Yadav served as a member of the 13th Lok Sabha from 1999 until 2004 from her elected seat at Mahendragarh, Haryana.

On 3 July 2015, she was appointed the National In-Charge of the BJP OBC Morcha. She served as a member of the National Commission for Backward Classes for the government of India from 2019 to 2022.

On 17 August 2022, she became a member of the Parliamentary Board of the BJP. She is the second woman to hold the position, after Sushma Swaraj.

== Personal life ==
Sudha Yadav obtained her MSc in Chemistry in 1987 from the Indian Institute of Technology, Roorkee (IIT Roorkee), where she went on to obtain her PhD in Chemistry in 1992. She is the recipient of the President's Guide award.

Her husband, Sukhbir Singh Yadav of the Border Security Force, died in the Kargil War. She has two children.

== 1999 Lok Sabha Elections ==
In 1999, the current Prime Minister of India, Narendra Modi, then in-charge of the Haryana BJP, proposed Sudha Yadav as a candidate for the general election. It was her first year in politics. The BJP fielded her as their candidate and she defeated Rao Inderjit Singh by 1.39 lakh (139,000) votes.

She lost the subsequent elections in 2004 and 2009.

== Parliamentary career ==
- Member of Parliament, Lok Sabha (1999-2004)
- Member, Parliamentary Standing Committee on Defence (1999-2000)
- Member, Official Language Committee (1999-2000)
- Member, Hindi Salahkar Samiti of the Ministry of Civil Aviation(1999-2000)
- Member, Consultative Committee, Ministry of Communications (2000–04)
- Member, Parliamentary Standing Committee on Empowerment of Women (2000–01)
