= Rao Ram Singh =

Indian politician (1925–2012)

Col.(Rtd.) Ram Singh Yadav

Member of Parliament
- Preceded by: Rao Birender Singh
- Succeeded by: Rao Inderjit Singh
- Constituency: Mahendragarh Lok Sabha constituency
- In office 1991–1998

Personal details
- Born: 9 August 1925 Sadat Nagar, Kosali, Haryana, India
- Died: 30 January 2012 (aged 86) Medanta, Gurgaon, Haryana, India
- Party: Indian National Congress
- Spouse: Sharada Devi
- Children: Sanjay Yadav, Sandhya Yadav, Vinita Yadav
- Occupation: Retired Soldier, Agriculture

Ram Singh (1925-2012) was politician from Haryana.

== Life and political career ==
Ram Singh served in the Indian army. In 1977, he participated in the Rewari assembly constituency for the first time on the Janata Party ticket. In the very first political innings, he got the post of Minister of Education for Haryana. In 1978 he was made the speaker of Haryana Vidhan Sabha. In the 1982 assembly elections, he contested as an independent after not getting a Congress ticket and won the Rewari seat of Haryana Vidhan Sabha for the second time in a row. After winning, he rejoined the Congress and became the Transport Minister of Haryana. He won the Lok Sabha elections from Mahendragarh defeating ex-Chief Minister of Haryana Rao Birendra Singh. In 1991 and 1992, as a Minister of State in the Union Council of Ministers, he got the responsibility of Wasteland Development. He died on 30 January 2012.

Singh died in Medanta Medicity Hospital on 31 January 2012.
