= Ahir College Rewari =

College in Rewari, Haryana, India

- Established: 1945
- Academic affiliations: Maharshi Dayanand University, Indira Gandhi University
- Students: more than 3000
- Location: Near Rao Tularam chowk, Rewari, Haryana, India; 28°11′36″N 76°36′26″E
- Website: ahircollege.ac.in

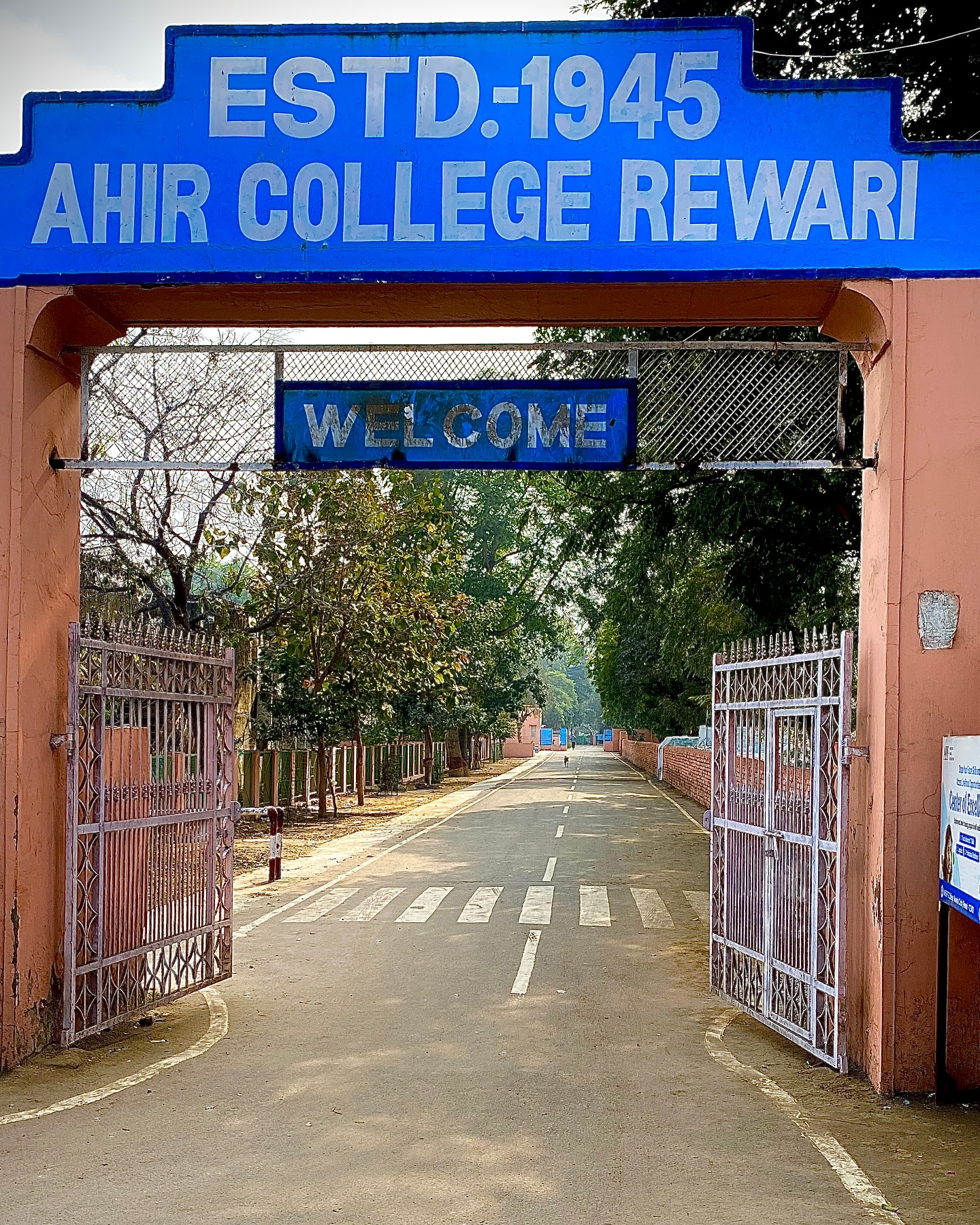
Ahir college, Rewari established by Rao Chaajuram(Dharuhera), Rao Sohanlal(Saharanwas) and Rao Pohap Singh (Palhawas) with Rao Balbir Singh.

Ahir College Rewari is a college in Rewari, Haryana, India. It was established before India's independence. At that time Rewari was the only education hub. The Department of Science of Ahir College Rewari is also notable, in particular for Science Studies.

== Introduction ==
Ahir College Rewari is a co-educational institution of higher learning. The college was founded in 1945. It was initially affiliated to the Panjab University. It is currently under Maharshi Dayanand University, sometimes called MD University, Rohtak.

== Students in various activities ==
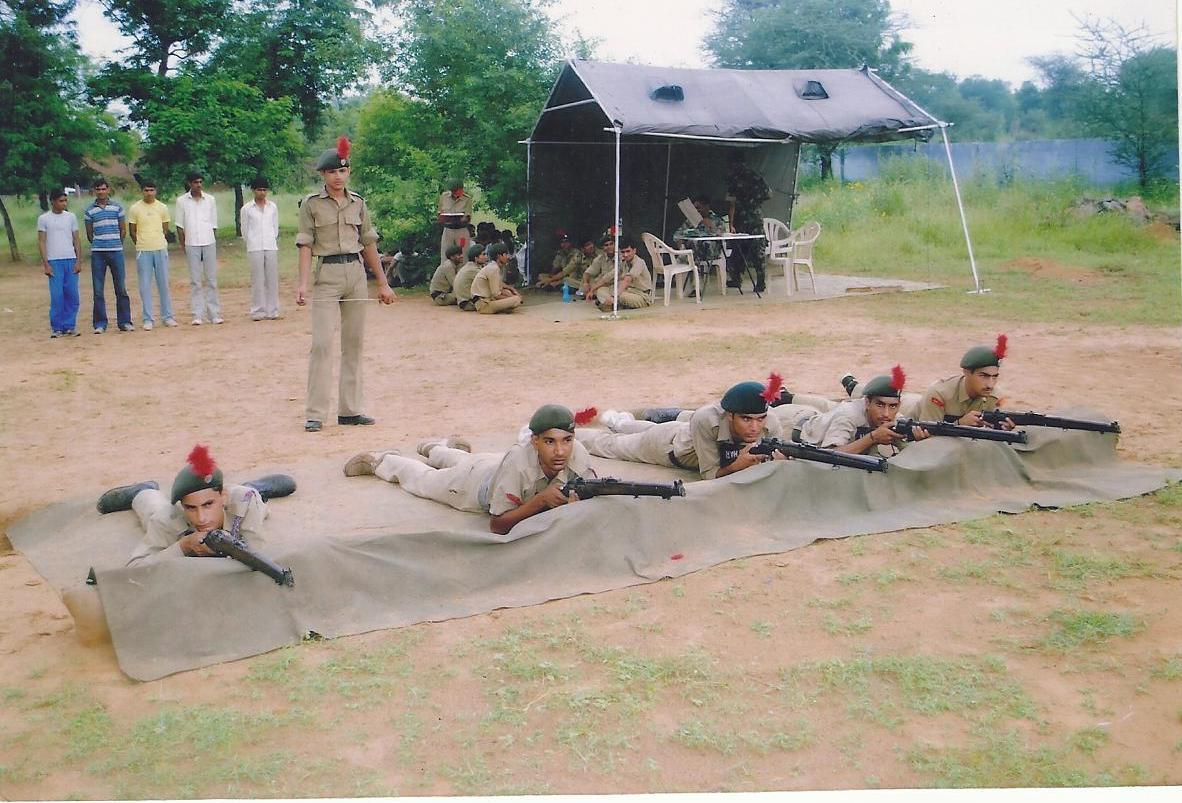
ncc camp

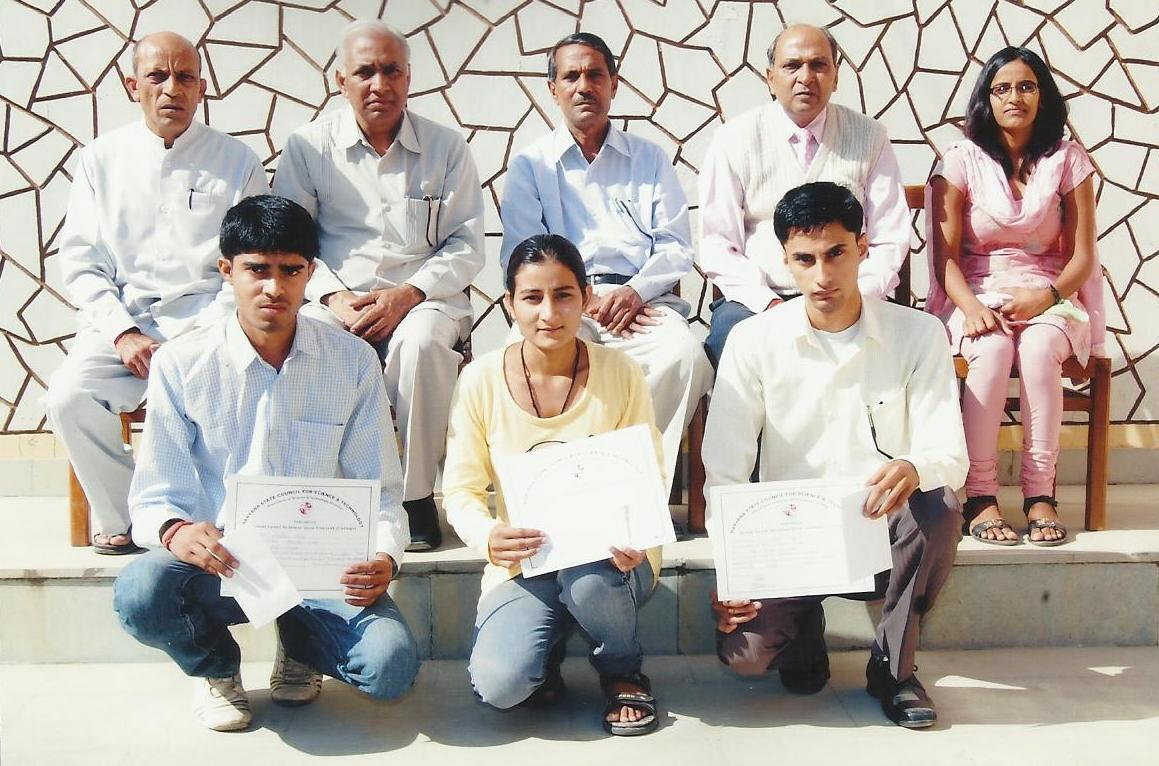
science quiz winner

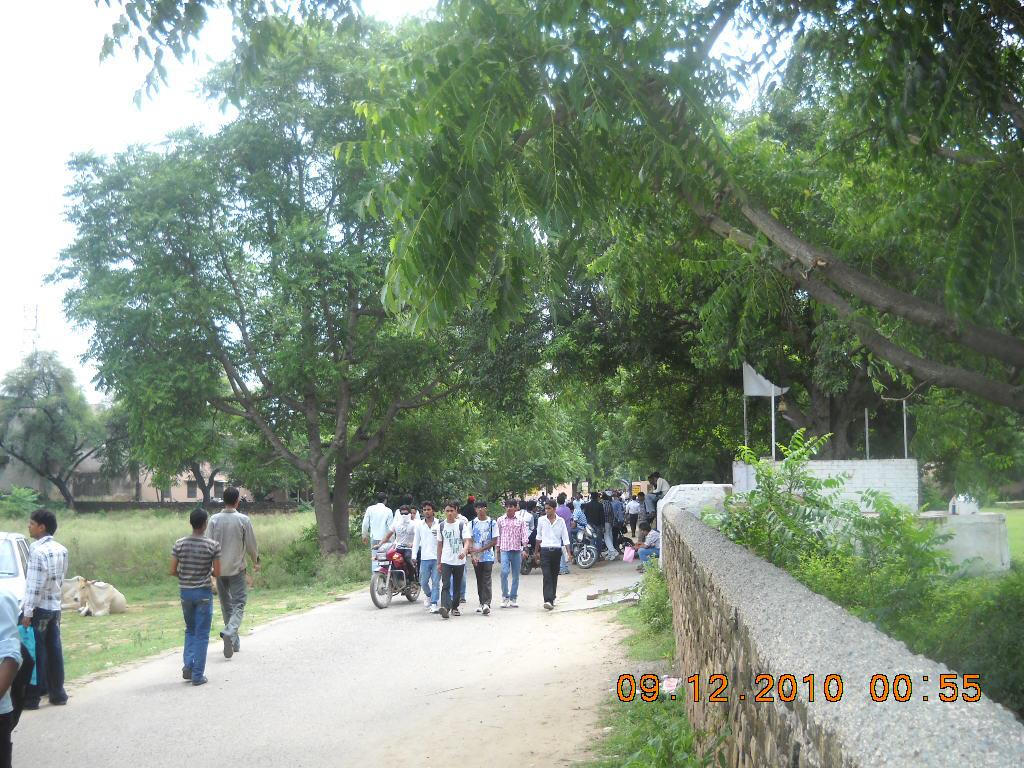
the road
