= Neeranchal National Watershed Project =

The Neeranchal National Watershed Project (NNWP) is a World Bank assisted project undertaken by the Government of India to support the Integrated Watershed Management Program (IWMP) for the improvement and conservation of water resources. The project started in 2016 and will continue until 2022.

The Ministry of Rural Development will implement the project and support the Pradhan Mantri Krishi Sinchayi Yojana in water management. Gujarat, Madhya Pradesh, Chhattisgarh, Rajasthan, Telangana, Andhra Pradesh, Jharkhand, and Maharashtra are the chosen states for project implementation. The cost of the total project is Rs. 2142 crore, of which 50% is funded by the World Bank.
