= Rao Inderjit Singh =

Indian politician (born 1951)

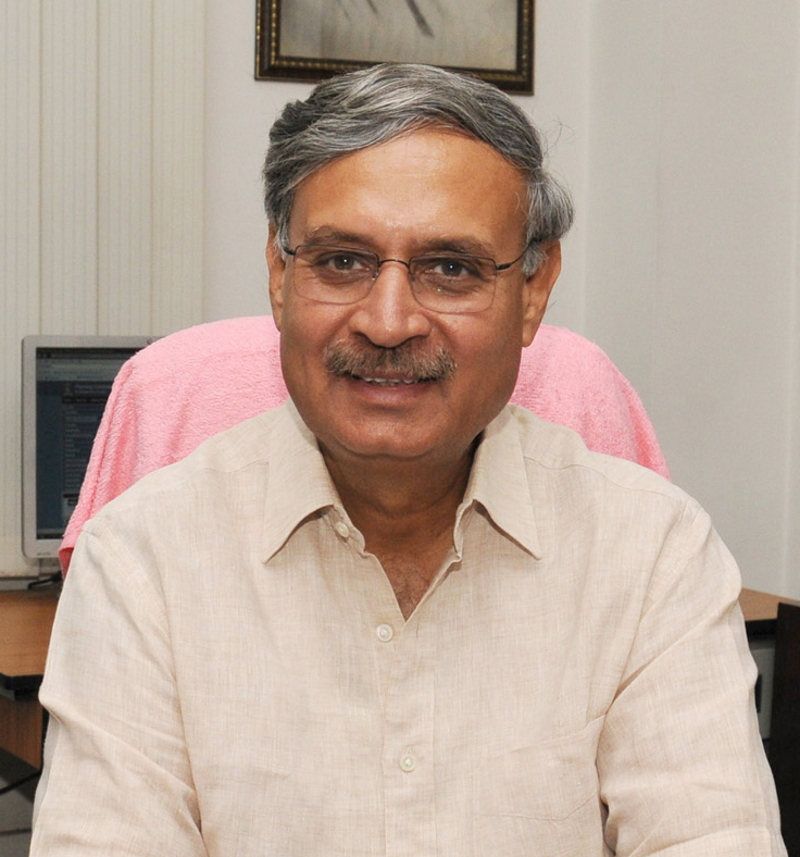
- Singh in May 2014

Union Minister of State for Culture
- Incumbent
- Assumed office 10 June 2024
- President: Ramnath Kovind; Droupadi Murmu
- Minister: Gajendra Singh Shekhawat
- Preceded by: Meenakshi Lekhi

17 Union Minister of State (Independent Charge) for Statistics & Programme Implementation and Planning
- Incumbent
- Assumed office 30 May 2019
- Prime Minister: Narendra Modi
- Preceded by: D. V. Sadananda Gowda
- In office 26 May 2014 – 9 November 2014
- Prime Minister: Narendra Modi
- Preceded by: Srikant Kumar Jena
- Succeeded by: V K Singh

Union Minister of State for Chemicals and Fertilisers
- In office 3 September 2017 – 30 May 2019
- Minister: Ananth Kumar (till 2018); D. V. Sadananda Gowda (from 2018)
- Preceded by: Mansukh L. Mandaviya
- Succeeded by: Mansukh L. Mandaviya

Union Minister of State for Corporate Affairs
- Incumbent
- Assumed office 7 July 2021
- Minister: Nirmala Sitharaman
- Preceded by: Anurag Singh Thakur

Member of Parliament, Lok Sabha
- Incumbent
- Assumed office 16 May 2009
- Preceded by: Constituency established
- Constituency: Gurgaon, Haryana
- In office 13 May 2004 – 16 May 2009
- Preceded by: Sudha Yadav
- Succeeded by: Constituency abolished
- Constituency: Mahendragarh, Haryana
- In office 10 March 1998 – 26 April 1999
- Preceded by: Col. Rao Ram Singh
- Succeeded by: Sudha Yadav
- Constituency: Mahendragarh, Haryana

Personal details
- Born: 11 February 1951 (age 75) Rewari, Punjab, India (present-day Haryana)
- Party: Bharatiya Janata Party
- Other political affiliations: Indian National Congress (until April 2014)
- Spouse: Manita Singh (m. 1976)
- Children: 2 (including Arti Singh Rao)
- Parent: Rao Birender Singh (father)
- Education: Hindu College, University of Delhi
- Alma mater: Faculty of Law, University of Delhi
- Occupation: Social worker; politician; agriculturist; lawyer
- Website: Rao Inderjit Singh
- As of 28 March, 2009 Source: [Biodata]

Rao Inderjit Singh (born 11 February 1951) is an Indian politician who is serving as the 17th Minister of Planning, 13th Minister of Statistics and Programme Implementation and minister of state in the ministry of Culture since 2024. He is also a member of the Lok Sabha. He represents the Gurgaon constituency in Haryana and is a member of Bharatiya Janata Party.

== Early life ==
Rao was born in royal family of Rewari (Ahirwal) and is the son of Rao Birendra Singh, who served as a second Chief Minister of Haryana. Rao studied at the Lawrence School, Sanawar and the Faculty of Law, University of Delhi where he took a law degree. He is the great-great grandson of Rao Tula Ram, a freedom fighter of India's first war of independence in 1857. His direct lineage to Rao Tula Ram has no historical evidence because Rao Tula Ram was died in 1863 in Kabul and his family members are nowhere mentioned.

== Political career ==
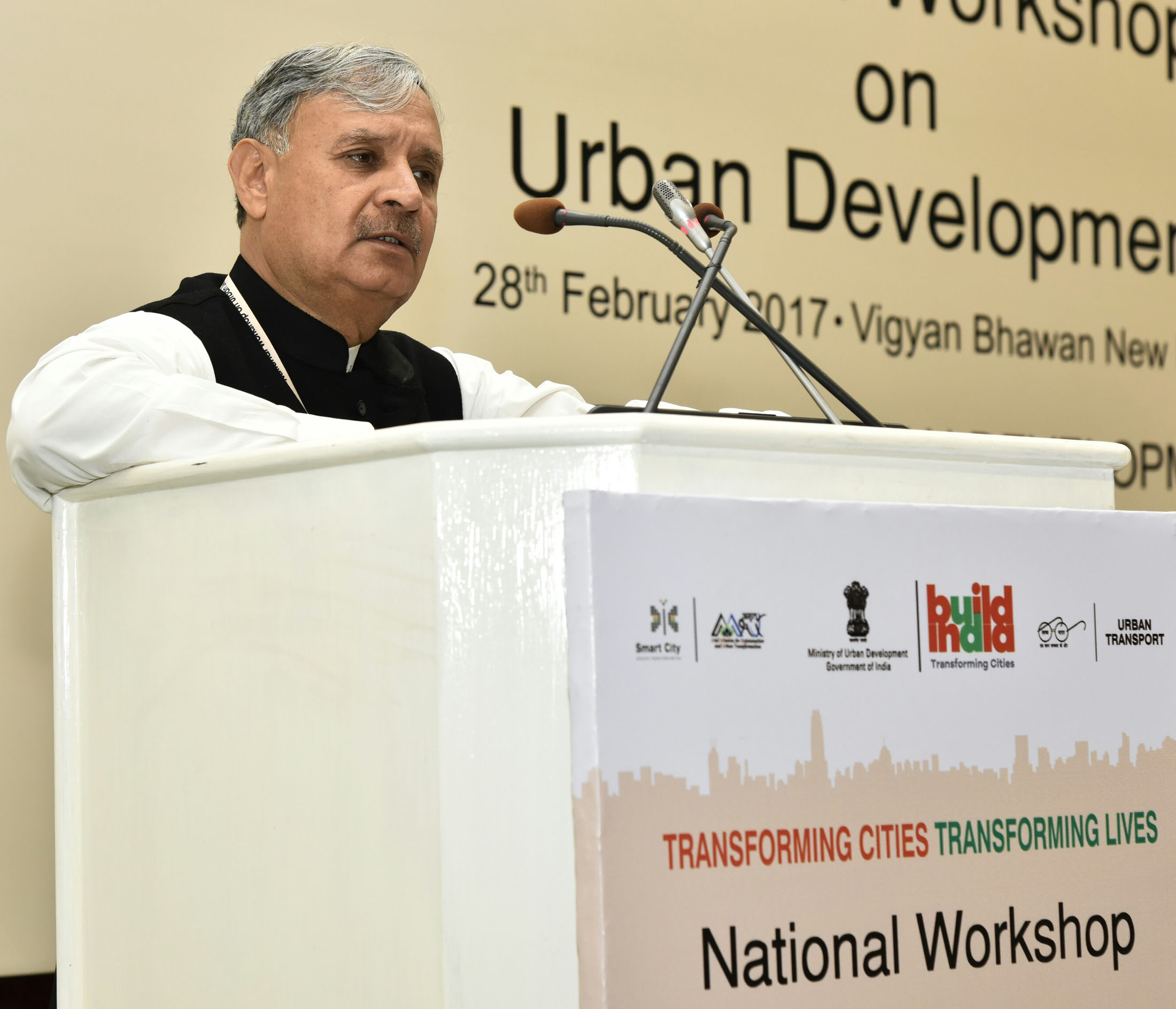
Rao Inderjit Singh addressing at the inauguration of the National Workshop on Urban Development to discuss the major urban sector reforms and six new initiatives with States and UTs, in New Delhi.

Rao was an MLA in the Haryana assembly for four terms, beginning in 1977. From 1982 to 1987, he was a provincial Minister of State responsible for Food and civil supplies.

He was elected to the Lok Sabha as a Member of Parliament in 1998, serving in the parliaments of 1998-1999, 2004–2009, 2014–2019, 2019-2024, 2024–present. From 1991 to 1996, he served as Cabinet Minister for the Environment, Forest, Medical and Technical Education, then as Minister of State for External Affairs (2004–2006) and as Minister of State for Defense Production from 2006 to 2009. He was the chairman of Parliamentary Information technology committee since 2009.

=== Parliamentary Positions in the Lok Sabha ===
#	From	To	Position	Party
1.	1998	1999	Member of Parliament in 12th Lok Sabha from Mahendragarh	INC
2.	2004	2009	Member of Parliament in 14th Lok Sabha from Mahendragarh	INC
3.	2009	2014	Member of Parliament in 15th Lok Sabha from Gurgaon	INC
5.	2014	2019	Member of Parliament in 16th Lok Sabha from Gurgaon	BJP
6.	2019	2024	Member of Parliament in 17th Lok Sabha from Gurgaon	BJP
7.	2024	Incumbent	Member of Parliament in 18th Lok Sabha from Gurgaon	BJP

== Union minister in Modi governments ==
Singh was a Minister of State (Independent Charge) for Statistics and Programme Implementation and Planning in the first Modi government. Singh became the Minister of State for Chemicals and Fertilisers, Minister of State for Corporate Affairs. Singh became the Minister of State (Independent Charge) for Statistics and Programme Implementation and Planning in May 2019.

== Shooting career ==
Rao Inderjit Singh was a member of the Indian shooting Team from 1990 to 2003 and won a Bronze Medal at the Commonwealth Shooting Championship. He was also a National Champion in Skeet for three consecutive years and won three gold medals in the SAF Games.

== Controversies ==
=== Against Bhupinder Singh Hooda ===
Rao Inderjit Singh, who hails from South Haryana, alleged that the Haryana Chief Minister Bhupinder Singh Hooda was developing his own constituency Rohtak at the cost of other parts of the state.

He presented the data procured through RTI to support his allegation: Out of a total of 5,135 announcements of schemes in Haryana, 2,045 were for the three districts of Rohtak, Jhajjar and Sonepat that comprise areas of Hooda's own constituency and that of his son Deepender Singh Hooda. Of the 3,356 completed schemes, 1,560 were from these three districts. On 23 September 2013, he resigned from Congress.

== See also ==
- Birender Singh
- Arti Singh Rao
- Third Modi ministry

Lok Sabha
Preceded by Col.(Retd.) Rao Ram Singh	Member of Parliament for Mahendragarh; 1998 – 1999	Succeeded by Sudha Yadav
Preceded by Sudha Yadav	Member of Parliament for Mahendragarh; 2004– 2008	Succeeded by N/A; Constituency split between Bhiwani-Mahendragarh and Gurgaon constituencies
Preceded by N/A; Constituency created from Mahendragarh and Faridabad constituencies	Member of Parliament for Gurgaon; 2009 – Present	Incumbent
Political offices
Preceded by Srikant Kumar Jena (Minister of State with Independent charge)	Minister of Statistics and Programme Implementation (Minister of State with Independent charge); 26 May 2014 – 9 November 2014	Succeeded by V K Singh (Minister of State with Independent charge)
Preceded by D. V. Sadananda Gowda	Minister of Statistics and Programme Implementation (Minister of State with Independent charge); 30 May 2019 – Present	Incumbent
