= Birender Singh (politician, born 1921) =

2nd Chief Minister of Haryana

Captain Rao Birender Singh
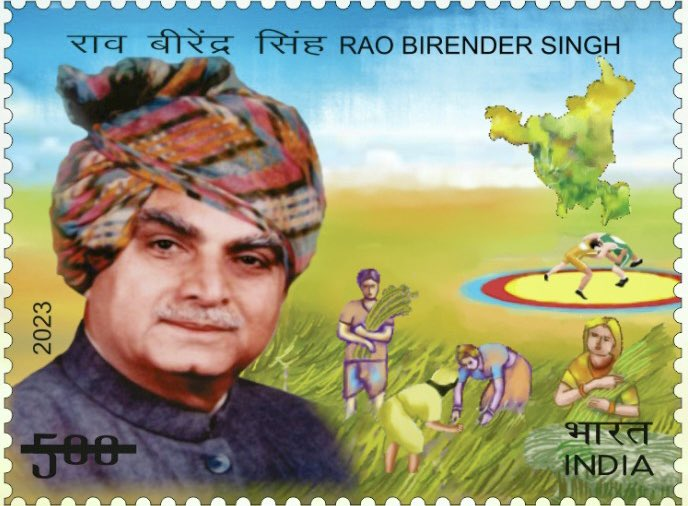
- Singh on a 2023 stamp of India

Chief Minister of Haryana
- In office 24 March 1967 – 20 November 1967
- Governor: Dharma Vira; Birendra Narayan Chakraborty
- Preceded by: Bhagwat Dayal Sharma
- Succeeded by: President's rule; Bansi Lal
Union ministerial positions
Minister of Agriculture
In office 14 January 1980 – 31 October 1984; 4 November 1984–31 December 1984
Prime Minister	Indira Gandhi; Rajiv Gandhi
Preceded by	Brahm Prakash
Succeeded by	Buta Singh
Minister of Rural Development
In office 20 January 1980 – 29 January 1983; Minister of Rural Reconstruction until 23 January 1982
Prime Minister	Indira Gandhi
Preceded by	Bhanu Pratap Singh
Succeeded by	Harinath Mishra
Minister of Irrigation
In office 12 November 1980 – 15 January 1982
Prime Minister	Indira Gandhi
Preceded by	Kedar Pandey
Succeeded by	Kedar Pandey
Minister of Civil Supplies and Cooperation
In office 19 March 1981 – 2 September 1982
Prime Minister	Indira Gandhi
Preceded by	Vidya Charan Shukla
Succeeded by	Bhagwat Jha Azad
Minister of Food and Civil Supplies
In office 31 December 1984 – 25 September 1985
Prime Minister	Rajiv Gandhi
Preceded by	Bhagwat Jha Azad
Succeeded by	Kamakhya Prasad Singh Deo
In office 21 November 1990 – 21 June 1991
Prime Minister	Chandra Shekhar
Preceded by	Chandra Shekhar
Succeeded by	Ministry bifurcated Tarun Gogoi (Food); P. V. Narasimha Rao (Civil Supplies, Consumer Affairs and Public Distribution)

Personal details
- Born: 20 February 1921 Rewari, Punjab, British India
- Died: 30 September 2009 (aged 88) Gurgaon, Haryana, India
- Party: Vishal Haryana Party
- Spouse: Chandra Prabha
- Children: Rao Inderjit Singh; Sudha Rani Rao; Rao Ajit Singh; Rao Yadavendra Singh
- Parent: Rao Bahal Singh
- Relatives: Rao Sheoraj Singh (brother); Rao Ashok Singh (nephew)

Military service
- Allegiance: British India; India
- Branch/service: British Indian Army; Indian Army
- Years of service: (1939–1947) (1950-1951)
- Rank: Captain
- Unit: Territorial Army

Maharaja Rao Birender Singh (20 February 1921 – 30 September 2009) was an Indian politician. He served first as a minister in the state government of Punjab and then as Chief Minister of Haryana, and also served as a minister in Punjab state, Haryana state and the Union cabinet. He also served as the second Speaker (first male speaker) of Haryana state assembly in 1967. He coined an Indian political vocabulary Aaya Ram, Gaya Ram to describe the practice of frequently floor-crossing by legislature.

== Early life ==
Rao was born in 1921 and hailed from a Yaduvanshi Ahir royal family of Rewari, Punjab Province (British India), [now Haryana] in British India. Rao Balbir Singh. He claimed that his family is directly descended from Raja Rao Tularam Singh.

== Career ==
=== East Punjab ===
The years that Birendra Singh spent at St. Stephen's college were the early years of India's independence. The college was situated in New Delhi, the very hub of political activity, and Birendra Singh was drawn to politics by the environment. The first elections in free India were held in 1952 and Birendra Singh contested as an independent candidate from his native Ahirwal region, of which the city of Rewari is the urban center. He lost that election because there were many twists and turns of the politics in the Ahirwal region.

Birendra Singh then joined the Congress Party. Rather than contest elections to the State Legislative Assembly, he got nominated to the State Legislative Council, which is the upper house of the state legislature. His clipped accent and very progressive views were admired by Nehru and many. His royal background and leadership skills helped Nehru in dealing with more recalcitrant royals from the princely states. Thus, Birendra Singh became a member of the State Legislature of the Indian state of undivided Punjab, known informally as East Punjab, without winning an election. He would serve as a nominated member for two successive terms (a total of 12 years) until 1966. During these years, he was made a minister in the Pratap Singh Kairon government and held charge, at various times, of several important ministries like PWD, Irrigation, Power, Revenue and Consolidation, etc.

=== Creation of Haryana ===
When India became independent in 1947, the old province of Punjab was partitioned and East Punjab was retained by India. Several Princely states located on the plains of East Punjab were merged to create the state of PEPSU. Several other princely states in the hills of East Punjab were similarly merged to create the Chief Commissioners' Province of Himachal. The portion which had been directly ruled by the British (rather than by the Maharajas of various princely states) became a third, separate state and received the name Punjab. The Ahirwal region and Rewari lay within this state of Punjab (India), and Birendra Singh was a minister in this state. In the period 1956–66, the three political entities described above were merged and de-merged so that finally, in 1966, the political map of the region as it stands today emerged.

The final step in this process of re-organization was the separation of the Hindi-speaking areas of Punjab into the new state of Haryana, and the creation of the Union Territory of Chandigarh to serve as the common capital of both states. This was accomplished after some acrimony and political maneuvering. Rao Birendra Singh played a prominent role in this process of division. He did so because Ahirwal/Rewari was a Hindi-speaking area in the near vicinity of Delhi and he felt that the Hindi-speaking people of undivided Punjab were not getting their just due in the political dispensation. Therefore, beginning 1962, he spearheaded the campaign for division and achieved success when the state of Haryana was born in November 1966.

=== Defection from Congress ===
After the formation of Haryana in November 1966, Bhagwat Dayal Sharma became Haryana's first Chief Minister, and Birendra Singh was elected the first speaker of the Haryana assembly which was a spin-off from the Punjab Assembly. The first-ever poll to Haryana Vidhan Sabha was held in March 1967. Birender Singh was elected a member of the Haryana Legislative Assembly from the Pataudi assembly constituency as Congress Party's candidate. However, he established the Vishal Haryana Party immediately by defecting from Congress with many MLAs. He was appointed Chief Minister of Haryana on 24 March 1967, replacing Bhagwat Dayal Sharma with his newly formed VHP assuming power.

But the assembly was dissolved, and Haryana placed under President's rule, in November 1967. Congress won the Vidhan Sabha election in 1968 and Bansi Lal became Chief Minister. Birender Singh's VHP came creditable second to Congress in the election.

He was elected to the 5th Lok Sabha in 1971 from the Mahendragarh on the Vishal Haryana Party ticket.

=== Later career ===
In 1977 general election he lost his Mahendragarh Seat as Vishal Haryana Party Candidate. In September 1978 he merged this party with the Congress. In 1980, he was re-elected to the 7th Lok Sabha and he played a prominent role in the formation of the Congress Government in the centre. He served in Ninth Cabinet of India as Cabinet Minister of Agriculture (India), Food, Rural development, Irrigation, and Civil supply. In 1984, he was re-elected to the 8th Lok Sabha from Mahendragarh (Lok Sabha constituency) and became a part of the 10th ministry of India under prime minister Rajiv Gandhi. He later resigned from both the Congress party and the Lok Sabha in 1989 on the issue of Bofors scandal. He joined Janata Dal and was elected to 9th Loksabha in 1989, and became Cabinet minister in the Chander Shekhar's Govt. In 1991 General election he lost Mahendragarh seat.In 1996 General election he contested as INC candidate and lost. He left active politics after 1996. Rao Birender Singh died on 30 September 2009 at the age of 89.

== Army career ==
Rao Birender Singh also enrolled in the Territorial Army during the Second World War.

- In 1947, he resigned from the army as a captain. He came to Rampura and took all the movable and immovable property of Rao Balbir Singh in his possession.
- In the batch of 1949–50, he was selected for Indian Police Service but he did not join that service.
- Again in 1950 to 1951, he joined the Territorial Army as a Commissioned Officer.

== Contribution to Rewari ==
By his efforts, Rewari was made a separate district in 1989. The ruling government was of Chaudhary Om Prakash Chautala who was the Chief Minister.

== Education and welfare of Ahirwal areas ==
Apart from his political service to the Nation Rao Birender Singh also served the backward areas of Ahirwal by establishing many educational institutions like Ahir College Rewari, RBS School-Rewari, Rao Tularam School- Rewari, Rao Tularam Technical College- Delhi. He was the founder of RBS College of Education- Rampura, Rewari.

== Death ==
He died of cardiac arrest in Gurgaon on 30 September 2009.

== See also ==
- List of Rao rulers of Rewari

== External Notes ==
- Dr. Ravindra Singh Yadav & Vijaypal, 1857 ki kranti k purodha: Rao Raja Tularam, 2013, Punit Publication Jaipur, ISBN 978-81-88559-54-1
- Krantidoot Rao Raja Tularam, 1999, Engg. Anil Yadav, Sarita Book House, Delhi.
