= Kailasho Devi =

Indian politician

Kailasho Devi Saini

MP
- Constituency: Kurukshetra

Personal details
- Born: 4 April 1962
- Party: INC
- Spouse: Om Nath Saini
- Profession: Agriculturist, Politician, Social Worker, Teacher, Trader
- Website: kailashosaini.com

Kailasho Devi Saini (born 4 April 1962) is a political and social worker and a member of parliament elected from Kurukshetra constituency in the Indian state of Haryana being an Indian National Lok Dal candidate.

== Early life and education ==
Kailasho was born in Pratapgarh, Kurukshetra. She is married to Om Nath and has a daughter. Kailasho is a M.A in Physical Education and History.

== Career ==
Kailasho has been working to solve the problems of the common man in the districts of Yamunanagar, Kurukshetra and Kaithal in Haryana. She has won many awards for participating in cultural activities during student life.

== Interests ==
Kailasho's interests include practising yoga; listening to music, meditating, and jogging.
