= Digital India Land Record Modernization Programme =

Archive project by the Government of India

The Digital India Land Record Modernization Programme (DILRMP), previously known as the National Land Record Modernization Programme (NLRMP), was launched in 2008 by the Government of India with the purpose to digitize and modernize land records and develop a centralised land record management system. The official land records of mapped and unmapped will enable the government to give access to basic facilities and rights to the land owners. The DILRMP is the amalgamation of two projects: Computerisation of Land Records (CLR) and Strengthening of Revenue Administration and Updating of Land Records (SRA & ULR).

The implementation of the DILRMP programme across states have experienced significant shortcoming, according to the reports submitted by the Indira Gandhi Institute of Development Research (IGIDR), National Institute of Public Finance and Policy (NIPFP), and National Council of Applied Economic Research (NCAER).
