= Mahendragarh Lok Sabha constituency =

Former Lok Sabha constituency in Haryana, India

Coordinates: 28.3°N 76.1°E

Mahendragarh
- Former Lok Sabha constituency

Constituency details
- Country: India
- Region: North India
- State: Haryana
- Established: 1952
- Abolished: 2009

Mahendragarh was a Lok Sabha (parliamentary) constituency in Haryana state in northern India till 2008.

== Assembly segments ==
Mahendragarh Lok Sabha constituency comprised the following Vidhan Sabha (legislative assembly) segments:

Constituency number	Name	Reserved for (SC/ST/None)	District
60	Sohna	None	Gurgaon
61	Gurgaon	None	Gurgaon
62	Pataudi	SC	Gurgaon
85	Bawal	SC	Rewari
86	Rewari	None	Rewari
87	Jatusana	None	Rewari
88	Mahendragarh	None	Mahendragarh
89	Ateli	None	Mahendragarh
90	Narnaul	None	Mahendragarh

== Members of Parliament ==
Year	Member	Party
1952	Hira Singh Chinaria	Indian National Congress
1952	Ram Krishan Gupta	Indian National Congress
1957	Ram Krishan Gupta	Indian National Congress
1962	Yudhvir Singh Chaudhary	Bharatiya Jana Sangh
1967	Gajraj Singh	Indian National Congress
1971	Rao Birender Singh	Vishal Haryana Party
1977	Manoharlal	Bharatiya Lok Dal
1980	Rao Birender Singh	Indian National Congress
1984	Rao Birender Singh	Indian National Congress
1989	Rao Birender Singh	Janata Dal
1991	Rao Ram Singh	Indian National Congress
1996	Rao Ram Singh	Bharatiya Janata Party
1998	Rao Inderjit Singh	Indian National Congress
1999	Sudha Yadav	Bharatiya Janata Party
2004	Rao Inderjit Singh	Indian National Congress
From 2009 onwards: See Bhiwani-Mahendragarh and Gurgaon

== See also ==
- Bhiwani-Mahendragarh (Lok Sabha constituency)
- Mahendragarh district
- List of constituencies of the Lok Sabha
