= Chhatarpur Temple =

Hindu temple in Delhi, India

Chhatarpur Temple, Delhi
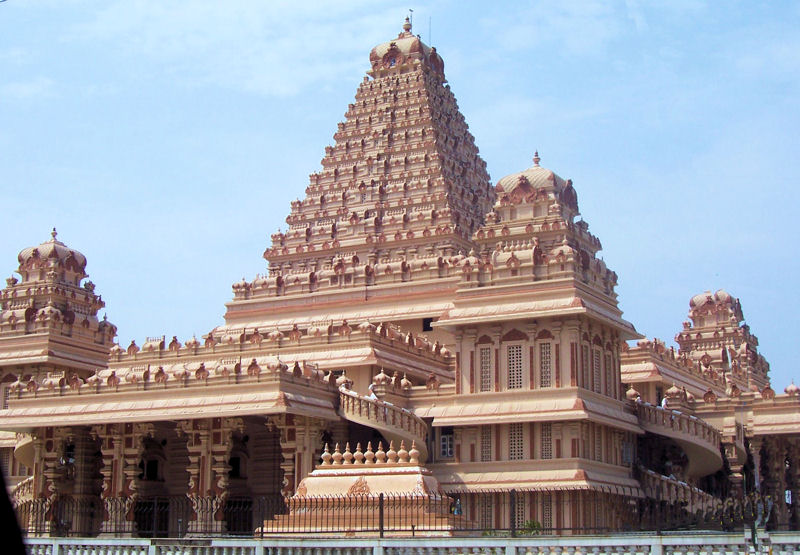
- A South Indian-style temple added in the complex

- A map of Delhi which does not have anything specific marked on it.

Religion
- Affiliation: Hinduism
- District: South Delhi
- Deity: Katyayani (Durga)

Location
- Location: Chhatarpur, South Delhi district, Delhi, India
- State: Union Territory of Delhi
- Country: India
- Coordinates: 28°30′7″N 77°10′46″E

Architecture
- Type: Chola architecture
- Creator: Sant Nagpal
- Completed: 1970

Website
- www.chhattarpurmandir.org

Shri Aadya Katyayani Shakti Peeth is a Hindu temple dedicated to the Hindu deity Katyayani. The entire complex of the temple is spread over a wide area of 28 hectares (70 acres). It is located in Chhatarpur, on the southwestern of Delhi. It is the 2nd largest temple in Delhi, after the Akshardham Temple. The temple is constructed from marble.

The temple was established in 1974, by Baba Sant Nagpal ji, who died in 1998. His samadhi shrine lies in the premises of the Shiv-Gauri Nageshwar Mandir within the temple complex.

Surroundings are an important biodiversity area within the Northern Aravalli leopard wildlife corridor stretching from Sariska Tiger Reserve to Delhi. Historical place around sanctuary are Badkhal Lake (6 km northeast), 10th century ancient Surajkund reservoir and Anangpur Dam, Damdama Lake, Tughlaqabad Fort and Adilabad ruins (both in Delhi). It is contiguous to the seasonal waterfalls in Pali-Dhuaj-Kot villages of Faridabad, the Mangar Bani and the Asola Bhatti Wildlife Sanctuary.

== The complex ==
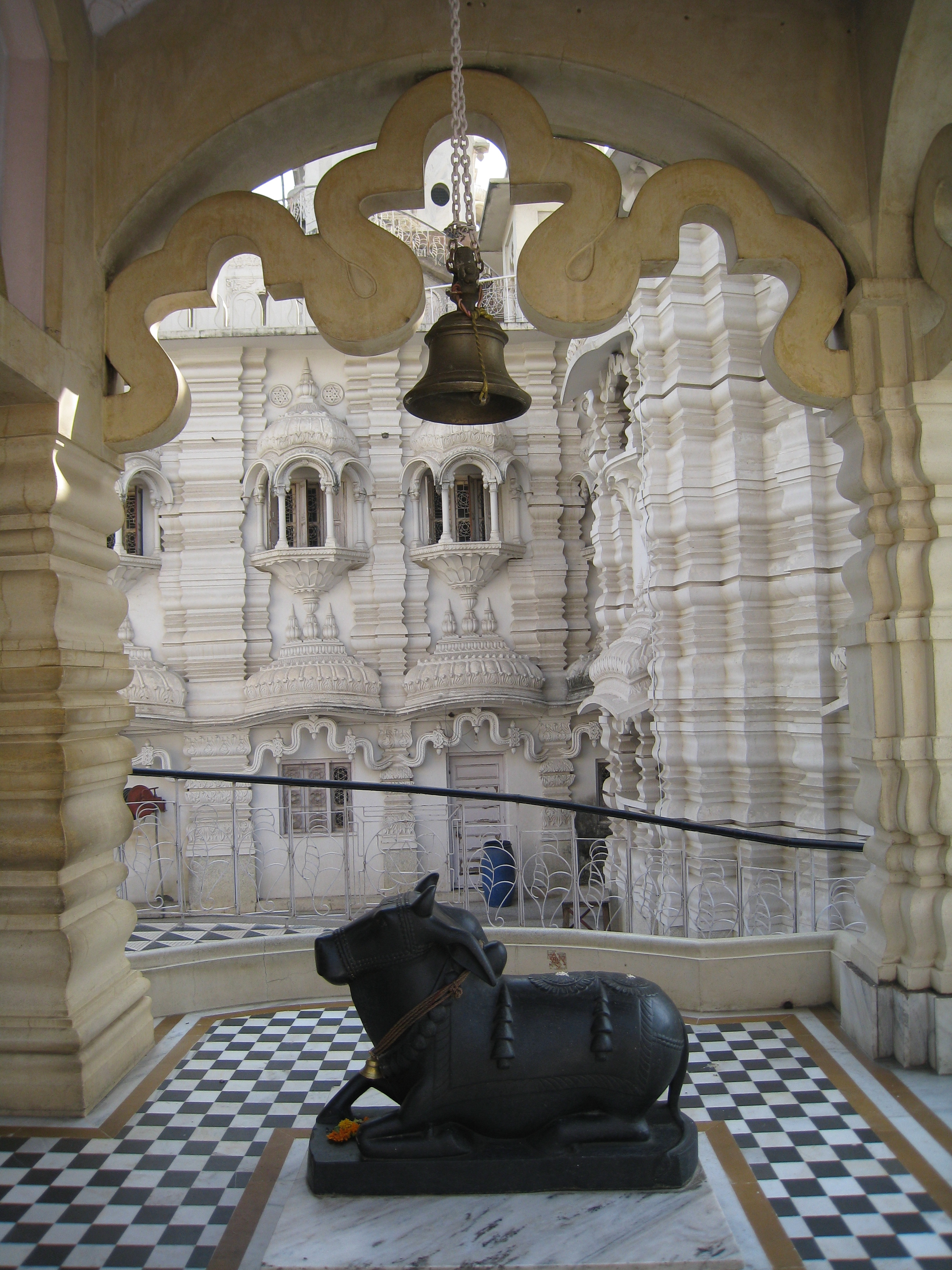
Nandi at Shiva temple, Chhatarpur temple

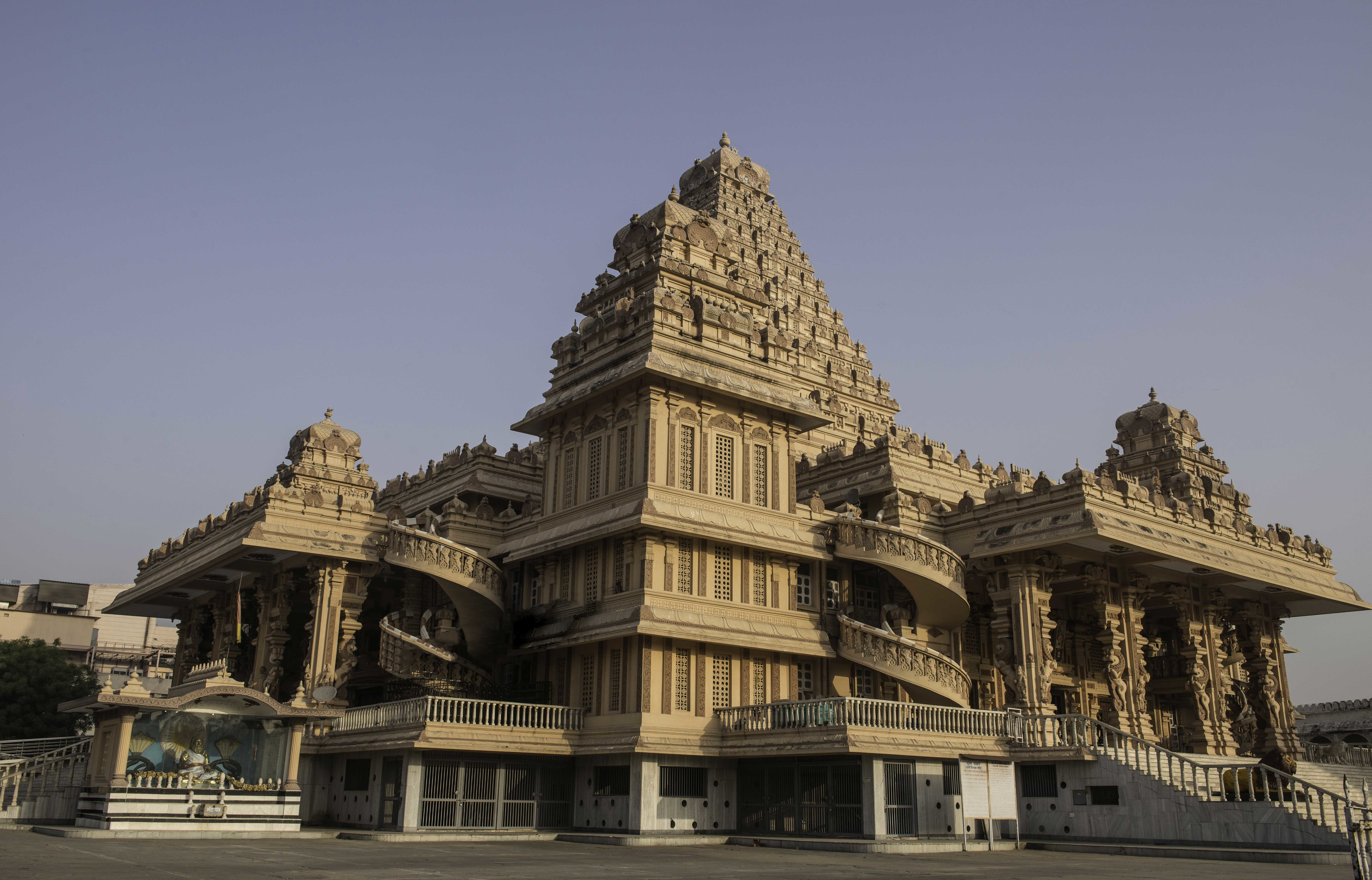
Laxmi Vinayaka Temple

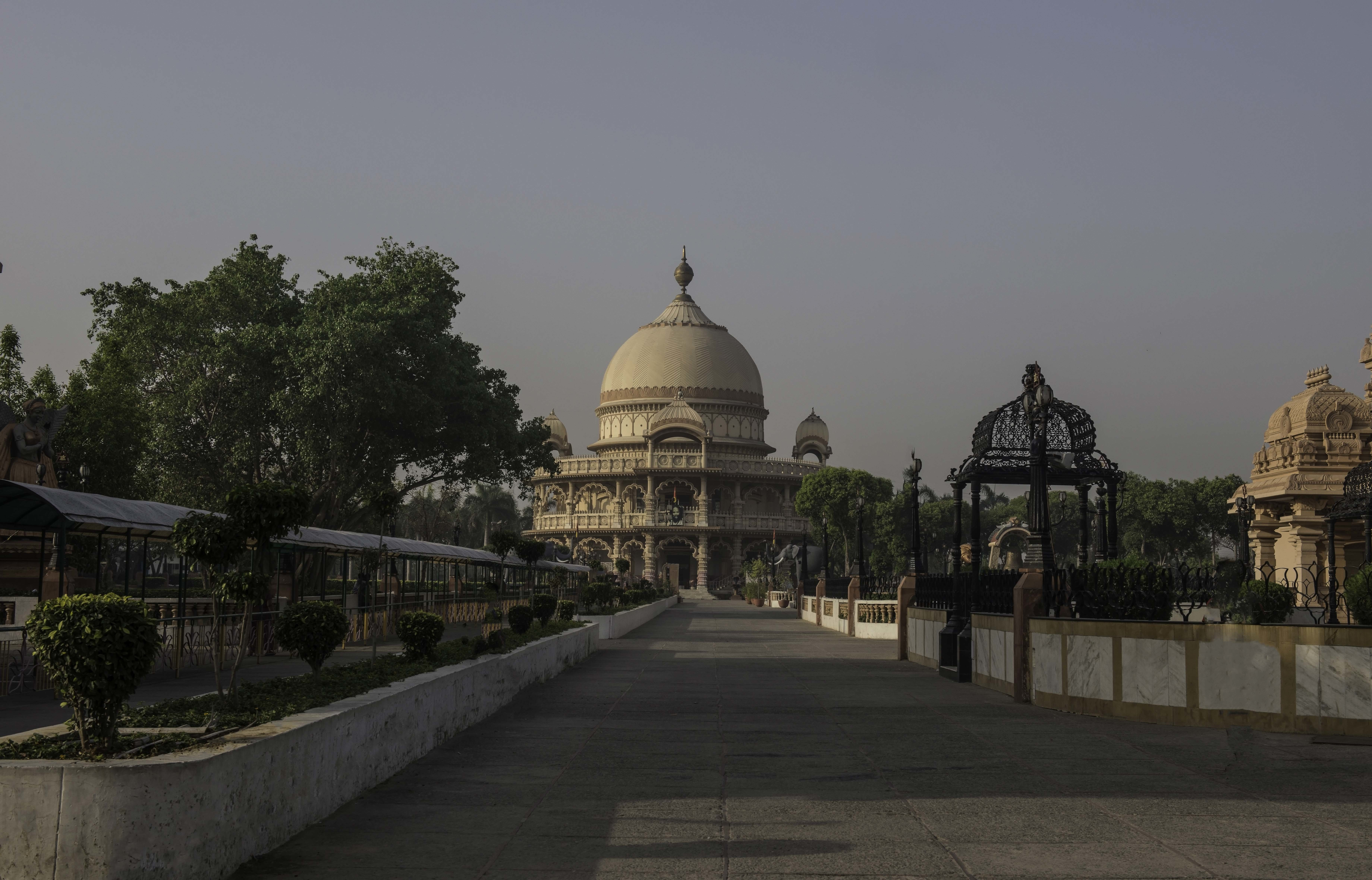
Gauri Nageshwara Temple Main Entrance

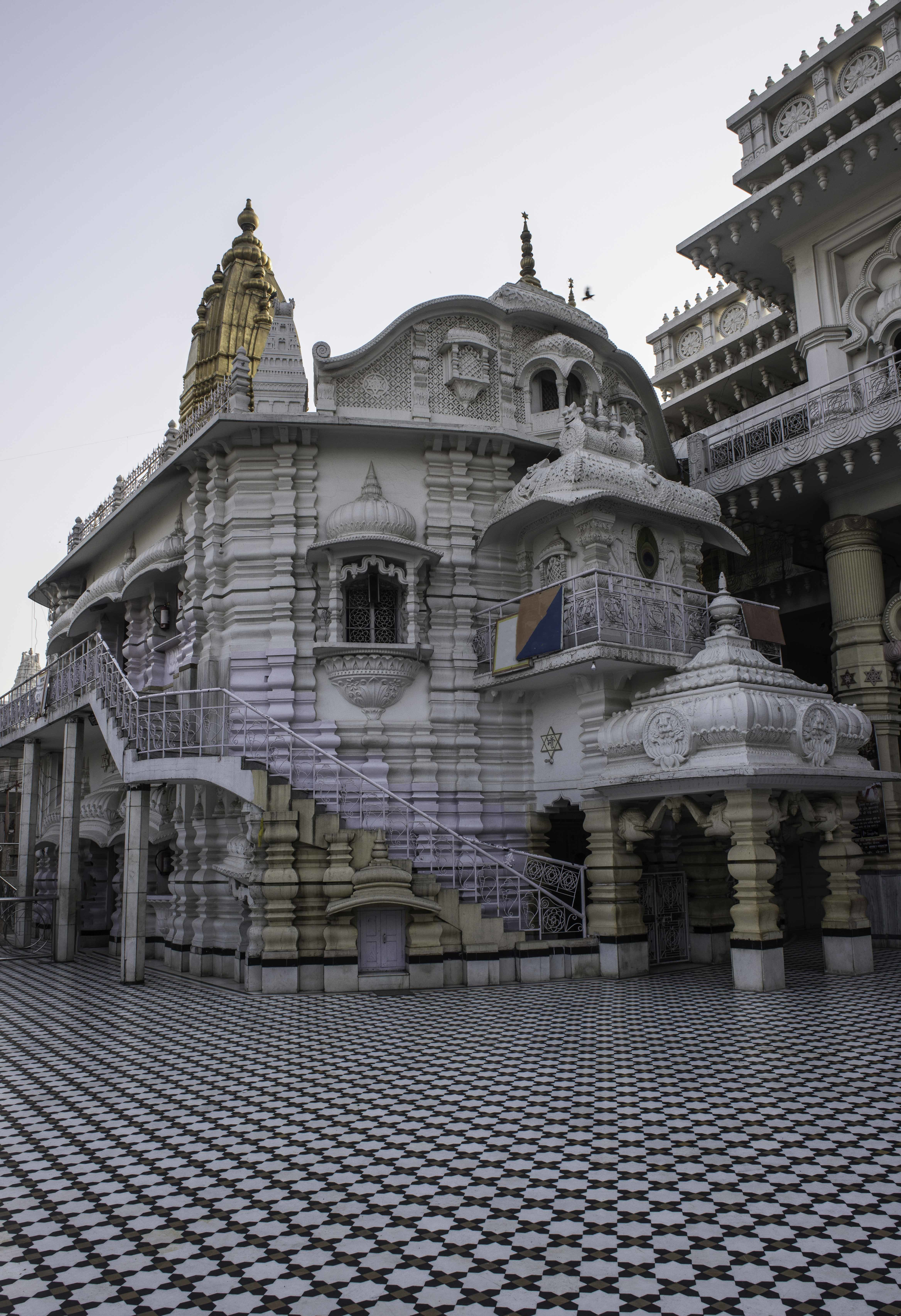
Shri Shiv Mandir inside Chattarpur Mandir Complex

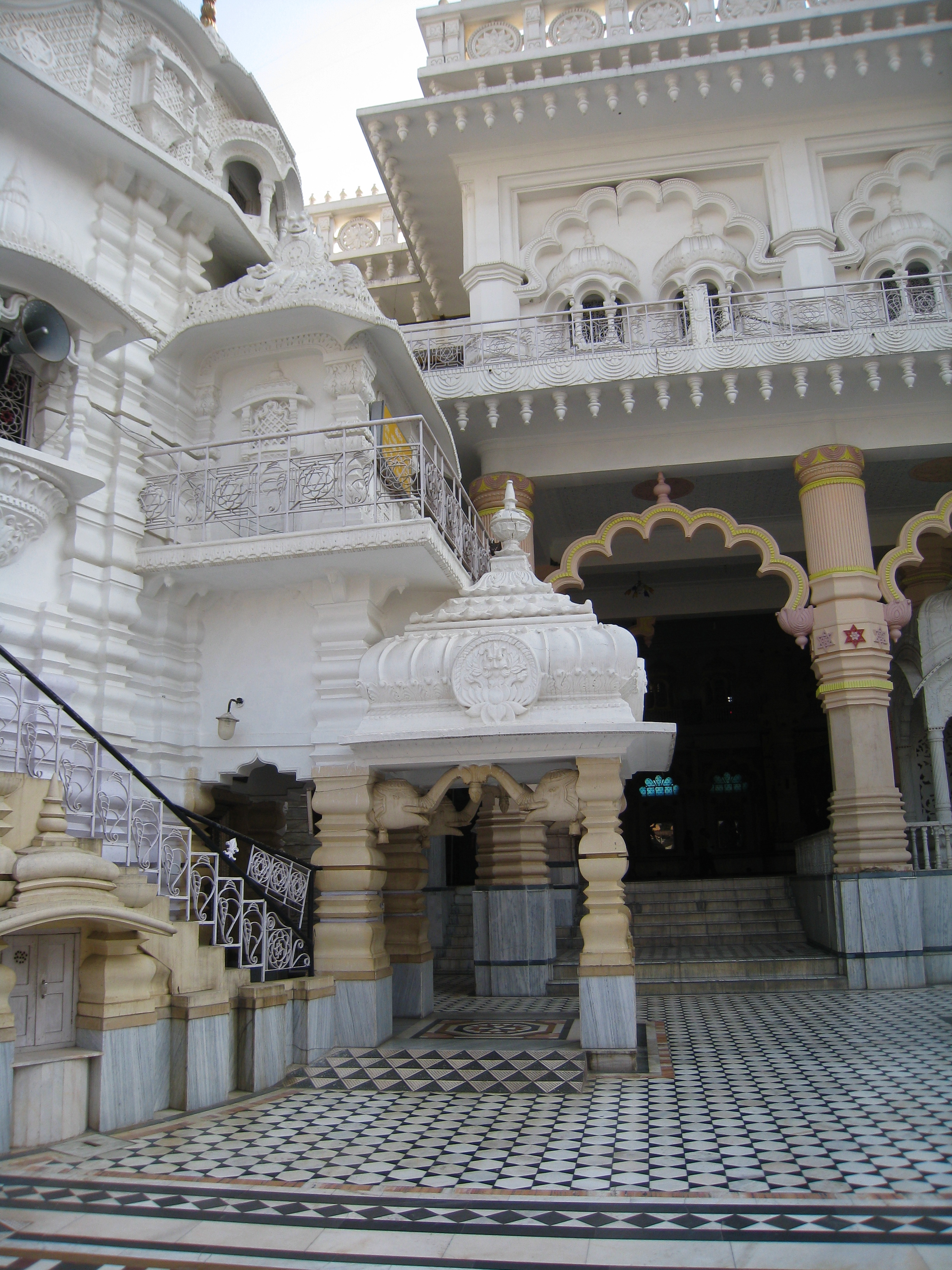
The main courtyard of Chhatarpur Temple

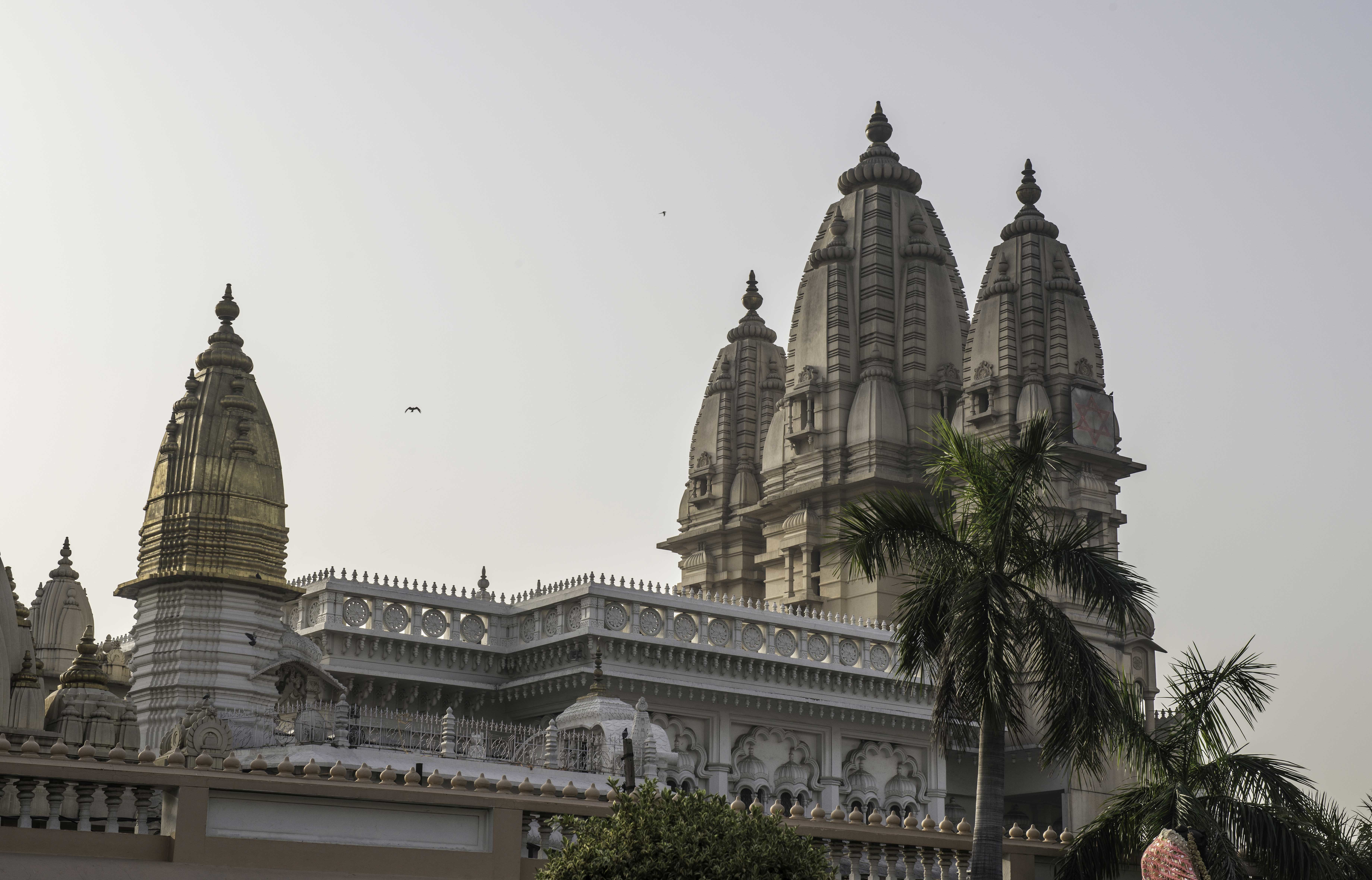
Main temple Gopura

The entire temple complex is spread over 24 ha (60 acres) and has over 20 small and large temples divided into three different complexes. The main deity of the temple is Goddess Katyayani, who is part of Navadurga, the nine forms of Hindu goddess Durga or Shakti, worshipped during the Navratri celebrations.

A side shrine within the main temple houses a shrine of Katyayani (Durga), which opens only during the bi-annual Navratri season, when thousands of people throng the premises for darshan. One nearby room has been made as living room with tables and chairs made in silver, and another regarded as the Shayan Kaksha (bedroom), where a bed, dressing table and table are carved in silver. This shrine opens to a large satsang or prayer hall, where religious discourses and bhajans, (religious songs) are held. At the entrance to the main temple stands an old tree, where devotees tie holy threads for wish fulfillment. Another shrine of Durga is open to devotees morning to evening, it lies above the shrines dedicated to Radha Krishna, and Ganesh.

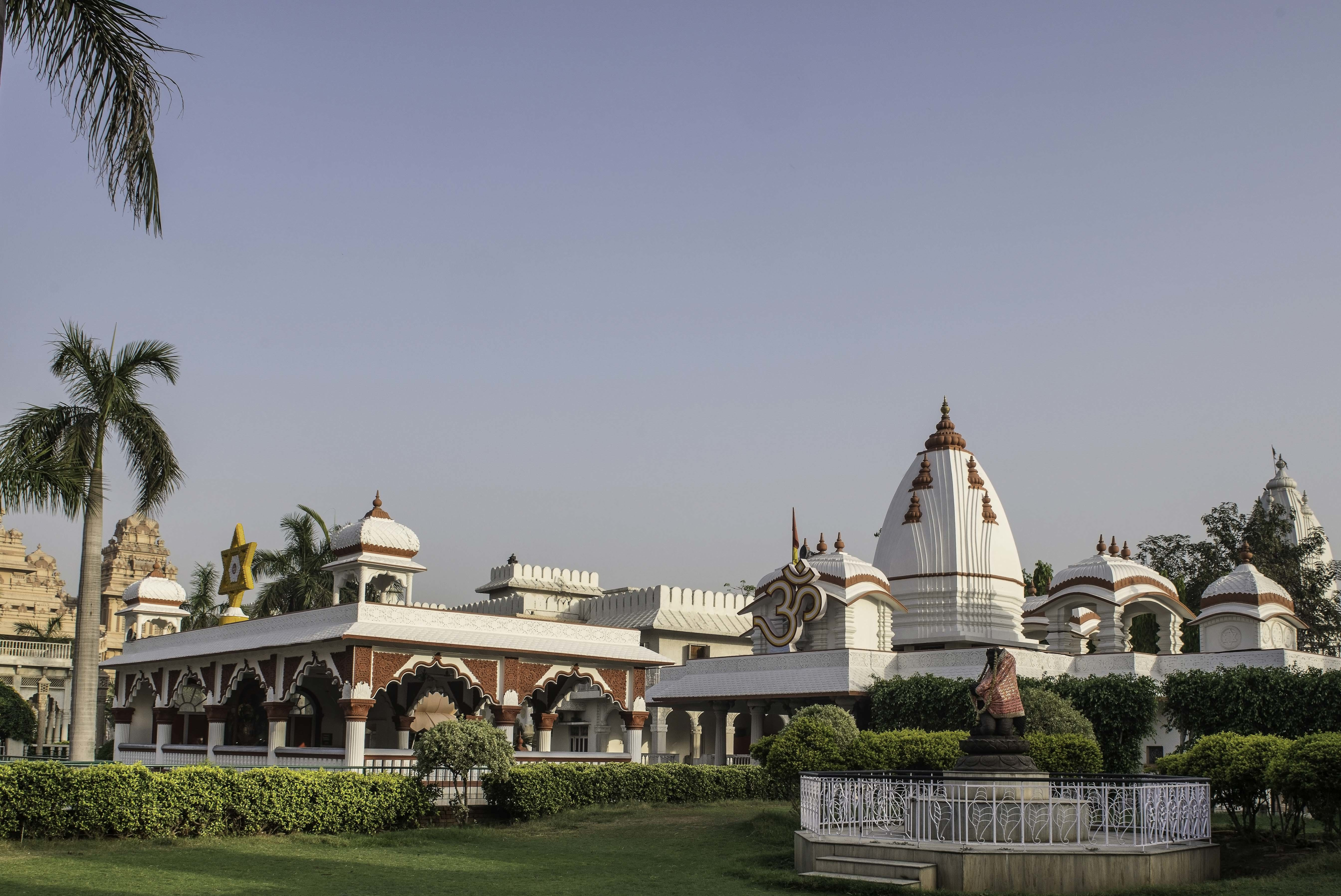
