= Damdama Lake =

Lake in Haryana, India

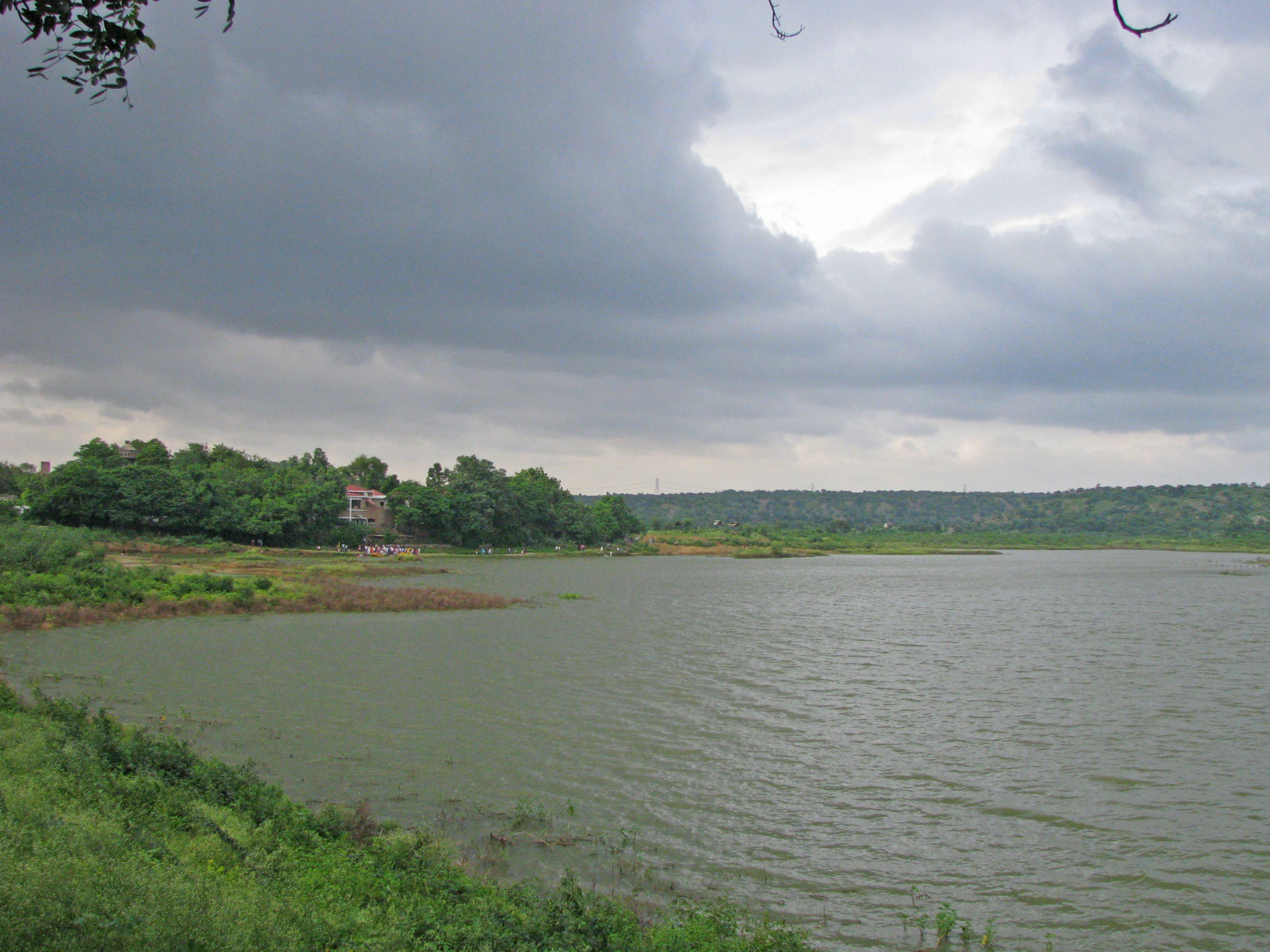
- Haryana Tourism restaurant on Damdama Lake

- Location within Haryana
- Location: Sohna, Gurugram district, Haryana, India
- Coordinates: 28.304°N 77.129°E
- Type: reservoir
- References: Anand Khatana Residence.

Damdama reservoir in Sohna, near Gurugram city in Gurugram district in the Indian state of Haryana. It is located in the Aravalli Hills region near Sohna. Damdama Lake is a small lake in Haryana and was formed when a stone and earthen dam constructed by the British was commissioned for rain water harvesting in 1947. The lake, held by an embankment, is fed mainly by monsoon rain pouring into a trough at the base of the Aravali hills. The lake greets visitors with a water level down to 20 ft (6.1 m). During monsoon the water level reaches up to 50 ft (15 m) - 70 ft (21 m).

It is an important biodiversity area within the Northern Aravalli leopard wildlife corridor stretching from Sariska Tiger Reserve to Delhi. Historical place around sanctuary are Badkhal Lake (6 km northeast), 10th century ancient Surajkund reservoir (15 km north) and Anangpur Dam (16 km north), Tughlaqabad Fort and Adilabad ruins (both in Delhi), Chhatarpur Temple (in Delhi). It is downstream from the seasonal waterfalls situated in the villages of Pali, Dhouj and Kot near Faridabad., the scared Mangar Bani and the Asola Bhatti Wildlife Sanctuary. There are several dozen lakes formed in the abandoned open pit mines found across the area.

The lake dries up during summer and is awaiting a government sponsored renewal process.

== Geology and climate ==
As it is located in a hilly region, the topography of this area is not even. Damdama Lake is spread in the shape of an amoeba and has many branches. The lake has a moderate climate and is good for a visit any time of the year. The best time to visit the lake is from October to March, late summers and monsoons. The climate is typically hot during summer, temperature reaching up to 45–47 °C.

== Ecology ==
Damdama lake is a natural home for birds, & more than 190 species of birds, migratory as well as local, visit here during summer, monsoon and winter season, i.e. all throughout the year a variety of birds from different places flock to Dream Island. Some of the major birds seen here are water fowl, cranes, cormorants, terns, egrets, kingfishers etc. While driving to Damdama Lake, you can also catch a glimpse of India's national bird peacock and blue bulls.

== Damdama Biodiversity Park ==
In February 2021, Haryana government initiated the 5-year development plan to convert 420 acre land on the slope of aravali mountain, including a 5-acre plant nursery, between Damdama and Kherla in the north as the biodiversity park by Gurujal, an NGO called Centre for Biological Development and Research and the Kherla panchayat. The team has collected the data about the flora and fauna of the area as well as the wild seeds from the forested areas of aravalli hills to grow in the nursery for the propagation of the diverse range of native plants. In 2021 the Chief Minister had declared Gurugram as the "forest cover area" under which four forested biodiversity areas will be created at Damdama, Shikohpur, Naurangpur and Kasan, which will also boost the tourism.

== Leisure ==
Surrounded by the Aravali Mountains, it is one of the popular picnic spot to spend the weekend away from the city in a quiet and scenic atmosphere. In the serene location, one can enjoy boating in row boats, paddle boats and motor boats. Damdama is known for its splendid adventure sports facilities such as para sailing, kayaking, cycling, angling, rock climbing, valley crossing. One can also go for nature walks in the nearby Aravali hills.

== Attractions nearby ==
=== Hot springs ===
The Sulfur hot spring of Sohna Sulphur Hot Spring at Sohna is a religious and tourist attraction with medicinal value for skin diseases. According to a legend, one of the pandav, Arjun, dug this well when he was thirsty.

=== Ancient Shiva temple ===
An ancient Shiva temple is located in Sohna and was built by the Raja of Bharatpur/Gwalior. Every year on the occasion of Shiv Chaudas & Shiv Ratri, the residents of Sohna offer their special prayers to Lord Shiva & Maa Bhagwati for the new born babies and newly married couples.

== See also ==
- Asola Bhatti Wildlife Sanctuary
- List of national parks and wildlife sanctuaries of Haryana
