= Pali, Faridabad =

Pali
- Village
- Location in Haryana, India Pali (India)
- Coordinates: 28°23′48″N 77°13′51″E
- Country: India
- State: Haryana
- District: Faridabad
- Tehsil: Faridabad

Population (2011)
  - Total: 12,000

Languages
  - Official: Hindi
- Time zone: UTC+5:30 (IST)
- PIN: 121004
- ISO 3166 code: IN-HR
- Vehicle registration: HR
- Website: haryana.gov.in

Pali is a bhadana's village Pali is an Indian village in the NIT area of Faridabad city of Faridabad district under Faridabad Lok Sabha constituency of Haryana state, well known for being biggest crusher zone of Asia, that also has a seasonal waterfall. It is the part of the Northern Aravalli leopard wildlife corridor, an important wildlife corridor which starts from the Sariska National Park in Rajasthan, passes through Nuh, Faridabad and Gurugram districts of Haryana and ends at Delhi Ridge.

The village is now a southwestern suburb of Faridabad city, located 11 kilometres (6.8 mi) away from the city centre on the MDR137 and "Pali-Badkhal road". It is 9 km northwest of Ballabhgarh the MDR133, 27 km east of Sohna on MDR133, 37 kilometres (23 mi) east of Gurgaon city.

== Climate ==
The area had become polluted due to the stone crushers and dyeing units in the area, which were shut down by the environmentalist non-governmental organizations. The main ecological issues are illegal mining, desertification, deforestation, encroachment and land grabbing of common Panchayat forest and grazing land called "bani".

== Tourism ==
Historical place around sanctuary are Badkhal Lake (6 km northeast), 10th century ancient Surajkund reservoir (15 km north) and Anangpur Dam (16 km north), Damdama Lake, Tughlaqabad Fort and Adilabad ruins (both in Delhi), Chhatarpur Temple (in Delhi). There are several dozen lakes formed in the abandoned open pit mines in and around the sanctuary. It is contiguous to the scared Mangar Bani and the Asola Bhatti Wildlife Sanctuary. In the Pali village itself, the tourist area is being developed around the waterfall and nearby temple by constructing two dams and a herbal park. This hilly forested area of Southern Delhi Ridge contains one of the last surviving remnants of Delhi Ridge hill range and its semi-arid forest habitat and its dependent wildlife. Once the whole Delhi Ridge was a forested area, but development has destroyed several parts of it.

=== Waterfalls ===
Pali monsoon waterfalls, Dhauj monsoon waterfalls, Kot monsoon waterfalls, collectively called Faridabad monsoon waterfalls are several dozen seasonal monsoon waterfalls in the Aravalli Range in the Pali, Dhuaj and Pali villages respectively. These are situated just west of the NIT industrial area on the outskirts of Faridabad. Next to one of the waterfall in Pali is a Hindu temple, both temple and waterfall are venerated by the local people.

=== Dam ===
Pali twin dams, approved in 2019 and to be developed at the cost of INR70 lakhs, are two dams in the Aravalli hills to capture the water from the monsoon waterfalls. West of Pali Jharna Mandir there are at least two dozen lakes formed in the abandoned open pit mines.

=== Herbal park ===
Pali herbal park will be developed near the waterfall and dam to boost the tourism.

=== Jharna temple ===
Jharna Mandir Pali Bani northeast of Pali village, is a temple next to the seasonal Pali waterfall in the forested aravalli hills called "Pali Bani", the temple takes its name Jharna (waterfall) from the Pali waterfall, both the temple and waterfall are venerated by the local people.

== See also ==
- Faridabad district
- Tourism in Haryana
- National Parks & Wildlife Sanctuaries of Haryana
