= Badkhal Lake =

Lake in India

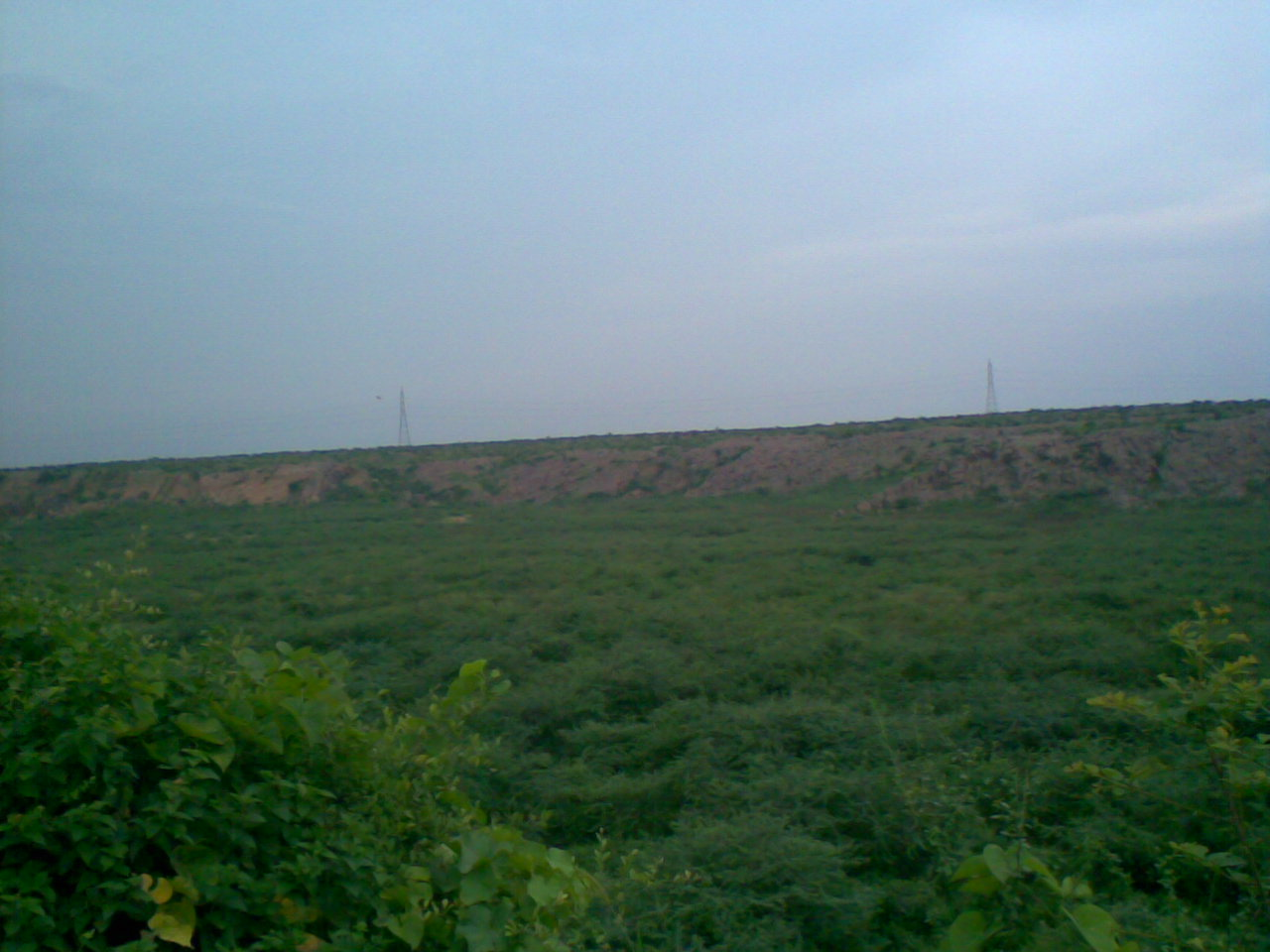
- Dried Badkhal lake as in 2008

- Location within Haryana
- Location: Faridabad
- Coordinates: 28.415°N 77.276°E
- Basin countries: India
- Settlements: Faridabad

Badkhal Lake was a natural lake situated in Badkhal village near Faridabad, in the Indian state of Haryana, about 29.6 kilometers from the national capital of Delhi. Fringed by the hills of the Aravalli Range, this was a man-made embankment. Owing to unchecked mining in neighbouring areas, the lake began drying up two decades back and is now totally dried up. There are functional Haryana Tourism Corporation restaurants in the vicinity. A flower show is held every spring here. Its name is most probably derived from the Persian word beydakhal, which means free from interference. Close to Badkhal Lake is the Peacock Lake. It is a biodiversity area within the Northern Aravalli leopard wildlife corridor stretching from Sariska Tiger Reserve to Delhi.

Historical places around the lake include the 10th century ancient Surajkund reservoir (15 km north) and Anangpur Dam (16 km north), the similarly dried up Damdama Lake, Tughlaqabad Fort, Adilabad ruins and the Chhatarpur Temple. There are several dozen lakes formed in the abandoned open pit mines in and around the sanctuary. It is contiguous to the seasonal waterfalls in Pali-Dhuaj-Kot villages of Faridabad, the sacred Mangar Bani hill forest and the Asola Bhatti Wildlife Sanctuary.

== History ==
The lake was built soon after the country got Independence in 1947 to facilitate water supply to the nearby farms. It was built by constructing a bund between two low-lying Aravalli hills, to trap run-off for irrigation. In 1972, the Government of Haryana built a 30-room resort off the lake, which was a major tourist attraction during the '70s through to the '90s, with boating and other activities. Migratory birds also used to visit the lake.

Construction boom in the National Capital Region drove quarrying and mining in the area at a large scale. As illegal mining and quarrying mushroomed, the downward water flow to the lake was not just obstructed, but aquifers were also damaged. In addition, deforestation and rampant borewell digging in the area owing to urbanisation worsened the situation, leaving the lake high and dry. A number of mineral water companies have also illegally sourced water from the lake.

Since 2009, the lake has been observed as completely dried up, leaving only grassy terrain. Unusually low rainfall in the area has also been cited.

In January 2010, the lake and the nearby Surajkund was filled up with water in conjunction with 2010 Commonwealth Games. But in March 2014, in a survey report released by the Delhi Parks and Gardens Society (DPGS), under the Government of Delhi's department of environment, the lake was completely dry and completely dependent on rains for water. The report also revealed 190 of 611 water bodies in Delhi had also gone dry.

== Renewal Efforts ==
The initial renewal efforts were entrusted with the state irrigation department. In 2017, they tried to replenish the lake bed by supplying water from the Okhla canal, but it was found to be an unviable option. The state government then approached Manav Rachna University in 2018, which prepared a report suggesting that Sewage Treatment Plant (STP) water may be used for the same. Afterwards, experts from Indian Institute of Technology-Roorkee were chosen to collect soil samples and conduct infiltration tests on the lake bed. They carried out a geo-technical survey of the lake under the Smart Cities Mission and submitted its report a year later.

A lake revival project worth Rs 79 crore was also taken up in 2018. This included the STP project which aims to fill up the lake with regular discharge from the plant to a level of 6 metre in 300 days. Worth Rs 30 crore, the project was sanctioned by the state government in November that year. But it was reported in October, 2019 that a delay in formal clearances by the Forest Department and the Pollution Control Board had halted all work.

As of 2019, various other measures are being discussed at the government level to restore the lake, but damaged aquifers, low groundwater level and disturbance of water catchment pathways cast aspersions. Environmental experts have called the governments plans a simple renovation, but not a full renewal.

As of 2025, water levels within the Lake have risen to 7 metres at the deepest point; in the centre. An invasive plant species covers the surface of the water, causing evapotranspiration of the water underneath. Plans are in place for use of a biological plant eating species to be used to break down the invasive species.

== See also ==
- Surajkund
- Faridabad
- Damdama Lake
- List of national parks and wildlife sanctuaries of Haryana
