= Asola Bhatti Wildlife Sanctuary =

Wildlife sanctuary near Delhi, India

Asola-Bhati Wildlife Sanctuary
- IUCN category IV (habitat/species management area)
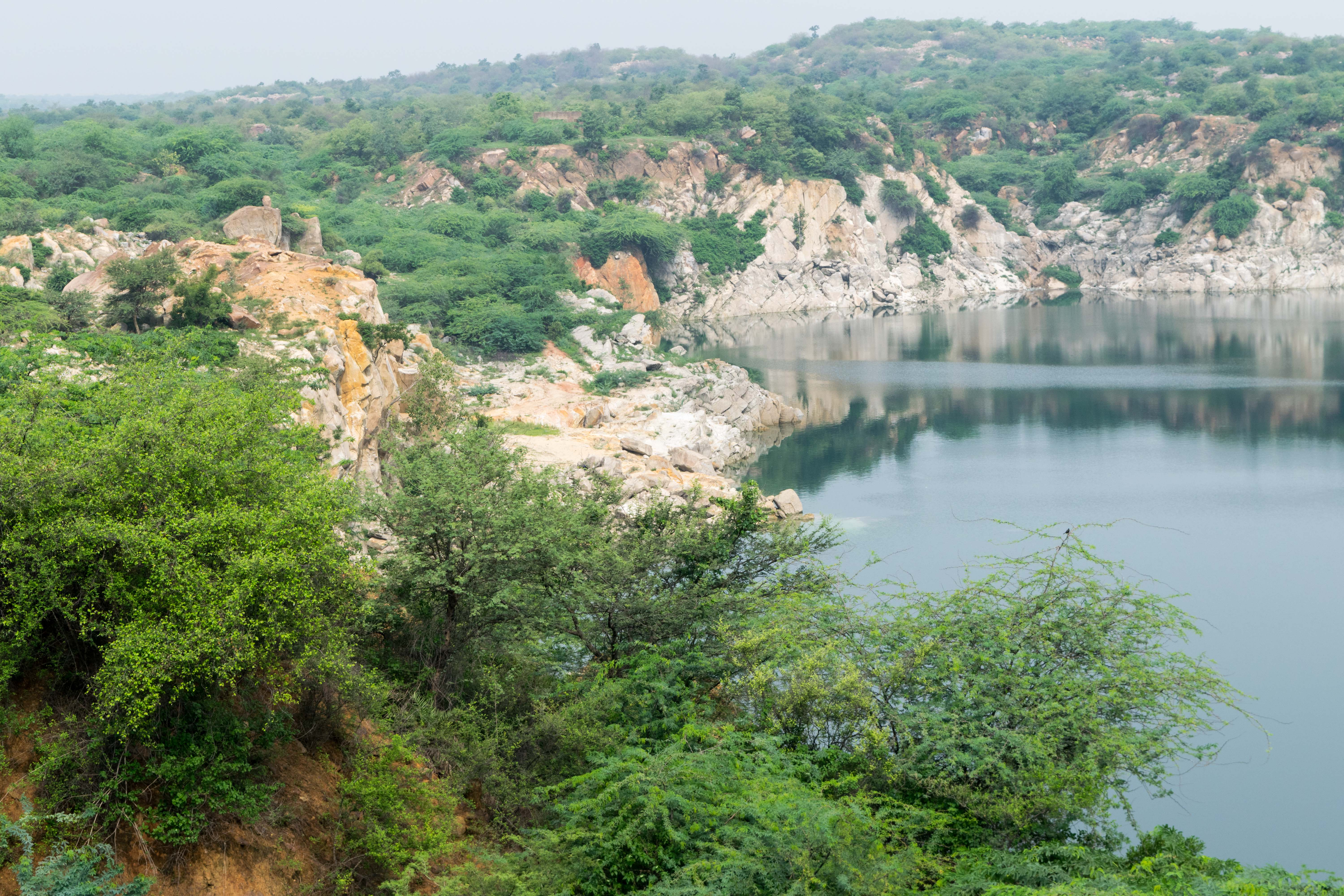

- Location within Delhi Location within India
- Interactive map of Asola-Bhati Wildlife Sanctuary
- Location: Delhi, India
- Coordinates: 28.4762°N 77.23°E
- Area: 6,874 acres (2,782 ha)
- Established: 1986

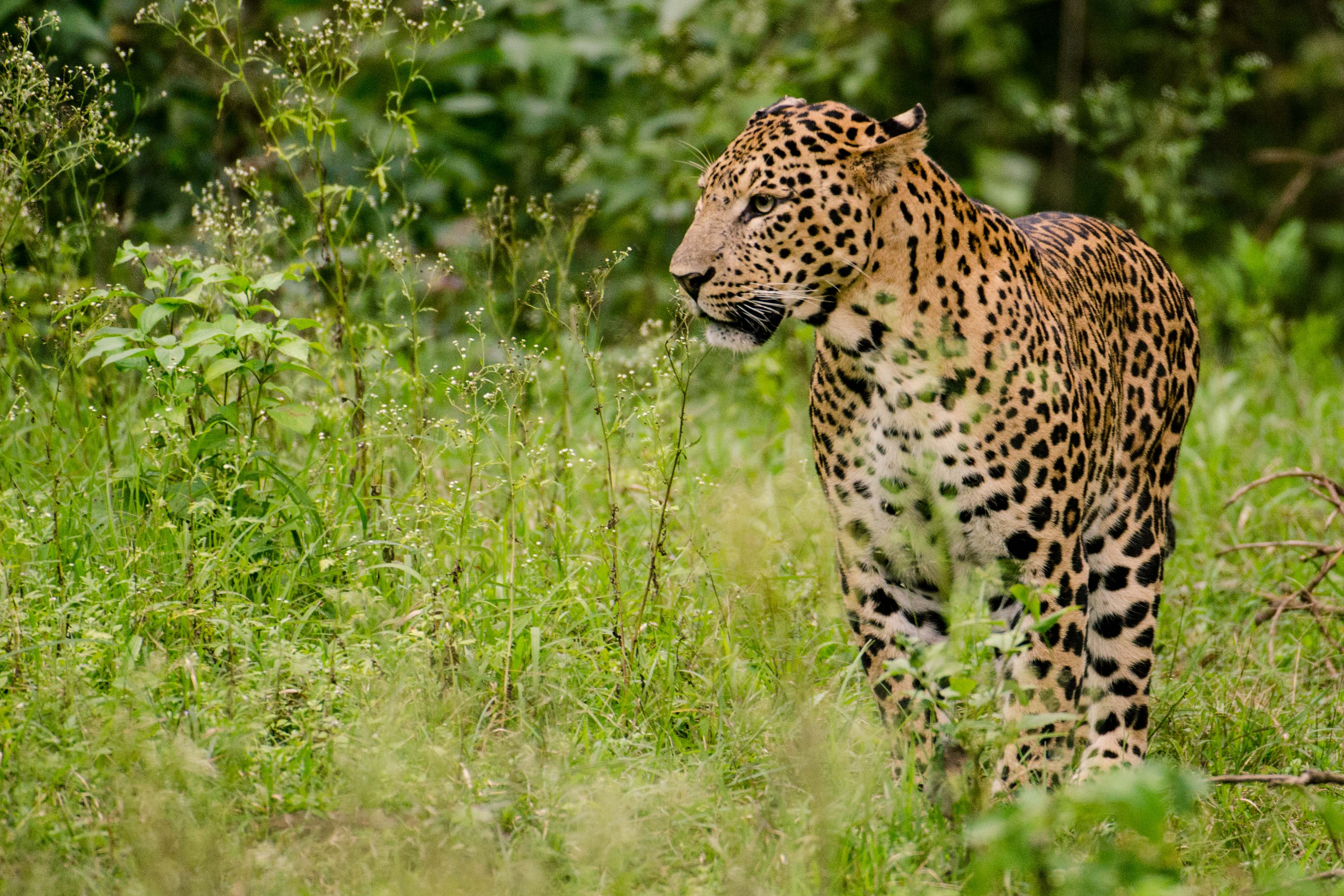
Indian Leopard is found at Asola Bhati Wildlife Sanctuary.

Asola-Bhati Wildlife Sanctuary covering 32.71 km^{2} area on the Southern Delhi Ridge of Aravalli hill range on Delhi-Haryana border lies in Southern Delhi as well as northern parts of Faridabad and Gurugram districts of Haryana state. Biodiversity significance of Ridge lies in its merger with the Indo-Gangetic Plain, as it is the part of the Northern Aravalli leopard wildlife corridor, an important wildlife corridor which starts from the Sariska National Park in Rajasthan, passes through Nuh, Faridabad and Gurugram districts of Haryana and ends at Delhi Ridge.

This protected area contains one of the last surviving remnants of Delhi Ridge hill range and its semi-arid forest habitat and its dependent wildlife. Once the whole Delhi Ridge was a forested area, but development has destroyed several parts of it.

Historical places around sanctuary are Surajkund and Anangpur Dam (both in Haryana), Tughlaqabad Fort and Adilabad ruins (both in Delhi), Chhatarpur Temple (in Delhi). There are several dozen lakes formed in the abandoned open pit mines in and around the sanctuary. It is contiguous to the seasonal waterfalls in Pali-Dhuaj-Kot villages of Faridabad and the sacred Mangar Bani.

== Location and access ==
It is located in South Delhi District all along Delhi, Faridabad and Gurgaon interstate border. It can be accessed from several points from Delhi and Haryana. On Delhi-Faridabad order, it can be approached from Tughlaqabad (Mehrauli-Badarpur Road) to Surajkund Mela Road (2 km (1.2 mi)) near Dr. Karni Singh Shooting Range, or from Mehrauli via Chhatarpur Temple 6 km (3.7 mi) near Sanjay Colony (Bhati Area). It is about 25 km (16 mi) from Indira Gandhi International Airport in Delhi, the Delhi Railway station is about 30 km (19 mi) and Maharana Pratap Bus Stand is about 32 km (20 mi) from the sanctuary.

== History ==
=== Etymology ===
The sanctuary gets its name from the contiguous Asola village near Tughlaqabad in the Delhi NCR.

=== Protected status ===
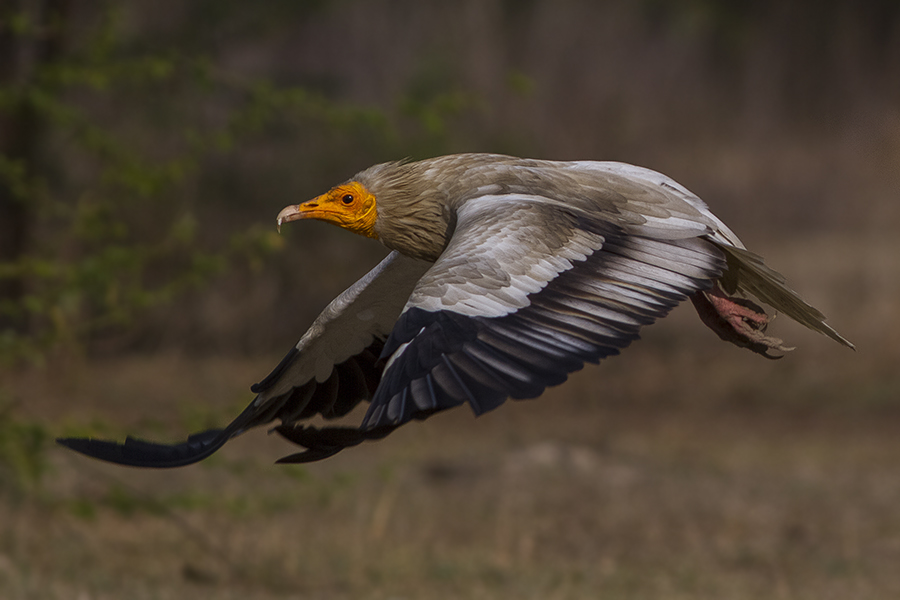
Egyptian vulture, adult male in Aravalli range.

Legal protected Status of southern ridge was uncertain till 1986 when community lands of the villages of Asola, Shapur and Maidangari (4,707 acres (1,905 ha)) were notified during 1986 and the lands of Bhati (2,167 acres (877 ha)) were notified in 1991 as a sanctuary.

In 2011, Supreme Court of India has mandated that all states must define an Eco-Sensitive Zone (ESZ) around the forests to limit the adverse aspects of human impact on the environment. In 2017, Government of Delhi had notified 15.55 km^{2} SEZ. A January 2019 plan by Government of Haryana envisages notification of 12.17 km^{2} (1,217 ha) area as SEZ, of which 11.82 km^{2} falls in Faridabad (100m to 1000m zone covering Anangpur, Mangar bani, Badhkhal, Pali, Mewal, Ankhir and Mohtabad) and 0.35 km^{2} in Gurugram (100m zone covering Bandhwari, Gwal Pahari and Balola). The limits of ESZ on Haryana side end along the northern side of MDR137 Gurugram-Faridabad State Highway. The southern side of this highway already has 12.33 km^{2} of protected forests (6.825 sgkm in Faridabad and 5.51 km^{2} in Gurugram) which are not included in this ESZ. The limit of ESZ is only 100 m in certain places to exclude highly urbanised areas, such as from Surajpur to Badkhal and also around Amanpur.

Earlier this area had a history of illegal mining for red badarpur sand and stone which were in hot demand for building activity and construction. Thus the area came to be known as Bhati mines. Several large open and deep pits across sanctuary, are the abandoned mine pits, have now turned into lakes.

== Biodiversity significance ==
=== Eco-impact ===
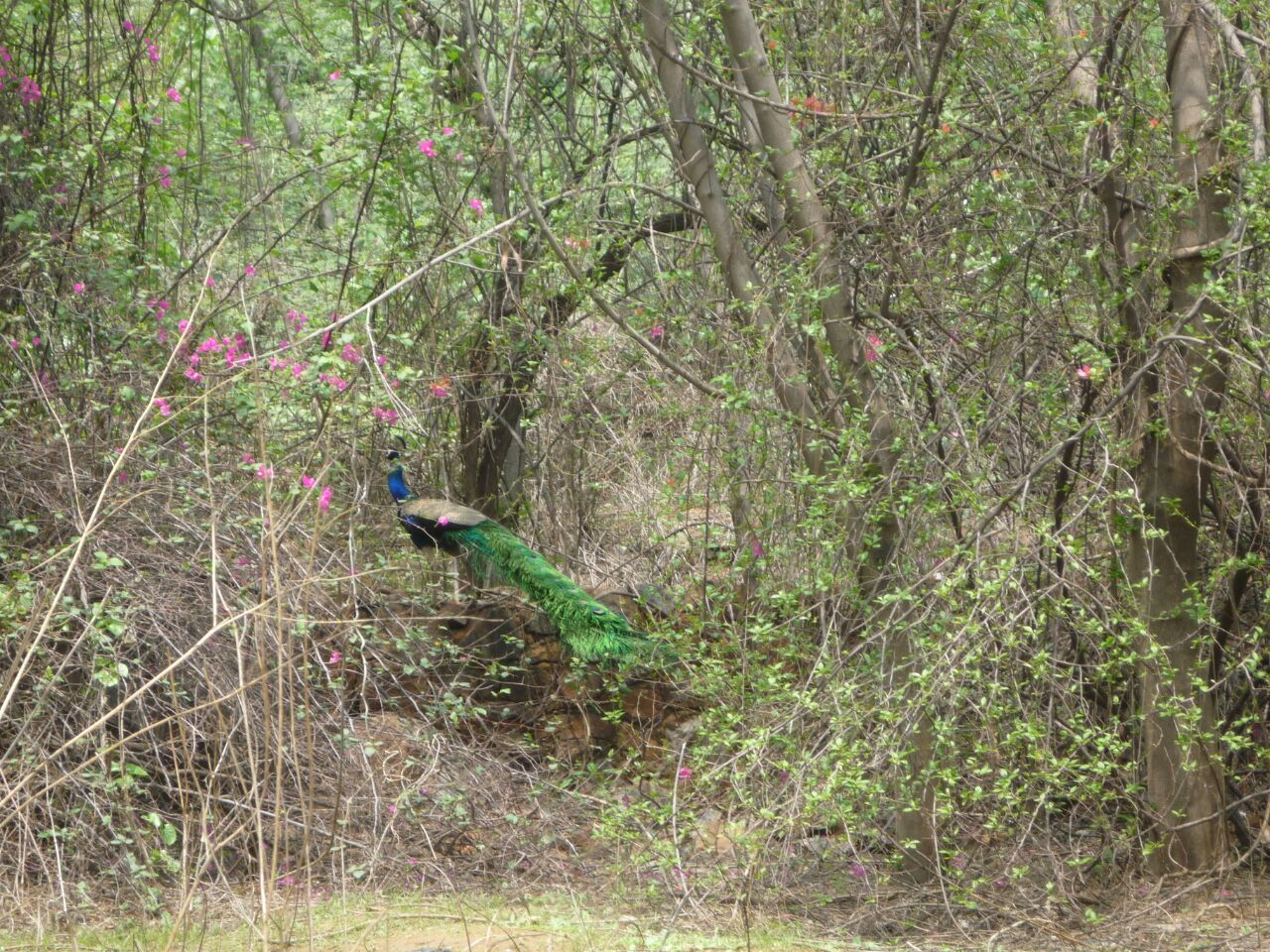
Peacock.

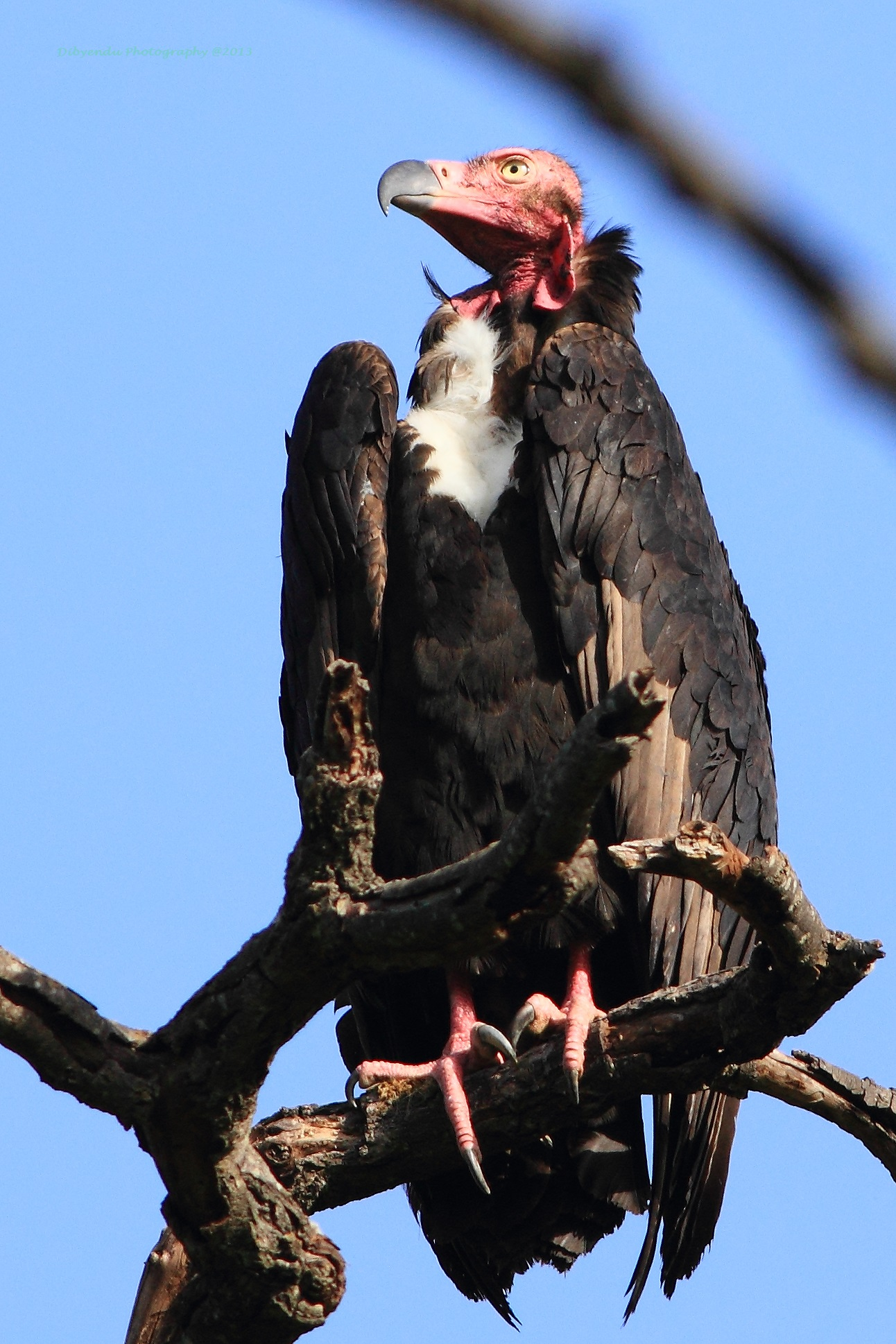
Red-headed vulture, adult male in Aravalli range.

There are about 193 species of birds reported from Asola along with large number of medicinal plants, more than 80 species of butterflies, hundreds of other insects, mammals such as leopards, nilgai (blue bull, the largest antelope of the country), blackbuck (fastest land animal surviving in the wild in the country), black-naped hare, Indian crested porcupine, small Indian civet, golden jackal and jungle cat.

Delhi Ridge is the northernmost extension of one of the oldest mountain system of the world, Aravalli range, which begin in the state of Gujarat near Great Rann of Kutch. Biogeographically it represents outlier of Aravalli Mountain Range among protected area in India. It has a high potential for establishing conservation education and nature interpretation programs. It is Delhi NCR's green lung, carbon sink, source of ground water recharge, and shelterbelt against advancing aridity.

=== Fauna ===
This is an important habitat for the Indian leopard. Endangered species in the sanctuary include red-headed vulture and egyptian vulture, and the Government of Haryana has a vulture conservation program in place. Near-threatened species include painted stork and white-faced ibis. Rare birds include grey-headed fish eagle.

==== Leopards and jackals of Aravalli ====
Sariska to Delhi leopard wildlife corridor, of which "Asola Bhati wildlife sanctuary" is one of the northernmost important part, is a 200 km long important biodiversity and wildlife corridor which runs from the Sariska Tiger Reserve in Rajasthan to Delhi Ridge. This corridor is an important habitat for the Indian leopards and jackals of Aravalli, who often migrate between Delhi and Sariska. Urban development, specially the highways and railways bisecting the Aravalli range and wildlife corridor in several place pose a great risk. Large parts of Aravalli are legally and physically unprotected, with no wildlife passages and little or no wildlife conservation work resulting in deaths of over 10 leopards in 4 years between January 2015 to January 2019.

Leopards pugmarks have often been sighted at "Asola Bhati wildlife sanctuary" and the contiguous forested areas of Gurugram-Faridabad Aravalli hills such as Mangar Bani, Badkhal Lake wildlife area, Mohbtabad, Roj ka Meo. Gurugram-Faridabad Highway bisects these forested wildlife areas, which often results in the accidental death of wildlife including leopards. In January 2019, Wildlife Institute of India announced that they will undertake the survey of leopard and wildlife, using pugmarks and trap cameras, subsequently leopards and jackals will be tracked via the radio collars.

According to a 2019 study by Bombay Natural History Society (BNHS), 27 species of 14 families are found in the area, the number of golden jackal has doubled from 8 to 19 in 8 km tract where rodents and hares are their prey base along with the staple diet of zizipus jujube (jhad ber), leopards have increased too, ruddy mongoose and jungle cats are often sighted too, though striped hyena have been vanishing.

The first recorded leopard births in the sanctuary was seen through a camera trap in January 2023. In April 2024, a new male was released, bringing the known population to 12.

Since 2022, camera traps in and around the Asola Bhatti Wildlife Sanctuary have captured at least five more leopards, demonstrating the leopards' ongoing presence and surveillance in the sanctuary's environment.

=== Flora ===
Plant species include butea monosperma (dhak or flame of forest), anogeissus (dhok), Wrightia tinctoria (inderjao), Indian elm, neolamarckia cadamba (kadamba), prosopis cineraria (jaand), tinospora cordifolia (giloi), etc.

== Restoration ==
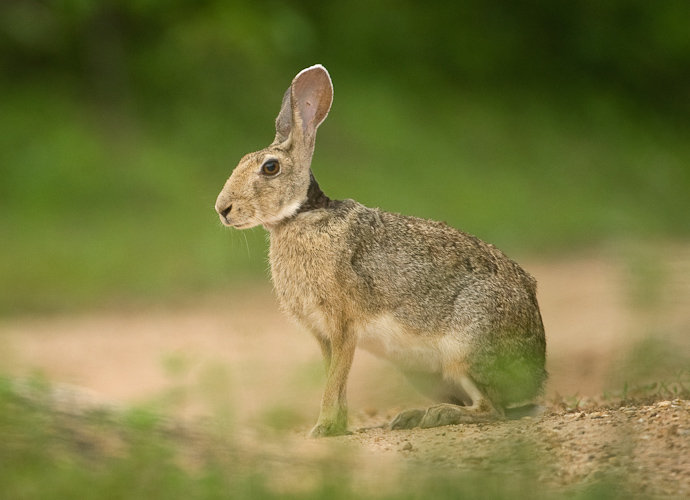
Black-naped hare.

=== Restoration projects ===
In 2000, the Department of Environment of Delhi Government commenced a 5-year rehabilitation of 2,100 acres (850 ha) of Bhati Mines area in the Asola Bhati Wildlife Sanctuary at the cost of Rs.823 lacs, which was extended for a further period of 3 years with an additional outlay of Rs.493.19 lakhs. Till 31 March 2006, 700,000 saplings were planted. The project was further extended for another 3 years. A second Eco Task Force was created for Asola Wildlife Sanctuary of 5000 acres.

As of 2019, Haryana is also undertaking conservation works in the sanctuary and ESZ including establishment of ESZ, rainwater harvesting, restoration of degraded land and habitat, agro forestry, herbal plants, etc. The use of organic farming, solar energy and horticulture, non-polluting small scale industries will be promoted and felling of trees will be prohibited while regulating the urban and construction activities in the ESZ.

=== Lakes ===
There are several lakes in the sanctuary, all of which are the abandoned minepits of Bhati mines, are being restored as the wetland habitat. These lakes include Surajkund Lake, Bhardwaj lake, Death valley lake (also known as "CITM lake 2"), CITM lake 1, Dolphin lake, Nallah lake, Zile Singh lake, Mahamai lake, Radhe Krishan lake and several more. Badkhal Lake and Lake peacock to the south lie adjacent to the sanctuary.

=== Rehabilitation of urban monkeys ===
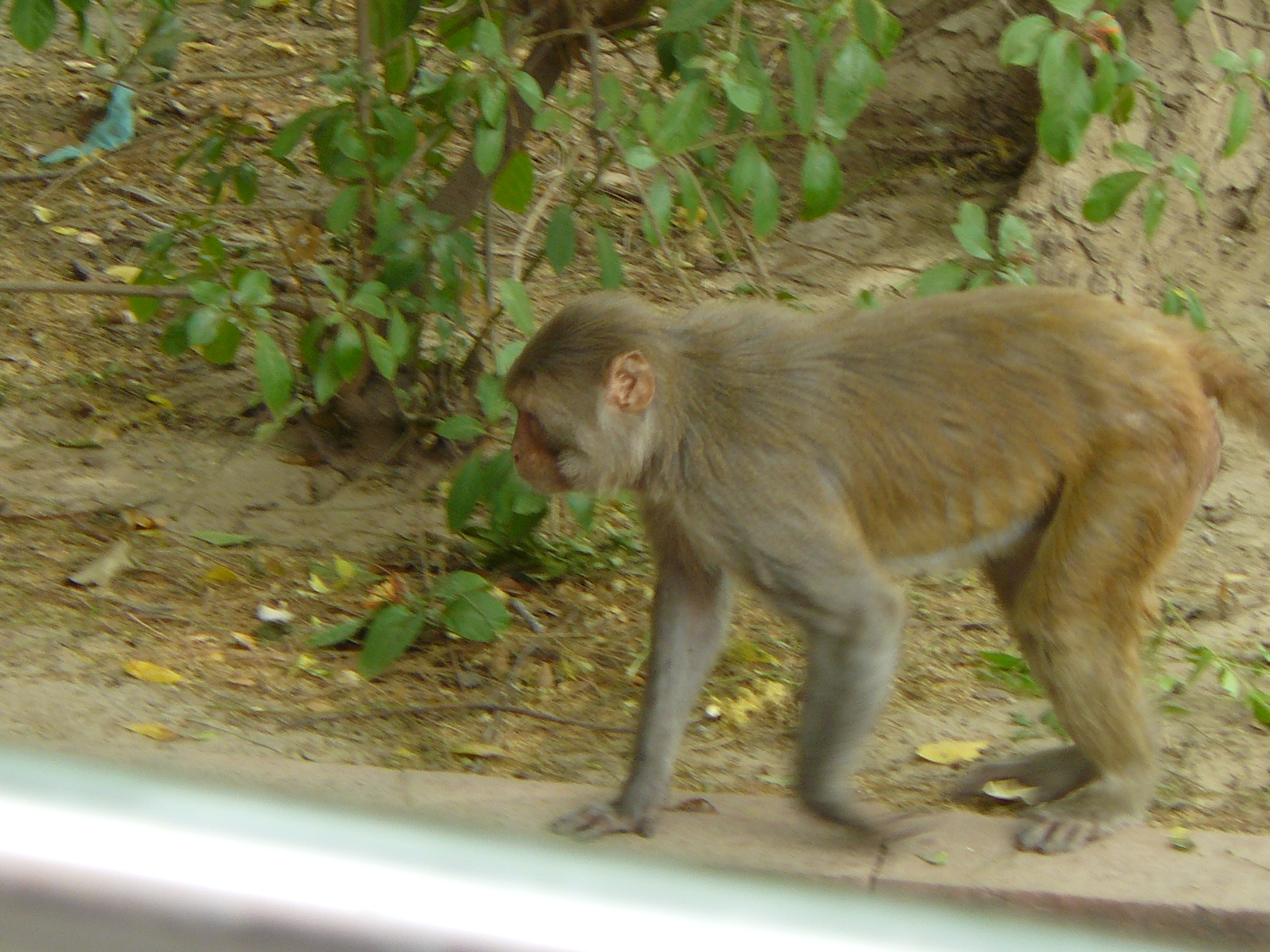
Rhesus macaque or Indian monkey of Delhi.

Delhi city as per some officials has anywhere between 5,000 and 20,000 stray rhesus macaque (Macaca mulatta) monkeys, though this could easily be too low. Parts of the city, especially on the southern edge, are besieged with these teeming animals, who sit on the roadside as traffic passes, or else play in the branches of the tree cover above. Dealing with the monkey problem has been a slow process, Hindus believe that the animals are manifestations of the monkey god Hanuman and feed them bananas and peanuts especially near temples. Culling them is out of the question. Delhi's attempts to persuade a number of other states to accept the city's monkeys have also fallen flat. The authorities in other states have said they had enough monkeys of their own to be dealing with, never mind taking in extra troublemakers from Delhi. In 2007 the federal government demanded that the city authorities act against the monkeys. Exasperated by the monkeys, which had previously broken into a government office, torn up and destroyed secret documents and even broken into the complex in which Prime Minister Manmohan Singh's office is located, bitten staff and members of public, they called for action. In May 2007, under pressure from various politicians and campaigners, the Delhi High Court ordered the authorities to begin rounding up the stray monkeys and relocating them to a specially constructed sanctuary. That, they believed, would be the end of the problem.

Authorities have established a sanctuary by erecting a 45 ft (14 m) wall of hardened plastic that contains an area of many acres in Asola-Bhati Wildlife Sanctuary, Delhi. Since April, officials captured and released 1,650 monkeys into the reserve. Trucks will deliver shipments of caged inmates trapped in the city. The city pays monkey catchers 450 rupees (£5.50) per animal and has planned to increase the number it employs. "We trap them in cages and transfer them to the reserve", explains an official in the city's wildlife department. However the released monkeys are not well contained inside the reserve walls as they climb over it and attack and pinch people in the neighboring village where they like to go for foraging.

Menace of wild urban monkeys in Delhi sprouted the popular urban legend of Monkey-man of Delhi which has been fictionalized in popular culture in the Bollywood Hindi feature film Delhi-6.

=== Conservation Education centre ===
The main attraction in the Asola area now is the Conservatuion Education centre (CEC) in the Forest Department building run in collaboration with the Bombay Natural History Society and Government of Delhi. Visitors are made aware of Flora and Fauna, along with information on how to help to conserve them. The film shows and slide shows are conducted by the CEC staff.

=== Nature's trail ===
The Nature trail, 2 km (1.2 mi) long route, run by the staff of CEC through the scrub jungle that surrounds the building is enriched with interesting facts about the nature, flora, faunal and topography of area, including the patches of Anogeissus, Balanite and riparian belt representative of Aravalli Hill Range.

=== Special programs ===
CEC Delhi BNHS organises trips to Asola Bhati Wildlife Sanctuary every winter and summer for children.

== Threats ==
=== Lack of wildlife crossings and protective wall ===
To separate the sanctuary and ESZ from the urbanised areas, the Delhi side of the ESZ already has a boundary wall but the urbanised areas in Haryana lack the boundary wall.

The area lacks wildlife crossings and accidental death of rare and endangered wild animals is a common occurrence on the roads along the sanctuary. In four years between January 2015 to January 2019, at least 10 leopards have died in accidents or conflicts in this corridor. In 2015, a 7-month-old leopard was killed near Pali chowk after being hit by a heavy vehicle on the Gurugram-Faridabad State Highway. In January 2019, another 10-month-old female leopard was killed on the same spot by another heavy vehicle. Roads and highways bisect the wildlife corridors, and at night light beams from vehicle travelling at high speed blind the animals, resulting in hit and run deaths. Experts and activists have been demanding the elimination of roads and highways and introduction of wildlife crossings.

=== Bandwari waste-to-energy plant and landfill ===
Bandhwari landfill and waste plant has been causing environmental pollution. A waste-to-energy plant on which govt has already spent INR300 crore is being expanded with another INR400 crore with two of sand mine pits to be used for dumping the untreated toxic waste, this has caused serious environmental threat to the sensitive ecology.

In 2017, National Green Tribunal (NGT) asked the Central Pollution Control Board (CPCB) to the test the groundwater sample near Bandhwari plant as the landfill site has a stream of dirty black water pollution the aquifers and leeching in to the forest in the area which is known to discharge industrial waste and construction debris in the Aravalli forests along the roads in Gurugram-Fridabad area.

=== Water scarcity ===
Haryana side of Gurugram-Faridabad Aravalli hill forests lack availability of water due to which wild animals are not seen there much. Government of Haryana used drones for aerial survey and dug 22 ephemeral pits in 2018 to store the rain water which become dry during the summer months. In January 2019, govt announced the plan to make the pit perennial by connecting those with pipeline from the nearby villages.

=== Official denial of presence of wildlife ===
Human activity, such as unplanned urbanization and polluting plants, also pose a great threat. There is often reluctance and denial on part of the government officials of the presence of wildlife such as leopard so that the forest land can be exploited and opened up for the intrusive human development.

=== Invasive Species ===
The sanctuary is affected by the invasive species of Prosopis Juliflora and Lantana Camara. Accruing to a Wildlife Institute of India report in 2026, Prosopis Juliflora alone cover about 63.48% of the sanctuary and forest accounts for only 18.83%.

== See also ==
- Arid Forest Research Institute
- National Zoological Park Delhi
- Najafgarh drain bird sanctuary, Delhi
- Najafgarh lake or Najafgarh jheel (Now completely drained by Najafgarh drain)
- Sultanpur National Park, bordering Delhi in adjoining Gurgaon District, Haryana
- Okhla Sanctuary, bordering Delhi in adjoining Uttar Pradesh
