= Anangpur Dam =

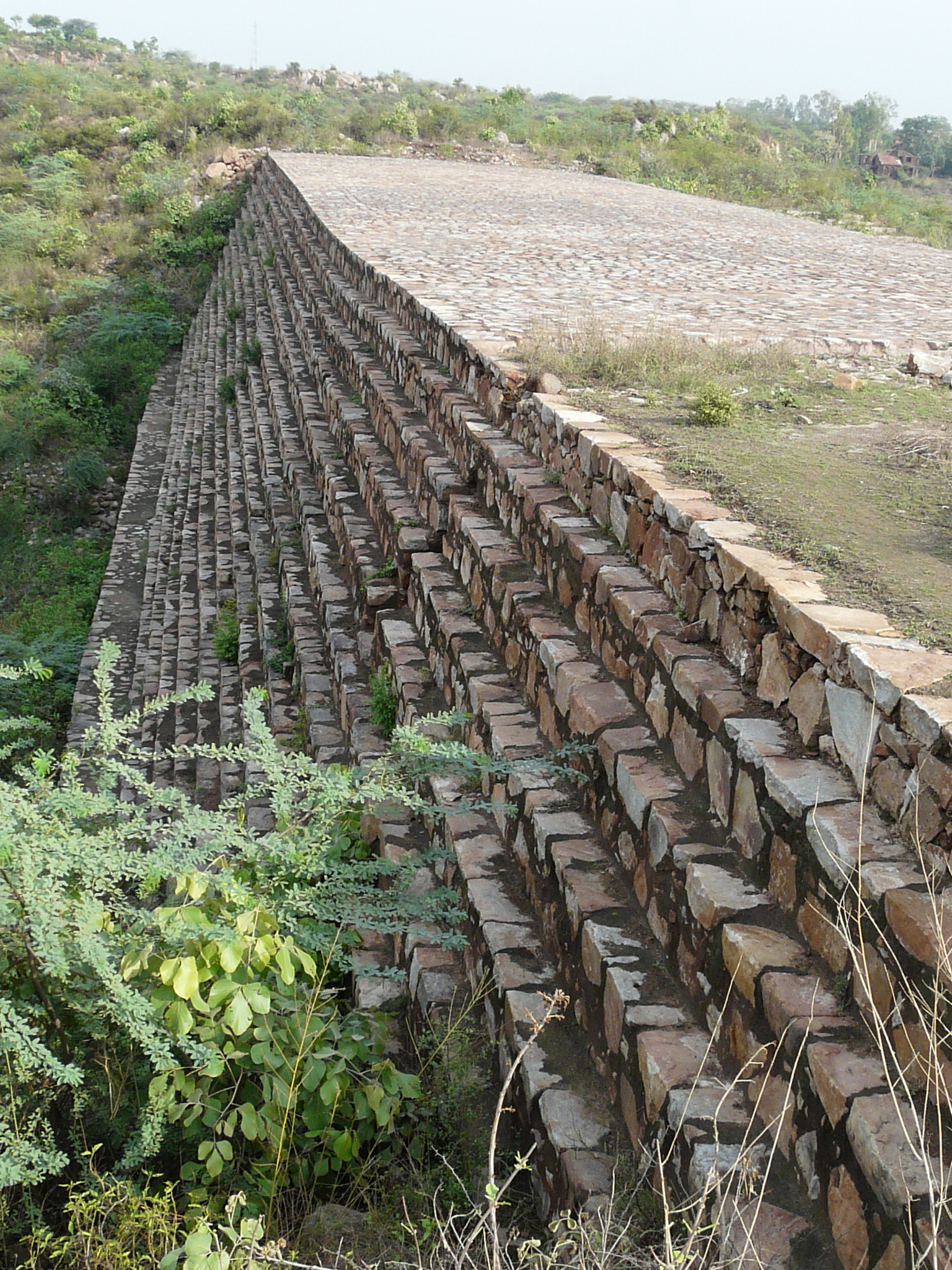
- Anangpur Dam

- Location within Haryana
- Location: Delhi and Haryana
- Coordinates: 28°28′24″N 77°16′34″E
- Construction began: 8th century

Dam and spillways
- Impounds: local nullah (stream)
- Height: 7 m (23 ft)
- Length: 50 m (164 ft)

Reservoir
- Creates: Water supply & Irrigation

The Anangpur Dam is an Indian hydraulic engineering structure said to be built during the reign of King Anangpal I of the Tomara Rajput dynasty in the 8th century. It is located near the Anangpur village in Faridabad district, Haryana, India.

== History ==
The king Anangpal Tomar I declared himself an independent ruler and established the Tomar Dynasty of Delhi in the early 8th century. He built his capital at the Anangpur village in Haryana and expanded his kingdom from there. He is said to have built numerous palaces and temples during his reign, majority of which are now completely diminished. Anangpal I is often misunderstood to be Anangpal II.

== Structure ==
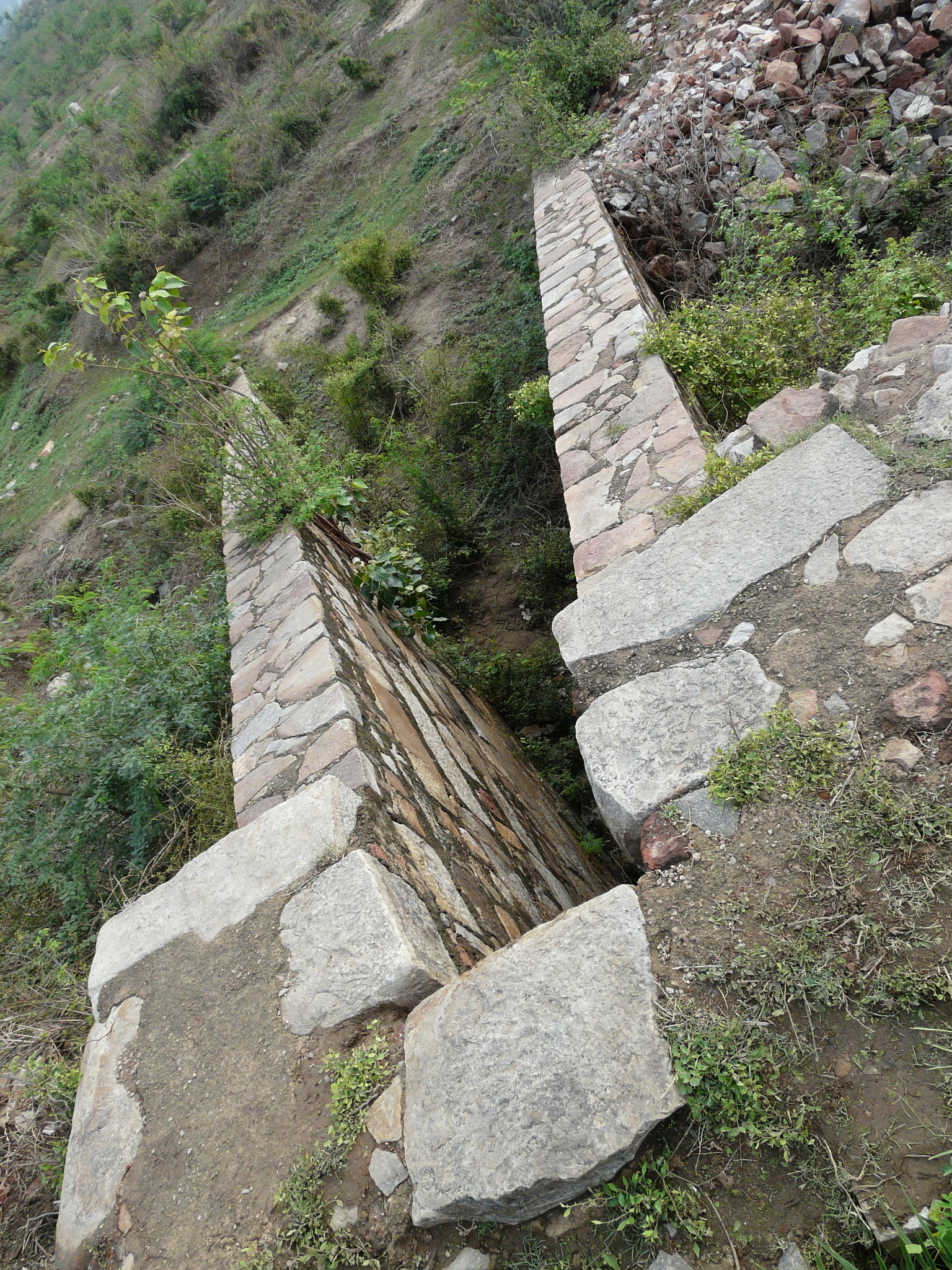
Sluice outlet from the dam

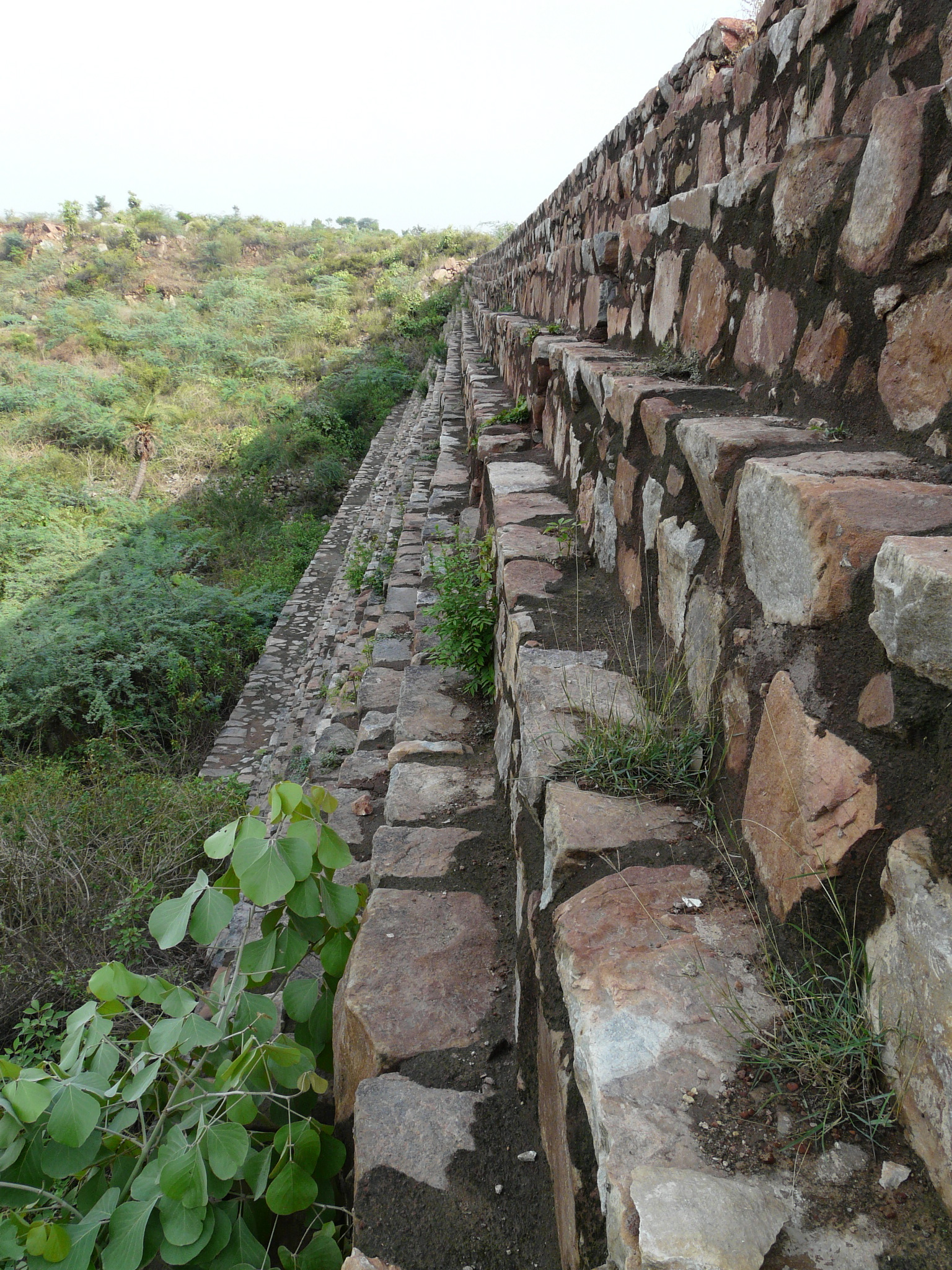
Downstream view of the dam

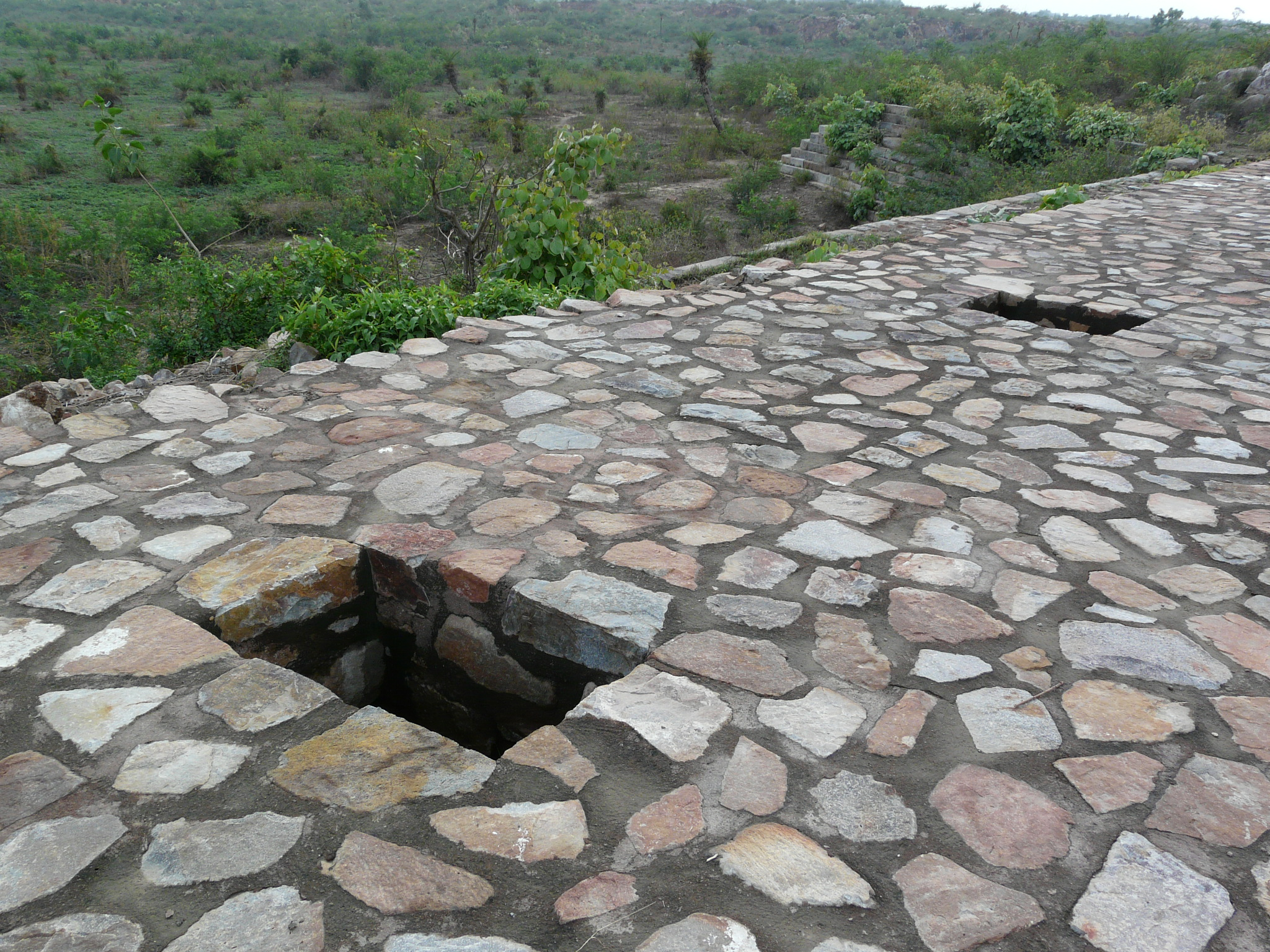
Gallery entry into the dam

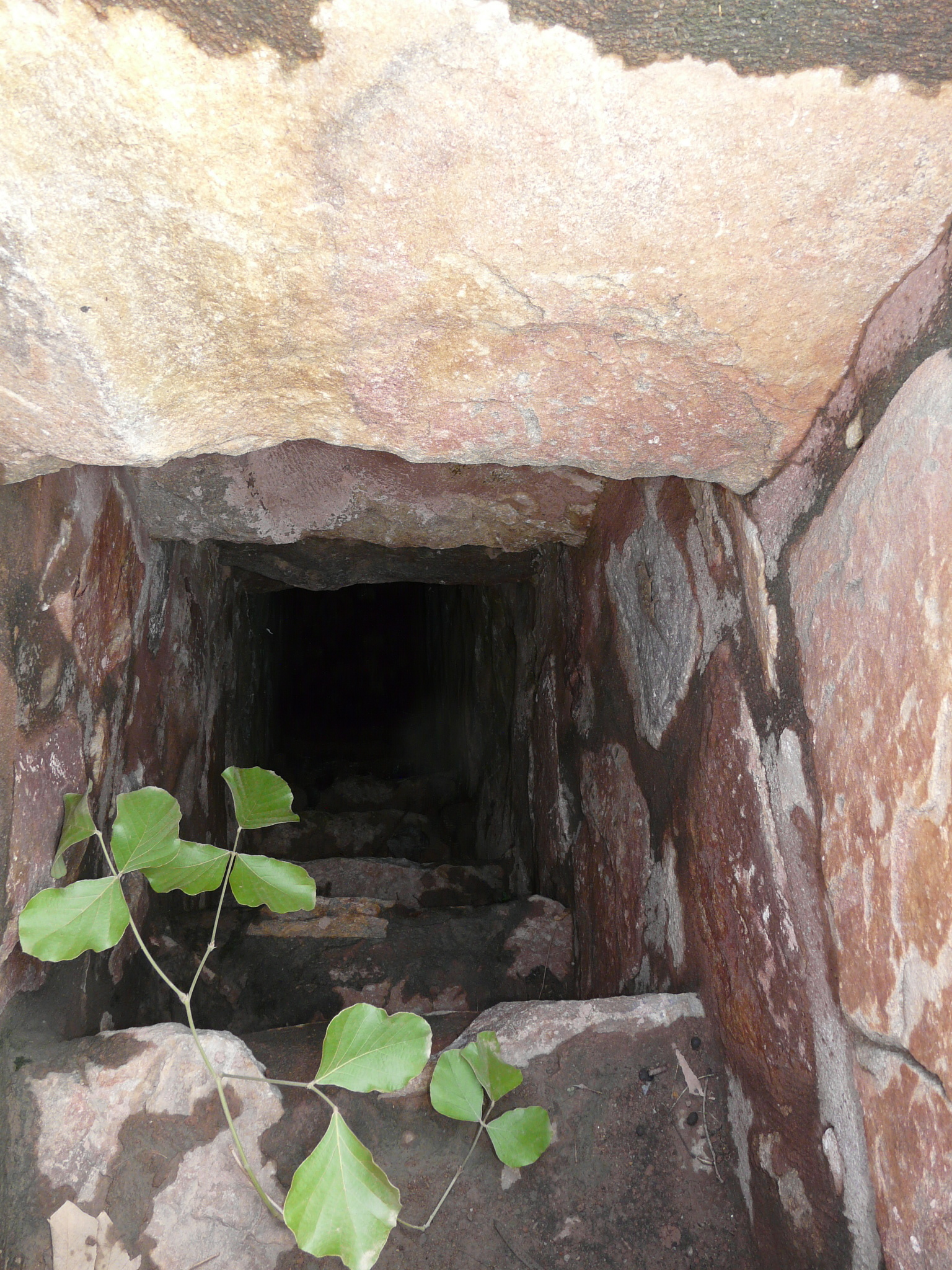
Steps into the gallery inside the dam

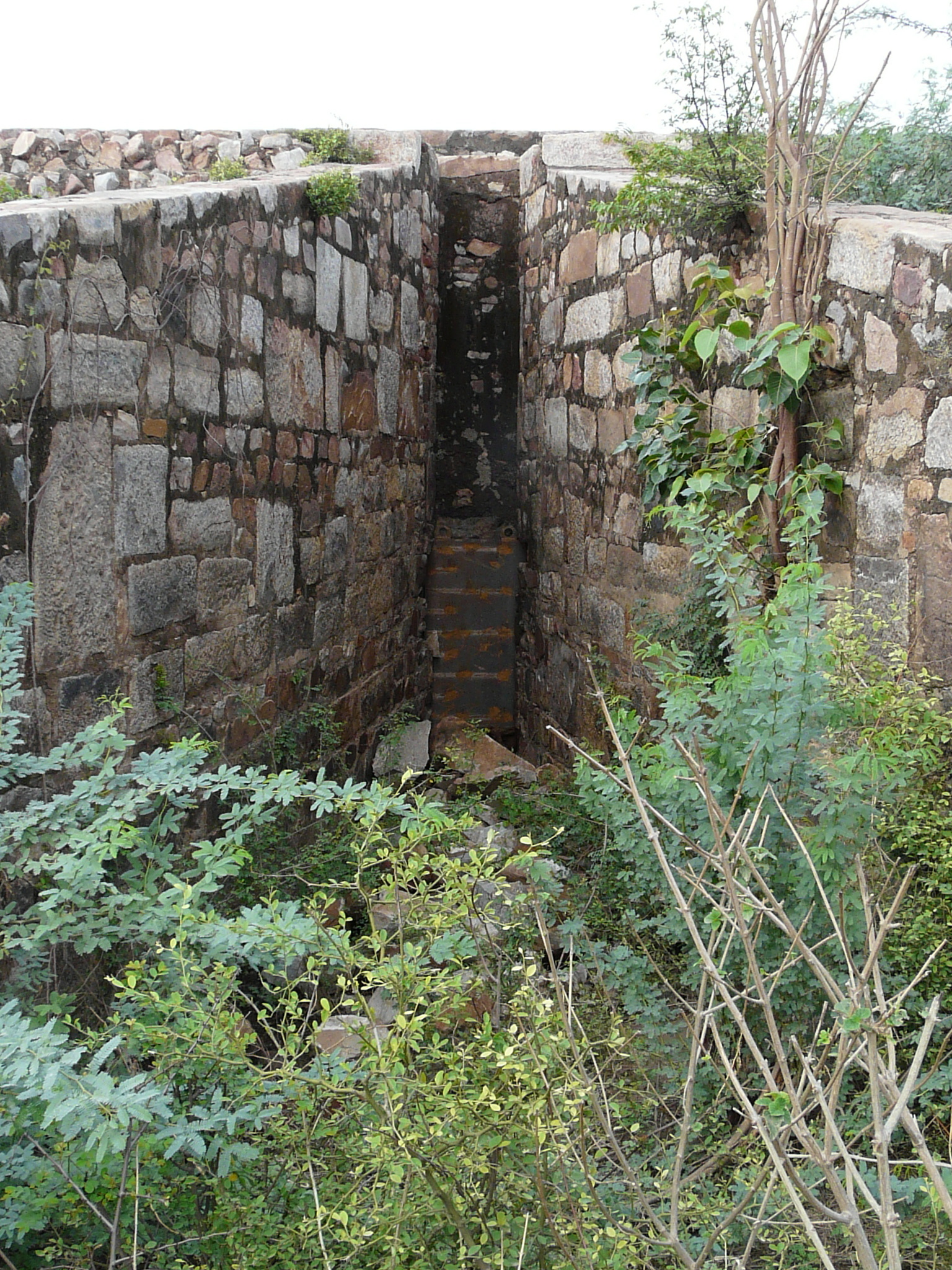
Sluice inlet in the dam

The ancient and solid gravity dam structure, a pre-Islamic structure that fords a local nala (stream) is 7 metres (23 ft) in height and 50 m (160 ft) in length between the two banks. It has been built with quartzite stones (locally available), duly chiselled and dressed, as a regular dam section with downstream base width increasing in steps with depth up to the foundation. It has entry manholes from the top of the dam, which lead into the body of the dam for inspection and control of flow through sluices for downstream uses. The intake entry into the sluice is on the upstream side. The downstream outlet end leads to the flat terrain below the dam at the ground level. The reservoir created by the dam is mostly silted over the centuries, but it is said to be in use.

== Topography ==
A local nala (stream) originating in the Aravalli hills was intercepted by building a dam at a chasm to store rain water. It is basically a water harvesting structure meant to store rain water during the monsoon season for beneficial uses of irrigation.

It is an important biodiversity area within the Northern Aravalli leopard wildlife corridor stretching from Sariska Tiger Reserve to Delhi. Historical places around the sanctuary are Badkhal Lake (6km northeast), 10th century ancient Surajkund reservoir, Damdama Lake, Tughlaqabad Fort and Adilabad ruins (both in Delhi), Chhatarpur Temple (in Delhi). It is contiguous to the seasonal waterfalls in Pali-Dhauj-Kot villages of Faridabad, the sacred Mangar Bani and the Asola Bhatti Wildlife Sanctuary.

== Access ==
It is approachable by road from Delhi from the Delhi - Mathura road. Anangpur, which is 1 kilometre (0.62 mi) from the dam, is 19 km (12 mi) from Delhi city and is approachable from Qutub Minar and Surajkund. But the access to the dam is through a path from the Anangpur village, which goes through flat pastureland and then over a rocky forested hill. Sarai metro station is nearest.

== See also ==
- Anangpal Tomar
- Lal Kot
- Surajkund
- List of dams and reservoirs in Haryana
