= Gwal Pahari =

- City
- Location of Gwal Pahari in Haryana Gwal Pahari (India)
- Coordinates: 28°26′05″N 77°08′40″E
- Country: India
- State: Haryana
- District: Gurgaon district

Government
  - Lok Sabha constituency: Gurgaon Lok Sabha Constituency
  - City: Gurgaon
  - Planning agency: Haryana Urban Development Authority
- Elevation: 217 m (712 ft)

Languages
- Time zone: UTC+5:30 (IST)
- PIN: 122003
- Area code: 0124
- Vehicle registration: HR-26 (City); HR-55 (Commercial); HR-72 (Sohna ) HR-76Pataudi (Gurgaon)
- Website: gurgaon.nic.in

Gwal Pahari is a city in Gurgaon Mandal in the Gurgaon District of Haryana state, India.

== Bandwari-Mangar bani hills biodiversity area ==
=== Forest ===
Bandhwari along with neighbouring villages of Gwal Pahari, Baliawas and Mangar Bani, which lies near the forest parts of Southern Delhi Ridge of Aravalli Range, is an ecologically sensitive under threat biodiversity area dotted with disused mining pits. The floura, fauna and ecology has degraded and severely needs restoration by replacing the invasive Vilayati kikar weed by the 3-layer cover of native grass, shrubs and trees. This area lies in the habitat of leopards.

=== Restoration ===
To restore the ground water recharge, the Haryana government is building check dam in the hills of bandhwari forest. This will protect the water logging in the rain as well as provide the water for the wild animals of forests during the dry summer months.

=== Concerns: Waste-to-energy plant and landfill ===
A waste-to-energy plant on which the government has already spent INR300 crore is being expanded with another INR400 crore with two of sand mine pits to be used for dumping the untreated toxic waste, this has caused serious environmental threat to the sensitive ecology.

In 2017, National Green Tribunal (NGT) asked the Central Pollution Control Board (CPCB) to the test the groundwater sample near Bandhwari plant as the landfill site has a stream of dirty black water pollution the aquafiers and leeching in to the forest in the area which is known to discharge industrial waste and construction debris in the Aravalli forests along the roads in Gurugram-Faridabad area.

== Pond rejuvenation ==
Government of Haryana is reviving various johads of Gurugram. In June 2020, for the revival of johad at Gwal Pahari, the estimates were being prepared to undertake erection of boundary wall, building a walking track around the Johad, clearing of bushes and planting of trees and to connect the seasonal rivulet to the johad to ensure it retains water year around.

== See also ==
- National Parks & Wildlife Sanctuaries of Haryana
