= Mangar Bani =

Hill forest in Haryana, India

- Village
- Location in Haryana, India Mangar Bani (India)
- Coordinates: 28.3787474°N 77.1731615°E
- Country: India
- State: Haryana
- District: Faridabad
- Time zone: UTC+5.30 (IST)

Mangar Bani is a Paleolithic archaeological site and sacred grove hill forest next to the Mangar village on Delhi-Haryana border. It lies in the South Delhi Ridge of Aravalli mountain range in Faridabad tehsil of Faridabad district in the Indian state of Haryana. It is to the immediate south of India's national capital Delhi, within the NCR.

Mangar Bani is the Indian subcontinent's largest neolithic tool making site dating back to 100,000 years Before Present (BP). It is also the first ever site discovered in the Aravalli Range containing cave paintings, which date back to 20,000-40,000 BP. This makes it the oldest human habitation discovered in Haryana and Delhi NCR.

Contiguous to Asola Bhatti Wildlife Sanctuary, Mangar Bani is an important biodiversity area within the Northern Aravalli leopard wildlife corridor stretching from Sariska Tiger Reserve to Delhi several wetlands, formed in the abandoned open pit mines in and around the area and have significance for the migratory birds, are Badkhal Lake, 10th century ancient Surajkund reservoir and Anangpur Dam, Damdama Lake, Tughlaqabad Fort and Adilabad ruins (both in Delhi).

There are concerns for its destruction due to littering, encroachment, and illegal construction in the nearby area. Activists have been demanding that government must implement a wide-ranging conservation plan, legally declare this area as the protected forest and protected archaeological site, and have it listed among the UNESCO World Heritage Sites of India.

== Background ==
=== Location ===
Mangar Bani and other villages, such as Gwal Pahari and Bandhwari, lie in the eco-sensitive area of at-risk forested hills of Southern Delhi Ridge in the Aravali range. Mangar Bani, adjacent to Mangar village, is a much larger forested area. It is 19 km east of Gurugaon DLF Phase I, 24 km northeast of Damdama Lake, 14 km west of Badkhal Lake, 22 km from Old Faridabad metro station and 28 km southwest of Okhla Industrial Estate.

=== Etymology ===
Mangar Bani, is a Haryanvi dialect term which means the "Mangar Vana" in Hindi or Sanskrit and "the Mangar Forest" in English.

=== History ===
Mangar Bani forest is a Neolithic site with stone tools and rock art dating back to 100,000 years Before Present (BP) and cave paintings dating back to 20,000-40,000 BP.

Mangar is a 700 years old village nestled in the rocky hills covered with native trees unique to the Aravalli Range, the oldest Plateau mountains in India.

== Village ==
=== Administration ===
Mangar is governed by the panchayat local governing body.

=== Demography ===
In 2011, it had a population of about 1965 persons living in 368 households.

=== Tribal jewellery museum ===
Mangar Tribal Jewellery museum, established by Sterre Sharma, the wife of former INC union minister Satish Sharma, has jewellery from all over India including the tribes of northeast India. This jewellery is made from glass, bone, brass, white metal, silver and gold plate.

== Ecology ==
=== Significance ===
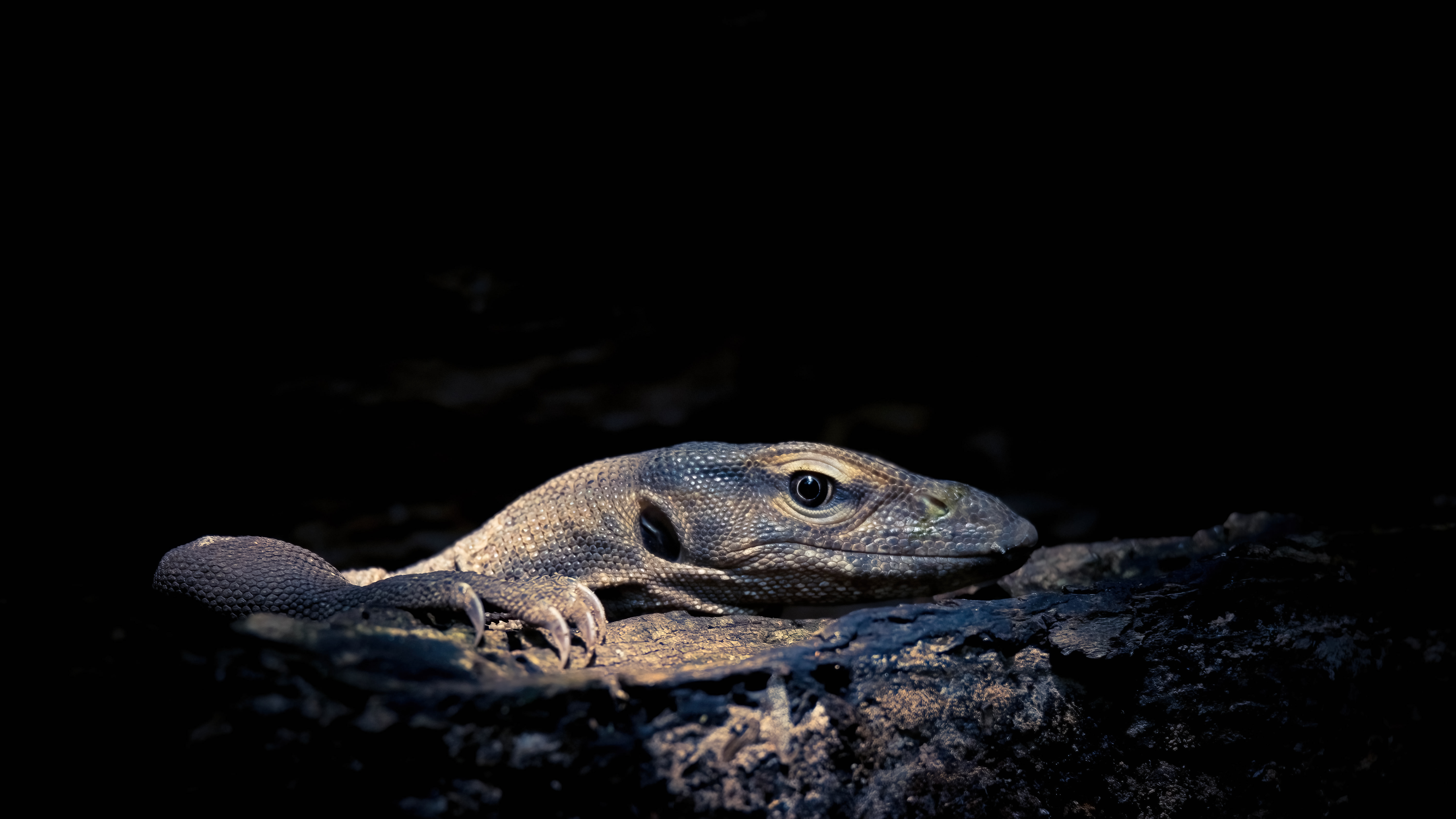
Basks in the morning sun

Mangar Bani has been studied by the biologists who found it to be a High-Biodiversity Zone. It is one of the last remaining natural tropical forest in the Aravalli Range. It has more than 30 native tree species thriving along with the 100 native shrubs and herbs, all of which provide shelter to the wildlife, rare birds, and animals including leopards. It acts as an important source of ground water recharge. It is an important biodiversity area, sacred grove, leopard and migratory birds habitat, and part of the Northern Aravalli leopard wildlife corridor with several wetlands.

=== Mangar Bani hills biodiversity area ===
Mangar Bani along with neighbouring villages of Gwal Pahari, Baliawas and Bandhwari, which lies near the forested parts of Southern Delhi Ridge of Aravalli Range, is an ecologically sensitive under threat biodiversity area dotted with disused mining pits. The flora, fauna, and ecology has degraded which severely needs restoration by replacing the invasive Vilayati kikar weed with the 3-layer cover of native grass, shrubs and trees. This area lies in the habitat of leopards. 95% of the forest is covered with the slow-growing dhau tree (anogeissus pendula). Mangar Bani has native plant species such as Dhau and wild eagle can be seen here.

=== Leopard habitat and wildlife corridor ===
Mangar Bani is an important leopard habitat and it also lies within the Northern Aravalli leopard wildlife corridor stretching from Sariska Tiger Reserve to Delhi.

=== Sacred grove surrounding Gudariya Das Baba temple ===
Mangar bani is a sacred grove as it surrounds Gudariya Das Baba temple, which is within Mangar Bani forest and lies is 2 km to the northwest of Mangar village. This ancient temple provides the status of sacred grove to Mangar Bani. According to the local oral tradition, the baba (saint) Gudariya Das protects this bani (forest) and punishes anyone who damages this forest.

=== Wetlands: Lulu Lake ===
Lulu Lake wetland is nestled on the hills of Mangar Bani, 6 km to the southwest of Mangar village and 4 km south of Gudariya Das Baba temple. Its near mount Gaga Lulu, a small hill.

== Prehistoric Stone Age sites ==
=== Significance ===
Spread over 5000 ha, Mangar Bani is the largest discovered pre-historic site and Stone Age tool making factory in the Indian subcontinent, and the first ever site discovered in the Aravalli range with cave paintings. Stone tools and rock art dating back to 100,000 years BP and cave paintings dating back to 20,000-40,000 BP have been found. This site is also the oldest human habitation discovered in Haryana and Delhi NCR. Findings from this site have pushed back the anthropogenic history of Haryana and NCR by several thousand years.

It is in the forest area where cave paintings and tools from the Paleolithic period were discovered. Archaeologists discovered cave paintings and stone tools in the Mangar Bani hill forest in May 2021; the tools found at the site are estimated to be 100,000 years old. It is likely the largest Paleolithic site in the Indian subcontinent. According to the Haryana Archaeology and Museums Department, "On the basis of this exploration, it can be said that this may be one of the biggest Palaeolithic sites in the Indian sub-continent, where stone age tools were recovered from different open-air sites as well as from rock shelters. Though tools from the Palaeolithic Age have been identified earlier in parts of the Aravallis, it is for the first time that cave paintings and rock art of a large magnitude have been found in Haryana."

The Aravalli Range contains numerous other archaeologically significant sites, including Khanak, a copper mine and copper smelter belonging to the Indus Valley Civilization (IVC) period in Tosham Hill range.

=== Number of scattered sites ===
Mangar Bani is spread across 5000 ha only and it is surrounded by several hundred times larger forested Aravali Range. In June 2021, a 3-day survey identified several scattered Neolithic sites within Mangar Bani alone. As of July 2021, Haryana Archaeological dept had plan to survey the entire Mangar Bani.

Similar group of 43 Paleolithic sites with microliths tools and rock art was found on an axis from Ankhir (a village 17 km east of Mangar Bani) in south to north along Anangpur-Angnpur Dam-Surajkund-Tughlaqabad. These sites are on the 'Tughlaqabad-Surajkund Road' and south of 'Surajkund-Faridabad Road', on Anangpur hills, and on Ankhir hill, and on the road embracing the low ridge from Faridabad (Ankhir) to Surajkund. From a study of the prehistoric findings along the ridges of Surajkund reservoir, Anagpur Dam, and around Delhi and adjoining parts of Haryana, it has been inferred that the southern hilly area of Delhi and Haryana was environmentally suited for pre-historic man to settle here.

=== Findings ===
==== Middle Paleolithic era: Stone tools factory ====
In the midst of the Mangar bani forest in the high hills area, the archeologists also discovered some tools that belong to the Paleolithic period. Stone Age tools are found in various outdoor locations and rock shelters.

==== Middle Paleolithic era: Cave paintings ====
Cave painting is a type of rock art that includes petroglyphs, or engravings, found on the wall or ceilings of caves. Mangarbani hill forest is a Palaeolithic site with rock art as well as cave paintings. It is believed to be the largest in the Indian subcontinent and possibly the world's oldest.

On the basis of tool topology, it can be said that the date of prehistoric habitation at the site may be from about 1,00,000 to about 15,000 years ago. But we have also found evidence of later habitation, even up to 8th-9th century AD

— Banani Bhattacharyya, Deputy Director of Haryana Archaeology & Museums Department.

==== Upper Paleolithic rock art ====
Pattern of rock art drawing had evolved, some being older and simpler line drawings "when humans hadn't really figured out how to draw complex patterns", which later evolved into more refined patterns such as "different geometric shapes, foliage, animals and human figures" including cup marks like symbols presumably for some special purpose for the inhabitants of that era. Most paintings are ochre colored (see also Ochre Coloured Pottery culture which is unrelated to the site and dates to much later era), but there white paintings which indicates that both belong to different historic eras. Study of these will help ascertain how "early humans developed their tool making skills".

=== Conservation and further research ===
This is the first time a discovery of the same kind has been made in the Aravali Range in Haryana. Though mining destroyed many of the associated caves and hills, the area is vast, and there is much to discover. As of July 2021, entire South Ride of Aravalli in Haryana will be mapped, further research and documentation will be carried out, including radiocarbon dating to precisely determine age of the findings which will help in ascertaining which aspects belong to the Upper Paleolithic (early Paleolithic) and which to the Lower Paleolithic (early Paleolithic) era.

As of 31 July 2021, Head of HAD, Ashok Khemka, informed that proposal to notify this area as protected archaeological site has been sent by Haryana Archaeological Dept (HAD) to Govt of Haryana (GoH), and HAD is awaiting gazette notification by the GoH after which this site will become legally protected. Meanwhile, district land and revenue administration of Faridabad was undertaking ground truthing exercise, to verify the data, to ascertain the landscape and confirm the type and ownership of the land, which will be sent to HAD to help with attainment of protected status and consequent conservation. Activists have demanded the protected status for the entire South Ridge and not just the Mangar Bani.

Khemka asserted that HAD will engage National Research Laboratory for Conservation of Cultural Property (NRLC) Lucknow, Birbal Sahni Institute of Palaeosciences (BSIP) Lucknow, Physical Research Laboratory (PRL) Ahmedabad for conservation of rockart and paintings. Khemka asserted that the whole area will be extensively surveyed to find any additional sites, entire area of Delhi South Ridge of Aravali in Haryana between Gurugram and Faridabad will be mapped and each site will be GPS tagged. Large scale scientific excavations, scientific dating of paintings and excavated sediments will be undertaken. Earlier, in 1986, rock paintings were found at 43 sites in the area of historic Anangpur village (capital of Anangpal Tomar (Anangpal II) of Tomara dynasty c.736- 1052 CE who also built Delhi's Lal Kot before they were overthrown by Chahamanas of Shakambhari, last king of Chahamanas or Chauhans was Prithviraj Chauhan), Mangar Bani site might be an extension of the Anangpur Group of Paleolithic Sites.

== Concerns and conservation ==
=== Threats ===
==== Encroachments, illegal logging and construction ====
Encroachment, illegal tree felling, illegal construction are major threats to the forest. Nearby Bandhwari Waste-to-energy plant and landfill is already causing an environmental threat to the sensitive ecology by leeching toxic pollutants in the forest and aquifers. In 2017, National Green Tribunal (NGT) ordered the Central Pollution Control Board (CPCB) to the test the groundwater sample near Bandhwari plant.

==== Littering and vandalism ====
As of July 2021, the site was unprotected both in terms of physical security as well as legal forests and archaeological status. Site is littered with trash, such as empty beer bottles, cola cans, cigarette butts, wrappers of snacks. As the more people visit this unsecured and vulnerable site, which is also exposed to the weather and erosion, will expedite the deterioration of site.

=== Conservation ===
==== Unprotected legal status ====
Mangar Bani, which was panchayat common land till 1970 was converted to private land in the 1980s, and in 2012 the union environment ministry put the Mangar Development plan on hold. Though as early as 2015, Chief Minister of Haryana, Manohar Lal Khattar, had announced that Mangar Bani will be declared a protected forest with a 500-meter buffer zone, as of July 2021, with its at-risk ecology, yet to be protected under the Forests Act.

==== Demand for protected forest and archaeological site status ====
As of July 2021, the site was unprotected both in terms of physical security as well as legal forests and archaeological status. Site is littered with trash, such as empty beer bottles, cola cans, cigarette butts, wrappers of snacks. As the more people visit this unsecured and vulnerable site, which is also exposed to the weather and erosion, will expedite the deterioration of site. Both, the officials of Haryana Archaeological Department and wildlife activists, agree that the forests of Mangar Bani and Gurgaon-Faridabad Aravalli must be legally declared a heritage-eco zone to ensure the area is protected from illegal mining and encroachment. Sunil Harsana, the wildlife activist who discovered the site underscores this by saying, "The site needs urgent protection. You never know who will visit the site and carve their name or ‘hearts’ alongside the prehistoric carvings, just for the fun of it." Director of Haryana Archaeological Department said "We don't even know how many of these sites must have been destroyed because of mining and exploitation of the Aravallis. They need urgent protection. As the oldest mountain range in the world, they carry important clues to help us understand our origins and have a lot of stories to tell about the Indian subcontinent."

==== Future conservation plan, heritage and eco-tourism ====
With a conservation plan, site can be developed for heritage and eco-tourism, providing economic and employment opportunities for the residents of the area. Ashok Khemka, Principal Secretary to Haryana government, said in early July that the Haryana Archaeological Department will legally protected by "issuing orders to protect Mangar Bani under Section 4 of the Punjab Ancient and Historical Monuments and Archaeological Sites and Remains Act, 1964, and that experts in paleolithic cave paintings will be carrying out an extensive survey of the area."

There are demands by activists to prepare and implement a time-bound conservation plan, with the fixed accountability of the concerned officials, to have it declared as the UNESCO World Heritage Site.

== See also ==
Mesolithic archaeological sites

- Anangpur Caves (Faridabad)
- Bhimbetka rock shelters (Bhopal)
- Pahargarh Caves (Morena)

Biodiversity and ecology

- Gurugram Leopard and Deer Safari
- Leopards of Haryana
- National Parks & Wildlife Sanctuaries of Haryana

History and culture

- Haryana Tourism
- List of State Protected Monuments in Haryana
- List of Monuments of National Importance in Haryana
- Potential UNESCO World Heritage Sites in India
- Surajkund International Crafts Mela
- Tourism in Haryana
