= Sariska Tiger Reserve =

Protected area in India

- IUCN category IV (habitat/species management area)
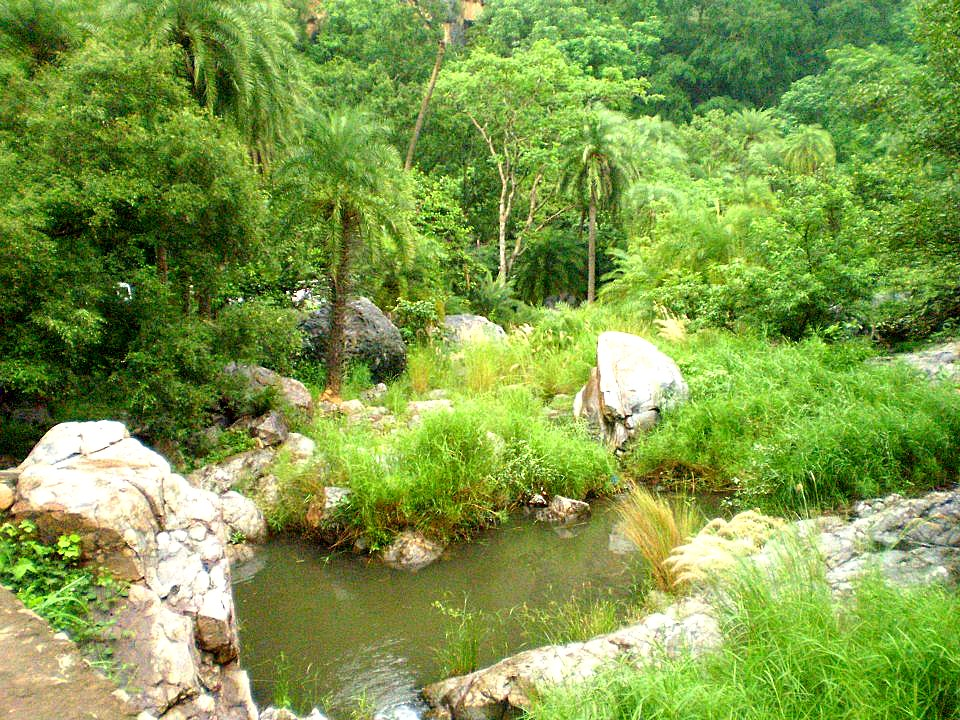
- Jungle in Sariska Tiger Reserve

- Location within Rajasthan Location within India
- Interactive map of Sariska Tiger Reserve
- Location: Alwar District, Rajasthan, India
- Nearest city: Alwar
- Coordinates: 27°19′3″N 76°26′13″E
- Area: 1,203.34 km^{2} (464.61 sq mi)
- Established: 1979
- Governing body: Government of Rajasthan

Sariska Tiger Reserve is a tiger reserve in Alwar district of Rajasthan, India. It stretches over 1,203.34 km^{2} (464.61 sq mi) including a core area of 881 km^{2} (340 sq mi) and a buffer zone 322.23 km^{2} (124.41 sq mi). Its habitat consists of scrub-thorn arid forests, dry deciduous forests, grasslands, and rocky hills.

The Sariska forest area was first recognized as a wildlife reserve in 1955. This area was preserved for hunting, for the Alwar state and was declared a wildlife sanctuary in 1958. It was given the status of a tiger reserve making it a part of India's Project Tiger in 1978. The wildlife sanctuary was declared a national park in 1982, with a total area of about 273.8 km^{2} (105.7 sq mi).

== Geography ==
Sariska Tiger Reserve is a part of the Aravalli Range and the Khathiar-Gir dry deciduous forests ecoregion.

- Elevation: between 300 and 722 m (984 and 2,369 ft)
- Rainfall: average 700 mm (28 in) per year
- Forest types: tropical, dry, deciduous, and tropical thorn

== Flora ==
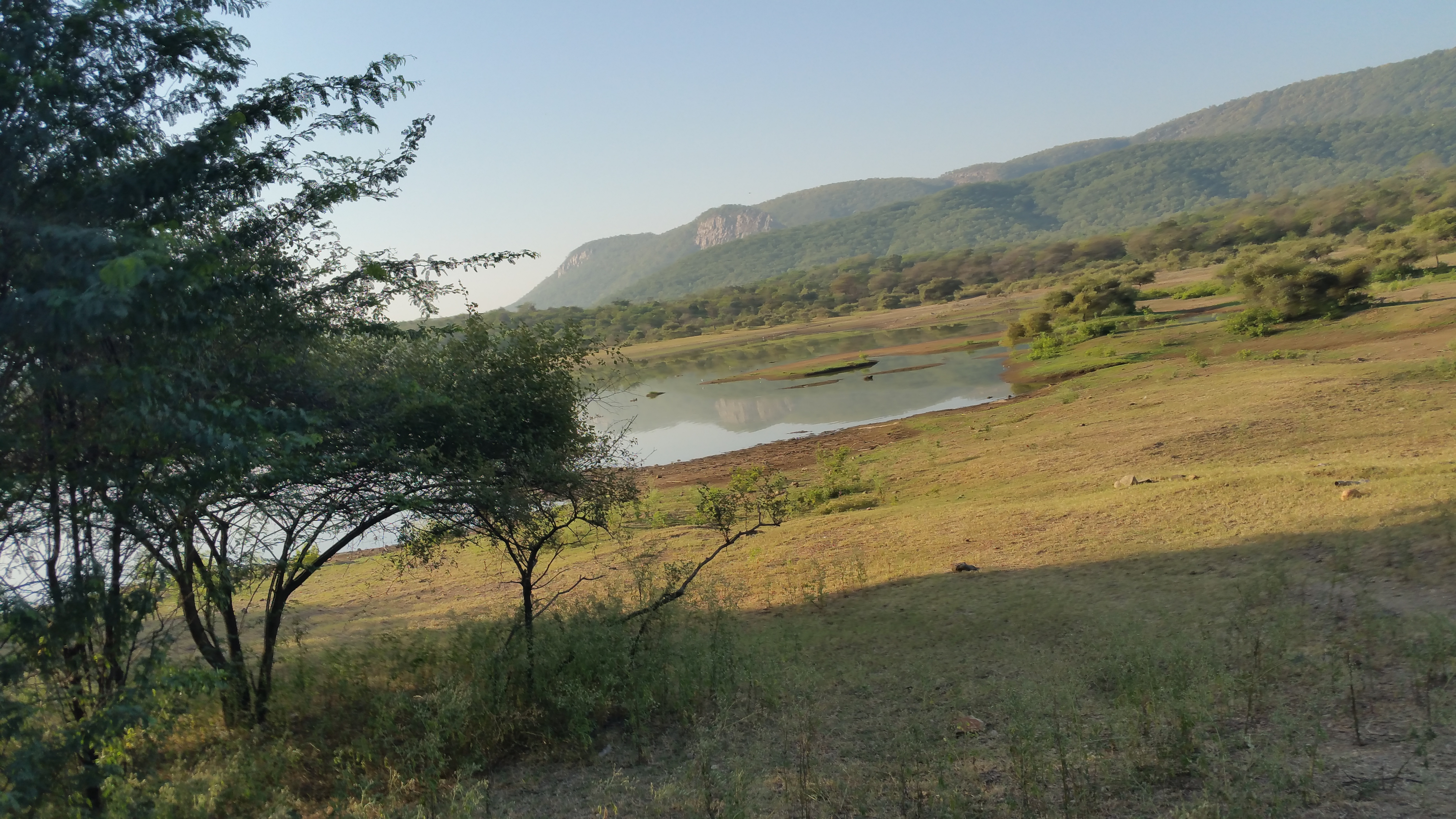
Sariska Tiger Reserve view

The dominant tree in the forests is dhok (Anogeissus pendula). Other trees include the salar (Boswellia serrata), kadaya (Sterculia urens), dhak (Butea monosperma), gol (Lannea coromandelica), ber (Ziziphus mauritiana) and khair (Acacia catechu). Bargad (Ficus benghalensis), arjun (Terminalia arjuna), gugal (Commiphora wightii) or bamboo. Shrubs are numerous, such as kair (Capparis decidua), adusta (Adhatoda vesica) and jhar ber (Ziziphus nummularia).

== Fauna ==
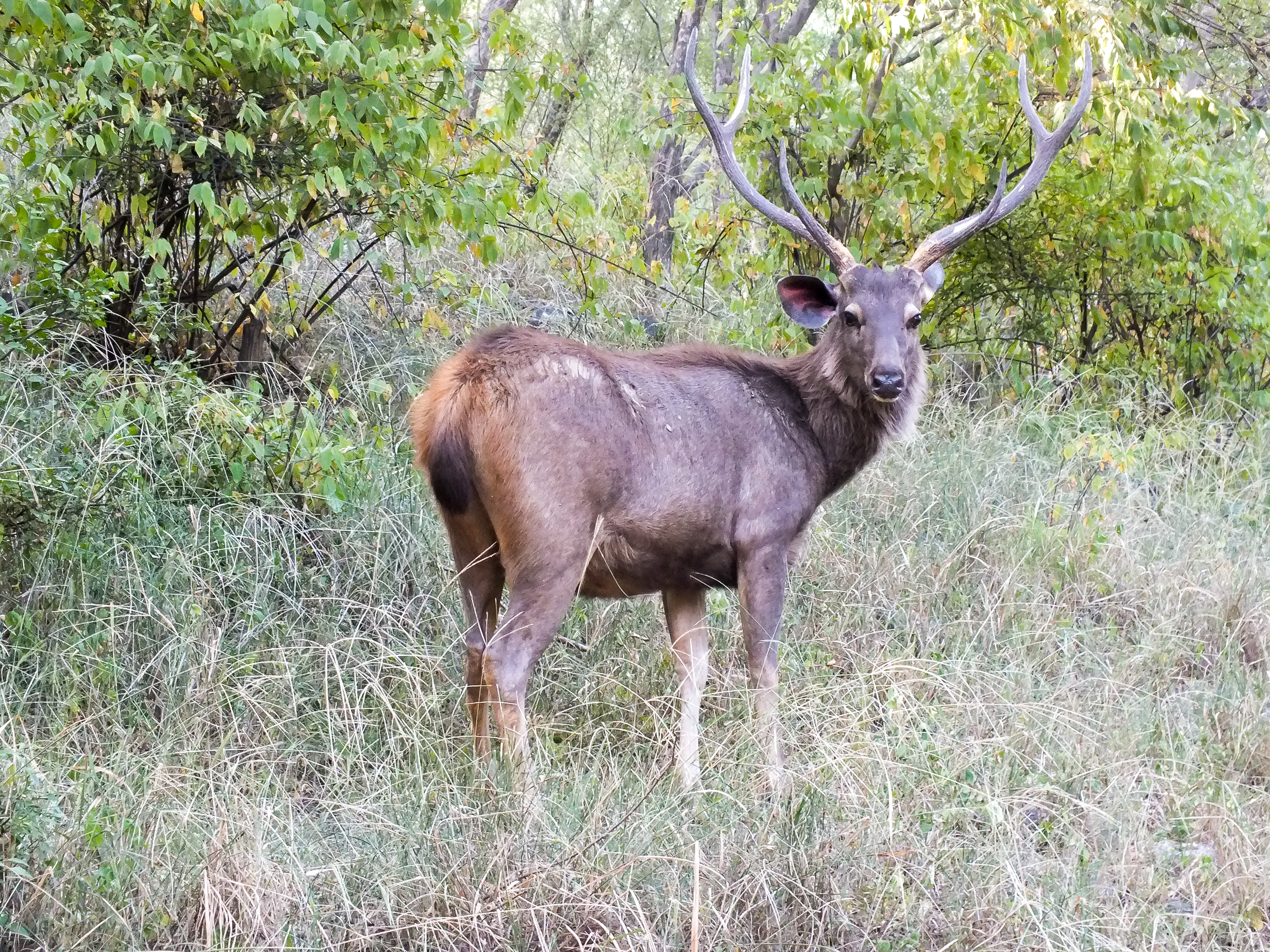
Sambar deer in Sariska

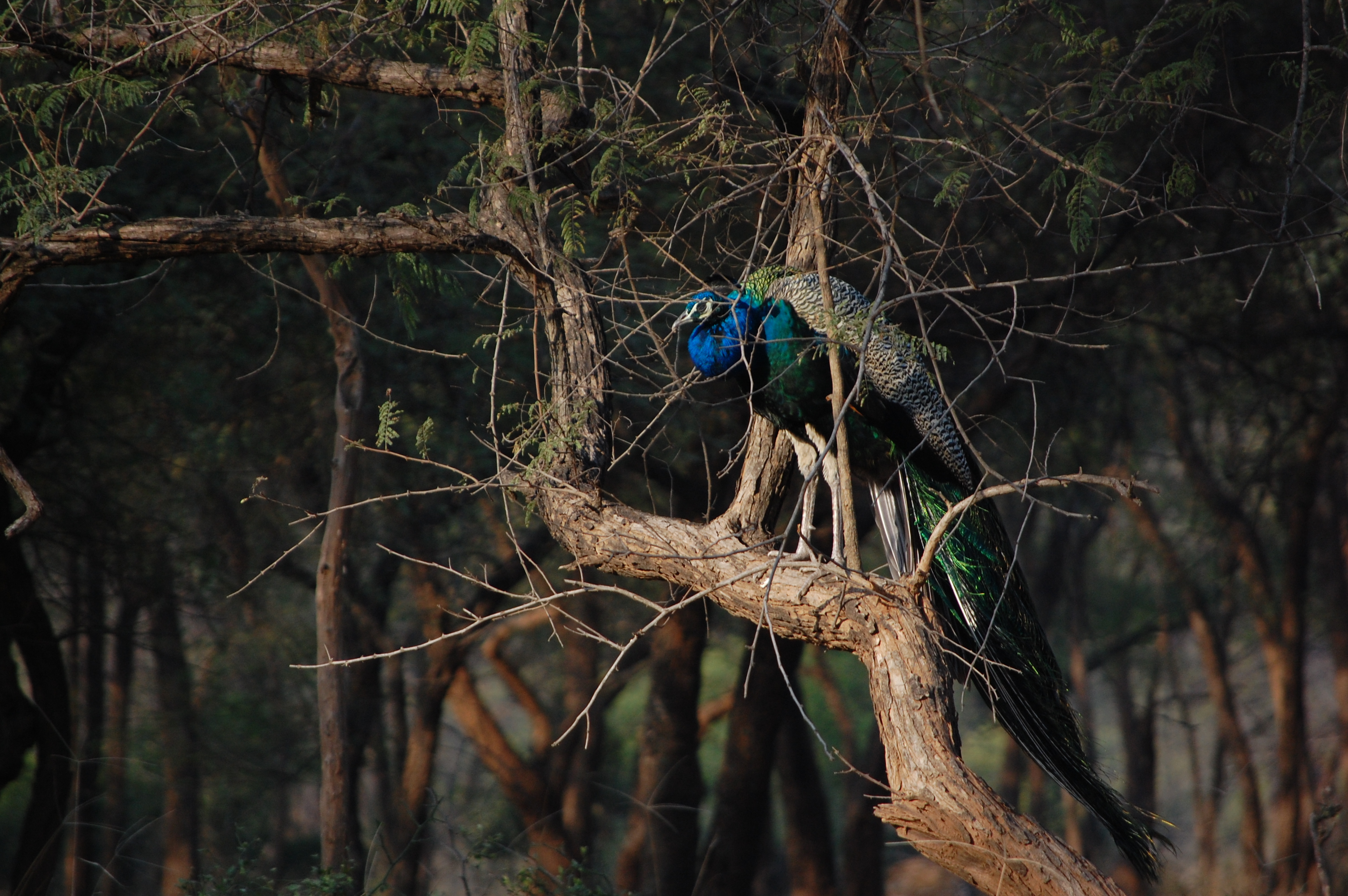
Peacock in Sariska

Apart from the Bengal tiger, the reserve harbours many wildlife species, including sloth bear, Indian leopard, jungle cat, caracal, striped hyena, golden jackal, chital, sambar deer, nilgai, wild boar, small Indian civet, Javan mongoose, ruddy mongoose, honey badger, rhesus macaque, and Northern plains gray langur, and Indian hare. Bird species present include grey francolin, white-throated kingfisher, Indian peafowl, bush quail, sandgrouse, treepie, golden-backed woodpecker, crested serpent eagle, and the Indian eagle-owl.

== Tiger extinction and relocation ==
=== Tiger extension ===
In 2003, 16 tigers lived in the reserve. In 2004, it was reported that no tigers were sighted in the reserve, and that no indirect evidence of tiger presence was found, such as pug marks, scratch marks on trees, or scats. The Rajasthan Forest Department explained that "the tigers had temporarily migrated outside the reserve and would be back after the monsoon season". Project Tiger staff backed this assumption. In January 2005, it was reported that there were no tigers left in Sariska.

In July 2008, two tigers from Ranthambhore National Park were relocated to Sariska Tiger Reserve. Another female tiger was relocated in February 2009.

In 2012, two tiger cubs and their mother were spotted in the reserve bringing the total number of tigers to seven with five adults. In July 2014, two more cubs were spotted, so that there were 11 tigers in total.

As of October 2018, there were 18 tigers including five cubs. By 2020, the tiger population in the reserve has risen to 20. Tiger population rose to 30 tigers in 2023.

=== Relocation efforts ===
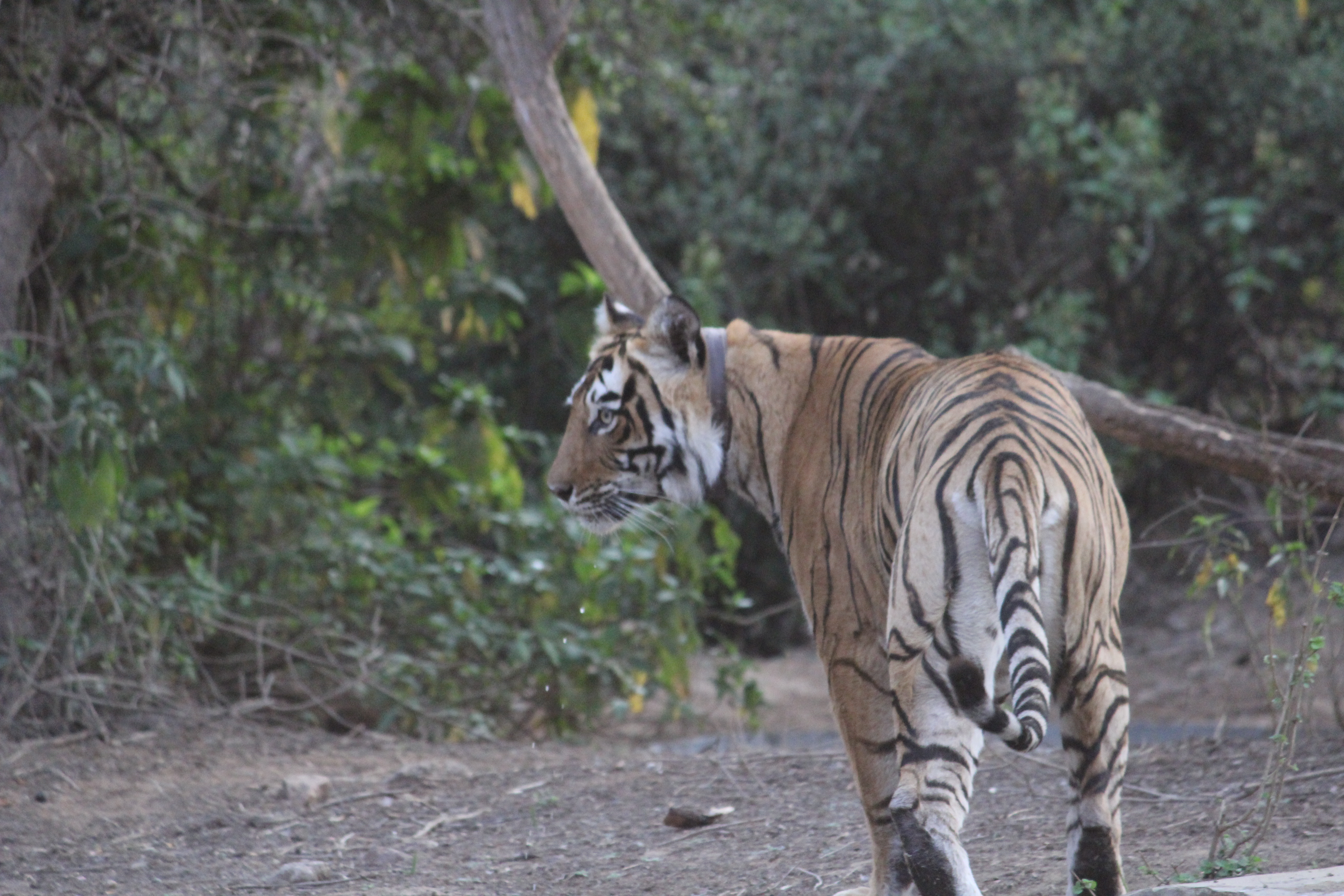
Tiger in Sariska Tiger Reserve. The collar around its neck is used to track and monitor it.

In 2005, the Government of Rajasthan, in cooperation with the Government of India and Wildlife Institute of India, planned the re-introduction of tigers to Sariska and also the relocation of villages. Plans to construct a bypass were also discussed. It was decided to import one male and two females from Ranthambore National Park. The Wildlife Institute of India along with the Government of Rajasthan started tracking the relocated tigers with the help of ISRO's reconnaissance satellites. The first aerial translocation of the male tiger from Ranthambhore to Sariska was carried out on 28 June 2008 by helicopter.

Only two of the four villages' experts were actually moved, though the second, Kankwari, was shifted long after the tigers were re-introduced. However, Kankwari fort has been renovated by the state tourism department, which can possibly violate wildlife protection norms. The first relocated village was Bhagani. The diversion of roads crossing the reserve, an issue critical to the survival of its wildlife, continues to be a problem.

One more tigress was shifted to Sariska from Ranthambhore in February 2009. On 28 July 2010, another tigress was brought from Ranthambhore National Park. Totaling five tigers—two males and three females—were living in the reserve until November 2010 when the first relocated tiger died due to poisoning. The first three of the relocated tigers came from one father, and the first two tigresses have the same mother.

== See also ==
- Leopards of Haryana
- Arid Forest Research Institute
- Indian Council of Forestry Research and Education
