= Sacred groves of Biodiversity Park, Visakhapatnam =

Sacred groves in Andhra Pradesh

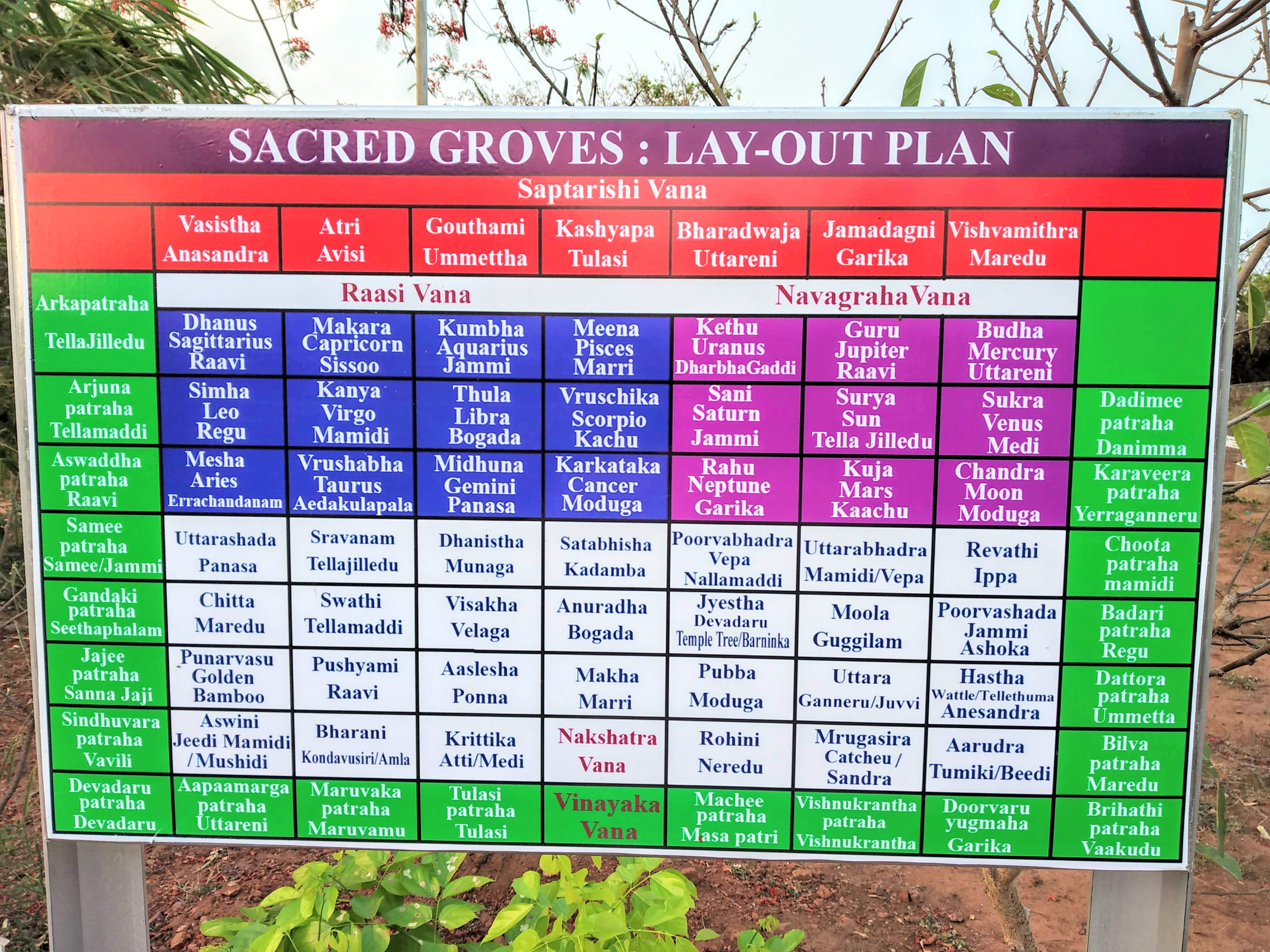
- Sacred groves zone lay out plan
- Interactive map of Sacred groves of Biodiversity Park, Visakhapatnam
- Type: Biodiversity park / educative botanical garden
- Location: Rani Chandramani Devi Government Hospital, Pedda Waltair, Visakhapatnam, Andhra Pradesh, India
- Coordinates: 17.7290304°N 83.3364321°E
- Status: Open all year

The sacred groves is a zone of Biodiversity Park, Visakhapatnam located in the premises of Rani Chandramani Devi Government Hospital. It has more than 100 sacred plant species, which are medicinal herbs with religious importance. Many sacred plants are becoming rare and endangered. Hence they are to be reared, protected, and conserved. The zone was inaugurated on February 5, 2017, by Kambhampati Hari Babu, a member of parliament from Visakhapatnam, Andhra Pradesh.

== Sacred plant species of the park in general ==
More than 300 tree species mentioned in holy books (Bhagvad Gita, Ramayana, Mahabharata, Bible, Quran, Tripitaka, Zend-Avesta, Guru Granth Sahib) related to different religions (Hinduism, Christianity, Islam, Jainism, Buddhism, and Sikhism) are reared in different zones of the Biodiversity Park. Many tree species are commonly seen in more than one religion. For example, fig (Ficus carica) is almost common to all religions. Date palm (Phoenix dactylifera), olive (Olea europaea), pomegranate (Punica granatum), cypress (Cupressus sempervirens) are common to Christians and Muslims. Neem (Azadirachta indica), sacred fig or peepal or bodhi (Ficus religiosa), sal (Shorea robusta), sandal wood (Santalum album), bilva (Aegle marmelos) are common to Hindus, Buddhists and Jains. Banyan (Ficus bengalensis) and sacred fig (Ficus religiosa) are common to Hinduism, Buddhism, Jainsism, Judaism and Christianity. The maidenhair tree (Ginkgo biloba) is viewed as a sacred tree in all religions of China, Korea and Japan.

Some of the notable sacred plant species of the park are: maidenhair tree (Ginkgo biloba), Christmas tree (Araucaria excelsa), peepal/sacred fig/aswaddha (Ficus religiosa), banyan/marri/vata (Ficus benghalensis), ashoka tree (Saraca asoca), date palm (Phoenix dactylifera), Indian cedar / deodar (Cedrus deodara), cypress (Cupressus sempervirens), olive (Olea europaea), neem (Azadirachta indica), mango (Mangifera indica), kadamba (Anthocephalus cadamba), sandal wood (Santalum album), sami or jammi (Prosopis cineraria), bel, bilva or maredu (Aegle marmelos), moduga/flame of the forest (Butea monosperma), holy cross / calabash tree (Crescentia cujete), Indian lotus or padmam (Nelumbo nucifera), basilicum / tulasi (Ocimum sanctum), and rudraksha (Elaeocarpus ganitrus).

== Sacred plant categories of the Sacred Grove Zone ==
The Sacred Groves Zone of the Biodiversity Park contains more than 100 plants under five categories namely Ganesha vana, Nakshatra vana, Raasi vana, Saptarishi vana and Navagraha vana. The pictures are shown in the gallery. Some plants or trees are common to more than one vana or garden. For example, raavi / peepal / sacred fig (Ficus religiosa) is common to Ganesha vana, Raasi vana, Saptarishi vana and Nakshtra vana. Similarly sandra / chandra / kachu (Acacia catechu) is common to Nakshatra vana, Navagraha vana and Raasi vana. Samee / jemmi (Prosopis cineraria) / (Prosopis spicigera) is common to Ganesha vana, Nakshatra vana, Navagraha vana and Raasi vana. Bilva / maredu / bael (Aegle marmelos) is common to Ganesha vana, Nakshatra vana and Saptarishi vana.

=== Ganesha vana – Ganesha garden with 21 plants ===
This consists of 21 leaves (Aeakavimshathi patraha) of 21 plant species connected with the worship of Lord Ganesha.

This might also be the same as the Siddhivinayak Mandala Vaatika, where the garden is designed as per sacred geometry dedicated to SiddhiVinayak, another name for Lord Ganesha.

A Mandala Vaatika, simply put, is a garden that is structured like a Mandala (i.e. in a circular geometric designs). However, in Vedic times, these gardens were created as per very specific mathematical calculations, patterns and measurements. Each deity and planet has their own unique Mandala geometry. These gardens were treated as sacred groves where one could meditate and experience the vibrations of these deities.

So, in ancient India one could meditate in a Rudra Mandala Vaatika, a Durga Mandala Vaatika, a Murugan Mandala Vaatika, a Varamahalakshmi Mandala Vaatika or even a Saptarishi Mandala Vaatika dedicated to the 7 most revered sages.

S.no	Sanskrit name of the leaf	Common name of the tree	Botanical name	Family
1	Machee patraha	Masapatri	Artemisia vulgaris	Asteraceae
2	Brihatee patraha	a. nela munaga / mulla vankayi b. vakudu	a. Solanum surattense / Solanum xanthocarpum b. Carissa carandas	a. Solanaceae b. Apocynaceae
3	Bilva patraha	Bilva / maredu / bael	Aegle marmelos	Rutaceae
4	Doorvaru yugmaha	Garika	Cynodon dactylon	Poaceae
5	Datura patraha	Datura / ummetta	Datura metel	Solanaceae
6	Badari patraha	a. regu / Indian jujube b. Chinese jujube	a. Ziziphus mauritiana b. Ziziphus jujuba	Rhamnaceae
7	Apamarga patrah	Uttareni	Achyranthes aspera	Amaranthaceae
8	Tulasi patraha	Tulasi / sacred basil	Ocimum sanctum / Ocimum tenuiflorum	Lamiaceae
9	Choota patraha	Mamidi / mango	Mangifera indica	Anacardiaceae
10	Karaveera patraha	a. yerra ganneru / oleander b. pachha ganneru / yellow oleander	a. Nerium indicum b. Thevetia peruviana	a. Apocynaceae b. Apocynaceae
11	Vishnukranta patraha	Vishnukranta	Evolvulus alsinoides	Convolvulaceae
12	Dadimee patraha	Pomegranate / danimma	Punica granatum	Punicaceae
13	Devadaru patraha	a. devadaru b. pine c. local devadaru / pagadamu chettu / red cedar	a. Cedrus deodara b. Pinus roxburghii c. Erythroxylum monogynum	a. Pinaceae b. Pinaceae c. Linaceae
14	Maruvaka patraha	Maruvamu	Origanum vulgare	Lamiaceae
15	Sindhuvara patraha	Vavili	Vitex negundo	Verbenaceae
16	Jajee patraha	Jaji / sanna jaji	Jasminum grandiflorum	Oleaceae
17	Gandaki patraha	a. sita phalam b. devakanchanamu	a. Annona squamosa b. Bauhinia acuminata	a. Annonaceae b. Fabaceae
18	Samee patraha	Samee / jemmi	Prosopis cineraria / Prosopis spicigera	Fabaceae
19	Aswaddha patraha	Raavi / peepal / sacred fig	Ficus religiosa	Moraceae
20	Arjuna patraha	Arjuna / tella maddi	Terminalia arjuna	Combretaceae
21	Arca patraha	Tella jilledu / swetarca	Calotropis procera / Calotropis gigantea	Asclepiadaceae / Apocynaceae

=== Nakshatra vana - garden with plants for 27 stars ===
The nakshatra vana comprises plant species connected with the 27 stars or star constellations of Indian astrology.

S.no	Name of the nakshatra / star	Common name of the tree	Botanical name	Family
1	Ashwini	a. mushidi / vishamusthi b. jeedimamidi / cashewnut	a. Strychnos nux-vomica b. Anacardium occidentale	a. Loganiaceae b. Anacardiaceae
2	Bharani	Konda vusiri / amla / Indian gooseberry	Phyllanthus emblica	Euphorbiaceae
3	Krittika	Athi / medi / udumbara	Ficus glomerata / Ficus racemosa	Moraceae
4	Rohini	Neredu / jamun	Eugenia jambolana / Syzygium cuminii	Myrtaceae
5	Mrigashira	Kachu / sandra / chandra/ khair	Acacia catechu	Mimosaceae
6	Aarudra	Tumiki chettu / beedi aaku	Diospyros melanoxylon	Ebenaceae
7	Punarvasu	Golden bamboo / painted bamboo	Bambusa vulgaris 'Vittata'	Poaceae
8	Pushyami	Raavi / aswaddha / pipal / sacred fig	Ficus religiosa	Poaceae
9	Aashlesha	Ponna / laurel wood	Calophyllum inophyllum	Clusiaceae
10	Magha	Marri / vata / banyan tree / Indian fig	Ficus benghalensis	Moraceae
11	Pubba	Moduga / flame of the forest	Butea monosperma	Fabaceae
12	Uttara	a. karaveera / ganneru b. juvvi	a. Nerium indicum b. Ficus virens	a. Apocynaceae b. Moraceae
13	Hasta	a. tella tumma b. adavi mamidi / hog plum c. jaji / sanna jaji	a. Acacia leucophloea b. Spondias pinnata c. Jasminum grandiflorum	a. Mimosaceae b. Anacardiaceae c. Oleaceae
14	Chitra / Chitta	Maredu / beal / bilwa /	Aegle marmelos	Rutaceae
15	Swathi	Tella maddi / arjun	Terminalia arjuna	Combretaceae
16	Visakha	a. velaga / stone apple / wood apple b. naga keshar / cobra saffron	a. Feronia elephantum / Limonia acidissima b. Mesua ferrea	a. Rutaceae b. Caryophyllaceae
17	Anuradha	a. bogada b. naagkeshar / cobra saffron	a. Mimusops elengi b. Mesua ferrea	a. Sapotaceae b. Caryophyllaceae
18	Jyeshtha	a. devadaru b. pine c. barnika d. local devadaru / pagadamu chettu / red cedar	a. Cedrus deodara b. Pinus roxburghii c. Streblus asper d. Erythroxylum monogynum	a. Pinaceae b. Pinaceae c. Moraceae d. Linaceae
19	Moola	a. dhoop / sambrani b. sal / guggilam c. anjan / aepi	a. Boswellia serrata b. Shorea talura / Shorea roxburghii c. Hardwickia binata	a. Burseraceae b. Dipterocarpaceae c. Fabaceae
20	Purvashada	a. jammi / samee b. ashoka	a. Prosopis cineraria / Prosopis spicigera b. Saraca asoca	a. Fabaceae b. Fabaceae
21	Uttarashada	Jack fruit / panasa	Artocarpus heterophyllus	Moraceae
22	Sravanam	Swetarka / tella jilledu	Calotropis procera / Calotropis gigantea	Asclepiadaceae / Apocynaceae
23	Dhanishta	a. munaga / drumstick b. anasandra	a. Moringa oleifera b. Acacia ferruginea	a. Moringaceae b. Fabaceae
24	Satabisha	Kadambam	Anthocephalus cadamba / Neolamarckia cadamba	Rubiaceae
25	Purvabhadra	a. neem / vepa / margosa b. nalla maddi	a. Azadirachta indica b. Terminalia elliptica / Terminalia tomentosa	a. Meliaceae b. Combretaceae
26	Uttarabhadra	a. neem / vepa / margosa b. mango / mamidi	a. Azadirachta indica b. Mangifera indica	a. Meliaceae b. Anacardiaceae
27	Revathi	Ippa / mohua / butter tree	Madhuca longifolia / Madhuca indica	Sapotaceae

=== Raasi vana - garden with plants for 12 zodiac signs ===
This comprises plant species connected with the 12 signs in the zodiac system.

S.no	Name of the raasi / zodiac sign	Common name of the tree	Botanical name	Family
1	Mesha / Aries	Red sandars / rakta chandanam / erra chandanam	Pterocarpus santalinus	Fabaceae
2	Vrishabha / Taurus	Aedakulapala / saptaparni	Alstonia scholaris	Apocynaceae
3	Midhuna / Gemini	a. jack fruit / panasa b. ankudu	a. Artocarpus heterophyllus b. Wrightia tinctoria	a. Moraceae b. Apocynaceae
4	Karkataka / Cancer	Moduga / flame of the forest	Butea monosperma	Fabaceae
5	Simha / Leo	a. padaari / b. Chinese jujube c. regu / Indian jujube	a. Stereospermum colais / Stereospermum tetragonum b. Ziziphus jujuba c. Ziziphus mauritiana	a. Bignoniaceae b. Rhamnaceae c. Rhamnaceae
6	Kanya / Virgo	Mango / mamidi	Mangifera indica	Anacardiaceae
7	Tula / Libra	Bakul / bogada	Mimusops elengi	Sapotaceae
8	Vrishchika / Scorpion	Sandra / chandra / kachu	Acacia catechu	Mimosaceae
9	Dhanus / Sagittarius	Raavi / aswaddha / peepal	Ficus religiosa	Moraceae
10	Makara / Capricorn	Sissoo / north Indian rose wood	Dalbergia sissoo	Fabaceae
11	Kumbha / Aquarius	Jammi / samee	Prosopis cineraria / Prosopis spicigera	Mimosaceae
12	Meena / Pisces	Marri / vata / banyan tree / Indian fig	Ficus benghalensis	Moraceae

=== Saptarishi vana - garden of plants for seven great Indian sages ===
This comprises plant species connected with seven great Indian sages or rishis.

S.no	Name of the rishi / sage	Common name of the tree	Botanical name	Family
1	Vasistha	a. anasandra b. tulasi	a. Acacia ferruginea b. Ocimum sanctum / Ocimum tenuiflorum	a. Mimosaceae b. Lamiaceae
2	Athri	a. avisi b. kaluva	a. Sesbania grandiflora b. Nymphaea nouchali	a. Fabaceae b. Nymphaeaceae
3	Gouthama	a. ummetta b. sanna jaji / star jasmine	a. Datura metel b. Jasminum pubescens / Jasminum multiflorum	a. Solanaceae b. Oleaceae
4	Kashyapa	Tulasi	Ocimum sanctum / Ocimum tenuiflorum	Lamiaceae
5	Bharadwaja	a. uttareni b. poka chekka / betel nut	a. Achyranthes aspera b. Areca catechu	a. Amaranthaceae b. Arecaceae
6	Jamadagni	a. garika b. wild jasmine/adavi malli	a. Cynodon dactylon b. Jasminum angustifolium	a. Poaceae b. Oleaceae
7	Vishwamithra	a. maredu / bilva b. sugandhipala / nannari	a. Aegle marmelos b. Hemidesmus indicus	a. Rutaceae b. Apocynaceae

=== Navagraha vana - garden with plants for nine planets ===
This comprises nine plant species connected with nine planets or celestial bodies.

S.no	Name of the graha / planet	Common name of the tree	Botanical name	Family
1	Budha / Mercury	Uttareni	Achyranthes aspera	Amaranthaceae
2	Sukra / Venus	Athi / medi / udumbara	Ficus glomerata / Ficus racemosa	Moraceae
3	Chandra / Moon	Moduga / flame of the forest	Butea monosperma	Fabaceae
4	Guru / Jupiter	Raavi / aswaddha / pipal / sacred fig	Ficus religiosa	Poaceae
5	Kuja / Mars / Mangala	Kachu / sandra / chandra/ khair	Acacia catechu	Mimosaceae
6	Surya / Sun	Swetarka / tella jilledu	Calotropis procera / Calotropis gigantea	Asclepiadaceae / Apocynaceae
7	Kethu / South Lunar Node	Dharba gaddi	Imperata cylindrica	Poaceae
8	Sani / Saturn	Jammi / samee	Prosopis cineraria / Prosopis spicigera	Fabaceae
9	Rahu / North Lunar Node	Garika	Cynodon dactylon	Poaceae

== Gallery ==
Some notable sacred plant species:

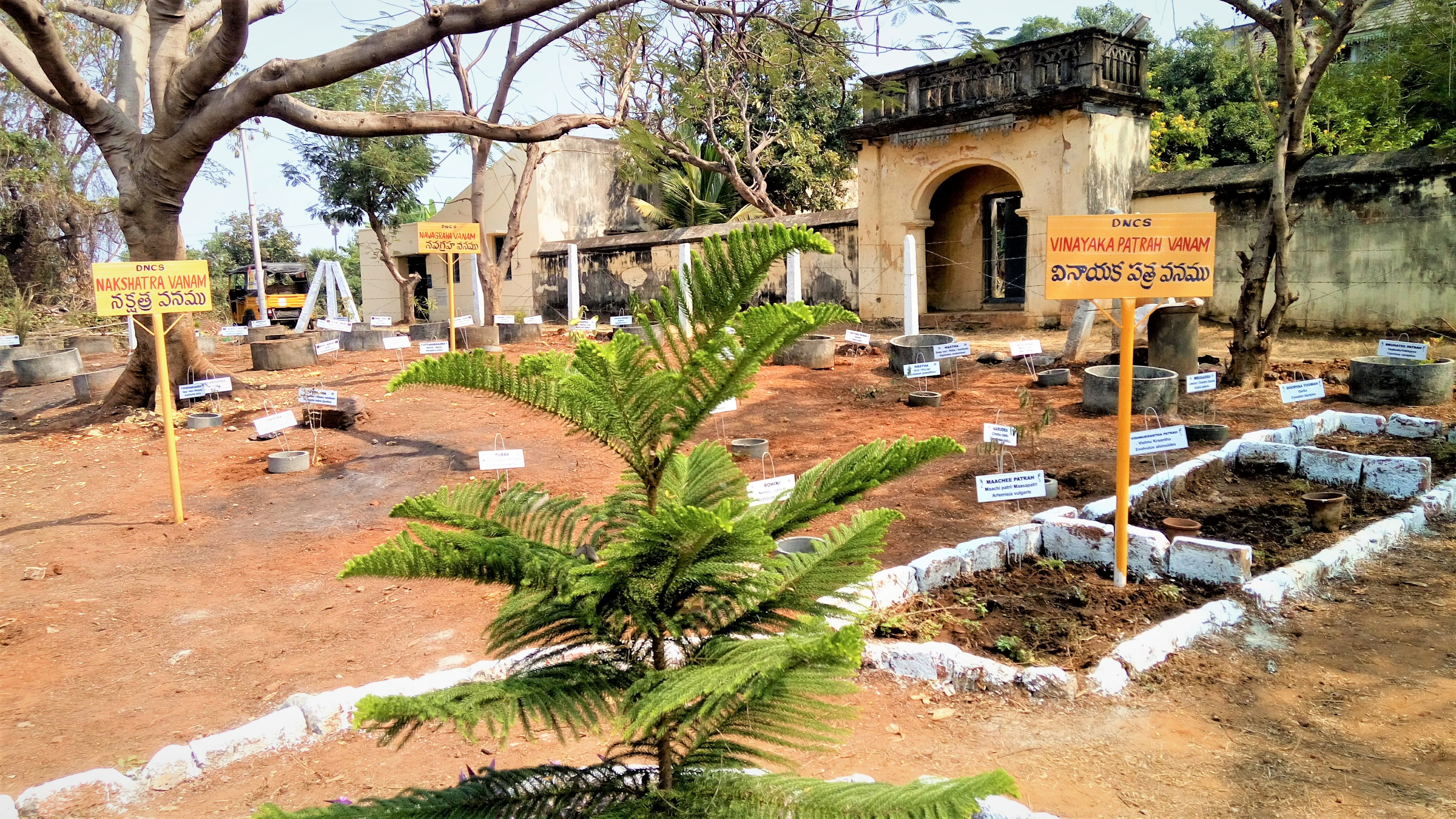
Sacred groves views (1), Biodiversity park, Visakhapatnam

== See also ==
- Biodiversity Park, Visakhapatnam
- Dolphin Nature Conservation Society
