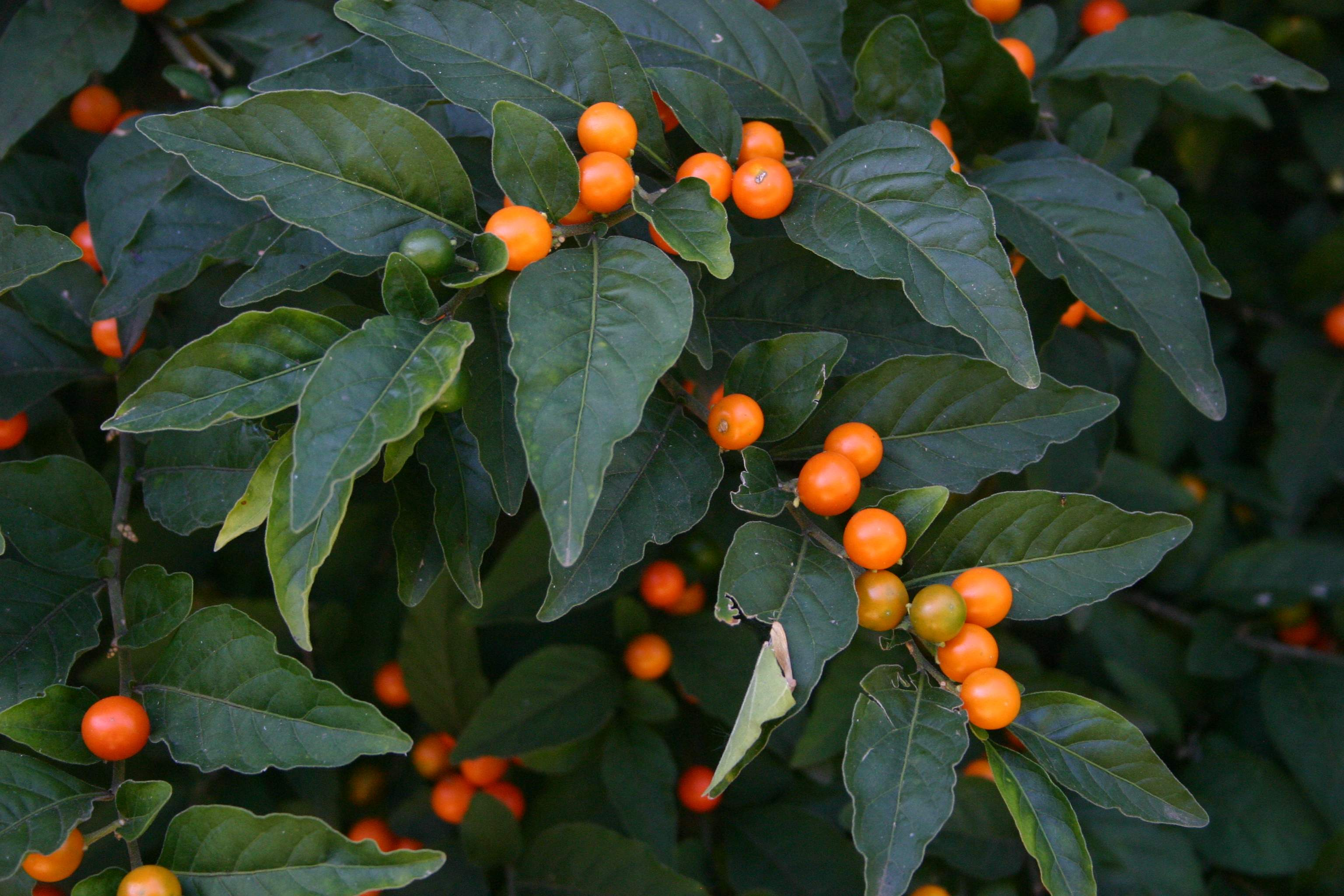
- Fruiting plant

Scientific classification
- Kingdom: Plantae
- Clade: Embryophytes
- Clade: Tracheophytes
- Clade: Angiosperms
- Clade: Eudicots
- Clade: Asterids
- Order: Solanales
- Family: Solanaceae
- Genus: Solanum
- Species: S. pseudocapsicum

Binomial name
- Solanum pseudocapsicum L.

= Solanum pseudocapsicum =

Species of plant

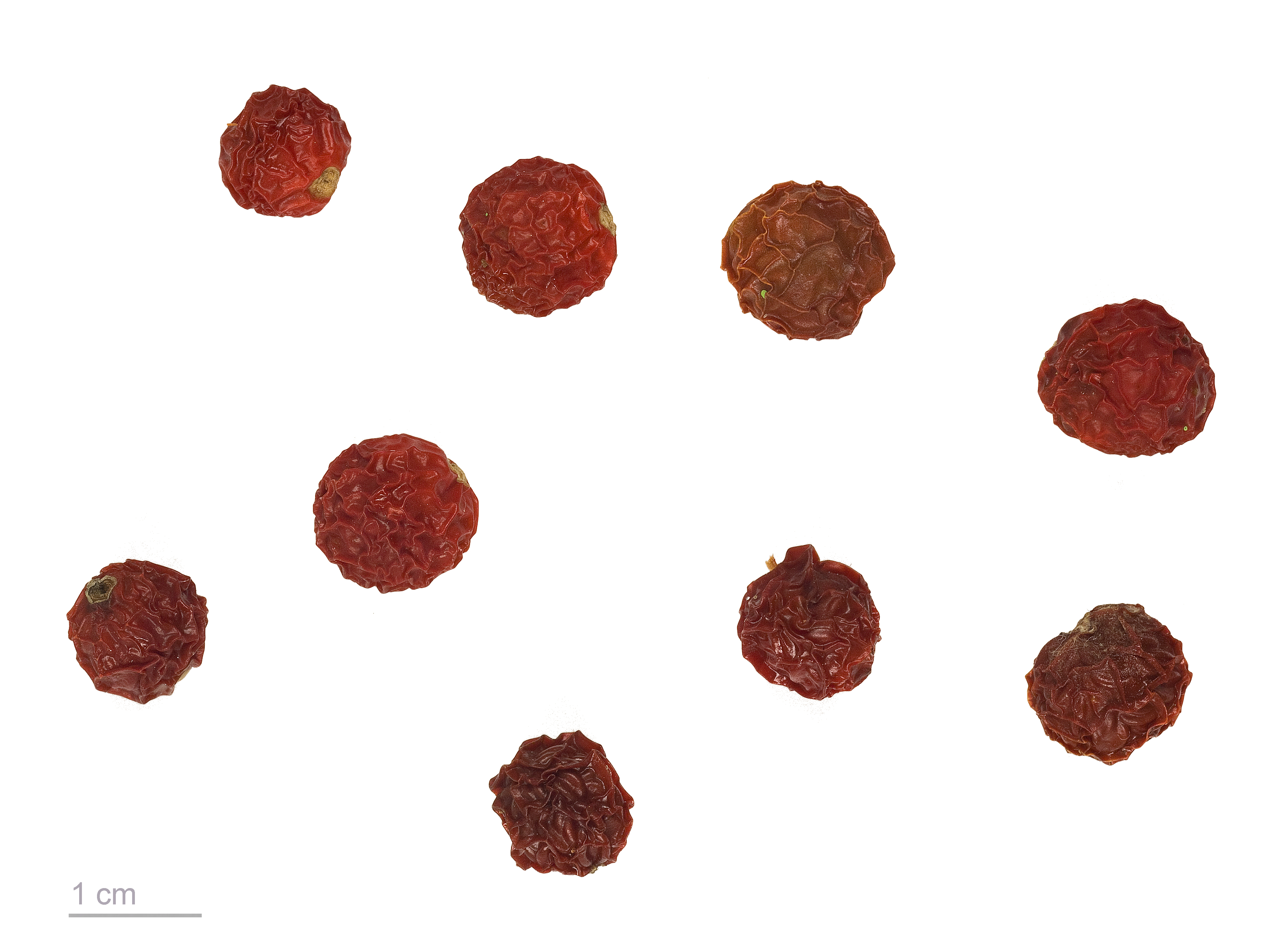
Dried fruits with seeds of Solanum pseudocapsicum

Solanum pseudocapsicum is a nightshade species with mildly poisonous fruit. It is commonly known as the Jerusalem cherry, Madeira winter cherry, xiuhecapatl (in Nahuatl, "windherb"), or ambiguously, "winter cherry". These perennials can be grown decoratively as house plants, but in some areas of South Africa, India, Australia and New Zealand it is regarded as a weed.

== Overview ==
The plant is perennial in zones up to USDA 8. Native to Peru and Ecuador, they can survive frosts and cold weather. They generally live up to 10 years, producing fruit usually in their second or third year, and every year after that. The poisonous fruit is extremely similar to cherry tomatoes in taste and texture, and are therefore easily confused with them.

The Jerusalem cherry's poison is primarily solanocapsine, which is similar to other alkaloids found in their genus, such as solanine. Although the toxin is poisonous, it is generally not life-threatening to humans. It may cause gastric problems, including vomiting and gastroenteritis as referenced in the obsolete scientific name S. ipecacuanha (roughly "ipecac nightshade").

Jerusalem cherries are possibly poisonous to cats and some birds. Though Jerusalem cherry is distributed by certain birds in the wild – both where native and where introduced, e.g., in Australia by the pied currawong (Strepera graculina) – most popular pet birds, namely parrots and relatives, are not immune to its poison.

It is identified in the Libellus de Medicinalibus Indorum Herbis as an ingredient which Aztecs had used for a poultice to cure fever applied to the forehead and neck.

== Taxonomy ==
Supposedly, the plant described as Solanum capsicastrum and called false Jerusalem cherry is a closely related but distinct species, and the trade name "winter cherry" is also held to apply to this exclusively. It is said to be recognizable by more mediocre size, and/or a greyish hue to the foliage and/or stems, and/or fruit that have a pronounced yellow hue when unripe and whose pulp is not or less poisonous (though the seeds still are, making the whole fruit still inedible), and/or higher frost hardiness. But these supposed differences are inconsistently given in various horticultural sources, and no botanical source has in recent times distinguished between the two. Indeed, these taxa are now generally held to refer to the same species, and the "false Jerusalem cherry", if it is at all distinguishable, seems to be a chemotype at best, or just a motley collection of cultivars.

The entire list of now-invalid synonyms of S. pseudocapsicum is long, and many homonyms are included within it:

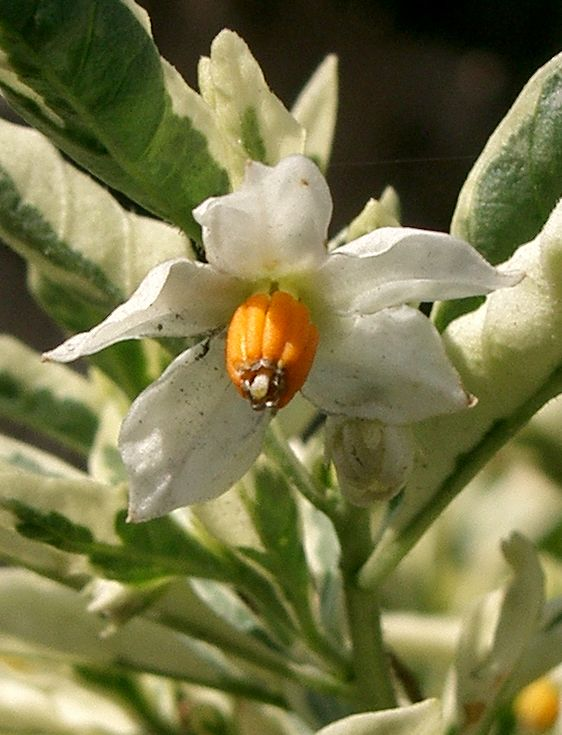
S. pseudocapsicum has large flowers, typically borne singly. The synonym S. singuliflorum and the homonym S. uniflorum refer to this.

- Solanum capsicastrum Link ex Schau
- Solanum capsicastrum var. caaguazuense Chodat
- Solanum compactum Hort.
- Solanum diffusum Link ex Roem. & Schult. (non Ruiz & Pav.: preoccupied)

S. diffusum Roxb. ex Wall. is S. virginianum L..S. diffusum ssp. miozygum Bitter and S. diffusum var. miozygum (Bitter) J.F.Macbr. are S. ternatum.

- Solanum diflorum Vell.
- Solanum diflorum var. angustifolium Kuntze

Not to be confused with S. angustifolium Mill..

- Solanum diflorum var. hygrophilum (Schltdl.) Kuntze
- Solanum diflorum var. pulverulentum Chodat
- Solanum diphyllum Forssk. (non L.: preoccupied)
- Solanum diphyllum var. pulverulentum Chodat

S. diphyllum Sessé & Moc. is S. nudum. S. diphyllum Sw. ex Dunal in DC. is an undeterminable Lycianthes species. S. diphyllum Osbeck is a nomen nudum.

- Solanum dunnianum H.Lév.
- Solanum eremanthum Dunal
- Solanum hendersonii Hort. ex W.Wight
- Solanum hermannioides Schinz
- Solanum hyemale Salisb.
- Solanum hygrophilum Schltdl.
- Solanum ipecacuanha Chodat
- Solanum ipecacuanha var. calvescens Chodat
- Solanum ipecacuanha var. obovata Chodat
- Solanum jaliscanum Greenm.
- Solanum karstenii Dunal

S. karstenii A.Braun & Bouché is S. felinum.

- Solanum linkianum Roem. & Schult.
- Solanum lucidum M.Martens & Galeotti (non Moric.: preoccupied)

S. lucidum Moric. is Aureliana fasciculata (Vell.) Sendtn..

- Solanum mexiae Standl.
- Solanum microcarpum Vahl

S. microcarpum Cerv. ex Lag. is S. pubigerum Dunal. S. microcarpum Pav. ex Dunal in DC. is S. corymbosum Jacq..

- Solanum montevidense Spreng.
- Solanum plurifurcipilum Bitter
- Solanum singuliflorum Steud.
- Solanum tucumanense Griseb.
- Solanum ulmoides Dunal
- Solanum uniflorum Vell. (non Dunal in Poir.: preoccupied)

S. uniflorum Meyen ex Nees is S. elaeagnifolium Cav.. S. uniflorum Dunal in Poir. and S. uniflorum ^{Sessé & Moc.} are Lycianthes mociniana (Dunal) Bitter. S. uniflorum Lag. is an undeterminable Lycianthes species.

- Solanum validum Rusby

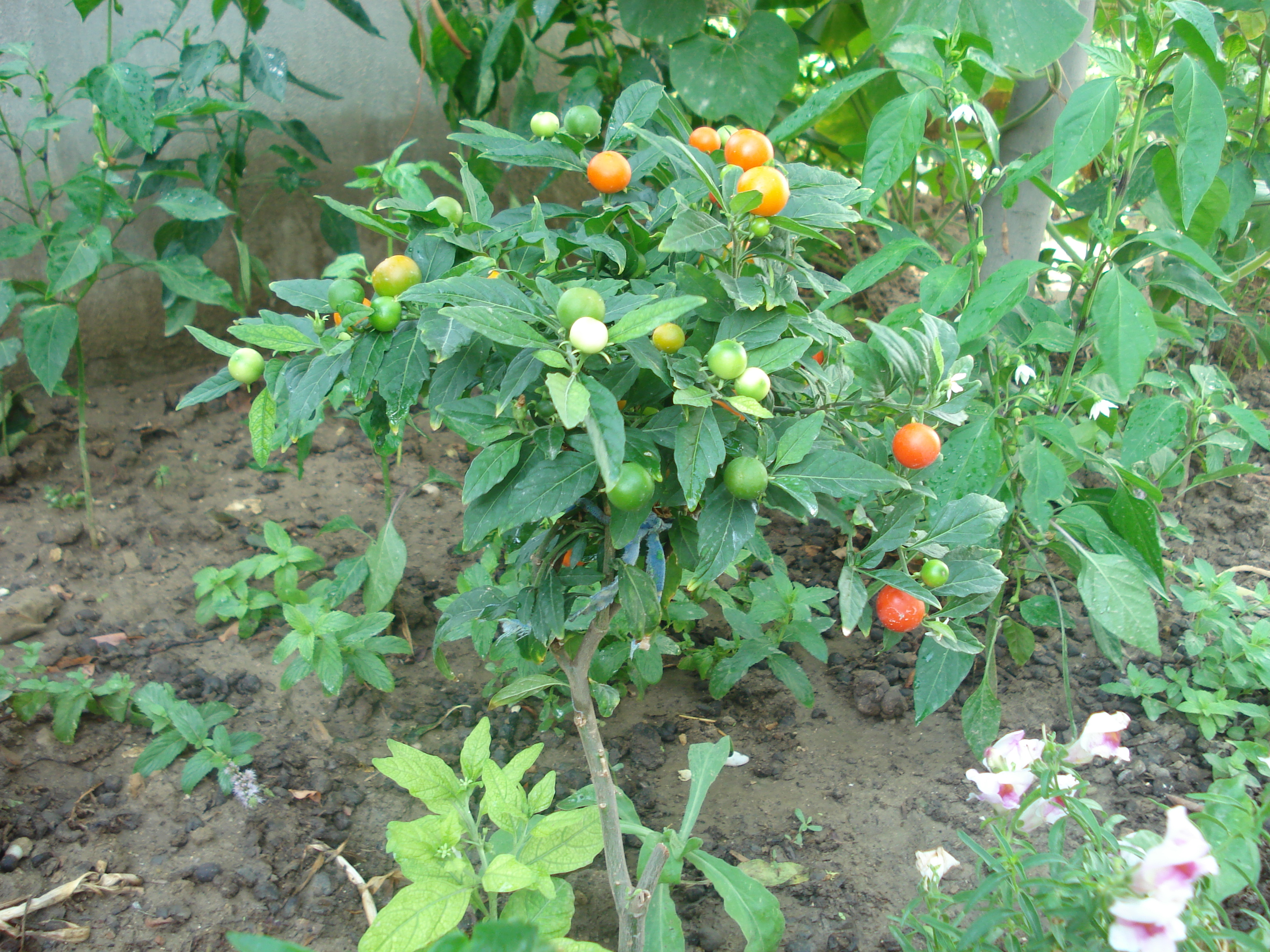
The species' variable habitus has given rise to many supposed varieties.

As can be seen by the "false Jerusalem cherry" case, several presumed forms, subspecies and varieties have been described of S. pseudocapsicum. But these are generally also not considered to be taxonomically distinct today:

- Solanum pseudocapsicum var. ambiguum Hassl.
- Solanum pseudocapsicum f. calvescens (Chodat) Hassl.
- Solanum pseudocapsicum var. diflorum (Vell.) Bitter
- Solanum pseudocapsicum ssp. diflorum (Vell.) Hassl.
- Solanum pseudocapsicum var. hygrophilum (Schltdl.) Hassl.
- Solanum pseudocapsicum var. lancifolium Moench
- Solanum pseudocapsicum f. microcarpum (Vahl) Hassl.
- Solanum pseudocapsicum var. microcarpum Pers.
- Solanum pseudocapsicum var. normale Kuntze
- Solanum pseudocapsicum f. pilosulum Hassl.
- Solanum pseudocapsicum f.? pilosum Kuntze
- Solanum pseudocapsicum f. pilulosum Hassl.
- Solanum pseudocapsicum var. parvifolium Kuntze

Not to be confused with S. parvifolium.

- Solanum pseudocapsicum var. sendtnerianum Hassl.

Not to be confused with S. sendtnerianum.

- Solanum pseudocapsicum "Thurino" RHS (tentative).
- Solanum pseudocapsicum var. typicum Hassl.

== References in popular culture ==
A Jerusalem cherry plant is given as a Christmas gift in Lucy Maud Montgomery's 1935 novel Mistress Pat. It is believed to be a symbol of bad luck, a notion that is apparently confirmed when the Gardiner family's Christmas celebrations go haywire.

The Jerusalem cherry is a plot point in the TV series Into the Dark episode "Pilgrim", in which cannibalistic pilgrims are poisoned with a pie made of Jerusalem cherries, allowing the main characters to momentarily escape.

Alicia Silverstone, an actress best known for starring in the movie Clueless, posted a TikTok of herself eating an unknown, cherry-tomato-like fruit off the street in England in August 2024; fans identified this as a Jerusalem cherry, prompting concerns for her health and spawning many memes.

== See also ==
- Solanum diphyllum
- List of Jerusalem cherry diseases
