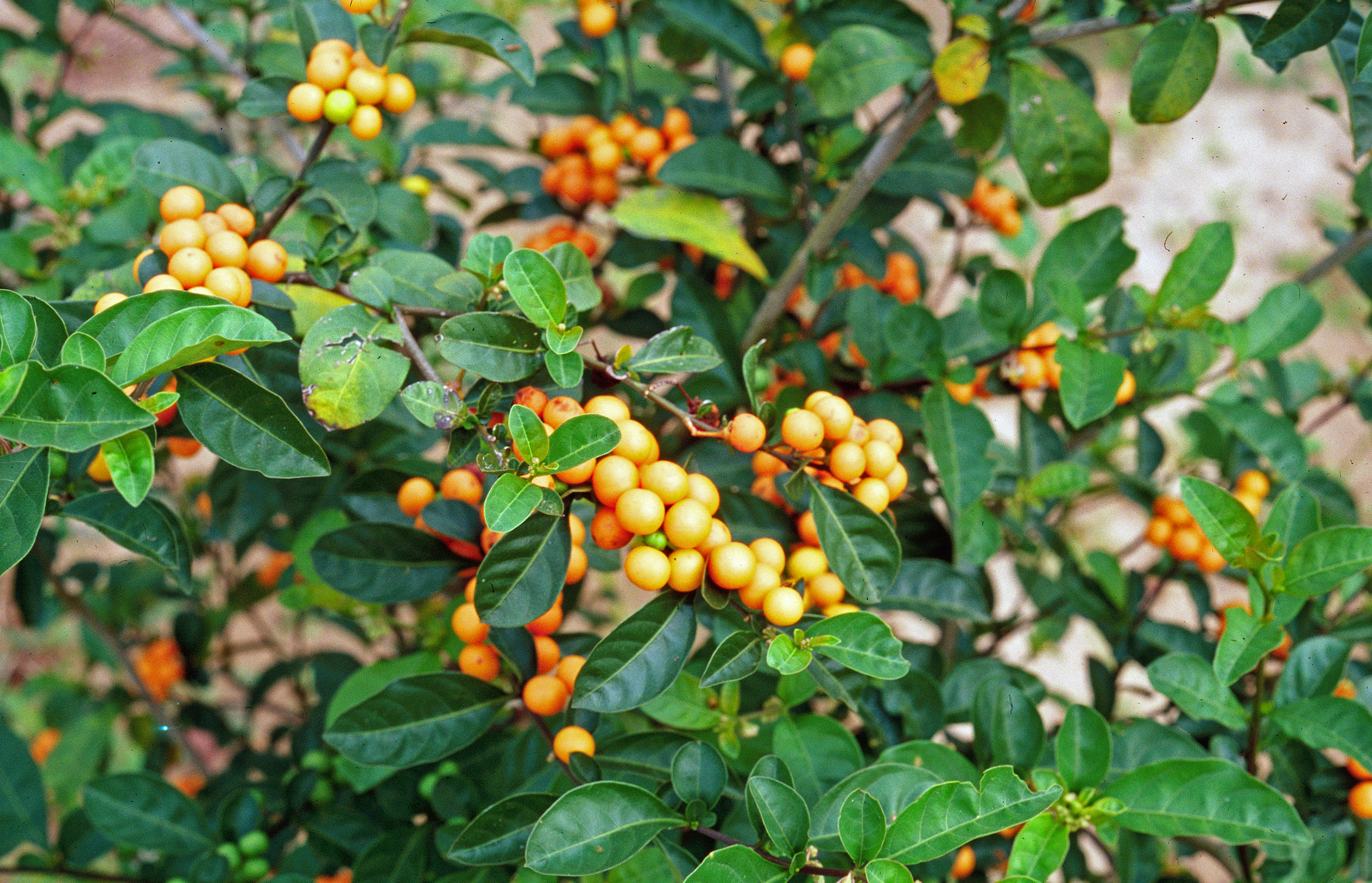

Scientific classification
- Kingdom: Plantae
- Clade: Tracheophytes
- Clade: Angiosperms
- Clade: Eudicots
- Clade: Asterids
- Order: Solanales
- Family: Solanaceae
- Genus: Solanum
- Species: S. diphyllum

Binomial name
- Solanum diphyllum L.
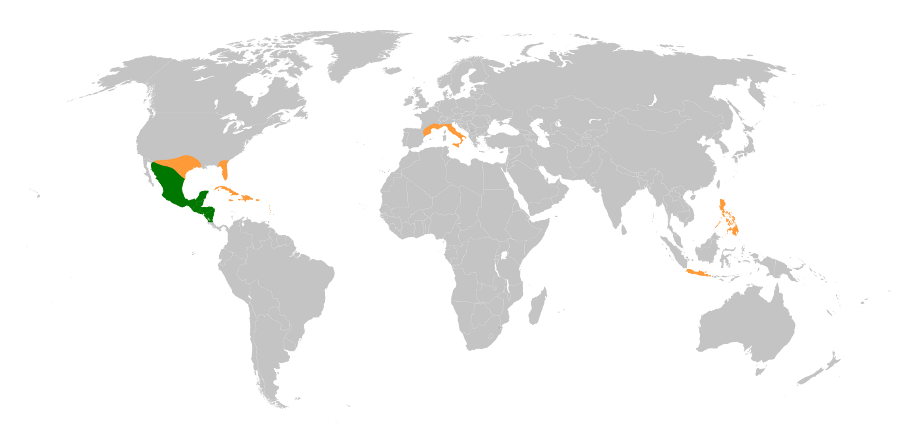
- Distribution of S. diphyllum. Native range is in green. Areas under which it had been naturalized or are widely cultivated are in orange.

= Solanum diphyllum =

Twoleaf nightshade

Species of flowering plant

Solanum diphyllum, commonly known as the twoleaf nightshade, is a species of nightshade native to the Americas. It is cultivated as an ornamental plant for its clusters of dark green round fruits that turn a bright yellow when ripe.

== Taxonomy ==
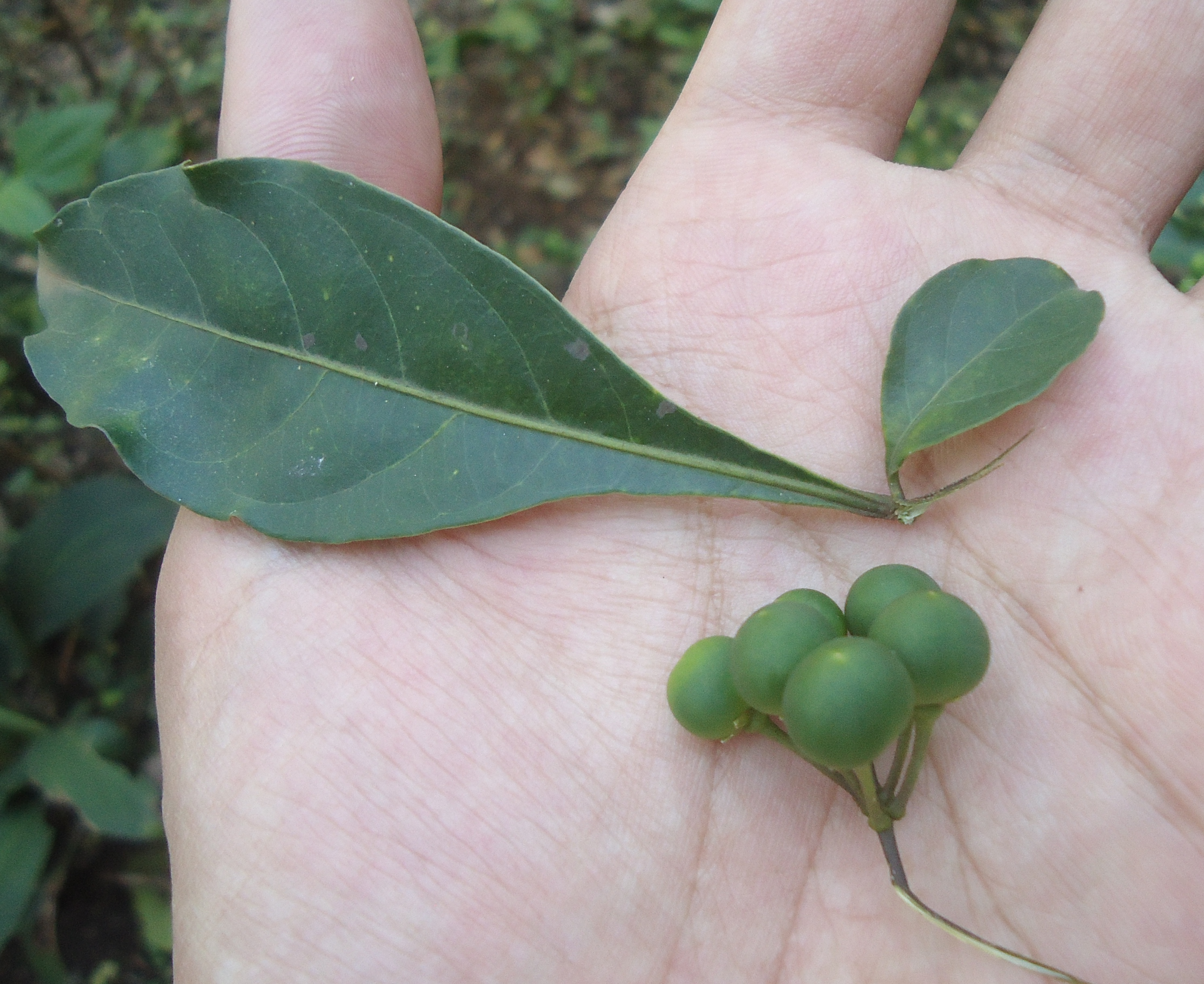
Unripe berries and a leaf pair (major and minor leaf) relative to a human hand.

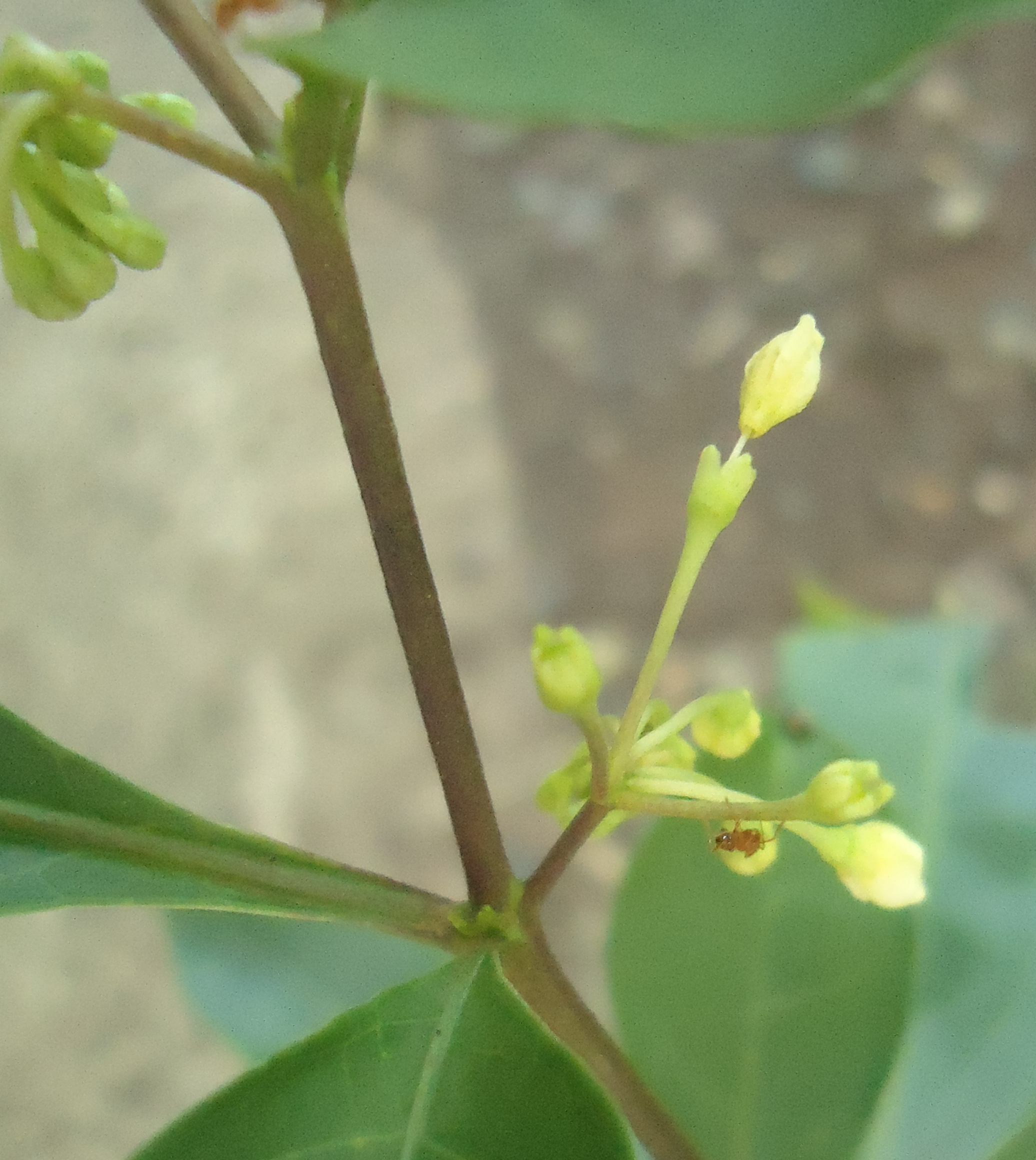
The inflorescence and fruits of twoleaf nightshades are borne opposite of the leaf pairs.

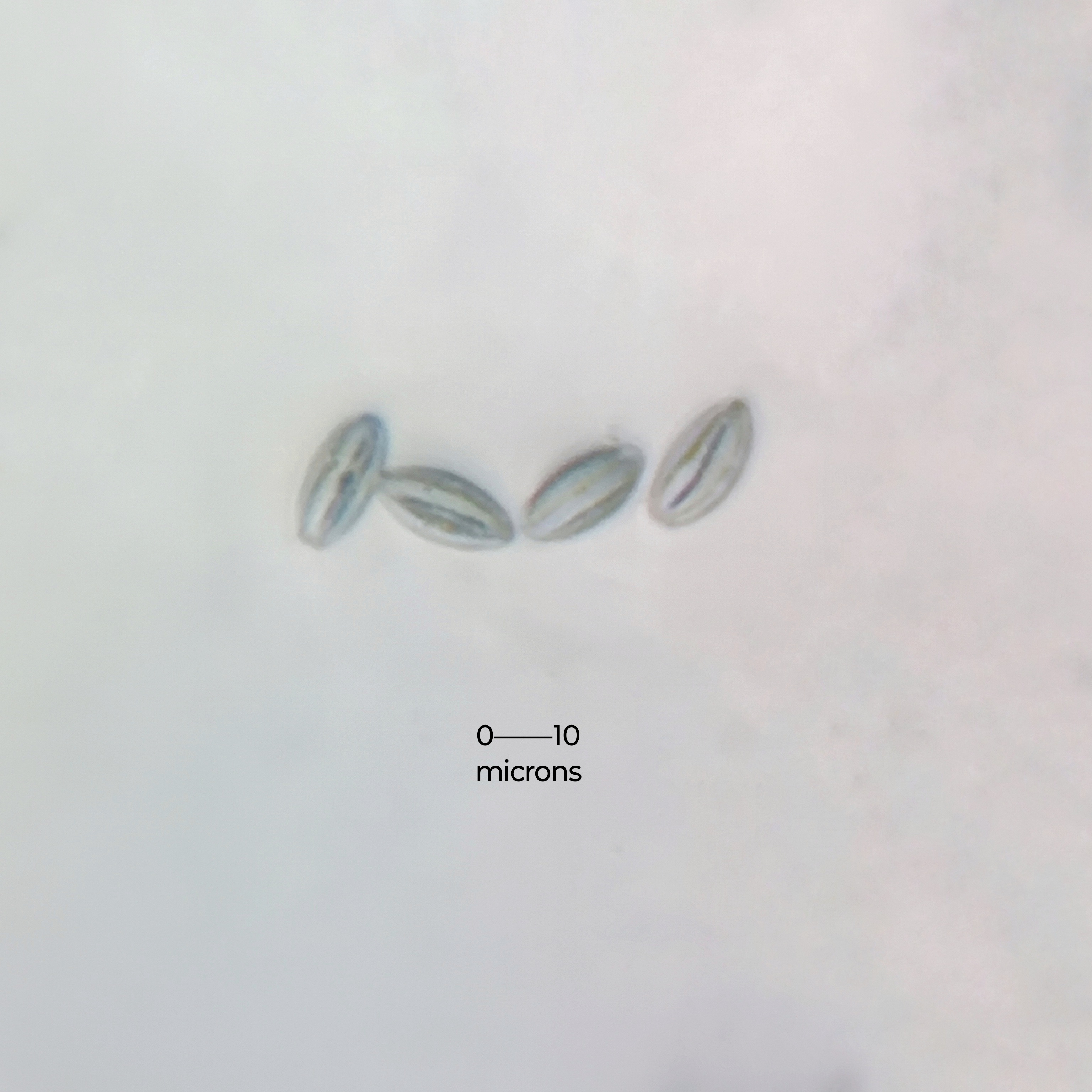
Pollen grains of Solanum diphyllum

Twoleaf nightshade is classified under the subgenus Minon. It belongs to the tribe Solaneae, subfamily Solanoideae, under the very large and diverse nightshade family (Solanaceae). It was first described by Carl Linnaeus in his 1753 book Species Plantarum.

The forest nightshade (Solanum nudum), another species altogether, was originally illegitimately named Solanum diphyllum by the Spanish botanists Martín Sessé y Lacasta and José Mariano Mociño in 1894, despite the name already being used.

Twoleaf nightshade may sometimes be confused with the Jerusalem cherry (Solanum pseudocapsicum), another nightshade grown for its brightly colored berries, and referred to by various synonyms, some of which were once classified as its cultivars. Within the genus, it most closely resembles a rare species in western Mexico, Solanum malacothrix.

Twoleaf nightshade is also known as twinleaf nightshade, twin-leaved nightshade, two-leaf nightshade, and other variations of the name. The specific epithet 'diphyllum' means "two leaf", referring to the arrangement of its leaves. It is sometimes called by other names such as tomatillo (not to be confused with the edible Physalis philadelphica), amatillo, and 黄果龙葵 (Huang guo long kui).

== Description ==
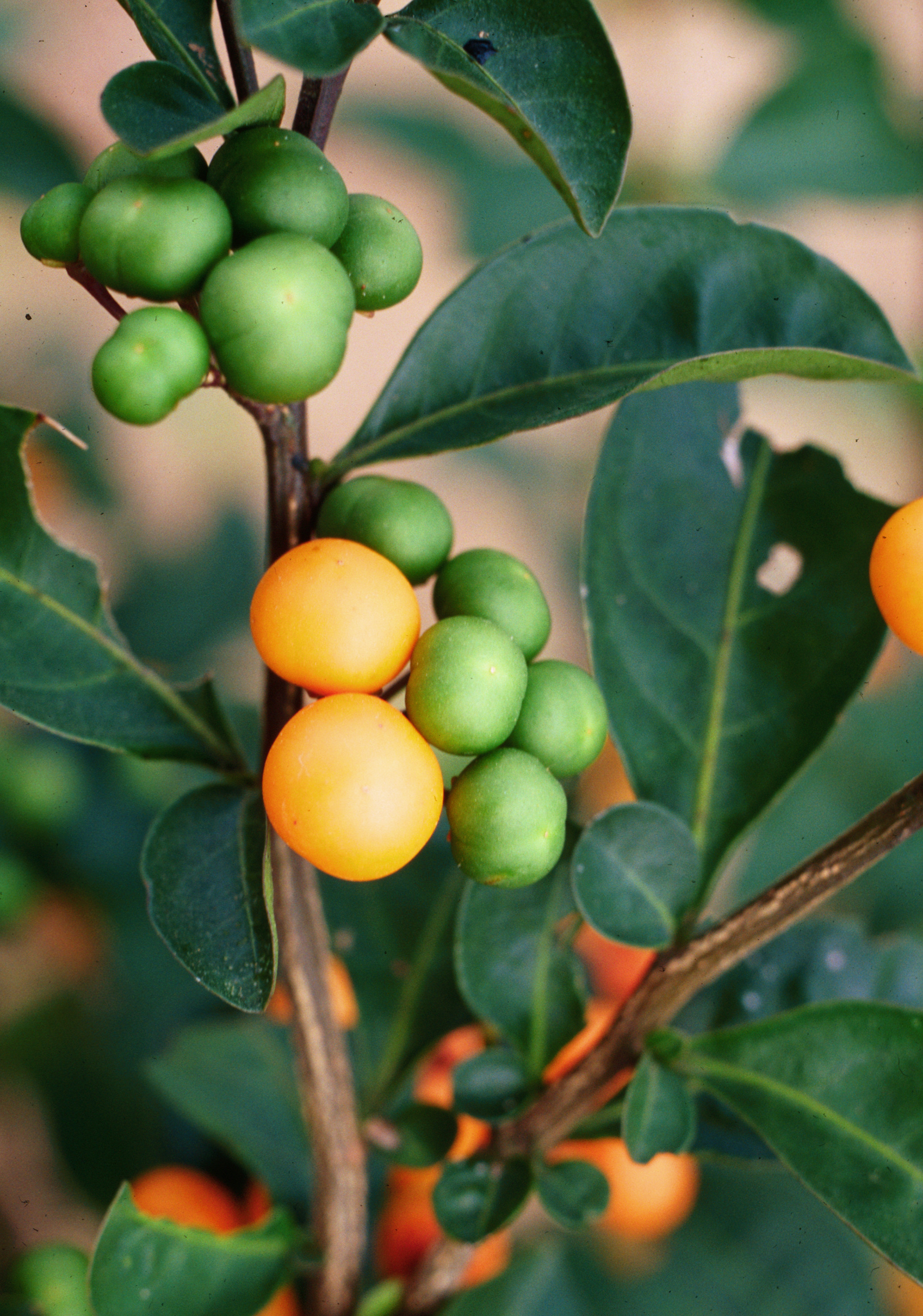
Ripe and unripe berries of twoleaf nightshades.

Twoleaf nightshade grows as a small shrub about 1 to 2 m (3.3 to 6.6 ft) tall. The stems are smooth or sometimes slightly downy with a dark brown bark.

A distinctive feature of twoleaf nightshade is that its leaves grow in pairs from a single bud, hence the name 'twoleaf'. Each pair is composed of a major and a minor leaf. Major leaves average around 6 cm (2.4 in) long by 2 cm (0.79 in) wide and are elliptic to oblong in shape. Minor leaves are smaller and more rounded; they are 2 cm (0.79 in) long by 1 cm (0.39 in) wide on average. The leaves are a glossy dark green on the upper surface with a lighter green on the ventral side. The petioles are about 2 mm (0.079 in) in length.

The inflorescences are borne opposite the leaves. Each bears about 5 to 20 closely spaced flowers. The flower buds are white and globular when young but become more lavender in color and elongated as they mature. They bloom into tiny white flowers with a lavender tinge about 1 cm (0.39 in) across.

The fruits are spherical berries with a slight division around the middle, especially when unripe. They are green and hard when young, around 1 cm (0.39 in) in diameter. They mature into bright yellow to orange fleshy and juicy berries about 1.2 cm (0.47 in) in diameter. They are mounted on the flower calyces on long and thin pedicels. Each berry contains numerous seeds.

The seeds are flattened and kidney-shaped (resembling bell pepper seeds), each about 3 mm (0.12 in) long and 2.5 mm (0.098 in) wide. They have pale margins and are minutely pitted.

== Distribution and habitat ==
Twoleaf nightshade is native to Northern and Central America in Mexico, Belize, Costa Rica, El Salvador, Guatemala, Honduras, and Nicaragua. It is widely cultivated as an ornamental plant in subtropical and tropical parts of the world like Southern France, Italy, and Taiwan. It has escaped cultivation in some areas and become naturalized in Florida and Texas, United States; Java, Indonesia; the Philippines; and the West Indies.

Twoleaf nightshade is a ruderal species, colonizing newly disturbed lands. It also grows in mangrove forests.

== Ecology and cultivation ==
Twoleaf nightshade is grown for its attractive clusters of green and yellow berries. The plants are spread very easily. Fruits are eaten by birds and bats, both of which help disperse the seeds. The seeds are especially hardy, able to survive being buried in an inch of soil for up to two years. Seventy five to eighty five percent of the seeds will sprout.

The plant is poisonous to humans.

Methods of controlling it in areas where it is unwanted mostly involve being familiar with its growing habits and appearance and uprooting the plants before they bear fruits.

== Phylogeny ==
Twoleaf nightshade belongs to the Geminata clade, section Holophylla, along with Solanum pseudocapsicum and Solanum pseudoquina.

== See also ==
- List of Solanum species
