= Solanum ternatum =

Scientific classification
- Kingdom: Plantae
- Clade: Tracheophytes
- Clade: Angiosperms
- Clade: Eudicots
- Clade: Asterids
- Order: Solanales
- Family: Solanaceae
- Genus: Solanum
- Species: S. ternatum

Binomial name
- Solanum ternatum Ruiz & Pav.

Synonyms
- See text

Species of flowering plant

Solanum ternatum is a species of flowering plant in the family Solanaceae. Its natural habitat is subtropical or tropical moist montane forests.

Solanum ternifolium as described by Erich Werdermann is an invalid name for this plant that is sometimes still seen. Altogether, the following synonyms are assigned to this species:

- Solanum dendrophilum Bitter
- Solanum diffusum Ruiz & Pav.

S. diffusum Roxb. ex Wall. is S. virginianum L.. S. diffusum Link ex Roem. & Schult. is S. pseudocapsicum.

- Solanum diffusum var. miozygum (Bitter) J.F.Macbr.
- Solanum diffusum ssp. miozygum Bitter
- Solanum feddei Bitter
- Solanum moritzianum Bitter
- Solanum semievectum Bitter
- Solanum semiscandens Bitter
- Solanum subquinatum Bitter
- Solanum ternifolium Werderm.

The mysterious S. ternifolium was classified as Data Deficient endemic of Ecuador by the IUCN, before it was synonymized with the widespread S. ternatum.

== Footnotes ==
- Montúfar, R.; Pitman, N. (2004). "Solanum ternifolium". IUCN Red List of Threatened Species. 2004 e.T46201A11040038. doi:10.2305/IUCN.UK.2004.RLTS.T46201A11040038.en.
- Solanaceae Source (2004): Solanum ternatum. Version of December 2004. Retrieved 2008-SEP-30.
