= Stereospermum neuranthum =

Conservation status
- Least Concern (IUCN 3.1)

Scientific classification
- Kingdom: Plantae
- Clade: Tracheophytes
- Clade: Angiosperms
- Clade: Eudicots
- Clade: Asterids
- Order: Lamiales
- Family: Bignoniaceae
- Genus: Stereospermum
- Species: S. neuranthum

Binomial name
- Stereospermum neuranthum Kurz

Synonyms
- Radermachera wallichii (C.B.Clarke) Chatterjee; Stereospermum grandiflorum Cubitt & W.W.Sm.; Stereospermum wallichii C.B.Clarke

Species of tree

Stereospermum neuranthum is the accepted name of an Asian tree species in the family Bignoniaceae. It is found in sub-tropical and tropical seasonal forests up to 1600 m in: southern China, northeast India, Myanmar, Thailand, Cambodia, Laos and Vietnam. Names include quao núi (also: ké núi, quao núi quả bốn cạnh) in Viet Nam; in China it is called 毛叶羽叶楸 mao ye yu ye qiu.
