= Stereospermum cylindricum =

Scientific classification
- Kingdom: Plantae
- Clade: Tracheophytes
- Clade: Angiosperms
- Clade: Eudicots
- Clade: Asterids
- Order: Lamiales
- Family: Bignoniaceae
- Genus: Stereospermum
- Species: S. cylindricum

Binomial name
- Stereospermum cylindricum Pierre ex Dop, 1930

Species of tree

Stereospermum cylindricum is a tree species in the family Bignoniaceae. In Viet Nam it is called Quao vàng.
