= Solanocapsine =

Names
- IUPAC name 3β-Amino-16,23-epoxy-16α,28-seco-5α-solanidan-23β-ol
- Systematic IUPAC name (2S,4aS,3bS,6aS,6bR,7S,7aR,10R,11aS,12aR,13aS,13bR,15aS)-2-Amino-4a,6a,7,10-tetramethyldocosahydronaphtho[2′′,1′′:4′,5′]indeno[1′,2′:5,6]pyrano[3,2-b]pyridin-11a(1H)-ol
- Other names 3β-Amino-22,26-epimino-16α,23-epoxy-5α,22αH,25βH-cholestan-23β-ol; (3β,5α,16α,22α,23β,25β)-3-Amino-16,23-epoxy-16,28-secosolanidan-23-ol

Identifiers
CAS Number	639-86-1
3D model (JSmol)	Interactive image
ChemSpider	66133
PubChem CID	73419
UNII	WWQ51S32N8
CompTox Dashboard (EPA)	DTXSID00980818
- InChI: InChI=1S/C27H46N2O2/c1-15-13-27(30)24(29-14-15)16(2)23-22(31-27)12-21-19-6-5-17-11-18(28)7-9-25(17,3)20(19)8-10-26(21,23)4/h15-24,29-30H,5-14,28H2,1-4H3/t15-,16+,17+,18+,19-,20+,21+,22-,23+,24-,25+,26+,27+/m1/s1 Key: ZPTJKUUQUDRHTL-QAQRTNARSA-N; InChI=1/C27H46N2O2/c1-15-13-27(30)24(29-14-15)16(2)23-22(31-27)12-21-19-6-5-17-11-18(28)7-9-25(17,3)20(19)8-10-26(21,23)4/h15-24,29-30H,5-14,28H2,1-4H3/t15-,16+,17+,18+,19-,20+,21+,22-,23+,24-,25+,26+,27+/m1/s1 Key: ZPTJKUUQUDRHTL-QAQRTNARBX
- SMILES: C[C@@H]1C[C@]2([C@@H]([C@H]([C@H]3[C@H](O2)C[C@@H]4[C@@]3(CC[C@H]5[C@H]4CC[C@@H]6[C@@]5(CC[C@@H](C6)N)C)C)C)NC1)O

Properties
Chemical formula	C_{27}H_{46}N_{2}O_{2}
Molar mass	430.677 g·mol^{−1}
Appearance	Long flat colorless prisms (ethanol-H_{2}O)
Melting point	222 °C (432 °F; 495 K) 216-217 °C
- Except where otherwise noted, data are given for materials in their standard state (at 25 °C [77 °F], 100 kPa). verify (what is ?) Infobox references

Solanocapsine is a toxic steroidal alkaloid from Jerusalem cherry (Solanum pseudocapsicum).
