= Dolphin Nature Conservation Society =

NGO Andhra Pradesh, India

Dolphin Nature Conservation Society (DNCS), Visakhapatnam
- Interactive map of Dolphin Nature Conservation Society (DNCS), Visakhapatnam
- Type: NGO for nature conservation / environmental protection / education / awareness
- Location: HB Colony, Visakhapatnam, Andhra Pradesh, India
- Coordinates: 17.745048°N 83.324062°E

The Dolphin Nature Conservation Society (DNCS) is a registered (no. 507/2001) voluntary environmental non-profit and non-governmental organization (NGO) located in Visakhapatnam, Andhra Pradesh, India. It is committed to the causes of nature conservation, environmental protection, research, education, and awareness. The society was founded on March 5, 2001, by Dr. Mantha Rama Murty and Dr. Mangathayi, who had previously launched several nature conservation programs in Andhra Pradesh, particularly in Visakhapatnam. The organization's activities are intended to instill a love for nature and conservation among people, especially among the younger generation. Notable research, documentation, conservation, and awareness campaigns of the society have involved Olive-Ridley Sea Turtles, intertidal rocky shore fauna and flora of the Visakhapatnam coast, and butterflies of the Eastern Ghats. The society's flagship project is the development and maintenance of the Biodiversity Park in Visakhapatnam.

== Precursor: Penguin Nature Club (WWF-India) ==
In 1987, an environmental organization known as the Penguin Nature Club was formed at the BVK College (part of Andhra University, Visakhapatnam) in affiliation with WWF-India. The organization engaged in nature conservation and environmental protection activities for more than a decade. Seeking to expand its activities, the organization was renamed the Dolphin Nature Conservation Society in 2001 and allowed public and student membership.

== Notable initiatives and programs ==
=== Awareness campaigns ===
Society has conducted various educational nature conservation and environmental protection activities and campaigns. One notable example was a campaign dedicated to dispelling myths and misconceptions about snakes. It was emphasized that the majority of snakes are non-venomous and play an important role in the ecosystem by controlling the rodent population. In collaboration with the Friends of Snakes Society, Hyderabad, the society conducted live snake awareness programs in schools and colleges in Visakhapatnam. Other notable activities include campaigns against the use of thin plastic carry bags, zoo patrolling teams aimed at educating visitors about proper zoo visitation protocol, wildlife conservation projects, tree planting projects, and "save our beaches" anti-pollution campaigns.

=== Survey and research programs ===
==== The Olive Ridley Sea Turtle ====
Olive Ridley Sea Turtles are best known for their migrations and unique mass nesting occurrences called "arribada" when thousands of females converge on the same beach to lay eggs. The turtle population has been declining over time; the species has been deemed vulnerable by the IUCN Red List.

On the northeast coast of Andhra Pradesh (from Annavaram in the north to Pudimadaka in the south) and the Visakhapatnam coast, in particular, the society used surveying and documentation programs to research on the species. This research found that sporadic nesting occurs from January to March and that the mortality rate for females had increased over time. The major cause was the incidental capture of adult turtles in gill and trawl fishing nets operated by mechanized boats. Other reasons included artificial illumination along the coastline, sand mining, pollution by domestic sewage, chemicals, oil, plastics, and building debris, and the planting of exotic flora on the beaches. Human predation of eggs and meat, as well as the predation of hatchlings by crows, kites, seagulls, and feral dogs, were also contributing factors.

In an attempt to stop population decline, important conservation measures have been developed, including strict enforcement of bans on near-shore mechanized fishing and operation of gill nets, shore-seine and lines during breeding and nesting seasons, the use of turtle excluder devices (TED) in trawl nets, beach patrols, cessation of beachside construction and development activities, the promotion of in-situ conservation, the establishment of more hatcheries, and the creation of awareness programs targeted at fishermen, forest officials, students, NGOs, and the general public. The most important programs in the Olive Ridley Sea Turtle Conservation project were the many public awareness events; turtle walks, screening pictures, exhibitions in schools and colleges, and celebratory festivals for turtles were effective at increasing public concern for the turtles.

==== Intertidal rocky shore fauna and flora ====
The intertidal (littoral) zone is the area between high and low tide lines. The intertidal zone of Visakhapatnam is 70 meters long, with an average width of 25 meters. It is mostly made up of rocky shore interspersed by sandy areas and extends from Gangavaram to Bheemunipatnam, a distance of approximately 25 to 30 kilometers. The zone has large boulders of various shapes, shingle beds, rock platforms, and rock pools. In addition, it has a very rich diversity of organisms, from the smallest microscopic protozoans to sponges, cnidarians, polychaetes, arthropods, Mollusca, echinoderms, rock pool fish, and numerous varieties of algae. These highly peculiar and highly adaptable faunas and flora face environmental hardships such as water availability, temperature and salinity differences, and pressures from prey and predators.

The society conducted research and survey programs that documented the fauna and flora of the Visakhapatnam coast. Throughout 10 years, the society observed a decline in marine biota, specifically in sea cucumbers, chitons, sea urchins, and Bullia and Zoanthus beds. The main reasons for this decline are human interference, including the illegal collection of specimens by colleges and universities and pollution of waters. The society recommends conservation methods including stopping pollution from all sources along the coast, preventing the illegal collection of specimens, declaring some areas as protective zones, and raising awareness among students and people by conducting marine biodiversity workshops and exhibitions.

==== Butterflies of the Eastern Ghats ====
More than 100 species of butterflies belonging to six families were recorded by the society in the Eastern Ghats forests (Chintapalle, G K Veedhi, Ananthagiri, Paderu, Araku Valley, Sileru), and urban environments (Thotala Konda, Kambala Konda, Simhachalam Hills, Indira Gandhi Zoological Park, and RCD Biodiversity Park) of the Visakhapatnam district. The families included Papilionidae (swallowtails), Pieridae (whites and yellows), Nymphalidae (brush-footed butterflies), Lycaenidae, Riodinidae (metalmarks/Punches and Judies), and Hesperiidae (skippers).

== Biodiversity Park, Visakhapatnam ==
The Biodiversity Park, Visakhapatnam is an educational botanical garden run by the society. It contains more than 2000 species of plants and hundreds of butterfly and bird species. Hundreds of students and researchers visit the park daily for education and research purposes.

== Awards ==
- Andhra Pradesh Green Awards 2017 - APUG & BC 13–7–2018.
- Andhra Pradesh Biodiversity Conserver Award - 2018 APSBDB 22–5–2018.
- Rolling Shield (State Level) for Environmental Protection by the Directorate of Field Publicity, Ministry of Information & Broadcasting, Govt. of India, Hyderabad.
- Best nature club of the Millenium-2000 by WWF-India, Hyderabad state office.
- Best Environmental Society award in 2001 by Krushi Orthopaedic Society, Visakhapatnam, AP.

== See also ==
- Biodiversity Park, Visakhapatnam
- Sacred groves of Biodiversity Park, Visakhapatnam
