= Winter cherry =

Winter cherry may refer to:

== Solanaceae (nightshade plants) ==
- Physalis alkekengi (Chinese lantern)
- other species of Physalis
- Solanum pseudocapsicum (Jerusalem cherry), especially under its synonym S. capsicastrum (false Jerusalem cherry)
- Withania somnifera (ashwaganda)

== Other uses ==
- Winter Cherry, a 1985 Soviet film
- Winter Cherry complex, a shopping mall in Kemerovo, Russia; the site of the 2018 Kemerovo fire
