= Parul =

Five-petaled flower

Parul is a five-petaled flower known for its beauty. It is also a unisex name of Hindu origin. The name also appears in the Bengali folk tale Saat Bhai Champa, which is also known as "Seven Champa Brothers and One Sister Parul". In the tale, a king has seven sons and one daughter. Towards the end of the story the children turn into flowers. The daughter was the flower "Parul". The story and the flower Parul also feature in Rabindranath Tagore's Rabindra sangeet.

Parul means graceful. The linguistic origins of the name are uncertain— some claim it is Sanskrit, while it is actually not. More typically it is assumed to be of Bengali origin.

== See also ==
- Stereospermum chelonoides
