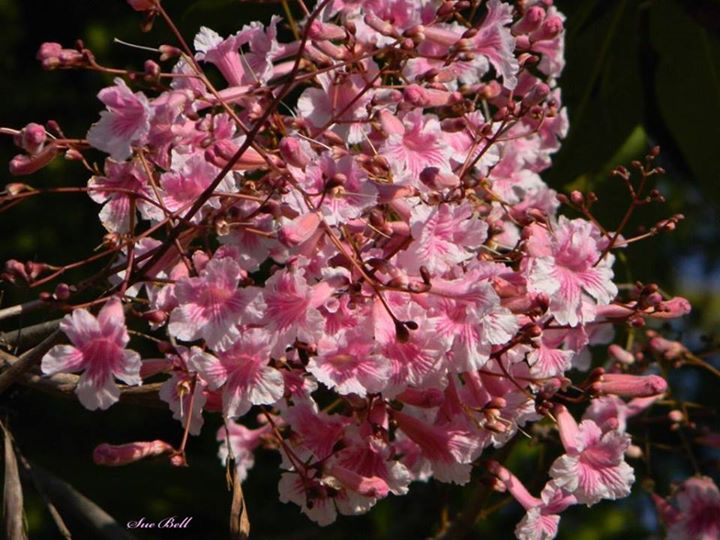

Scientific classification
- Kingdom: Plantae
- Clade: Tracheophytes
- Clade: Angiosperms
- Clade: Eudicots
- Clade: Asterids
- Order: Lamiales
- Family: Bignoniaceae
- Genus: Stereospermum
- Species: S. kunthianum

Binomial name
- Stereospermum kunthianum Cham.

Synonyms
- Bignonia lanata R.Br. ex Fresen.; Dolichandrone smithii Baker; Stereospermum arguezona A.Rich.; Stereospermum arnoldianum De Wild.; Stereospermum cinereoviride K.Schum.; Stereospermum dentatum A.Rich.; Stereospermum integrifolium A.Rich.; Stereospermum kunthianum var. dentatum (A.Rich.) Fiori

= Stereospermum kunthianum =

Species of shrub

Stereospermum kunthianum is an African deciduous shrub or small tree occurring in the Democratic Republic of Congo, Djibouti, Eritrea, Ethiopia, Kenya, Malawi, Senegal, Somalia, Sudan, Tanzania and Uganda. It is widespread across Africa to the Red Sea, and reaches as far south as Angola, Mozambique, Zambia and Zimbabwe. There are some 30 species with a Central African and Asian distribution.

Growing to 25 cm diameter, it has thin, grey-black bark, smooth or flaking in patches resembling the London plane; the trunk is rarely straight, with twisted branches. Usually 5m tall, but occasionally up to 15m, with abundant, fragrant, precocious, pink or purplish flowers, making the tree a spectacular sight. The alternate leaves are imparipinnately compound and some 25 cm long; leaflets are nearly opposite with one terminal leaflet, and with short, soft hairs, oblong to oblong-elliptic in shape, green and hairless above, yellowish-green with prominent venation below, apex somewhat attenuate, and the base tapering. The leaf margin may be entire or sometimes toothed in coppice shoots, while petiolules are virtually absent. Petioles may be up to 7 cm long, and are caniculate. Immature leaves are occasionally toothed and hairy.

The calyx is campanulate, 5-6mm long and almost glabrous; the corolla is some 5 cm long, with the tube softly pubescent; panicle large, usually softly pubescent. Fruits are slender, flat, paired pods up to 60 x 1 cm, cylindrical, pendulous, spirally twisted, smooth, splitting in two and releasing many flat, long, narrow seeds winged at each end, 2.5–3 cm long. The remains of the pods persist on the tree for several months. Preferring sandy and clay soils, it is often found in association with termite mounds.

The timber is white with yellowish or pinkish stains, and is used for making mortars. The bark is used for treating bronchitis and other pulmonary complaints, while roots and leaves are also used in traditional medicine.

== Phytochemicals ==
Analysis has shown the presence of sterols, coumarins, higher fatty acids, and the absence of flavones, aglycone and alkaloids. In vitro, extracts from the tree have proven effective against Pseudomonas aeruginosa, Staphylococcus aureus, Escherichia coli, Salmonella spp, Aeromonas hydrophila and Klebsiella spp.

Decoctions and infusions of the fruits, bark and roots are used in traditional medicine for pharyngeal affections, leprosy, subcutaneous parasitic infections and other skin afflictions, venereal diseases, diarrhoea, dysentery, and as antiemetics, febrifuges, analgesics, vermifuges, diuretics and laxatives.

== Gallery ==
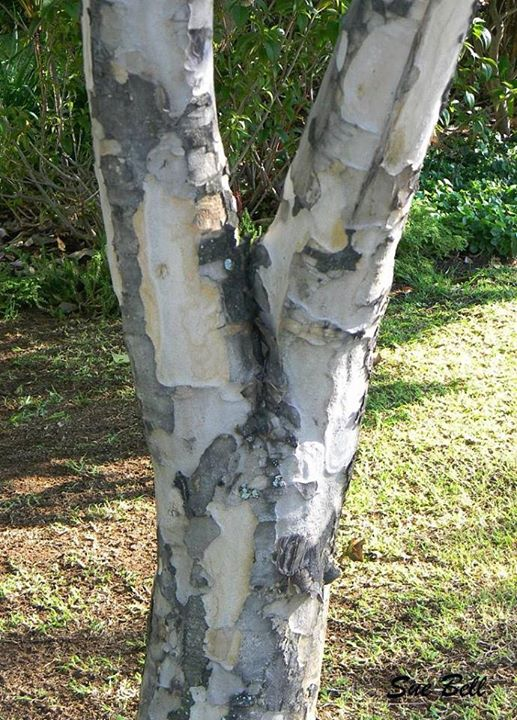

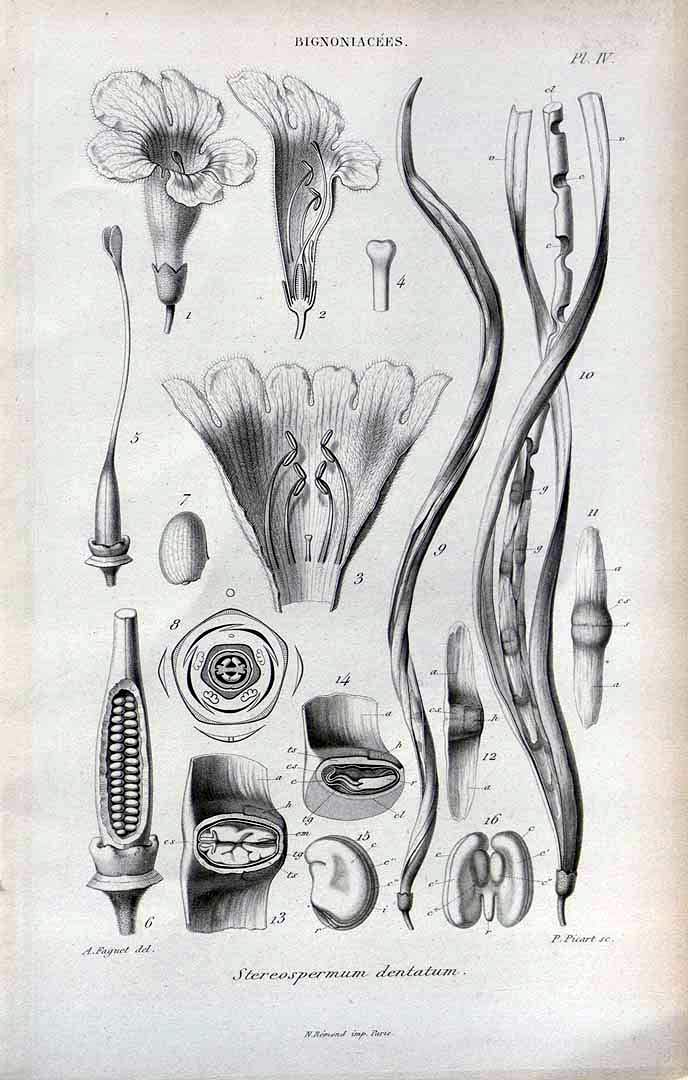
Plate by Auguste Faguet (1841–1886)
