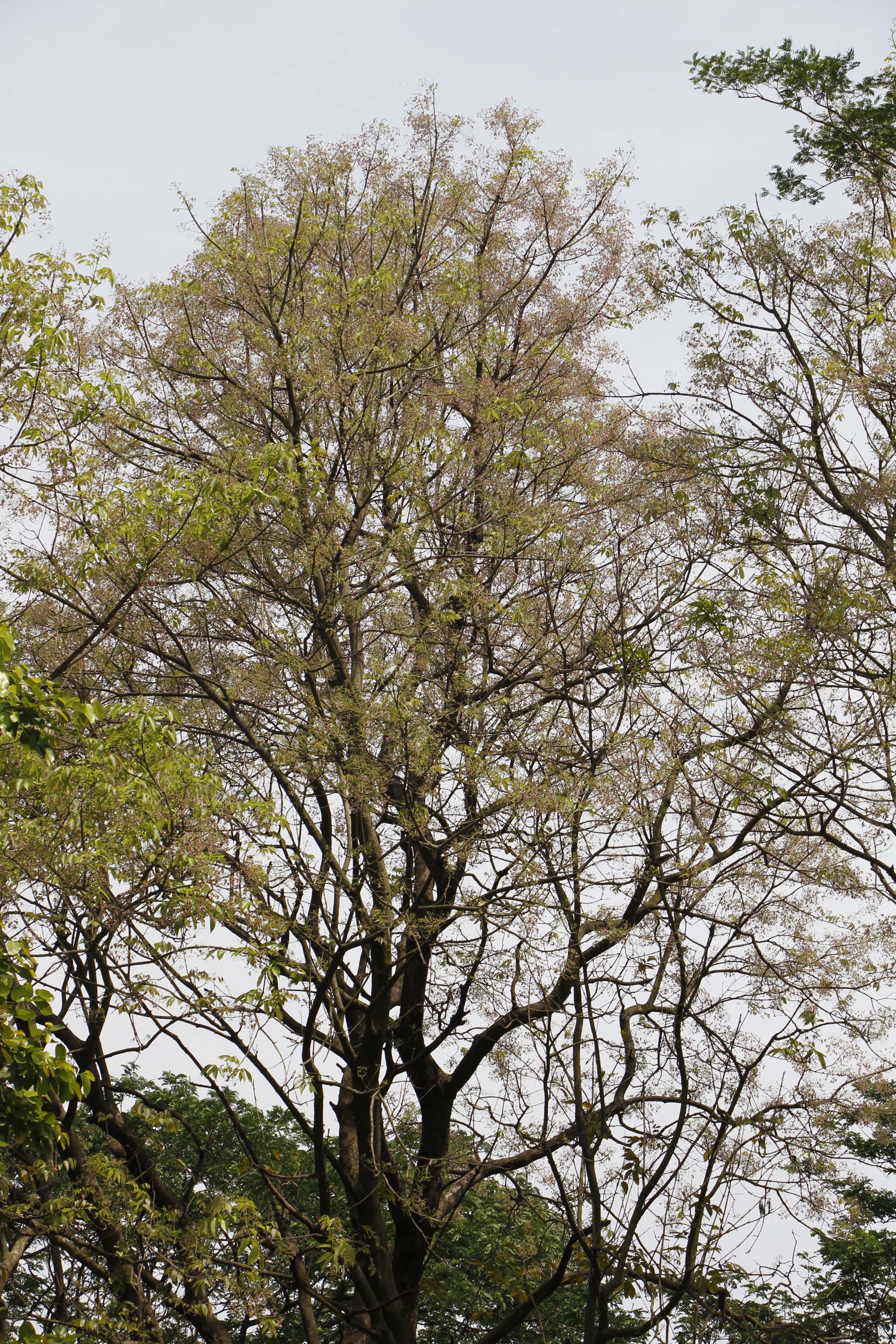
- In Bangladesh

Conservation status
- Least Concern (IUCN 3.1)

Scientific classification
- Kingdom: Plantae
- Clade: Tracheophytes
- Clade: Angiosperms
- Clade: Eudicots
- Clade: Asterids
- Order: Lamiales
- Family: Bignoniaceae
- Genus: Stereospermum
- Species: S. chelonoides

Binomial name
- Stereospermum chelonoides DC.

Synonyms
- Bignonia chelonoides L.f.; Bignonia gratissima K.D.Koenig ex DC.; Bignonia suaveolens Roxb.; Heterophragma chelonoides (L.f.) Dalzell & A.Gibson; Heterophragma suaveolens (Roxb.) Dalzell & A.Gibson; Hieranthes fragrans Raf.; Spathodea suaveolens (Roxb.) Benth. & Hook.f.; Stereospermum suaveolens (Roxb.) DC.; Tecoma suaveolens (Roxb.) G.Don

= Stereospermum chelonoides =

Species of tree

Stereospermum chelonoides (Parul in Bengal region) is a deciduous tree native to South and Southeast Asia.

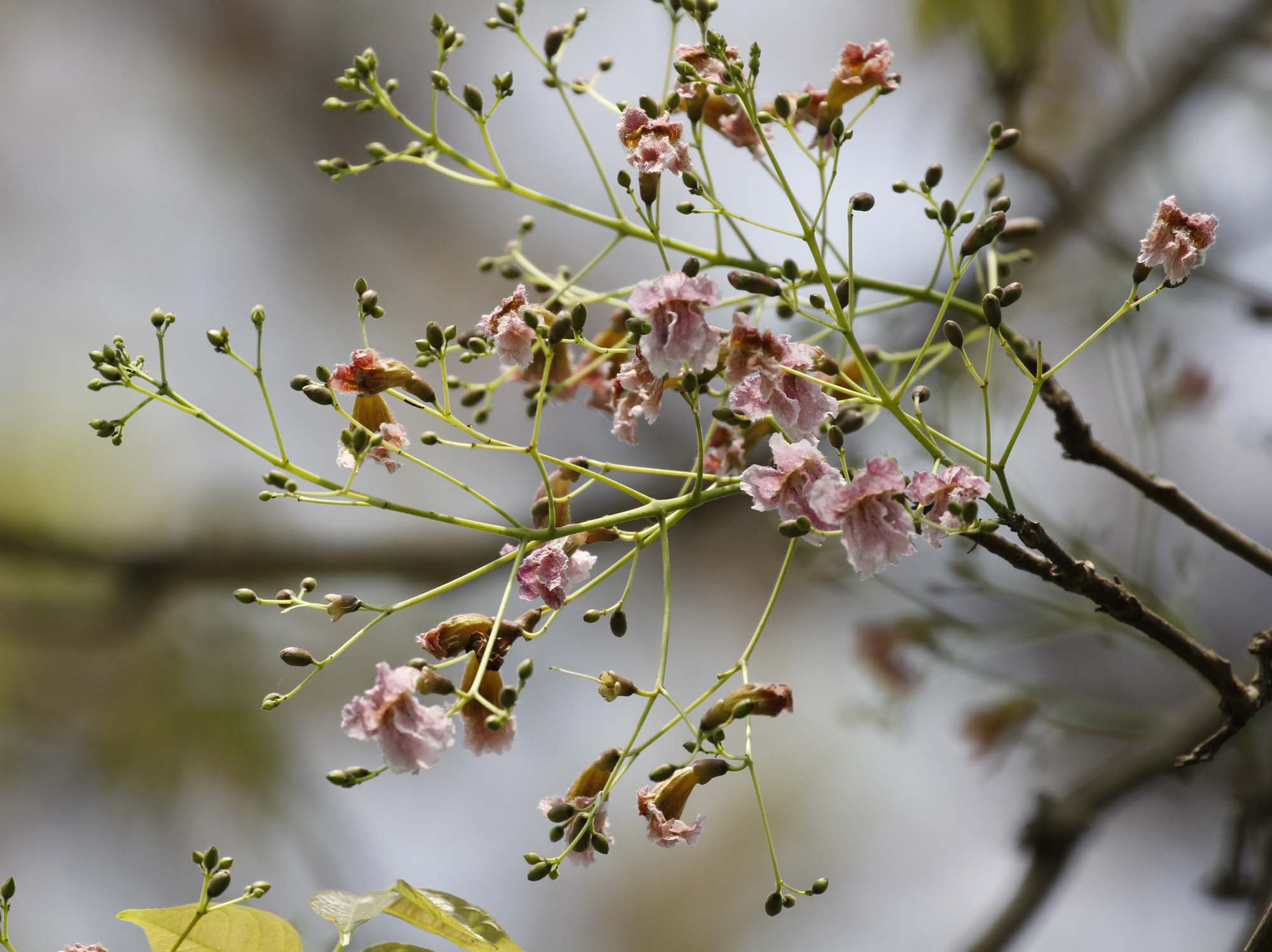
Flower in Bangladesh

In Theravada Buddhism, this plant is said to have been the tree under which the twenty second Buddha "Vipassi - විපස්සි" achieved enlightenment (Bodhi tree).

== Location ==
=== Bangladesh ===
There are a total of nine mature trees of this endangered species (Parul) in Bangladesh, five of which are located in the eastern part residential area of The Security Printing Corporation (Bangladesh) Ltd.
