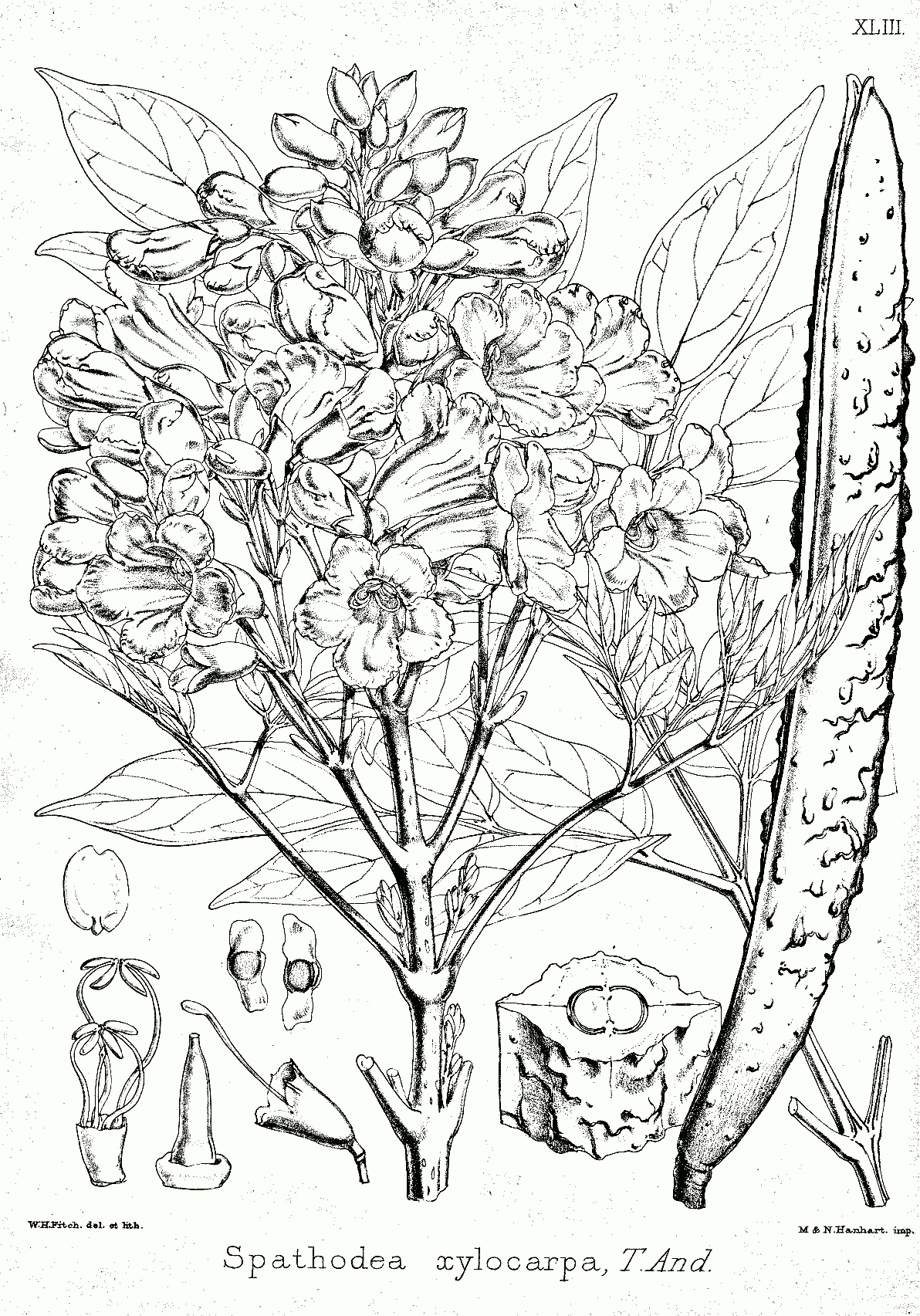
- Stereospermum xylocarpum

Scientific classification
- Kingdom: Plantae
- Clade: Tracheophytes
- Clade: Angiosperms
- Clade: Eudicots
- Clade: Asterids
- Order: Lamiales
- Family: Bignoniaceae
- Clade: Crescentiina
- Clade: Paleotropical clade
- Genus: Stereospermum; Cham., 1833

Synonyms
- Hieranthes Raf.; Dipterosperma Hassk.; Siphocolea Baill.

= Stereospermum =

Genus of trees

Stereospermum is a genus of trees in the paleotropical clade of the family Bignoniaceae. A species of Stereospermum (S. chelonoides) is used in herbal medicine in Ayurveda and is an integral part of the culture and tradition of the cold desert biosphere reserve.

== Species ==
Species include:

- Stereospermum acuminatissimum K.Schum.
- Stereospermum angustifolium Haines
- Stereospermum annamense Dop
- Stereospermum arcuatum H.Perrier
- Stereospermum boivini (Baill.) H.Perrier
- Stereospermum chelonoides (L.f.) DC.
- Stereospermum cylindricum Pierre ex Dop
- Stereospermum binhchauensis VS Dang
- Stereospermum euphorioides DC.
- Stereospermum fimbriatum (Wall. ex G.Don) DC.
- Stereospermum harmsianum K.Schum.
- Stereospermum hildebrandtii (Baill.) H.Perrier
- Stereospermum kunthianum Cham.
- Stereospermum leonense Sprague
- Stereospermum longiflorum Capuron
- Stereospermum nematocarpum (Bojer) DC.
- Stereospermum neuranthum Kurz
- Stereospermum rhoifolium (Baill.) H.Perrier
- Stereospermum strigilosum C.Y.Wu
- Stereospermum tetragonum DC.
- Stereospermum tomentosum H.Perrier
- Stereospermum undatum H.Perrier
- Stereospermum variabile H.Perrier
- Stereospermum zenkeri K.Schum. ex De Wild.
