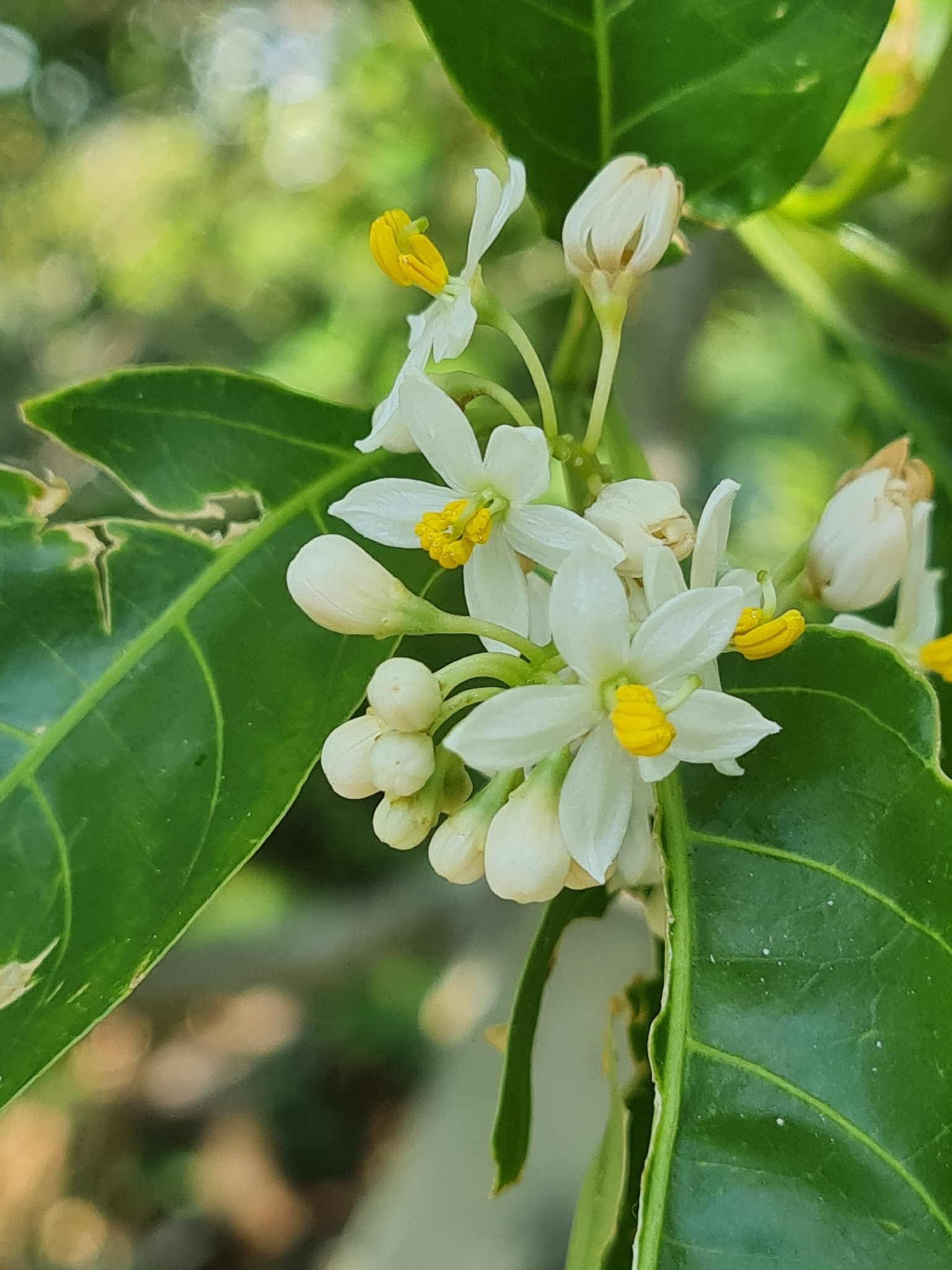

Conservation status
- Conservation Dependent (IUCN 2.3)

Scientific classification
- Kingdom: Plantae
- Clade: Tracheophytes
- Clade: Angiosperms
- Clade: Eudicots
- Clade: Asterids
- Order: Solanales
- Family: Solanaceae
- Genus: Solanum
- Species: S. pseudoquina

Binomial name
- Solanum pseudoquina A.St.-Hil.

Synonyms
- See text

= Solanum pseudoquina =

Species of flowering plant

Solanum pseudoquina is a species of plant in the family Solanaceae. It is endemic to Brazil. A rare plant, it is dependent on conservation of its habitat to prevent it from becoming a threatened species.

S. inaequale as described by da Conceição Vellozo is an invalid name for this plant that is sometimes still seen. Altogether, the following synonyms are assigned to this species:

- Cyphomandra flagrans (Ten.) Walp.
- Pionandra flagrans (Ten.) Miers
- Solanum flagrans Ten.
- Solanum inaequale Vell. (nonHornem.: preoccupied)

S. inaequale Hornem. is S. lanceolatum Cav.. S. inaequale C.Presl is S. lanceifolium Jacq..

- Solanum leiophyllum Dunal (non Benth.: preoccupied)
- Solanum pseudochina Spreng.
- Solanum ramosissimum Dunal
- Solanum undatifolium Dunal
