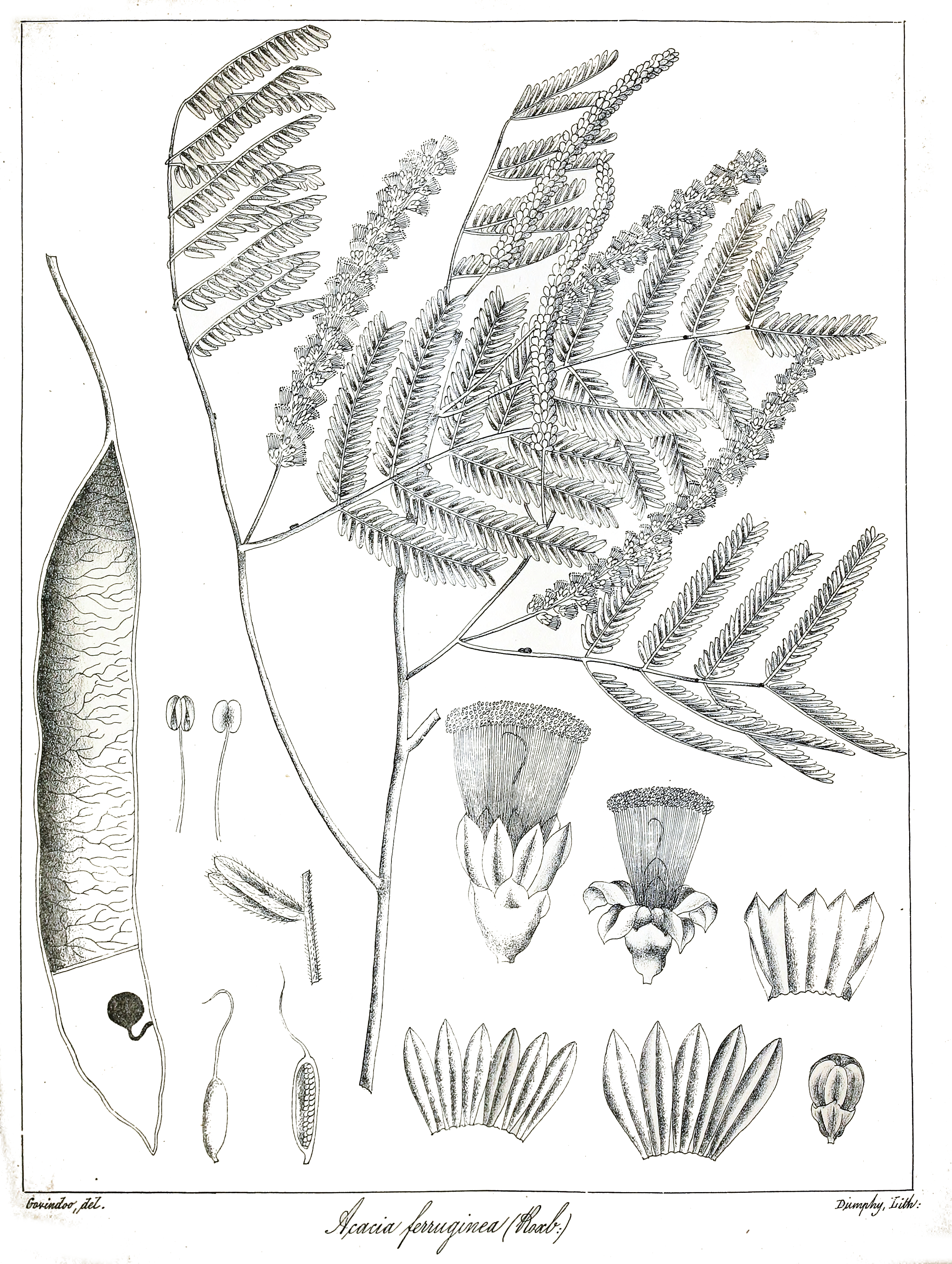

Conservation status
- Vulnerable (IUCN 2.3)

Scientific classification
- Kingdom: Plantae
- Clade: Tracheophytes
- Clade: Angiosperms
- Clade: Eudicots
- Clade: Rosids
- Order: Fabales
- Family: Fabaceae
- Subfamily: Caesalpinioideae
- Clade: Mimosoid clade
- Genus: Senegalia
- Species: S. ferruginea

Binomial name
- Senegalia ferruginea (DC.) Pedley

Synonyms
- Acacia ferruginea DC.

= Senegalia ferruginea =

Species of legume

Senegalia ferruginea is a species of plant in the family Fabaceae. It is found in India and Sri Lanka.
