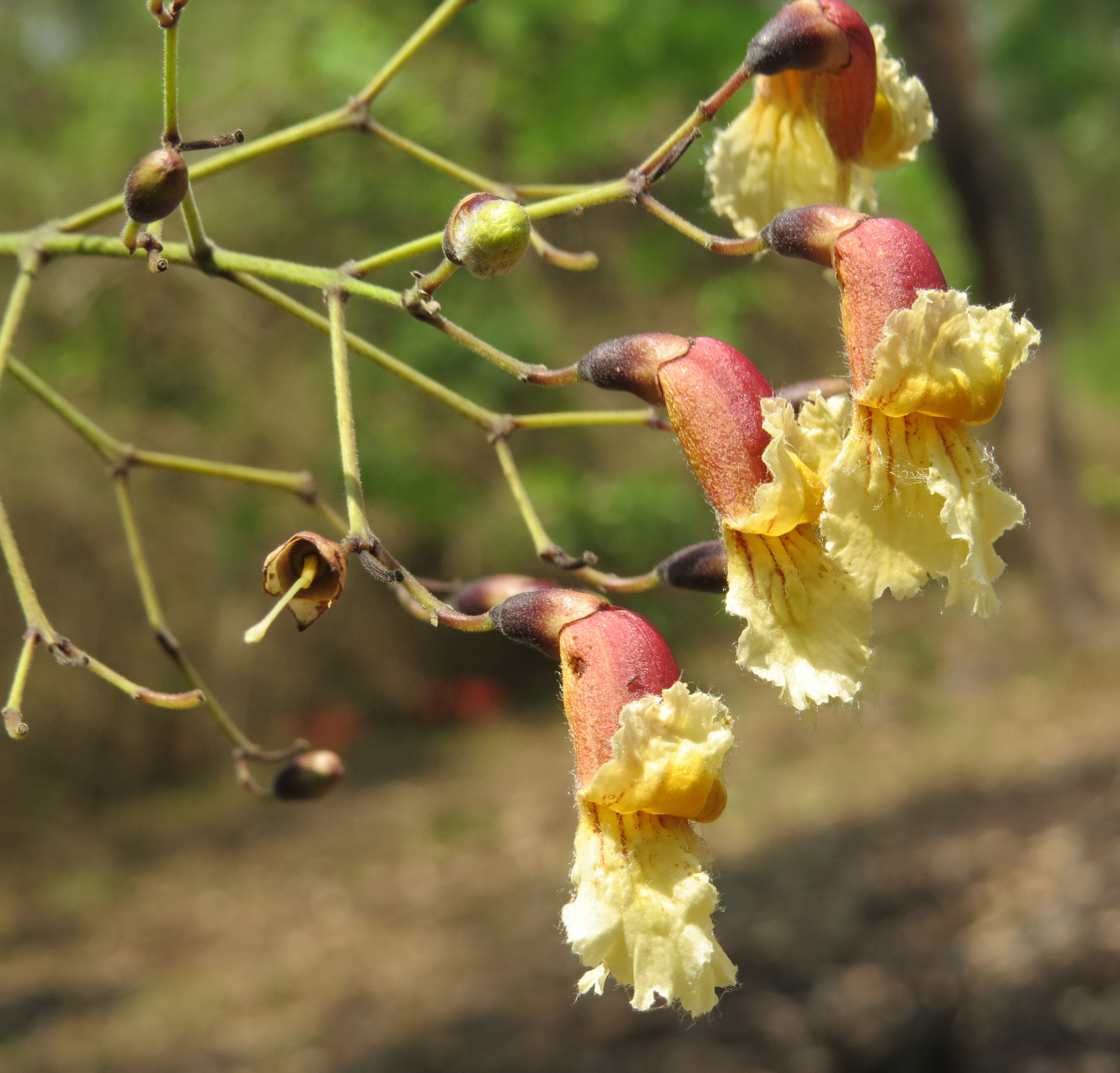
- Flowers of S. colais photographed near Panavally, India

Conservation status
- Least Concern (IUCN 3.1)

Scientific classification
- Kingdom: Plantae
- Clade: Tracheophytes
- Clade: Angiosperms
- Clade: Eudicots
- Clade: Asterids
- Order: Lamiales
- Family: Bignoniaceae
- Genus: Stereospermum
- Species: S. colais

Binomial name
- Stereospermum colais (Buch.-Ham. ex Dillwyn) Mabb.

Synonyms
- List: Bignonia colais Buch.-Ham. ex Dillwyn; Dipterosperma personatum Hassk.; Bignonia caudata DC.; Bignonia tetragona Wall. ex DC.; Stereospermum tetragonum DC.; Stereospermum hasskarlii Zoll. & Moritzi; Stereospermum caudatum (DC.) Miq.; Bignonia caudata Miq. ex C.B.Clarke; Stereospermum personatum (Hassk.) Chatterjee; Stereospermum colais var. angustifolium Bennet & Raizada; Stereospermum colais var. angustifolium V.Chandrasekaran; Stereospermum colais var. puberulum (Dop) D.D.Tao

= Stereospermum colais =

Yellow snake tree

Species of tree

Stereospermum colais, the yellow snake tree, is 15–20 m tall, trunk 15–25 cm in diam, large leaves 25–50 cm; leaflets 3–6 on each side of midrib, long elliptic, 8-14 X 2.5–6 cm. Large, pale yellow, trumpet shaped flowers occur in panicles. Flowers are pale yellow, slightly curved, about 2 cm, upper lip 2-lobed, lower lip 3-lobed, tomentose at mouth, tube terete. The fruit is long, 4-angular, slightly curved, 30–70 cm, about 1 cm in diameter. This, probably, is the source of its common name, snake tree.

It is found in India, Myanmar and Sri Lanka: where it is "common in moist deciduous forests and occasional in openings or margins of evergreen forests, up to 1200 m."

In Vietnam, Stereospermum colais is known as quao núi. Its young leaves can be eaten as a vegetable in Vietnam's Central Highlands.
