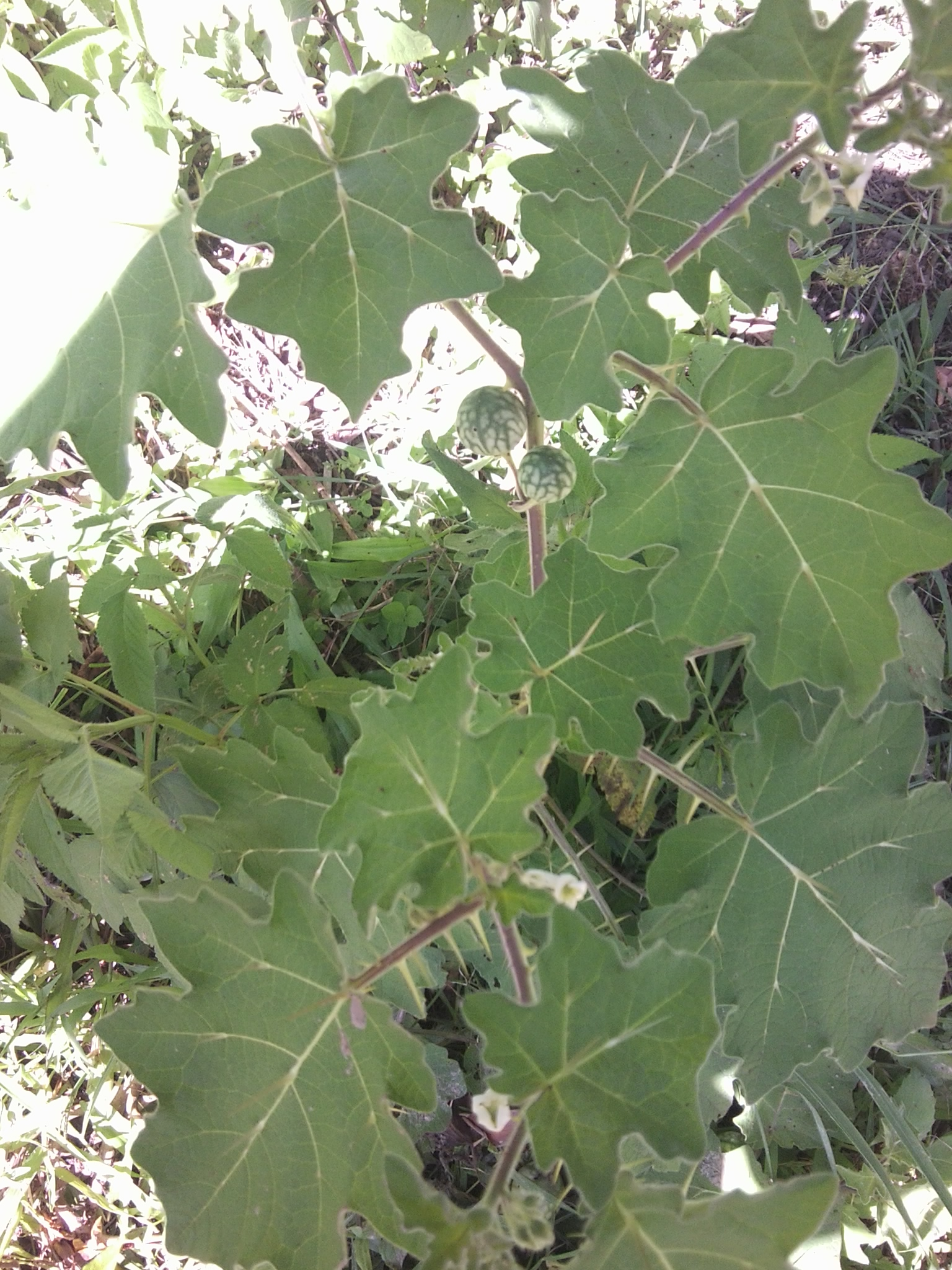

Scientific classification
- Kingdom: Plantae
- Clade: Embryophytes
- Clade: Tracheophytes
- Clade: Angiosperms
- Clade: Eudicots
- Clade: Asterids
- Order: Solanales
- Family: Solanaceae
- Genus: Solanum
- Species: S. virginianum

Binomial name
- Solanum virginianum L.

Synonyms
- List: Solanum arabicum Dunal; Solanum armatum Forssk.; Solanum ferox Burm.f.; Solanum gula Buch.-Ham.; Solanum jacquinii Willd.; Solanum jacquinii Miq.; Solanum macannii Santapau; Solanum mairei H.Lév.; Solanum melongena Wall.; Solanum surattense Burm.f.; Solanum virginicum L.; Solanum xanthocarpum Schrad.

= Solanum virginianum =

Species of fruit and plant

Solanum virginianum, the Surattense nightshade, yellow-fruit nightshade, yellow-berried nightshade, Indian nightshade, Thai green eggplant, or Thai striped eggplant (from the unripe fruit), is a medicinal plant used mostly in India. Some parts of the plant, such as the fruit, are poisonous. Solanum surattense Burm. f. and Solanum xanthocarpum Schrad. and Wendl. are synonyms of Solanum virginianum L. (Sharma et al., 2010).

== Description ==
Solanum virginianum is an erect herb, that is sometimes woody at the base, and measures 50–70 cm (20–28 in) tall. It is copiously armed with sturdy, needlelike, and broad-based prickles measuring 5-20 mm x 0.5-1.5 mm.

The plant has ovate-oblong, sinuated leaves that are unequally paired, with blades measuring 4-9 cm × 2-4.5 cm. They have an acute apex, unequal lobes and are either pinnate or possessive of usually 5-9 lobes. The veins and stalks of the leaves are prickly, and the stalks have a length of 2-3.5 cm.

The racemose inflorescence of the plant is 4-7 cm tall, and the bell-shaped sepal tube has a diameter of 1 cm.

The blue-purple flowers measure 1.4–1.6 cm × 2.5 cm. The petals are ovate-deltate, measure 6–8 mm, and are densely pubescent with stellate hairs. The filaments have a measurement of 1 mm, the anthers 8 mm, and the style 1 cm.

The fruiting pedicels of Solanum virginianum are 2–3.6 cm tall. They have prickles and sparse stellate hairs, while the fruiting sepals are prickly and sparsely pubescent. Pale yellow berries of 1.3–2.2 cm in diameter are produced, when ripe the yellow fruits are around 3 cm in diameter. Flowering normally appears around November to May.

== Occurrence ==
Solanum virginianum is cultivated in the Himalayas, southeast Malaysia, Australia, and Polynesia. It is commonly found in open spaces, along roadsides, and elsewhere in India.

== Medicine ==
In-vitro antioxidant and in-vivo antimutagenic properties of Solanum xanthocarpum seed extracts have been examined by qualitative phytochemical screening, which reveals the presence of polyphenols, flavonoids, glycoside, alkaloids, carbohydrates, and reducing sugar in the plant. Based on preliminary qualitative phytochemical screening, quantitative estimation of polyphenols in the plant has also been performed. The quantitative estimation of alcoholic extracts found significant amounts of polyphenols, as compared to aqueous extracts. In-vitro antioxidant studies have been performed by two methods: DDPH, and a superoxide radical scavenging method. The alcoholic extracts showed significant antioxidant properties, as compared to aqueous extracts. Based on polyphenols and antioxidant properties, alcoholic extracts were used for the antimutagenic (clastogenic) test. The alcoholic extracts produced significant results regarding the antimutagenic activity.

== Gallery ==
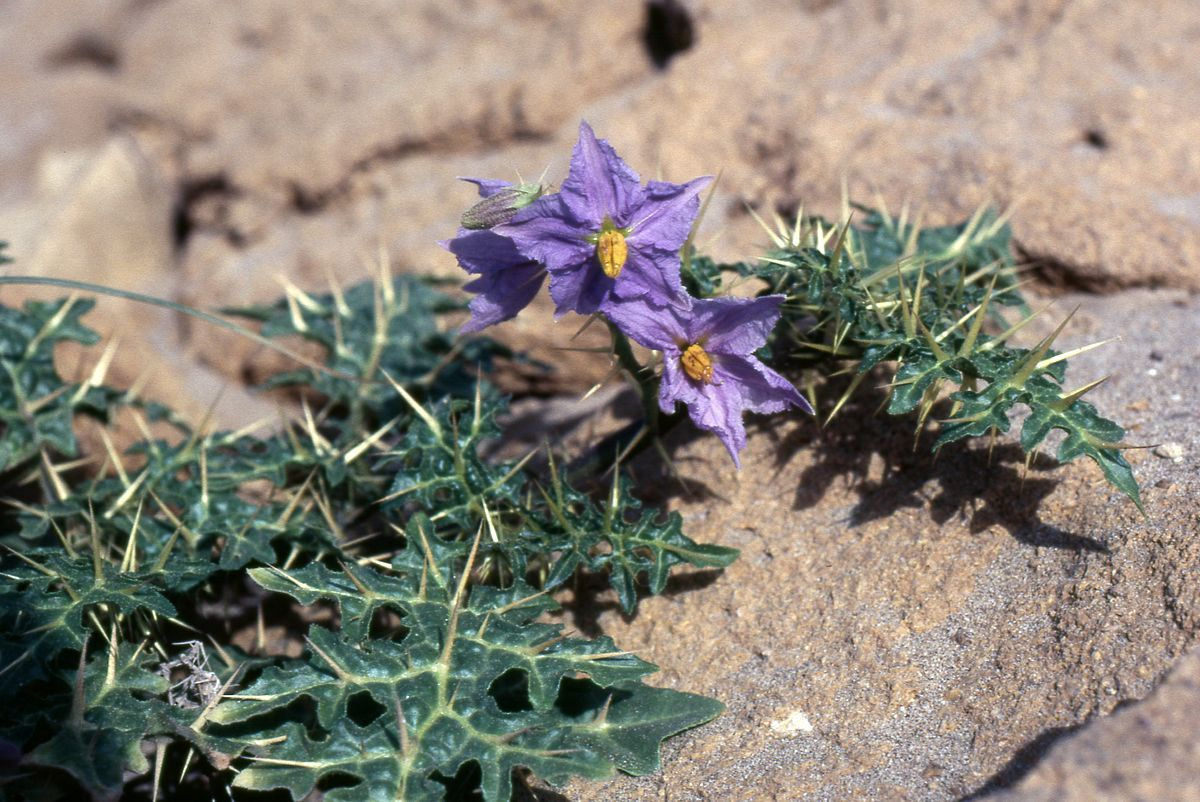
The plant

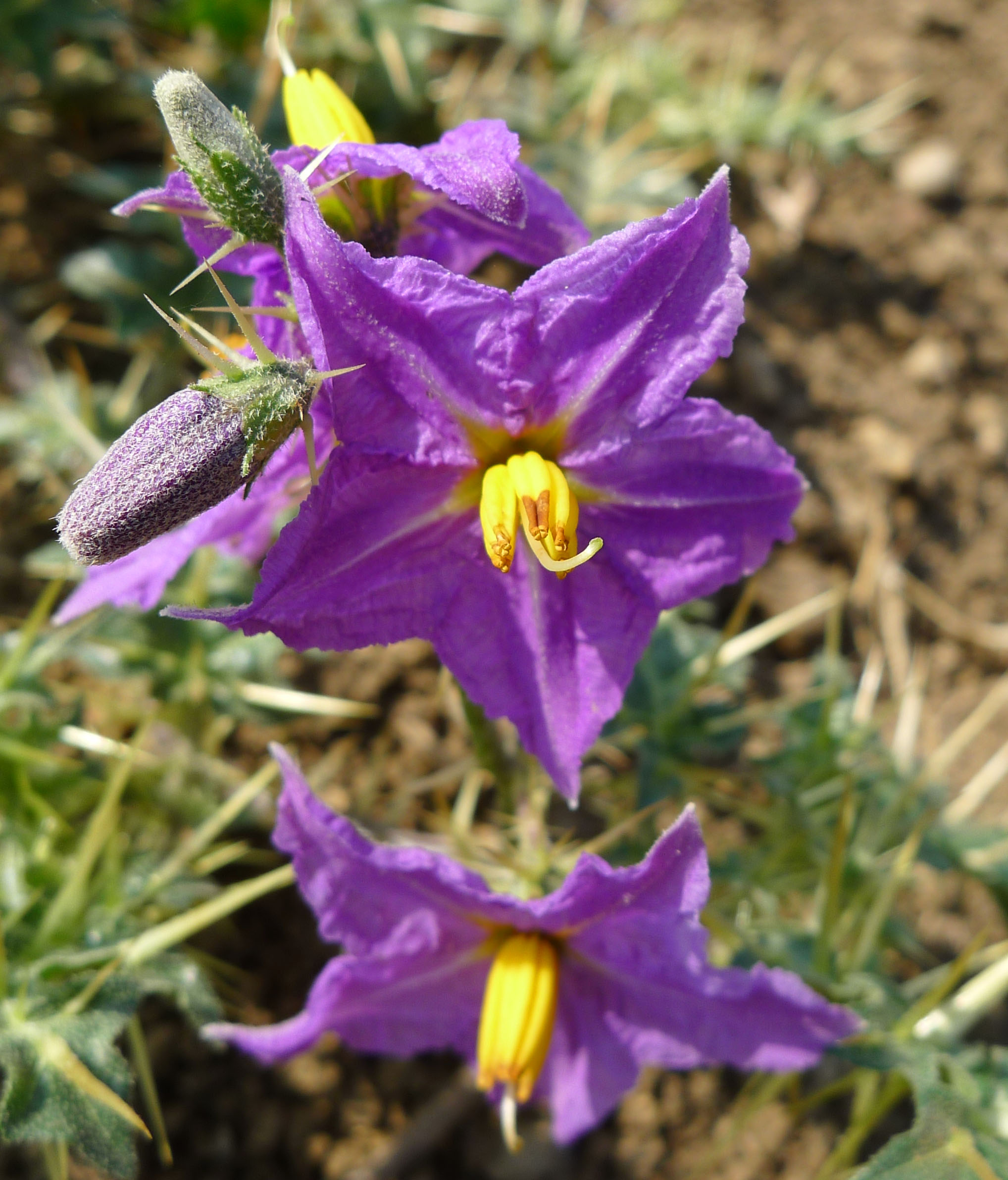
The flowers

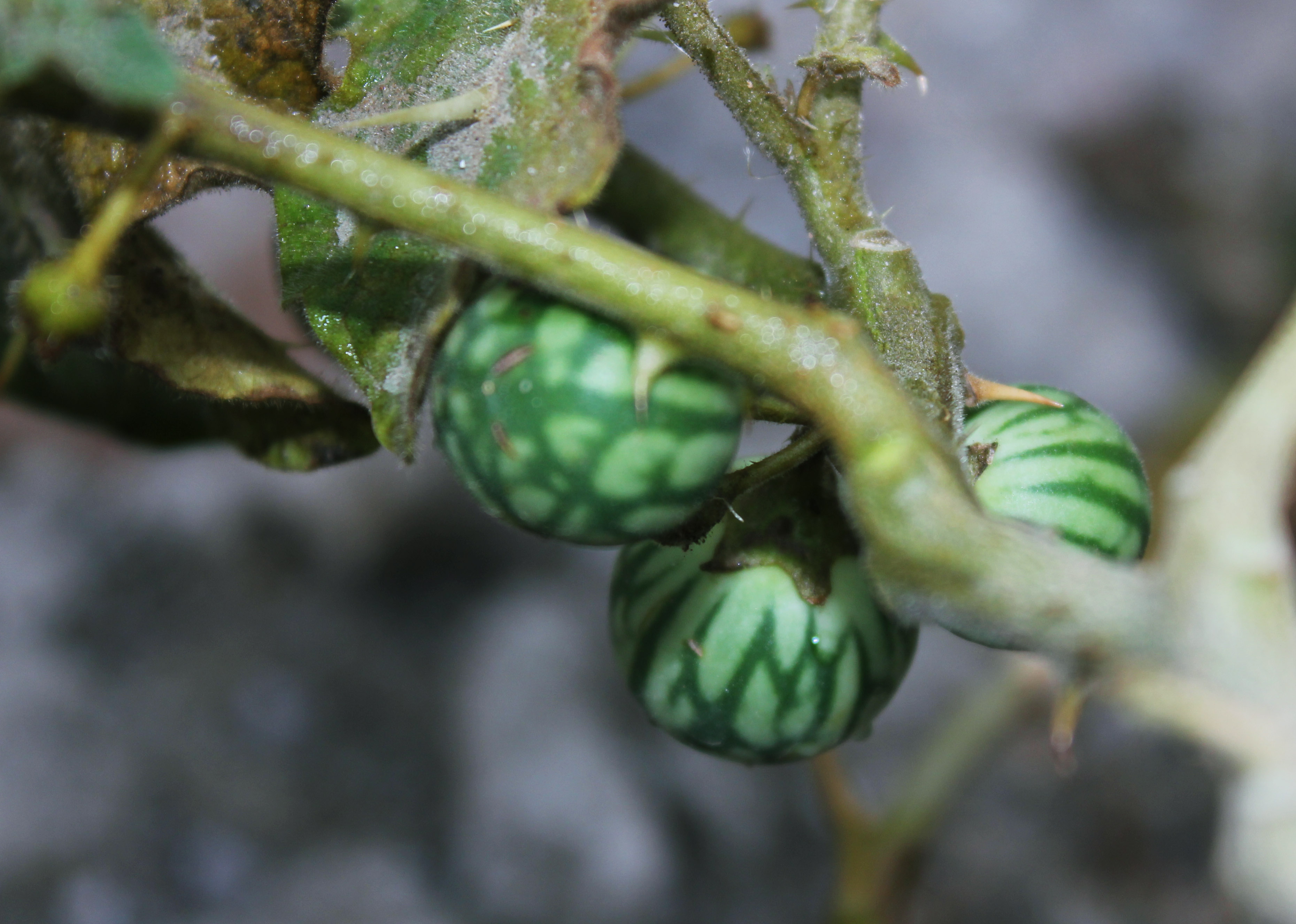
The immature fruits

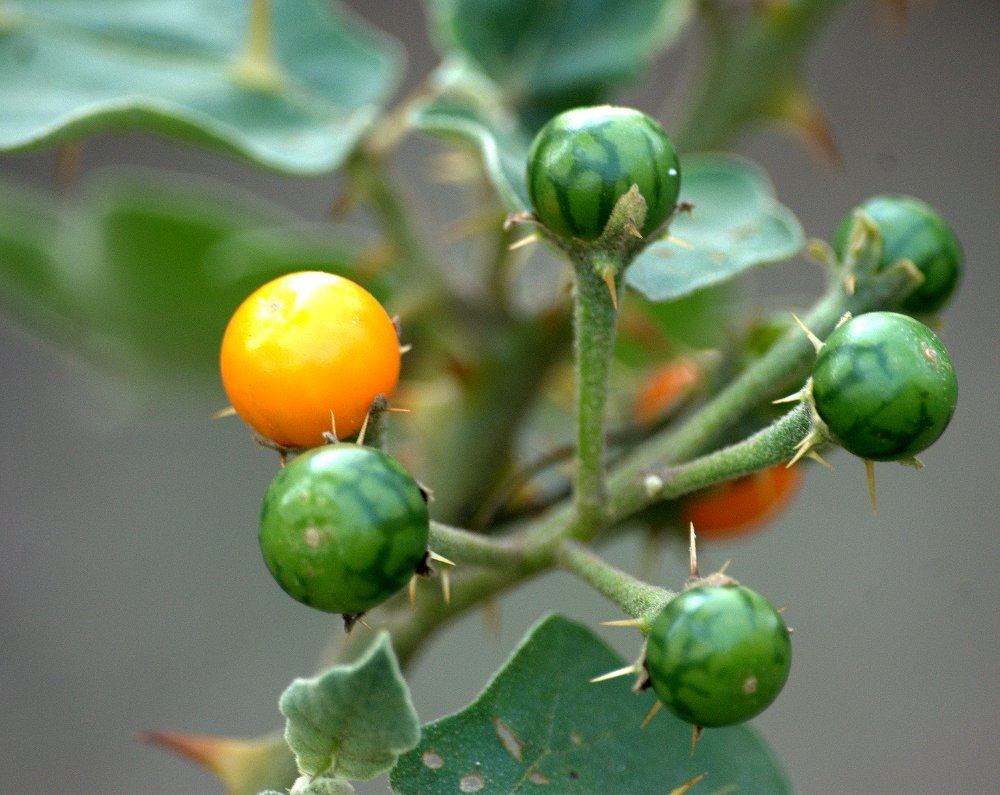
Unripe (green) and ripe (yellow)

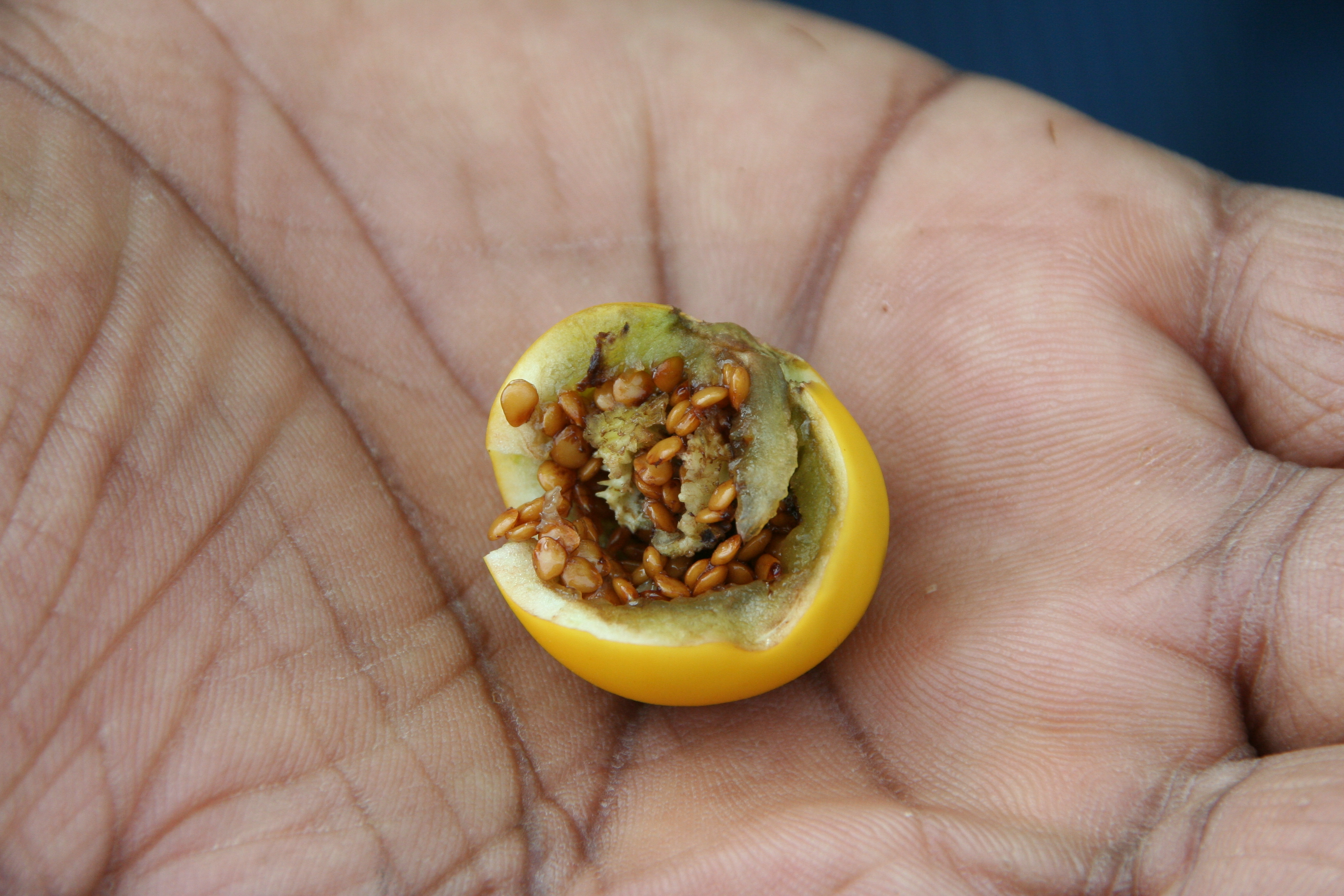
A fruit opened

== See also ==
- Thai eggplant
- Solanum macrocarpon - also called Vietnamese eggplant or African eggplant
