= Bandhwari =

- Village
- Location in Haryana, India Bandhwari (India)
- Coordinates: 28.416°N 77.150°E
- Country: India
- State: Haryana
- District: Gurgaon
- Time zone: UTC+5.30 (IST)
- ISO 3166 code: IN-HR

Bandhwari is a village dominated by Gurjar community in Gurgaon district in the Indian state of Haryana. It is an important biodiversity area contiguous to Asola Bhatti Wildlife Sanctuary within the Northern Aravalli leopard wildlife corridor. Bandhwari is also nicknamed the "strong village

== Administration ==
Bandhwari is 14.28 kilometres (8.87 mi) from the tehsil's main town Gurgaon. It has a population of about 13454 persons living in around 3635 households. It is 261 kilometres (162 mi) from the state main city Chandigarh. Nearby sectors are 55, 58, 59, and 60 and it is near to Gurgaon Faridabad road. There is a natural racing track near the village which is regularly used by various racing enthusiasts on weekends for rally and SUV drive events.

Other villages in Gurgaon Mandal are Babupur, Badha, Bajghera, Bamroli, Basai, Chakkarpur, Daultabad, Dhanwapur and Chandu.

== Bandwari hills biodiversity area ==
=== Forest ===
Bandhwari along with neighbouring villages of Gwal Pahari, Baliawas and Mangar Bani, which lies near the forested parts of Southern Delhi Ridge of Aravalli Range, is an ecologically sensitive under threat biodiversity area dotted with disused mining pits. The flora, fauna and ecology have degraded and severely needs restoration by replacing the invasive Vilayati kikar weed by the 3-layer cover of native grass, shrubs and trees. This area lies in the habitat of leopards.

=== Restoration ===
To restore the ground water recharge, the Haryana govt is building a check dam in the hills of bandwari forest. This will protect the water logging in the rain as well as provide the water for the wild animals of the forests during the dry summer months.

=== Concerns: Landfill, waste-to-energy plant and Cancer ===
A waste-to-energy plant on which govt has already spent INR300 crore is being expanded with another INR400 crore with two of sand mine pits to be used for dumping the untreated toxic waste, this has caused serious environmental threat to the sensitive ecology.

In 2017, National Green Tribunal (NGT) asked the Central Pollution Control Board (CPCB) to the test the groundwater sample near Bandhwari plant as the landfill site has a stream of dirty black water pollution the aquifers and leeching in to the forest in the area which is known to discharge industrial waste and construction debris in the Aravalli forests along the roads in Gurugram-Fridabad area.

== Location ==
Distance from other villages:

- Gurgaon gaon (5.43 km)
- Behrampur (4.834 km)
- Kadarpur (5.218 km)
- Samaspur (8.117 km)
- Mohammad Pur Jharsa (8.256 km)
- Mohmmad Pur Gujjar (8.256 km)
- Behlpa (8.432 km)
- Kherla (8.447 km)

== See also ==
- Delhi Ridge
- Leopards of Haryana
- Gurugram leopard and deer safari
- List of national parks and wildlife sanctuaries of Haryana
- Badshahpur
- Gurugram Airstrip
- Silokhera
