= Dhankot =

- Village
- Location in Haryana, India Dhankot (India)
- Country: India
- State: Haryana
- Region: North India
- District: Gurgaon

Languages
  - Official: Hindi
- Time zone: UTC+5:30 (IST)
- PIN: 122505
- ISO 3166 code: IN-HR
- Vehicle registration: HR-26, 72
- Website: haryana.gov.in

Dhankot is a village in Gurgaon, Gurgaon District, Haryana, in India. Dhankot is 6.842 km distance from its mandal main town Gurgaon. Dhankot is 8.327 km distance from its district main city Gurgaon. It lies on Basai road towards Farukh Nagar. The average sex ratio of Dhankot village is 849, which is lower than Haryana state average of 879. However, the child sex ratio for Dhankot as per the 2011 census is 951, higher than the Haryana average of 834.

Other villages in Gurgaon Mandal are Babupur, Badha, Bajghera, Bamroli, Bandhwari, Bargujar, Basai, Chakkarpur, Chandu, Daultabad, and Dhanwapur. Nearby villages of this village with distance are Garhi Harsaru (3.737 km), Harsaru (3.831 km), Chandu (3.848 km), Daulatabad (4.123 km), Budhera (4.530 km), Dharampur (4.777 km), Kadipur (4.899 km). Its geographical coordinates are 28° 29' 0" North, 76° 57' 0" East.

== History ==
The town has mythological significance. It is believed that it was from this place that milk was supplied to Guru Dronacharya and his pupils at Gurugram (Gurgaon). According to Buddhist literature, Dhankot is also known as Thullkottiha (थुलकोठिया) (or Dhool kot, in common language) and Lord Buddha is said to have visited this place.

Until 1947 Dhankot was in the possession of Ranghar Muslim Chauhans (Dhundhoti). The majority of those ranghars settled in Sikandarabad in [Multan District of Pakistan] after migration. After their departure to Pakistan, the land was allotted to the arriving Hindu refugees from Pakistan and its name was changed from Dhoolkot to Dhankot.

== Population ==
Population of Dhankot is 5585 according to Census 2011, where male population is 3020 and female population is 2565.
