= Basai =

- Village
- Location in Haryana, India Basai (India)
- Coordinates: 28.461259°N 76.98437°E
- Country: India
- State: Haryana
- Region: North India
- District: Gurgaon
- Established: 1535

Languages
  - Official: Hindi
- Time zone: UTC+5:30 (IST)
- PIN: 122002
- ISO 3166 code: IN-HR
- Vehicle registration: HR
- Website: haryana.gov.in

Basai is a village in Gurgaon Mandal, Gurgaon District, Haryana, India. Basai is 4 km distance from its district main city Gurgaon and 282 km distance from its state main city Chandigarh. It has a population of about 20,980 persons living in around 2,195 households. Basai village is famous for the Basai wetland home of endangered migrant birds.

== Location ==
Other villages in Gurgaon Tehsil are Jharsa, Gadoli, Bajghera, Bamroli, Kadipur, Khandsa, Chakkarpur, Chandu, Daultabad and Dhanwapur.

Nearby villages of this village with distance are Dhankot (2.916 km) and Sohna (30 km).

== Administration ==
Basai Pin Code is 122006 and the post office name is Basai. Other villages in Pin Code 122006 are Basai and Gadoli.

== Basai wetland ==
The Basai village is also the location of Basai wetland, recognised globally as an Important Bird Area by the BirdLife International housing 20,000 birds of over 280 species including migratory and endangered birds, has not yet been declared a protected wetland by the Government of Haryana.

== See also ==
- Gurugram Bhim Kund (Hindi: गुरुग्राम भीम कुंड), also known as Pinchokhda Jhod (Hindi: पिंचोखड़ा जोहड़)
- Delhi Ridge
- Leopards of Haryana
- Gurugram leopard and deer safari
- List of national parks and wildlife sanctuaries of Haryana
