= Palra, Gurgaon =

Palra
- Village
- Interactive map of Palra
- Country: India
- State: Haryana
- District: Gurgaon

Population
  - Total: 2,803
- Time zone: UTC+5:30 (IST)

Palra is a village in the Gurgaon district of Haryana, India.

== Geography ==
It is 14.8 km (9.2 mi) from its tehsil headquarter Sohna and 8.7 km (5.4 mi) from its district headquarter Gurgaon, 263 km (163 mi) from its Haryana state capital Chandigarh. It lies near 68, 70A and 77 sectors of Gurgaon.

Villages near Palra, with distance, are Hasanpur (to the west), Teekli (1.5 km [0.93 mi]), Darbaripur (2 km [1.2 mi]), Aklimpur (1.5 km [0.93 mi]), Sakatpur (2.6 km [1.6 mi]), Badshahpur (3.2 km [2.0 mi]), Shikohpur (3.8 km [2.4 mi]), Kherki Daula (4.5 km [2.8 mi]), Bhondsi (5 km [3.1 mi]).

== Demography ==
It has a population of about 2803 persons living in around 507 households.

== Prominent residents ==
- Anup Kumar: Palra made history when Anup Kumar, a member of the India national kabaddi team, won gold medal in 2010 Asian Games.

== See also ==
- Gurgaon division
