= Teekli =

- Village
- Location in Haryana, India Teekli (India)
- Coordinates: 28.356359°N 77.030465°E
- Country: India
- State: Haryana
- Region: North India
- District: Gurgaon

Languages
  - Official: Hindi
- Time zone: UTC+5:30 (IST)
- PIN: 122101
- ISO 3166 code: IN-HR
- Vehicle registration: HR
- Website: haryana.gov.in

Teekli is a village in Sohna Mandal, Gurgaon District, Haryana state, India. It is 33.85 km south of India's capital New Delhi and lies in the foothills of the Aravali Mountains. It has a population of about 17,234 (approx) persons living in around 1,390 households. Teekli is dominated by Yadavs.

In late 1950s a few hundred Yadavs from Teekli moved to establish the new village of Samaspur.

Gurgaon Bus Stand is just 14 km away from Teekli. Autos runs from Teekli to Badshahpur every 10 minutes. Nearby villages of this village are Aklimpur, Palra, Nurpur Jharsa, Badshahpur, Sakatpur, Gairatpur Baas, Bhondsi, etc.

== Airport ==
Indira Gandhi International Airport is 31 km from Teekli.

== Politics ==
Teekli is in Badshahpur constituency and Rao Narbir is the sitting MLA. Smt. Pooja is Sarpanch (Pardhan) of Teekli. Teekli has approximately 5,000 voters.

== Schools ==
- Govt. Sr. Sec School.
- Govt. High School(Girls)
- Shri Chitragupt High School.
- Global Public school.
- Mother's Shadow Play School
- Bachpan Play School
- Mount Saint Mary's School Gurugram
