= Dhanwapur =

- Village
- Location in Haryana, India Dhanwapur (India)
- Coordinates: 28.446317°N 77.06452°E
- Country: India
- State: Haryana
- Region: North India
- District: Gurgaon

Languages
  - Official: Hindi
- Time zone: UTC+5:30 (IST)
- PIN: 122003
- ISO 3166 code: IN-HR
- Vehicle registration: HR
- Website: haryana.gov.in

Dhanwapur is one of the villages in Gurgaon Mandal in Gurgaon District in Haryana state. Dhanwapur is 2.940 km far from its district main city Gurgaon. It is 252 km far from its state main city Chandigarh. One can follow Dhanwapur road on LT Kataria Marg to reach the village.

Babupur, Badha, Bajghera, Bamroli, Bandhwari, Bargujar, Basai, Chakkarpur, Chandu, Daultabad, and Dhanwapur are the villages along with this village in the same Gurgaon Mandal.

== Education in Dhanwapur ==
=== Colleges ===
- Guru Gram Business School

Address : laxman vihar, Dhanwapur road, Gurgaon Haryana, India.

- Guru Gram Institute of Aeronautical Engineering and Technology (GGIAET)

Address : laxman vihar, opposite Sector-4, Dhanwapur road, Gurgaon Haryana India.

== Banks near by Dhanwapur ==
1. ALLAHABAD Bank, Main DhanwapurRoad, Near Govt High School, Village Dhanwapur.
2. YES BANK LTD, HUDA Market, Gurgaon
3. State Bank of Travancore, Sector-18, Gurgaon (Specialised Commercial and Personal Banking Branch, Gurgaon)
4. DENA BANK, Gurgaon
5. Union Bank of India, Sector 52 Gurgaon
6. Gurgaon Gramin Bank, Sector 4 huda market, Gurgaon

== See also ==
- Gurgaon
- Haryana
