= Jharsa =

- Village
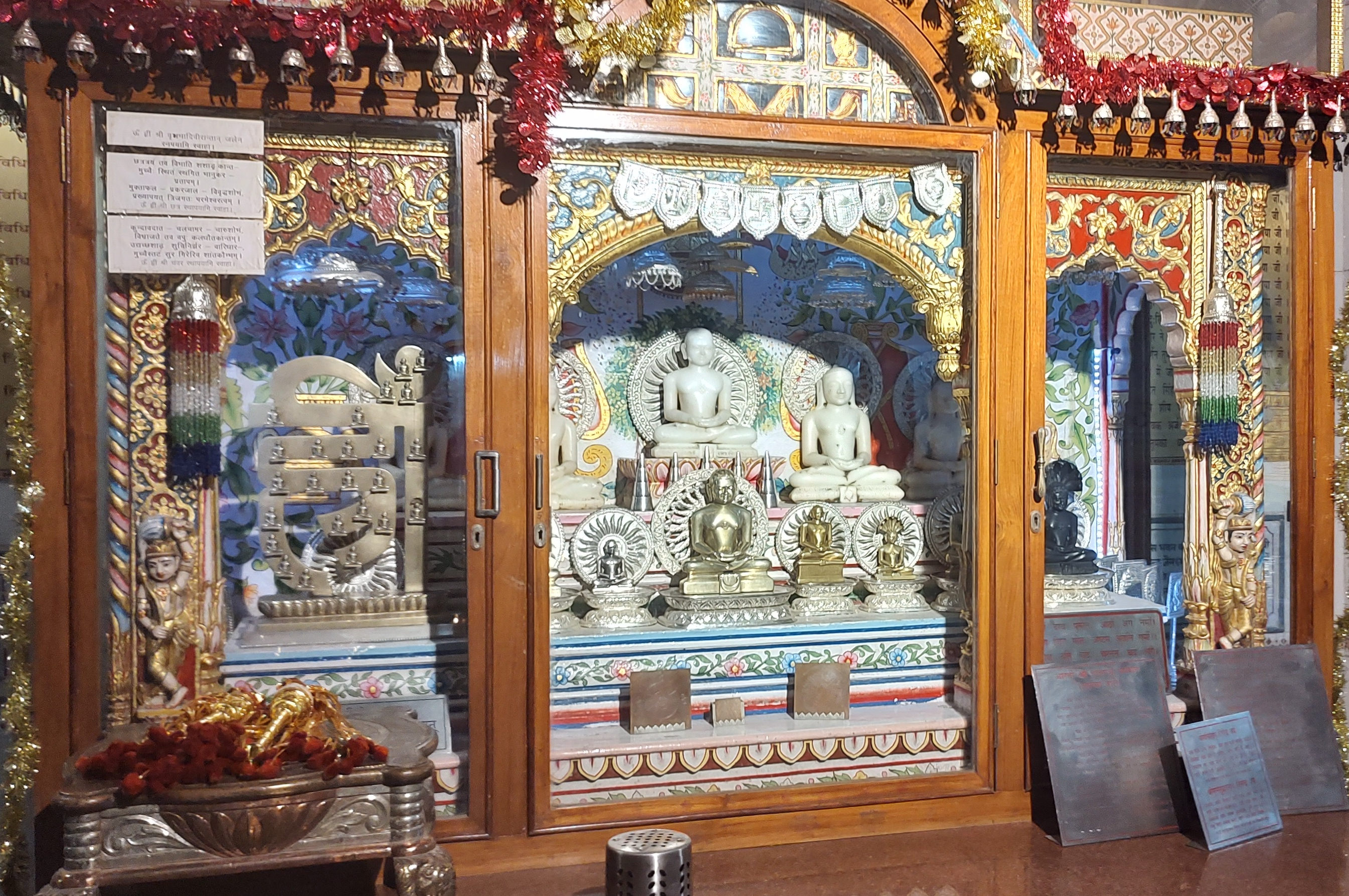
- Jharsa Jain temple

- Location in Haryana, India Jharsa (India)
- Coordinates: 28.444921°N 77.073627°E
- Country: India
- State: Haryana
- Region: North India
- District: Gurugram

Government
  - Type: Local government
  - Body: Municipal Corporation, Gurgaon

Languages
  - Official: Hindi Haryanvi
- Time zone: UTC+5:30 (IST)
- PIN: 122003
- ISO 3166 code: IN-HR
- Vehicle registration: HR-26-XX-XXXX
- Website: haryana.gov.in

Jharsa is a village in Sector 39, Gurugram city of Gurugram district in Haryana State, India. It has a population of about 32,709; it is located 10 kilometres (6.2 mi) from the Gurugram city centre and 254 kilometres (158 mi) from the state's main city, Chandigarh. It is surrounded by Mohyal Colony, Patel Nagar, Kirti Nagar, Sectors 15, 31, 32,38, 39,40, 45, 46, 47,and Indra Colony.

== History ==
=== Origin ===
The history of Jharsa dates back to medieval times. During the mughal and British colonial era, Jharsa was a paragana in Delhi subah, and Gurgaon was just a small village. The Report of a Tour in Eastern Rajputana in 1882-83, published in 1885 by Alexander Cunningham (the then Director-General of the Archaeological Survey of India), mentions a stone pillar at Gurgaon of a local feudal lord "Durgga Naga" with the 3-line inscription "Samvat 729 or 928, Vaisakh badi 4, Durgga Naga lokatari bhuta", dating back to 672 or 871 AD. The paragana of Badshahpur-Jharsa was ruled by Begum Samru (b.1753 – d.1836), who built a palace for herself between Badshahpur and Jharsa. Jharsa was the place of Samru's principal cantonment. She built palaces at Sardhana, Chandni Chowk in Delhi and Jharsa; parts of her fort compound have been completely lost to encroachments.

=== French memorial ===
Major Jean Etienne's tomb (also known as the "French Memorial of Jharsa") is the tomb of a Bordelais soldier in Begum Samru's army, presently located in a park at Mohyal colony in Jharsa of Sector-40 of Gurugram. Etienne, born in 1746, served Begum Samru from 1786 until his death on 5 June 1821. A restoration project for the tomb, to be undertaken by INTACH, was approved by the government in 2018.

=== Sheetla Mata temple ===
An idol of Sitla Mata in Gurugram, according to an 1882 land revenue settlement report, was brought there 400 years earlier (in the 15th century). Begum Samru claimed the offerings from the Sitla Mata temple of Gurugram during the Chaitra month, and the revenue from the offerings given to the deity during other months was distributed among prominent Ahir and Jat zamindars of the area. In 1818, Bharawas district was disbanded and Gurugram was made a new district, and in 1821, the Bharaswas cantonment was also moved to Hidayatpur in Gurugram.

=== Jain temple ===
An idol of Jain tirthankar Bhagwan Chanderprabhu which is around of the year 1450-1500 is situated in Village Jharsa ain one of the oldest Jain temple in Gurugram, also known as Shree 1008 Chander Prabhu Digambar Jain Temple.

=== British raj ===
Jharsa was taken over by the British in 1836 after Samru's death; they established a civil line at Jharsa, and a cavalry cantonment at nearby Hiyadatpur.

A palace building located between Gurgaon and Jharsa village was used as the official residence and camp office of the district collector of Gurugram district. Built in Islamic style, the ruins of this palace survived till about 2008 in Gurgaon.

Several people from Jharsa took part in the Indian rebellion of 1857. Among them was Bhakhtawar Singh Thakran, a jagirdar who aided the Mughal emperor Bahadur Shah, and was caught and hanged by the British for doing so. His property was given by the British to a native of Badshahpur village, as a reward for help against the rebels.

== Geography ==
=== Location ===
Jharsa lies near the Aravalli Range, within the Gurugram city in the National Capital Region. Other villages in the vicinity are Wazirabad, Samaspur, Islampur, Silokhera, Tigra, Ghata, and KanhaiJharsa.

=== Climate of Jharsa ===
Climate data for Jharsa
Month	Jan	Feb	Mar	Apr	May	Jun	Jul	Aug	Sep	Oct	Nov	Dec	Year
Mean daily maximum °F (°C)	70.0 (21.1)	75.6 (24.2)	86.0 (30.0)	97.2 (36.2)	103.3 (39.6)	102.7 (39.3)	95.2 (35.1)	91.9 (33.3)	93.0 (33.9)	91.2 (32.9)	82.9 (28.3)	73.4 (23.0)	88.5 (31.4)
Mean daily minimum °F (°C)	45.1 (7.3)	50.2 (10.1)	59.7 (15.4)	70.7 (21.5)	78.6 (25.9)	82.9 (28.3)	79.9 (26.6)	78.6 (25.9)	75.9 (24.4)	67.1 (19.5)	55.0 (12.8)	46.8 (8.2)	65.8 (18.8)
Average rainfall inches (mm)	0.80 (20.3)	0.59 (15.0)	0.62 (15.8)	0.26 (6.7)	0.69 (17.5)	2.16 (54.9)	9.11 (231.5)	10.19 (258.7)	5.03 (127.8)	1.43 (36.3)	0.20 (5.0)	0.31 (7.8)	31.39 (797.3)
Average rainy days	1.7	1.3	1.2	0.9	1.4	3.6	10.0	11.3	5.4	1.6	0.1	0.6	39.1
Mean monthly sunshine hours	213.9	217.5	238.7	261.0	263.5	198.0	167.4	176.7	219.0	269.7	246.0	217.0	2,688.4

== Notable residents ==
- Amit Kilhor, famous UPSC educator and UPSC reforms activist. Known to clear UPSC prelims 6 times and a leading voice of students
- Pritam Rani Siwach, a former women's hockey team captain of India
- Virender Singh (Dheeraj Pahalwan), a wrestler who won a bronze medal in the Junior World Wrestling Championship and won a silver medal in Commonwealth Wrestling Championship in 1995
- Komal Thakran, PhD and senior research fellow, University of Delhi. Author of various articles and books published in renowned journals and publishers, have clarity of languages: Portuguese, Swahili, Arabic. Her research areas include Indian Diaspora in Africa and Haryanvi issues and cultures.
- Vinay thakran (vicky Pahalwan) 7 school national gold medals 3 university national gold medals 2 junior national silver medals 1 beach national gold medal.

== See also ==
- List of National Parks & Wildlife Sanctuaries of Haryana, India
- List of Monuments of National Importance in Haryana
- List of State Protected Monuments in Haryana
- Indus-Sarasvati Valley Civilization sites in Haryana
- Haryana Tourism
