= Aravali Retreat, Gurgaon =

Aravali Retreat
- Country: India
- State: Haryana
- District: Sohna Tehsil, Gurgaon

Area
  - Total: 4.86 km^{2} (1.88 sq mi)

Languages
  - Official: Hindi, English
- Time zone: UTC+5:30 (IST)
- PIN: 122102
- ISO 3166 code: IN-HR
- Lok Sabha constituency: Gurgaon
- Vidhan Sabha constituency: Sohna
- Website: www.rarrwa.org

Aravali Retreat is a 1,200 acres (490 ha) gated community, located on Aravali hill range, approximately 35 kilometres (22 mi) south west from the Delhi's Indra Gandhi International Airport, in village Raisina, Sohna Tehsil, Gurgaon district, in the National Capital Region of India. The development includes 630 one and two acre fenced lots.

Pathways World School an International School, is located in the development. The school opened in 2003. In 2014 it had a student body of 1,100 students representing 40 countries.

The development has been the subject of numerous disputes regarding the legality of some structures built on the site. Local and national environmental agencies have embarked on numerous demolition drives to remove structures which have violated environmental laws.

== History ==
Aravali Retreat was developed and marketed by Ansal Properties and Infrastructure (API), a property developer in the NCR. The project was started in 1988-89. It was designed and developed by Colonel Sashi, a retired army engineer from the Indian Army Corps of Engineers. Individual lots were fenced, gated, and linked by internal roads. The developers also built water catchment areas, and a club house. To increase the "green cover" lakhs of indigenous trees and shrubs, including fruit bearing trees were planted, along the roads and in common areas. On some lots sample cottages were built by the developer. These were subsequently sold. The project was marketed in 1990-92, after completion of infrastructure. During this time, API sold over 630 farms, ranging in size from 1 acre to 2.85 acres. API, according to court documents, before developing and selling the lots, took the relevant permissions under the provisions of The Punjab Scheduled Roads and Controlled Areas (Restriction of Unregulated Development) Act,1963 and the Haryana Development and Regulation of Urban Areas Act, 1975, as affirmed by API court deposition [2012].

The Ministry Of Environment and Forest (MOEF), on 7 May 1992, issues a general notification covering areas shown as "reserved forests, protected forests", (a) Gair Mumkin Pahar, or (b) Gair Mumkin Rada, or (c) Gair Mumkin Behed, or (d) Banjad Beed, or (e) Rundh, on 7 May 1992 in relation to Gurgaon District in Haryana, and Alwar District in Rajasthan. The notification prohibits, amongst other things, mining, cutting of trees, construction of any clusters of dwelling units, farms houses, sheds, community centers, information centers and any other activity connected with such construction (including roads and part of any infrastructure relating thereto), and electrification (laying of new transmission lines) in the designated areas.

In 2003 the Pathway School started classes. The school was built on a contiguous 30 acres (12 ha) campus that includes play grounds, swimming pool, auditoriums, and on-campus residential accommodation for students and staff.

On 23 February 2006, the Collector of Gurgaon revoked the 1990 notification and categorizes Aravali Retreat as Gair Mumkin Pahar.

On 1 November 2006, the Ministry Of Environment and Forest (MOEF) issued clarification stating that the notification of 7 May 1992 does not apply to Aravali Retreat, as plots on it were categorized as ‘farm houses’ prior to the issue of the 1992 notification. The MOEF clarification noted: "In case the members of Aravali Plot Owners’ association have plots which in the land records maintained by the State Government as on the date of the Notification i.e. 7 May 1992 were categorized as "Farm House" i.e. not categorized in any of the categories i.e., a) "Gair Mumkin Pahal or b)"Gair Mumkin Rada or c) Gair Mumkin Behed or d) Banjad Beed or d) Banjad Beed or e) Rundh, then this Notification will not be applicable".

In 2007, Haryana State Pollution Control initiated litigation against Ansal API, the developers of Aravali retreat, and many plots owners, for violation of Aravali Notification dated 7 May 1992.

The Special Environment Court, Faridabad, ruled that according to documentary evidence submitted in the court Aravali Retreat is shown as the "Gair Mumkin Farm land" in revenue record of 1990-91 and not Gair Mumkin Pahar. The Special Environment Court, Faridabad, in the case filed by Haryana State Pollution Control Board (HSPCB) ruled in favor of Ansals. In its judgment the court states: "Thus the complainant/prosecution has miserably failed to prove upon file that Aravali Notification was applicable upon the Aravali Retreat the land of accused no.1 and he has further failed to prove upon file that any construction in any shape was made by accused no.1 after the issuance of Aravali Notification. Even no any construction by accused no.1 after re- change of Khasra Girdawari has been shown to be made. Hence accused no.1 is liable to be acquitted of the charge framed under section 15 of The Environment Protection Act for violation of Aravali Notification dated 7.5.1992".

In 2012, Aravali Retreat Plots Owners Association [ARPAN] is registered in Delhi under the Haryana Registration and Regulation of Societies Act, 2012.

In April 2012, Gurgaon district authorities demolished several properties in Aravali Retreat. The Aravali Retreat Plot owner's Association (ARPAN) denied that the residents violated any environmental laws including the Government notification dated 7 May 1992. Prompted by complaint by Haryana State Pollution Control, the Gurgaon district authorities demolished some dwelling units in Aravali Retreat. The contention of the state and district authorities is that Aravali Retreat is Aravali Gairmumkin Pahad, (Mountain) and that its change to Gairmumkin Farm houses by the district authorities in 1990 is void. They claim that the notification was not applicable to the plot owners because the land had been categorized as farmhouse in the revenue records of the state in 1990.

On 4 April 2013 "Raisina Aravali Retreat Residents Association" (RARRWA) is registered as a society under the Haryana registration and Regulation of Societies. The Aravali Retreat Plot owner's Association denies that the residents violated any environmental laws including Notification dated 7 May 1992. They claim that the notification was not applicable to the plot owners because the land had been categorized as farmhouse in the revenue records of the state in 1990, i.e., prior to the 1992 notification.

In 2014, the National Green Tribunal established on 18.10.2010 under the National Green Tribunal Act 2010 for effective and expeditious disposal of cases relating to environmental protection, in response to illegal constructions in some areas of the Aravali, especially Raisina Hill, Sohna, Gulaphari, Sokandarpur and Wazirabad, in May, directed the Haryana government to identify and submit schedule for demolition of illegal constructions.

In June 2014, RARRWA representatives met Mr. Mann, the District Town Planner, Enforcement. Official of District Town Planner informs President RARRWA that the current problems being faced by some of the Aravali retreat residents and owners is because API, the developers of the Aravali Retreat, failed to submit Taksim and road layout plans in the 1990s when the area was developed.

On 3 July 2014, President, RARRWA, wrote to Sushil Ansal, Chairman, Ansal API, documenting the concern of Aravali retreat owners. These included the sale by API of areas around Nirmal lake and the site office; changes in the ecology of the Nirmal and Sheetal lakes; and illegal felling of trees. The letter also requested Mr Sushil Ansal, to urgently submit the Taksim, and the layout of roads to the Country Planning Department so that relevant records can be brought up to date. The letter demanded that the common assets be handed over to the residents association. The following day, District Town Planner, Enforcement Gurgaon, [HUDA Complex, Sector 14] issued show cause notice to some farm owners for alleged contravention of section 6 and sub section (i) of section 7 of Punjab Scheduled Roads and Controlled Areas restriction of Unregulated Development Act, 1963. The farm owners directed to produce authenticated copies of [a] registration deed [b] Nakal Jamabandi [c] Khasra Girdawri [d] Sajra plan [e] Site Plan [f] Any approval from the competent authority.

On 13 August 2014, President RARRWA wrote to Sushil Ansal, Chairman, Ansal API, reminding him of API's obligations to owners. Letter urges the chairman of API to urgently get the Taksim done in compliance with the requirement of Town and Country Planning Department, Haryana, and hand over the roads in the Aravali Retreat.

In October 2014, Hawa Singh, Patwari, altered existing revenue records of all Aravali Retreat Farm owners, without exception, which showed Bag Bagicha, Makan, to "Gair Mumkin Pahar" which attracts a number of restrictions under the Aravali Notification of 1992.

In February 2015, President Raisina Aravali Retreat Residents Welfare Association, summited a petition to the CM of Haryana containing the legal history of Aravali Retreat.

In March 2015, a delegation of Aravali Retreat Farm Owners, which included several army officers, led by President of Raisina Aravali Retreat Residents Welfare Association, met with T L Satyaprakash, IAS, Deputy Commissioner Gurgaon on 26 March at 10 am at First Floor, Mini Secretariat, to register their complaint on the unauthorized and post facto change in the status of the land in Aravali retreat to "Gair Mumkin Pahar". The DC in response to the written petition and deposition by the delegation ordered the Additional Deputy Commissioner to prepare a "white paper to solve the problems once for all through a committee". During the meeting a senior officials from the DC office said that every time he visited Aravali retreat he found more greenery than before. The delegation was informed that Aravali Retreat as per the latest master plan of Haryana, comes under the zone in which agricultural activities are permitted including construction for taking care of the agricultural and vegetable produce on the farms.

On 24 April 2016, elections were held for the various positions and for the Board of Management of the association. The entire team of office bearers and the Board was elected unopposed by the members of RARRWA. Col (Retd) R.P. Suhag has been elected as the new President of RARRWA.

During the mid 2010s, some farmhouses upgraded their venues as picnic spots under the development scheme of 'farm tourism' by Haryana government. Consequently, the area has attracted a number of visitors, especially from Delhi and the NCR.

In February 2021, authorities from the town of Sohna demolished 15 illegally-built structures in Aravali Retreat, after an order from the National Green Tribunal directed the Haryana government to enforce protection of the Aravali range.

== Facilities and infrastructure ==
In the centre of the project there is a club house, now in a state of neglect. Next to the club house, is the community or the site offices. These are housed in a temporary barrack. Next to community/site office there is experimental orchard with several varieties of citrus fruits. As of July 2014, there were plans of API to sell the common areas such as the community/site office area and areas next to the Sheetal and Nirmal lakes, which the residents association has objected to. Maintenance of infrastructure, including security, green cover, and trees and flowers along the avenues and road side, are by Star Estate Management Ltd, an affiliate of Ansal properties, which charges owners Rs1200 / per acres per month, i.e., Rs 3971 per quarter, including taxes. Permissible construction in the natural conservation zone (NCZ) designated as ecological sensitive zones such as the Aravali Range, is 0.5 per cent of the area, i.e., about 218 square feet for every acre. Out of the 630 lots, 108 lots have built up areas, some of which were demolished on orders of the Gurgaon authorities for building violations.

=== Access road ===
A narrow village road from Badshahpur through Tikli connects Aravali Retreat to the main Gurgaon-Sohna road. Pathway World School, in coordination with the Municipal Corporation of Gurgaon, Haryana State Public Works Department, and Panchayati Raj, has undertaken to assist with the up gradation of this long-neglected road. The work on the road is expected to be completed before the onset of monsoons in 2014.

=== Pathways World School ===
The Pathway World School is a co-ed school which occupies 30 acres (12 ha) of land in the development, with a student body of 1,100. It offers International Baccalaureate program. The school offers extra circular facilities, student hostels, and on site housing for masters and staff. Many day students commute by bus from Delhi and Gurgaon. In August 2014, the School was awarded Platinum rating for its 'Leadership in Energy and Environmental Design' (LEED) by the United States Green Building Council.

== Population ==
The resident population consists of students, teachers, and school staff, of the Pathway School. In addition there is a sizable population of gardeners, shop keepers, security and maintenance staff. The total resident population in the project, including the school, is about 2000.

== Residents Welfare Association ==
The RWA of Aravali Retreat is "Raisina Aravali Retreat Residents Association" (RARRWA), which is registered in Gurgaon, Haryana, under the Haryana Registration and Regulation of Societies Act 2012 (Haryana Act No. 1 of 2012). The aim of the association is 'to promote the welfare of the residents of the colony known as Aravali Retreat". Col (Retd) R.P. Suhag, is the current president of the association. The office address of RARRWA is RARRWA Secretariat, Aravali Retreat, Village Raisina, District Gurgaon. RARRWA also assists plot owners in getting their Girdawaries done.

== Legal issues ==
The development has been the subject of numerous disputes regarding the legality of some structures built on the site. Local and national environmental agencies have embarked on numerous demolition drives to remove structures which have violated environmental laws.

In 2007, the Haryana State Pollution Control, filed charges against API, the developers of Aravali retreat, and some plots owners, for violating the Aravali Notification dated 7 May 1992. The contention of the state and district authorities is that Aravali Retreat is Aravali Gairmumkin Mountain (Pahad), and that its change to Gairmumkin Farm houses by the district authorities in 1990 is void. In support of this contention it is argued that the 1990 order has been revoked by the Collector of Gurgaon on 23 February 2006. The re-categorization of Aravali Retreat by the district authorities as 'Gairmumkin Pahad' (Mountain), was prompted by Haryana State Pollution Control complaint. The developer, in 2012, in his deposition before the court claimed that the relevant permissions including under the provisions of The Punjab Scheduled Roads and Controlled Areas (Restriction of Unregulated Development) Act,1963 and the Haryana Development and Regulation of Urban Areas Act, 1975 were obtained before starting work, that the Director, Town and Country Planning, Haryana, was informed of the status of the development by means of letters dated 14 May 1991, and that the area was developed after it had been declared as Gairmumkin Farm houses in 1990.
