= Chandu, Gurgaon =

Chandu
- Village
- Interactive map of Chandu
- Coordinates: 28.4690305°N 76.9105624°E
- Country: India
- State: Haryana
- Division: Gurgaon division
- District: Gurgaon district

Languages
  - Official: Hindi
- Time zone: UTC+5:30 (IST)
- PIN: 122004
- ISO 3166 code: IN-HR
- Vehicle registration: HR

Chandu is a village in Gurgaon Mandal in Gurgaon District in Haryana State, India. The main language of nearby villages is Ahirvati. Other villages in the area include Sikhohpur.

== Notable residents ==
Pooja Sharma became the first woman in the village to work outside the house. In 2010 they took on a mansion (a haveli) and they began to produce milk. She set up a self-help group with an all-women team after persuading her own husband and the husband's of her employees that this was OK. The women ground grains and cooked food and they sold products. In 2022, Sharma went to Delhi to receive the Nari Shakti Puraskar from the President of India.
