= Garhi Harsaru =

Town in Haryana, India

- Town
- Location in Haryana, India Garhi Harsaru (India)
- Country: India
- State: Haryana
- District: Gurugram

Garhi Harsaru is a town and railway junction in northern Gurugram district, Haryana, India. An inland container depot, Garhi Harsaru ICD, is located near the Garhi Harsaru Junction railway station.

The town lies on the road from Gurugram city to Pataudi town. The village of Dhankot is about 8 kilometres (5.0 mi) from Garhi Harsaru.

History

Garhi is the Hindi word for fortress. Garhi Harsaru is named after Ruler Harsh Dev Singh, one of the 21 sons of Raja Sangat Singh Chauhan ( Ruler of Mandhan near Alwar) who set himself up here in 1360 Vikram Samvat. Raja Sangat was the great-grandson of Chahir Deo, brother of famous King Prithviraj Chauhan. The area under the control of Garhi Harsaru, consisting of 60 villages, was called Dhundhoti.The descendants of the eldest son of Harsh Dev reside in the present day village Harsaru.

"The village is currently affluent, with a population primarily composed of the Yadav caste, represented by the Bhinda, Mehta, and Dagar gotras, along with several other clans."

== Demographics ==
Garhi Harsaru became a census town in 2011.

According to the Census India 2011, it has a population of about 7894 persons of which 4216 are males while 3678 are females living in around 1539 households.

== Industry ==
Historically Garhi Harsaru served the Rajputana–Malwa Railway line. Salt was transported by steam locomotives. The conversion of the railway track from metre gauge to 5 ft 6 in (1,676 mm) broad gauge was completed in 2011.

In recent years, Garhi Harsaru has grown in economic importance due to its proximity to IMT Manesar, as well as its railway junction with inland container depot.

== See also ==
- Dhorka
- Gurgaon
- Jhajjar
- Farrukhnagar
- Haryana
- Indian Railways
- Delhi Sarai Rohilla Railway Station
- Delhi Junction Railway station
- Rewari railway junction
