= Gurgaon Rural =

- Census town
- Location in Haryana, India Gurgaon Rural (India)
- Coordinates: 28°27′24″N 77°01′23″E
- Country: India
- State: Haryana
- District: Gurgaon

Population (2001)
  - Total: 17,100

Languages
  - Official: Hindi
- Time zone: UTC+5:30 (IST)
- ISO 3166 code: IN-HR
- Vehicle registration: HR
- Website: haryana.gov.in

Gurgaon Rural is a census town in Gurgaon district in the Indian state of Haryana.

== Demographics ==
As of 2011 India census, Gurgaon Rural had a population of 17,100+. Males constitute 54% of the population and females 46%. Gurgaon Rural has an average literacy rate of 80.03%, higher than the national average of 74.04%. The place is Under development by Haryana government.
