= Mangwaki =

- village
- Location in Haryana, India Mangwaki (India)
- Coordinates: 28.355989°N 76.679209°E
- Country: India
- State: Haryana
- District: Gurgaon

Languages
  - Official: Hindi
- Time zone: UTC+5:30 (IST)
- PIN: 122 503
- ISO 3166 code: IN-HR
- Vehicle registration: HR
- Website: haryana.gov.in

Gurgaon district in the Indian state of Haryana dominated by Gurjar caste. It is located 42.1 kilometres (26.2 mi) from Gurgaon when accessed through Drive via SH 15A, 50 km Drive via MDR 132 and NH8, 43.7 km Drive via Basai Rd at the foothills of the Aravali hills. It is 26.9 km from Rewari Drive via NH 71.

== See also ==
- Jatauli-Hailey Mandi
- Manesar
- Gurgaon
- Rewari
- Dharuhera
- Nawab of Pataudi
- Pinangwan
- Faridpur
- Mangwaki (Noorgarh)
