= Sukhrali =

- Census town
- Location in Haryana, India Sukhrali (India)
- Coordinates: 28.4827°N 77.055672°E
- Country: India
- State: Haryana
- District: Gurgaon

Population (2001)
  - Total: 10,384

Languages
  - Official: Hindi
- Time zone: UTC+5:30 (IST)
- ISO 3166 code: IN-HR
- Vehicle registration: HR
- Website: haryana.gov.in

Sukhrali is a census town in Gurgaon district in the Indian state of Haryana.

== Demographics ==
As of 2001 India census, Sukhrali had a population of 10,384. Males constitute 54% of the population and females 46%. Sukhrali has an average literacy rate of 78%, higher than the national average of 59.5%: male literacy is 82%, and female literacy is 64%. In Sukhrali, 12% of the population is under 6 years of age.
