= Sarhaul =

Sarhaul (Sarhol)
- Village
- Country: India
- State: Haryana
- Region: North India
- District: Gurgaon

Languages
  - Official: Hindi
- Time zone: UTC+5:30 (IST)
- PIN: 122015
- Vehicle registration: HR
- Website: haryana.gov.in

Sarhaul (Sarhol) is one of the oldest villages in Gurgaon mandal in the Gurgaon District of Haryana state of India. It is inhabited by Ahirs.

== History ==
The village started to form before 1857. When brothers from village Nuni in Haryana had reached the open fields, they had to dug a well and built huts. Began agriculture in the surrounding free lands. The family of those brothers earned respect by resolving disputes within the village and many villages nearby. The biggest permanent house built in the village was made by the Ahir family and this house still exists. During the rule of East India Company, Britisher's visited this village. They helped set up the first school in the village where students from many villages nearby could come and study. They also developed the village to head the ground surrounding 24 smaller villages. Sanjay Gandhi had first decided to start a cheap car factory and selected land belonging to this village and few villages around. The only highway coming from Delhi passed near the village bus stop, today called Sirhaul More. The highway today is called old Delhi road. The ancillaries developed around the factory of Maruti Udyog Limited. Udyog Vihar formed and enveloped the entire village.

== Facilities ==
It has three large water reservoirs. None of them are in use anymore.

== Governmental agency ==
The village till 2010 was governed by Village Panchayat. After first Municipal elections, it was adopted as a municipal ward. Vimal Yadav of Sarhaul village was the first elected mayor of Gurgaon. Rao Dharam Pal Mla of Badshahpur is also from Sarhaul. Its Pin Code is 122015.India.

== Demographics ==
It has a population of about 6938 persons living in around 1432 households. Most of the industrial part like Maruti Udyog Limited is located in the village.

== Employment and industry ==
Sarhaul is a hub for people living and working at the nearby industrial area known as Udyog vihar, sector 18. IT and ITes industries are the primary job source for people living there. Some Yadavs of this village have set up their own business which has met with considerable success like garments, IT, graphics and others.

== University and schools ==
Logokart institute and Design office is located there; they organize the local design carnival. and have a commercial design office here Other colleges and schools:

- Gyandeep Model School
- Sheel Public School
- Rao Shyamlal School

== See also ==
- jats
