= Silokhera =

- Village
- Country: India
- State: Haryana
- District: Gurugram
- Region: North India

Government
  - Type: Municipal Corporation
  - Body: Municipal Corporation, Gurugram

Population
  - Total: 7,715

Languages
  - Official: Hindi, Haryanvi
- Time zone: UTC+5:30 (IST)
- PIN: 122001
- ISO 3166 code: IN-HR
- Vehicle registration: HR-26-XX-XXXX
- Website: haryana.gov.in

Silokhra is a village located in Gurugram city in the Gurugram district of Haryana, India. The village has a population of approximately 7715 individuals residing in around 1831 households. Although there are various castes living in the village, Brahmins make up the most significant demographic.

The farmland surrounding the village has been acquired by developers and transformed into a hub of modern buildings and townships. The Unitech Group has purchased the majority of the village land for a 300-acre residential township consisting of apartments, plots, and private villas. Several notable landmarks, such as the Signature Towers, Crown Plaza, Westin Hotel, Shikshantar School, The World Spa, Uniworld City, and The Palms, are all part of this bustling township.

Sectors 15, Sushantlok, DLF Phase-4, and Sector 29 of Gurgaon were previously part of Silokhra village before being acquired by the Haryana Shahari Vikas Pradhikaran. These areas are now the center of attraction for tourists, as they feature the Kingdom of Dreams, India's first live entertainment theatre, Appu Ghar by Oysters, one of the most popular water parks, and 125 cafes and restaurants.

== History ==
During the early 1800s, when India was under British colonial rule, Silokhra was a part of the Paragana of Badshahpur-Jharsa. This region was ruled by Begum Samru (1753-1836), who constructed a magnificent palace for herself between Badshahpur and Jharsa. Jharsa was the primary cantonment of Begum Samru.

== Location ==
Silokhra is near the HUDA City Centre metro station, South City 1, Sector 31, Sector 40 in the middle of Gurgaon. Located on the 28 acre of land, the village falls under the ward number 32 of Municipal Corporation of Gurgaon (MCG).

== Climate of Silokhra & Election Results ==
Climate data for Silokhera
Month	Jan	Feb	Mar	Apr	May	Jun	Jul	Aug	Sep	Oct	Nov	Dec	Year
Mean daily maximum °F (°C)	70.0 (21.1)	75.6 (24.2)	86.0 (30.0)	97.2 (36.2)	103.3 (39.6)	102.7 (39.3)	95.2 (35.1)	91.9 (33.3)	93.0 (33.9)	91.2 (32.9)	82.9 (28.3)	73.4 (23.0)	88.5 (31.4)
Mean daily minimum °F (°C)	45.1 (7.3)	50.2 (10.1)	59.7 (15.4)	70.7 (21.5)	78.6 (25.9)	82.9 (28.3)	79.9 (26.6)	78.6 (25.9)	75.9 (24.4)	67.1 (19.5)	55.0 (12.8)	46.8 (8.2)	65.8 (18.8)
Average rainfall inches (mm)	0.80 (20.3)	0.59 (15.0)	0.62 (15.8)	0.26 (6.7)	0.69 (17.5)	2.16 (54.9)	9.11 (231.5)	10.19 (258.7)	5.03 (127.8)	1.43 (36.3)	0.20 (5.0)	0.31 (7.8)	31.39 (797.3)
Average rainy days	1.7	1.3	1.2	0.9	1.4	3.6	10.0	11.3	5.4	1.6	0.1	0.6	39.1
Mean monthly sunshine hours	213.9	217.5	238.7	261.0	263.5	198.0	167.4	176.7	219.0	269.7	246.0	217.0	2,688.4

=== 2011 MCG Elections (Ward 29) ===
MCG Gurgaon 2011: WARD-29
Party	Candidate	Votes	%	±%
Independent	Saroj Yadav W/o Satish Yadav	1320		
Independent	Rajbala SharmaW/o Parveen Sharma	1256		
	Other candidates- 9	3774		
Turnout		6,350		

=== 2017 MCG Elections (Ward 32) ===
MCG Gurugram 2017: WARD-32
Party	Candidate	Votes	%	±%
BJP	Arti RaoW/o Anil Yadav	4360		
Independent	Sunita Rani W/o Sajjan Singh	3822		
	Other candidates- 3	2310		
Turnout		10,492		

== See also ==
- Delhi Ridge
- Leopards of Haryana
- Gurugram leopard and deer safari
- List of national parks and wildlife sanctuaries of Haryana
- Badshahpur
- Bandhwari
- Gurugram Airstrip
