= Sikhohpur =

Shikohpur
- Village
- Interactive map of Shikohpur
- Coordinates: 28.367°N 76.977°E
- Country: India
- State: Haryana
- Division: Gurgaon division
- District: Gurgaon district

Languages
  - Official: Hindi
- Time zone: UTC+5:30 (IST)
- PIN: 122004
- ISO 3166 code: IN-HR
- Vehicle registration: HR

'Shikohpur is a village in Gurgaon Mandal in Gurgaon District in Haryana State, India. Other villages in the area include Chandu. Main language of this village is Ahirvati.
