= Badha =

Settlement in India

Badha Sikenderpur Badha
- Village
- Location in Haryana, India Badha (India)
- Coordinates: 28.403386°N 76.942019°E
- Country: India
- State: Haryana
- Region: North India
- District: Gurgaon

Languages
  - Official: Hindi
- Time zone: UTC+5:30 (IST)
- PIN: 122101
- ISO 3166 code: IN-HR
- Vehicle registration: HR-26, 72
- Website: haryana.gov.in

Badha is a village in the Gurgaon mandal of the Indian state of Haryana. Badha is 11.78 kilometres (7.32 mi) from Gurgaon.

Nearby villages include Hayatpur (1.351 km [0.839 mi]), Kankrola (2.633 km [1.636 mi]), Naharpur Kasan (3.15 km [1.96 mi]), Wazirpur (3.211 km [1.995 mi]), Bhangrola (3.228 km [2.006 mi]) and Dhorka (3.696 km [2.297 mi]).
