= Nanukalan =

Village in Haryana State, India

Nanukalan is a village in Pataudi Mandal in Gurgaon District, Haryana State, India. Nanukalan is located 7.250 km from its Mandal Main Town Pataudi. Nanukalan is 35.36 km from its District Main City Gurgaon. It is 273 km from its State Main City Chandigarh.

Nanukalan village has two schools, one for the girls and one higher-secondary school for the boys. It has a population of about 3800 persons living in around 652 households.

Nearby villages are Gadai Pur (1.035 km), Daultabad (1.723 km), Bapas (2.833 km), Khetiawas (4.091 km), Balewa (4.392 km), Pahari (4.514 km), Inchha Puri (4.529 km).

== Schools near by Nanukalan ==
1 . Indian sr.sec.school

2 . Rav Ram Singh Jiwan DAV Senior Secondary School

3 . Ashram Hari Mandir Sanskrit Vidyalaya

4 . GSSS NOORGARH

5. Mahrishi Dyanand sr. sec. school

6. Keshv vidya vihar sr. sec. school

7. Pathfinder international school pataudi

8 GSSS KHOR

9. GSSS NANUKALAN

10.Pataudi Place
