= Kanhai =

- Village
- Nicknames: Kanhaiya, Kanhei
- Location in Haryana, India Kanhai (India)
- Country: India
- State: Haryana
- Region: North India
- District: Gurgaon

Languages
  - Official: Hindi
- Time zone: UTC+5:30 (IST)
- PIN: 122003
- ISO 3166 code: IN-HR
- Vehicle registration: HR-26,72
- Website: haryana.gov.in

Kanhai is a midsize village near Sushant Lok. It lies in Gurgaon mandal of Gurgaon District in the state of Haryana. It lies near Ardee city, sector 45, sector 44 and Sushant lok. Shri Mati Saroj Yadav is the village head (sarpanch). It has a population of about 12 thousand persons living in around 1140 households.

== History ==
The village is as old as Mahabharat times. Guru Draonacharya used to give teaching in this village. Krishna also stayed in Kanhai for some time. It got its name from Krishna as "Kanhaiya", later corrupted to Kanhai.

Kanhai serves as a residential hub for servants and students who work in nearby different companies.

Kanhai also has the biggest church of Gurgaon called the Church of Immaculate Conception, and also has the head office of the electricity company of DHBVN.
