= Hayatpur =

- Village
- Location in Haryana, India Hayatpur (India)
- Coordinates: 28°24′59″N 76°56′10″E
- Country: India
- State: Haryana
- District: Gurgaon
- Elevation: 13 m (43 ft)

Population (2004)
  - Total: 3,872

Languages
  - Official: Hindi
- Time zone: UTC+5:30 (IST)
- PIN: 1
- ISO 3166 code: IN-HR
- Vehicle registration: HR
- Website: haryana.gov.in

Hayatpur is a village in Gurgaon Mandal, Gurgaon District, Haryana State. Hayatpur is 11.22 km distance from its Mandal Main Town Gurgaon. Hayatpur is 10.88 km distance from its District Main City Gurgaon. It has a population of about 3,372 people living in around 652 households as of 2011. Nearby villages are SikanderPur Badha (1.351 km), Badha (1.352 km), Wazirpur (2.282 km), Harsaru (2.948 km), Garhi Harsaru (3.199 km), Kankrola (3.461 km), Dhorka (3.503 km). Hayatpur is located on IMT road crossing Pataudi road, nearby sectors are 89,94,93 and 91.

== See also ==
- Gurgaon
- Haryana
