= Begampur Khatola =

- Village
- Location in Haryana, India Begampur Khatola (India)
- Coordinates: 28.416279°N 77.004671°E
- Country: India
- State: Haryana
- Region: North India
- District: Gurgaon

Languages
  - Official: Hindi
- Time zone: UTC+5:30 (IST)
- PIN: 122101
- ISO 3166 code: IN-HR
- Vehicle registration: HR-26, 72
- Website: haryana.gov.in

Begumpur Khatola is a village in Gurugram Mandal, Gurugram District, in the Indian state of Haryana. It lies on National Highway 8 on Milestone 39 next to Hero Honda Chowk. The village includes sectors 35, 74 and 73, and is surrounded by industrial area Udhyog Vihar Phase 7. The village is surrounded by 3 main highways - NH 8 from west, SPR from south, and Sohna Road from east. It is surrounded by villages Narsinghpur, Khandsa, Darbaripur, Behrampur, and Fazilpur.

Most of the villagers have incomes from either rental residencies, transportation business or general stores. The village has a lot of schools, including three big schools: Lady Florence Public school, Suraj School, and Saraswati Public School. Other schools in the village are DPR Public School, Adarsh Vidya Niketan, and Little Paradise Play School. The village's government school is also up to senior secondary.

Begumpur Khatola's community centre is believed to be biggest of all villages of Gurugram.

== Geography ==
Neighbouring villages include Tikri, Hasanpur, Badshahpur, Palda, Mohammadpur, and Kherki Daula.

== Demography ==
The village is mainly dominated by Rajputs, followed by a few populations of Valmikis, Harijans, and Gujjars.

Rajputs are of Raghav sub-caste but also have Chauhans and Tanwars. The Raghavs settled in the village. A real story can be heard from everyone regarding the settlement of village. Centuries ago, three brothers came from Bhondsi (a nearby village with a Raghav population) to settle their own villages. The eldest settled Badha village, the next one settled Begumpur Khatola village, and the youngest brother settled Khandsa village.

== Administration ==
Begumpur Khatola comes under the Gurugram Lok Sabha seat, Badshahpur Vidhan Sabha seat, and ward no. 26.

Rao Inderjeet is the current MP, the current MLA is Rakesh Daultabad, and the current parshad is Mrs. Praveenlata Rakesh Yadav.

The village's PIN code is 122004.
