= Khandewla =

- village
- Location in Haryana, India Khandewla (India)
- Coordinates: 28°22′58″N 76°46′14″E
- Country: India
- State: Haryana

Languages
  - Official: Hindi
- Time zone: UTC+5:30 (IST)
- ISO 3166 code: IN-HR
- Vehicle registration: HR
- Nearest city: Farukh Nagar
- Website: haryana.gov.in

Khandewla is a village in Farrukh Nagar Mandal, Gurgaon district, Haryana State, India. It is 21 kilometres (13 mi) from the district's main city of Gurgaon. A disaster management system for the village is being established in Hali Mandi.
