= Haileymandi =

Hailymandi
- Town
- Location in Haryana, India Hailymandi (India)
- Coordinates: 28.35125°N 76.75637°E
- Country: India
- State: Haryana
- District: Gurgaon

Languages
  - Official: Hindi
- Time zone: UTC+5:30 (IST)
- ISO 3166 code: IN-HR
- Vehicle registration: HR 76
- Website: haryana.gov.in

Hailymandi is a town and a municipal council in Gurgaon district in the Indian state of Haryana. It was the market town of the erstwhile Pataudi State before Indian independence. Nearby is the temple of 'Baba Hardeva'.

== History ==
As per historical background given in district gazette, in the beginning of the nineteenth century, a British man established a bungalow near the railway station village of Jatauli. Lord Haily from Britain was placed here and was in charge of the area during British Raj. With the passage of time, the commercial activities (Mandi) developed due to the nearness to railway station. The place derives its name from the name of Bungalow i.e. "Haily" and "Mandi". With the passage of time, Mandi has been developed into a major grain market and became the main source of employment of the area.

== Demographics ==
As of 2001 India census, Hailymandi had a population of 17,072. Males constitute 53% of the population and females 47%. Hailymandi has an average literacy rate of 69%, lower than the national average of 74%: male literacy is 89%, and female literacy is 58%. In Hailymandi, 14% of the population is under 6 years of age.
