= Patherheri =

Pathredi
- Village
- Location in Haryana, India Pathredi (India)
- Coordinates: 28.19°N 76.78°E
- Country: India
- State: Haryana
- District: Gurgaon
- Elevation: 240 m (790 ft)

Population (2019)
  - Total: 6,700

Languages
  - Official: Hindi
- Time zone: UTC+5:30 (IST)
- PIN: 122413
- Telephone code: 0124-
- ISO 3166 code: IN-HR
- Vehicle registration: HR 26, HR 38, HR 55
- Sex ratio: 3500:3200 (male:female) ♂/♀
- Website: haryana.gov.in

Patherheri (also known as Pathredi) is a village in Gurgaon district in the Indian state of Haryana. Pathredi was formed in the campaign of British Government. This village is situated 4 kilometres from Bilaspur from the NH-8 on Bilaspur-Tauru Road. Places near Pathredi Sheetal Sadh Mandir and ancient cave famous for Makar Sakranti mela. Prachin Thakur ji Krishna Mandir.

Sheetal Sadh Mandir and prachin Cave

== Geography ==
Patherheri is located at 28.32° N 76.78° E. It has an average elevation of 240 metres (787 feet).

== Demography ==
As of 2019 India census, Patherheri had a population of around 6700. Males constitute 51% of the population and females 49%. Patherheri has an average literacy rate of 67% abovethan the national average of 59.5%: male literacy is 65%, and female literacy is 48%. In Pathredi, 14% of the population is under 6 years of age.

== Economy ==
Patherheri's economy is dominated by agriculture. In agriculture the main crops are wheat, grain (jwar, bajra), mustard.army, police and teaching jobs are other areas where people contribute in the economy. Pathredi village has got 2 govt school and 1 private school.
