= Dundahera =

- Census town
- Location in Haryana, India Dundahera (India)
- Coordinates: 28.51276°N 77.07805°E
- Country: India
- State: Haryana
- District: Gurgaon

Population (2001)
  - Total: 10,640

Ahirwati , Haryanvi
  - Official: Hindi
- Time zone: UTC+5:30 (IST)
- Postal code: 122016
- ISO 3166 code: IN-HR
- Vehicle registration: HR
- Website: haryana.gov.in

Dundahera is a census town in Gurgaon district in the state of Haryana, India. It lies near Udyog Vihar Industrial Area adjacent to Delhi-Gurgaon Border. It has a population of about 122016 persons living in around 2739 households. It is dominated by The Yadav (Ahir) community of Nuniwal and Lamba clans .

== Demographics ==
As of 2001 India census, Dundahera had a population of 10,640. Males constitute 59% of the population and females 41%. Dundahera has an average literacy rate of 76%, higher than the national average of 59.5%: male literacy is 83% and, female literacy is 66%. In Dundahera, 12% of the population is under 6 years of age. The village forms largest chunk of municipal Ward No.4 of Municipal Corporation of Gurgaon. The present Municipal Councillor from this ward is Mr. Virender Yadav who got elected after the electoral process held in April–May, 2011 for the first ever elections of Municipal Corporation of Gurgaon.
