= Virender Singh (wrestler, born 1970) =

Indian wrestler

Personal information
- Nickname: Dheeraj
- Nationality: Indian
- Born: 16 March 1971 (age 55) Jharsa Gurgaon, Haryana
- Height: 172 cm (5 ft 8 in)
- Children: Priyank Thakran

Sport
- Country: India
- Sport: Wrestling
- Event: 74 kg; freestyle
- Club: Guru Hanuman
- Coached by: Guru Hanuman (Dronacharya awardee)
Medal record
Representing India
Men's Freestyle Wrestling
World Championships
Bronze medal – third place	1992 Cali	74 kg
Commonwealth Championship
Silver medal – second place	1995 Melbourne	74 kg
SAF Games
Gold medal – first place	1995 Chennai (IND)	74 kg
- Updated on 29 November 2014

Virender Thakran (born 1970) is a former Indian wrestler. He won a bronze medal in the World Wrestling Championship in 1992 at Cali. He won a silver medal in Commonwealth Championship in 1995 (Senior, 74 kg, Freestyle). He was a Gold Medallist in the South Asian Championship (SAF Games). He is very popular by nickname Dheeraj Pahalwan in the rural tournaments of wrestling.

== Born ==
He was born at village Jharsa near Gurgaon. His father Bharat Singh Thakran was a farmer. His sister Smt. Pritam Rani Siwach was the captain of the Indian women's hockey team. He was fond of wrestling in his early childhood. He had started his practice in Nehru Stadium Gurgaon at the age of 10.

== Career ==
The Haryana state is known as the birthplace of wrestlers in India. There are many wrestlers of Haryana who gave the proud to India in the field of wrestling. His father friend Mr. Hansram Pahalwan gave the suggestion to send him in Guru Hanuman Akhara Delhi because Mr. Hansram was also a pupil of Guru Hanuman in his early age. The Guru Hanuman is the most popular trainer of wrestlers. He had won bronze medal in World Wrestling Championship in 1992 at Cali. He had won silver medal in Commonwealth Championship in 1995 (Senior, 74 kg, Freestyle). He had secured 7th position in World Wrestling Championship in year 1992 (Junior, 74 kg, Freestyle). He also secured 4th position in Commonwealth Championship in the year 1993 (Senior, 74 kg, Freestyle).
