= Pooja Sharma (entrepreneur) =

Indian entrepreneur

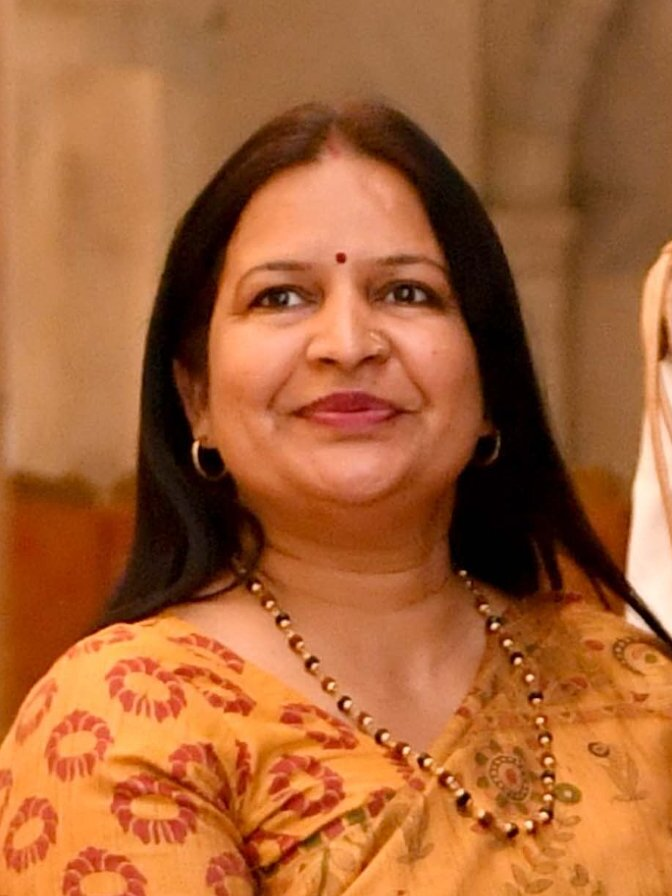
- Sharma in 2022
- Born: c. 1980 (age 45–46)
- Awards: Nari Shakti Puraskar (2022)

Pooja Sharma (born c. 1980) is an Indian entrepreneur. She is the first woman in her village to work outside the home. She set up a self-help group that employs 150 women in a bakery, and has received awards in recognition of her achievements, including the Nari Shakti Puraskar, India's highest civilian honour for women.

== Career ==
Pooja Sharma lives in the village of Chandu, near Gurugram in the Indian state of Haryana. She went to school until the education offered became co-educational, and her parents made her leave school rather than have her educated with boys. She married in 1999. In 2005, Sharma and her family of a husband and three children had financial difficulties, so Sharma became the first woman in the village to work outside the home. She was first employed as a primary school teacher, then in 2010 took on a haveli which was owned by her father-in-law. She bought cows and began to produce milk; when officials from Krishi Vigyan Kendra visited the village, she rejected their idea of learning to sew as unsaleable. She requested training in something marketable and was trained in food production.

With an all-female team, Sharma established Kshitiz, a self-help group, but had to persuade her husband and the husbands of her employees that this would be acceptable. Sharma said that she was the first woman in the village of Chandu to go out to work. She sold dalia (porridge), laddoos, jowar (sorghum) and soy nuts. In 2017, a non-governmental organization helped Sharma set up a bakery, in a mansion believed by some local people to be haunted, that now employs 150 women and supplies Gurugram restaurants with biscuits made from flaxseed, oatmeal and walnut. Sharma has trained over 1,000 women from Haryana.

== Awards and recognition ==
The state government of Haryana presented Sharma with awards for agricultural leadership in 2015, and for farming innovation in the following year. In 2016, the Indian Council of Agricultural Research awarded her both the Pandit Deendayal Upadhyaya Antyodaya Krishi Puraskar and the Innovative Krishi Samman. She received the Nari Shakti Puraskar, India's highest civilian award for women, on International Women's Day 2022.
