= Nurpur Jharsa =

Nurpur Jharsa is a Yadav majority village in Gurgaon tehsil, Gurgaon district, Haryana, India. It is one of 38 villages in Gurgaon Block, along with Aklimpur and Palra. The nearest railway station is at Gurgaon.

Its Pin code is 122101, and postal head office is Badshahpur. The village has approximately 300 houses and a population of about 1,800. It has one primary school and two nursery schools. It has three temples – two dedicated to Lord Shiva and one to Lord Krishna.
