= Kankrola =

- Village
- Location in Haryana, India Kankrola (India)
- Country: India
- State: Haryana
- Region: North India
- District: Gurgaon

Languages haryanvi
  - Official: Hindi
- Time zone: UTC+5:30 (IST)
- PIN: 122101
- ISO 3166 code: IN-HR
- Vehicle registration: HR-26,72
- Website: haryana.gov.in

Kankrola is a village in the Gurgaon District of the Indian state of Haryana. It is located 14.42 kilometres (8.96 mi) from Gurgaon. The village has a population of about 3,357 persons made up of around 595 households.
