= Badshahpur =

Badshapur Badshahpur
- city
- Location in Haryana, India Badshapur (India)
- Country: India
- State: Haryana
- Elevation: 240 m (790 ft)

Population (2001)
  - Total: 16,064

Languages
  - Official: Hindi
- Time zone: UTC+5:30 (IST)
- PIN: 122101
- ISO 3166 code: IN-HR
- Vehicle registration: HR
- Website: haryana.gov.in

Badshapur is one of the 4 sub-division of Gurugram district of Haryana state, situated on the Gurugram-Sohna road (NH-248A). It is named after the Badshahpur Fort, which in turn was the abode of the wife of Mughal Emperor Bahadur Shah Zafar.

== History ==
The history of Badshahpur dates back to medieval times. The paragana of Badshahpur-Jharsa was ruled by Begum Samru (b.1753 – d.1836). It was later under the rule of Bahadur Shah Zafar.

=== Fort Badshahpur ===
Fort Badshahpur was the palace of one of the wives of mughal emperor Bahadur Shah Zafar. The unprotected fort is in ruins and needs restoration. It has been encroached by the people.

=== Begum Samru Place ===
Begum Samru Place at Gurugram lies between Badshahpur-Jharsa. The paragana of Badshahpur-Jharsa was ruled by Begum Samru (b.1753 – d.1836) and she built a palace for herself between Badshahpur and Jharsa. Her palace has been completely lost to encroachments. Palace building is located between Gurgaon and Jharsa village, much of which was used as district collector's residence or camp office. Built in Islamic style, the ruins of this palace survived till about 2008 in Gurgaon.

=== Badshahpur Stepwell ===
Badshahpur Mohanlal Stepwell, built in 1905 by Mohan Lal and currently owned by his grandson Ved Prakash Mangla (c. 2018), is a stepwell on sector road near Sohna Road in Badshahpur in Gurugram. It was built to conserve the water due to the crisis, and also as a source of water for the domesticated animals. Ansal University's Sushant School of Art and Architecture (SSAA) students conducted a research on it in 2005.

The catchment area has been obliterated due to construction and encroachment. The neglected unkempt flies-ridden stepwell is without any protective wall. INTACH had offered to preserve the stepwell and also written to the Government of Haryana to reserve it. INTACH could not preserve it due to lack of agreement on terms with the owner who wants to maintain it himself.

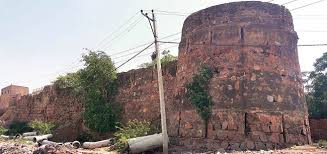
Plundered Badshahpur Qila

In January 2018 SSAA and INTACH discovered that HUDA is in the process of constructing a road which might lead to the destruction of this stepwell. HUDA officials agreed to review it and if needed will alter the road to avoid risk to the stepwell, deputy commissioner assured to have it preserved.

=== Akhara Stepwell ===
Akhara Stepwell, also Akhara Baoli, is a stepwell in inside a functional akhara on the same road as the "Badshahpur Baoli", only few km away, in Badshahpur. Constructed with local materials, such as stone, all these baolis of Gurugram district have mixed Ahir-Rajput-Jat-Mughal architectural style of 18th-20th centuries with Islamic pointed arches and cusped or segmental arches. In 2018, activists filed the case against the church which tried to illegally grab and destroy this legally protected baoli through fraud.

=== Dhumaspur Stepwell ===
Dhumaspur Stepwell, also Dhumaspur Baoli, is a 200 years old Zila Parishad-managed five-story stepwell on the "Jail Road" in Dhumaspur village near Badshahpur in Gurugram. If was built on 2 kanal land from the stones brought from Makrana and Jaipur mines. In 2018, activists filed the case against the church which tried to illegally grab and destroy this legally protected baoli through fraud.

== Assembly constituency ==
Badshapur assembly constituency is dominated by Yadav/Ahir voters which are nearly 45,000 in number. Rakesh Daulatbad is the sitting MLA from Badshahpur. Caste composition of Badshahpur is 45,000 Ahir/Yadavs, 32000 Jats, 20,000 Gujjars, 15,000 Brahmins, 10,000 Rajputs, 11,000 Punjabis and 10,000 Banias 7,000 Prajapati.

Badshahpur is quite a large constituency it includes nurpur jharsa, Manesar, Farrukhnagar, and some urban areas of Gurgaon. Villages under Badshahpur are Palda, Sakatpur, Narsinghpur, Mohammadpur Jharsa, Sadhrana, Garhi, Harsaru, Palam Vihar, Mullaheda, Sector 15 Part 2, Sec - 67, Sec - 68, Gadoli, Naharpur, Rampur, Aklimpur, Kadipur, Sarhaul, Shikohpur, Teekli, sector 10A Daultabad, Dundahera, Wazirpur, Hamirpur, Jhund Sarai, Dhanawas, Dhorka, Bhawani Enclave, Dhana Manesar, Saidpur, Mohammadpur, Patli, Bhangrola, kankrola, hayatpur, Judola, Narsighpur, Nurpur, Baskusla Manesar, Chandan Nagar Dhani, Basai Enclave, Sikandarpur Ghosi, Nathupur, DLF Phase 3, Rail Vihar, Sector 57, Greenwood City Sector 45, Tigra, Darbaripur, Hasanpur, Begampur Khatola, DLF Phase 2, Dankot, Ikbal Pur, Kaliyawas, Sultanpur, Sikandarpur Ghosi, Darbaripur, Khandsa, Islampur, Jharsa, Nathupur, Palam Vihar, Ramgarh and Kherki Daula all significant landmarks of Gurgaon city fall under Badshapur assembly constituency.
