= Wazirabad, Gurgaon =

Padheni, Tauru
- Village
- Interactive map of Padheni, Tauru
- Country: India
- State: Haryana
- Region: North India
- District: Gurgaon district

Population
  - Total: 7,653
  - Rank: 16

Languages
  - Official: Hindi
- Time zone: UTC+5:30 (IST)
- PIN: 122003
- ISO 3166 code: IN-HR
- Vehicle registration: HR
- Website: haryana.gov.in

Wazirabad is a large village in Gurgaon district Haryana state, India. It lies on the Gurgaon-Faridabad road. It has a population of about 8279 persons living in around 1461 households. The village is spread over three wards under the Municipal Corporation of Gurgaon: wards 30, 31 and 33. Sector 52, 52A, 53, 56, 57 and Ardee city also comes under Wazirabad; its Pin code is 122003.

Majority of village land was purchased by DLF Limited, Haryana Industrial and Infrastructure Development Corporation (HSIIDC) and Haryana Urban Development Authority (HUDA). The village made news in 2010, when it came open that 350 acres of prime land in the village, acquired from the panchayat, was sold for Rs. 17 billion to developer DLF Limited for development of a recreation and leisure park. The village is dominated by the people of Yadav community.

== 2012 High court order ==
The Punjab and Haryana high court has restrained Delhi Land and Finance (DLF) developers from carrying out any construction activity on around 278 acres of land in Wazirabad village and also from creating any third party rights. The construction company is coming up with Golf Villas at the site by the project name 'Magnolias'.
