= Tigra (gaon) =

Coordinates: 24°53′N 79°23′E

Tighra is a mid-sized village located in the district of Gurgaon in the state of Haryana in India. It has a population of about 5000 persons living in around 1000 households.

== See also ==
- Brahmin
- Gujjars
- Tanwars
- Gurgaon
- Haryana
