= Dhirendra Brahmachari =

Indian yoga mentor (1924–1994)

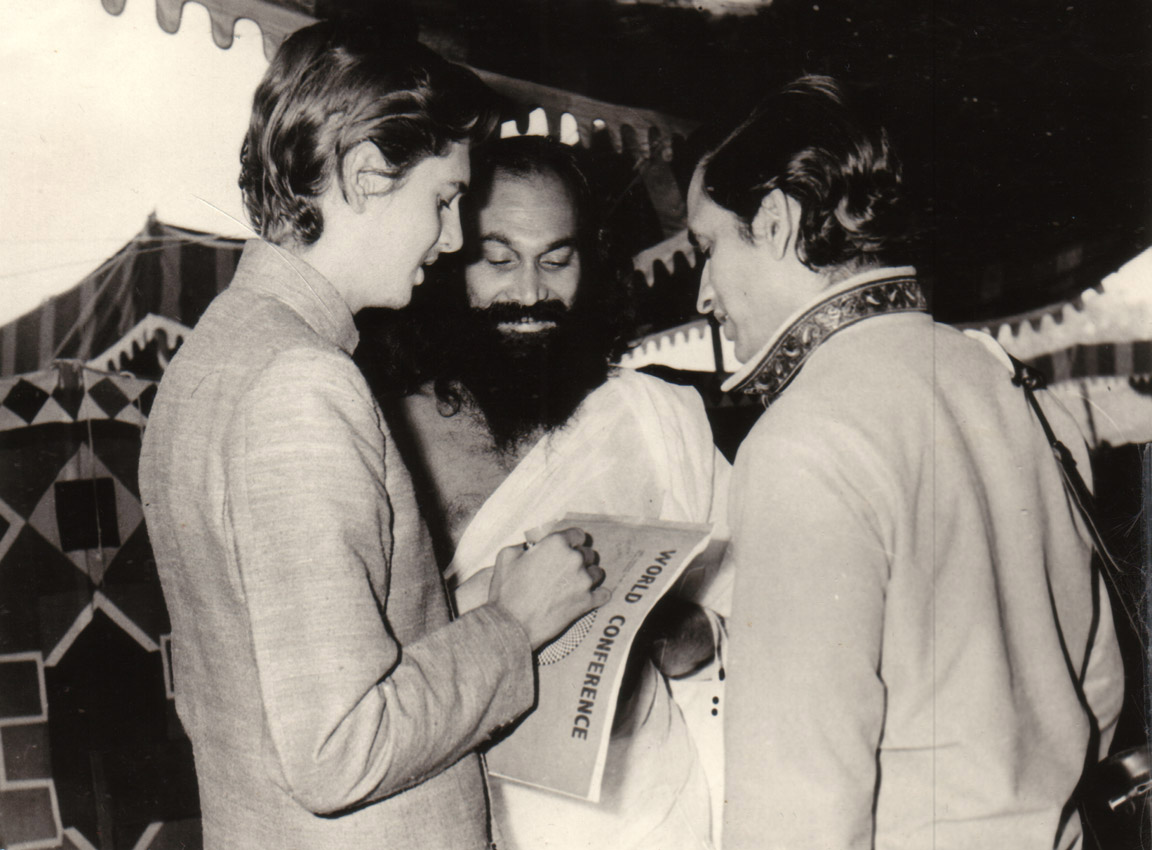
- John Hills discusses the World Conference on Scientific Yoga Conference program schedule with Dhirendra Brahmachari and Amrit Desai
- Born: Dhirendra Choudhary; 12 February 1924; Basaith Chanpura, Bihar and Orissa Province, British India (present day Madhubani, Bihar, India)
- Died: 9 June 1994 (aged 70); Mantalai, Udhampur, Jammu and Kashmir, India
- Occupation: Yoga Guru
- Known for: Yoga mentor of Indira Gandhi

Dhirendra Brahmachari (born Dhirendra Choudhary; 12 February 1924 – 9 June 1994) was an Indian yoga teacher of Yogi Bhajan who taught Kundalini Yoga in the Western world and founded 3HO. Dhirendra Brahmachari was also yoga mentor of Indira Gandhi –The former prime minister of India He ran ashrams in Bhondsi (Gurugram in Delhi NCR), Jammu, Katra and Mantalai (near Sudhmahadev in Udhampur district of Jammu and Kashmir) and wrote books on yoga.

== Biography ==
He was born in a Maithil Brahmin family He later got inspired by reading the Bhagavad Gita, he left home at the age of thirteen and went to Varanasi. His guru was Maharshi Kartikeya whose ashram was at Gopal-Khera, about twelve miles from Lucknow. Dhirendra Brahmachari studied yoga and associated subjects there. In the 1960s, he was invited to travel to the Soviet Union as a hatha yoga expert to train Soviet cosmonauts. Jawaharlal Nehru later invited him to teach yoga to his daughter, Indira Gandhi, to improve her health. He is said to have guided Mrs. Gandhi's vision and ideas. He became influential politically in 1975–77 when Mrs Gandhi dissolved Parliament, declared a state of emergency and suspended civil liberties.

In the late 1970s, Dhirendra Brahmachari promoted the benefits of yoga in a weekly program called Yogabhyaas which was broadcast on Doordarshan, the state-owned television network. He introduced yoga as a subject of study in Delhi administered schools, a considerable innovation.

== Ashrams ==
During 1980s, Brahmachari built Aparna Ashram Society in Gurgaon (now Gurugram) near Silokhera village, in Haryana. The air conditioned Ashram included an airstrip, hangar and a TV studio. Indira Gandhi use to visit Brahmachari here once a week. The 1980s teleserials India Quiz and Hum Log (ran from July 1984 to 17 December 1985) were shot here. Brahmachari charged INR25,000 per shift for the use of ashram's TV studio facilities here for the shooting of Hum Log. In 1983, Brahmachari had written letter to then Chief Minister of Haryana, Bhajan Lal, with a request to acquire 5,000 acre land around Aravalli Range, potentially up to 70,000 acres in total, to build facilities to rival Disneyland, including a yoga research and training centre, a wildlife sanctuary, folk arts and crafts centre, amusement centre and other facilities such as helipad, aquarium, planetarium and games and thrillers. After the guru's death, his relatives and a tenant engaged in a legal battle over the ownership of the property. The aircraft hangar still has two ruined aircraft belonging to Brahmachari

He was the owner of Vishwayatan Yogashram in the centre of Delhi, now known as the Morarji Desai National Institute of Yoga. He also owned campuses in Jammu, Katra and Mantalai, plots of land he had received through his Indira Gandhi clout. Known as "the Flying Swami", he not only helped her form decisions and make appointments, but he also executed some of her orders.

He wrote books on yoga in Hindi and English including 'Yogic Sukshma Vyayama' and 'Yogasana Vijnana'. His ashram at Mantalai is spread over 1008 kanals of land with private airstrips, hangar, a zoo and a seven storey building in gandhi nagar, Jammu.

Nowadays there are five known successors of Dhirendra Brahmachari yoga tradition: Bal Mukund Singh from India, Reinhard Gammenthaler from Switzerland.

== Criminal charges ==
Dhirendra was charged with buying an aircraft in the United States during the Emergency imposed by then Prime Minister Indira Gandhi and smuggling it into the country without paying customs duties, but he was never tried. Dozens of other criminal cases were filed against him and many dragged on till his death. In one case, he was accused of illegally importing gun parts from Spain for his factory, which had a licence to make guns only with local materials.

== Death ==
Dhirendra Brahmachari died in a plane crash, along with his pilot, when they hit a pine tree on 9 June 1994, while landing at the airstrip of his religious retreat and yoga school in Mantalai, a village in Chenani Tehsil in Udhampur district of Jammu and Kashmir (state).
