= Palda =

- Census town
- Location in Madhya Pradesh, India Palda (India)
- Coordinates: 22°41′16″N 75°54′2″E
- Country: India
- State: Madhya Pradesh
- District: Indore

Population (2011)
  - Total: 18,697

Languages
  - Official: Hindi
- Time zone: UTC+5:30 (IST)
- ISO 3166 code: IN-MP
- Vehicle registration: MP

Palda is a census town in Indore district in the Indian state of Madhya Pradesh.

== Demographics ==
As of the 2011 Census of India, Palda is a Census Town in Indore district. The Palda Census Town has a population of 18,697 of which 9,934 are males while 8,763 are females as per report released by Census India 2011.

The population of children aged 0-6 is 2,903 which is 15.53% of total population of Palda. In Palda, the female sex ratio is 882 against state average of 931. Moreover, the child sex ratio in Palda is around 950 compared to Madhya Pradesh state average of 918. The literacy rate of Palda city is 74.19% higher than the state average of 69.32%. In Palda, male literacy is around 81.59% while the female literacy rate is 65.70%.

Palda Census Town has total administration over 3,910 houses to which it supplies basic amenities like water and sewerage. It is also authorize to build roads within Palda Census Town limits and impose taxes on properties coming under its jurisdiction.
