= Nathupur =

Coordinates: 29°47′N 78°38′E

Nathupur is a large village located in the district of Gurgaon in the state of Haryana, India.
