= Samaspur =

Indian village

Samaspur is a midsize village in the middle of Sector 51 in the Gurgaon district of the Indian state of Haryana. It has a population of about 1850 persons living in around 348 households.

It is a well planned and the first model village of the country set up by India's first Prime Minister, Jawaharlal Nehru and inaugurated by Harold Macmillan, the UK Prime Minister at the time. It has wide paved streets laid into rectangular pattern. The houses of the village are airy and have open spaces in front of them. The village has several large developed parks which provide open space for the children to play, elders to walk and women to relax. The village has well laid out sewage and drainage system, there are no open drains in the village.

The Major Caste in the Village is Yadav, with a significant SC/Jatav presence. The Yadavs hailing from near by village "Tikli" migrated to Samaspur before it was established as modern village. They owned the majority of land and established the residence. The families had agricultural land surrounding the village. These few families donated a lot of land to other families to establish the colony. Later the proposal to remodel the village as "first model village" was adopted.

The First Head of the Village was Prithvipal Singh Yadav who devoted his life in agriculture, and in the service of the Village people, his family has a major influence in the village . He has three brothers, the elder on is a Renowned Geography Professor

The land of the village was purchased by a private builder, The Mayfield Gardern, and the rest of it was acquired by HUDA in 1990. On a piece of HUDA land, the Haryana Government have built a commerce and science college which is likely to start functioning from April–May 2016.

The village has a government co-educational middle school and a private school.

Nearby villages

The village Shamaspur is surrounded by Wazirabad in the East (1 km), Kanhai in the North (1 km), Jharsa in the West (1.5 km), Tighra in the South East (0.9 km), Badshapur in the South (2.5 km).
