= Babupur =

- Village
- Location in Haryana, India Babupur (India)
- Coordinates: 28.509317°N 76.988159°E
- Country: India
- State: Haryana
- District: Gurgaon

Languages
- Time zone: UTC+5:30 (IST)
- PIN: 122001
- ISO 3166 code: IN-HR
- Vehicle registration: HR-26, 72
- Website: haryana.gov.in

Babupur is a village in Gurgaon Mandal, near sun in Haryana. Babupur is 12 km from its district main city Gurgaon near Palam Vihar and 252 km from its state main city Chandigarh. It has a population of about 953 persons living in around 185 households.Yadavs are the Dominant Landowning community in this village.

== Geography ==
It belongs to the Gurgaon division. It is located 8 km to the north of district headquarters Gurgaon, 12 km from Gurgaon, and 289 km from state capital Chandigarh.

Sector 106 (1 km), Sector 109 (1 km), Sector 108 (1 km), Daulatabad (1 km), and Vishnu Garden (2 km) are the nearby villages to Babupur. Babupur is surrounded by South West Delhi Tehsil to the east, West Delhi Tehsil to the north, Farrukh Nagar Tehsil to the west, and Bahadurgarh Tehsil to the north.

Gurgaon, Bahadurgarh, Delhi, Sohna are the nearby cities to Babupur.

This place is in the border of the Gurgaon District and South West Delhi district. South West Delhi District South West Delhi is east towards this place. It is near to the Delhi state border.

== Transport ==
=== Rail ===
Gurgaon railway station and Basai Dhankot railway station are the nearest railways station to Babupur with New Delhi Railway Station 29 kilometres (18 mi) away. Now it is on new Dwarka Gurgaon Expressway.

Pincodes

122215 ( ), 122003 (Gurgaon Sector 45), 122015 (Palam Road)

== See also ==
- Sihi
