= Nawada Fatehpur =

Coordinates: 28°24′N 76°56′E

Nawada Fatehpur is a mid-sized village located in the district of Gurgaon in the state of Haryana in India. It has a population of about 4590 persons in around 812 households.

Nawada is a village on the NH-8 through Gurgaon. Nearby sectors include 86, 82, 81 and 87. It is also a major industrial hub, home to companies such as Minda Industries and Mindarika Pvt Ltd. Shishu Kalyan High School is also located in Nawada. Dwarka Expressway is just 3.5 km away and IGI Airport is just 25 km. Upcoming RRTS project is located nearby. Metro projects are underway. Sliver Streak Hospital at 500m, Arvy Hospital at 3 km and Gurugram University is 1.5 km from Nawada.
