= Daultabad, Uttar Pradesh =

Village in Uttar Pradesh, India

Coordinates: 29°27′N 78°21′E

Daultabad or Daulatabad is a panchayat village in Kiraoli Tehsil of Agra district. This village is surrounded by three towns viz Kiraoli, Acchhnera and Fatehpur Sikri. Administratively it is a Village Panchayat (Code: 39048) under Fatehpur Sikri, and includes the three villages of Daulatabad, Naya Bass and Baseri Sikander. Sisodia Thakurs live in these villages. It is 30 km from Agra and 25 km from Bharatpur.

The village has a 32 kV substation. The village is situated near a canal which is the main source of irrigation.
