= Dhorka =

Dhoka
- Village
- Location in Haryana, India Dhoka (India)
- Country: India
- State: Haryana
- Region: North India
- District: Gurgaon

Languages
  - Official: Hindi
- Time zone: UTC+5:30 (IST)
- PIN: 122101
- ISO 3166 code: IN-HR
- Vehicle registration: HR-26, 72
- Website: haryana.gov.in

Dhorka is a village in Gurgaon district and the eponymous tehsil in the Indian state of Haryana. It is one of 38 villages in Gurgaon Block. Garhi Harsaru and Patli railway stations are nearby. The larger Faridabad Station is 44 kilometres (27 mi) away.

Dhorka is surrounded by Gurgaon Tehsil (east), Pataudi Tehsil (west), Taoru Tehsil (south).
