= Aklimpur =

- Village
- Location in Haryana, India Aklimpur (India)
- Coordinates: 28.3602765°N 77.0382428°E
- Country: India
- State: Haryana
- Region: North India
- District: Gurgaon
- Established: year 1829
- Founder: Deva Ram Bhardwaj

Languages
  - Haryanvi Official: Hindi
- Time zone: UTC+5:30 (IST)
- PIN: 122101
- ISO 3166 code: IN-HR
- Vehicle registration: HR
- Website: haryana.gov.in

Aklimpur is a village in the Sohna Block of the Gurgaon District in the state of Haryana, India. It is located near Teekli village in the same block, and the two are connected by the Teekli-Aklimpur road. Deva Ram Bhardwaj founded Aklimpur in 1829. It has a population of about 1,466, living in around 250 households.

It is located at a distance of approximately 13km from Delhi, the national capital.

== Education and employment ==
Local people work in the government sector and industries like banking, education, defense services, police, politics, and science. More than 95% of the village's population is educated and lives a healthy lifestyle.

Many personalities from Aklimpur have made the country proud. People like Dr. Ajay Vashisht, son of Shri Ramkishan Vashisht, the Director of Proteomics at Inception Therapeutics in San Diego, California, United States are at higher posts.

In Aklimpur, Late Shree Shanti Prakash Vashisht, S/o Late Shr Hari Ram Vashisht went on to become a Senior Sanitation Officer in AIIMS, New Delhi. He was a renowned social figure who helped countless people across the country in attaining healthcare at AIIMS. His two sons Deepak Vashisht and Jyoti Vashisht have followed his similar footsteps and are working in AIIMS, New Delhi.

== Politics ==
The current sarpanch of the village is Sudhanshu Bharadwaj.

== Airport ==
The nearest airport is Indira Gandhi International Airport 40 kilometres (25 mi) from Aklimpur.

== Schools ==
- Govt. Secondary School Aklimpur.
- Udeya Bharti Public School.

== Artists and Social Workers ==
Artists like HP Vashisth, Tony Aklimpur, Tushar S Gautam (The Dream Hacker (youtube)), and Akash Bhardwaj have been working by writing and singing Haryanvi and religious songs.

Social workers like Robin Bhardwaj (current member of panchayat), and Manish Vashisht are running a Gau Seva Dal.
