= Bajghera =

- Village
- Location in Haryana, India Bajghera (India)
- Coordinates: 28.532353°N 77.012932°E
- Country: India
- State: Haryana
- Region: North India
- District: Gurgaon

Languages
  - Official: Hindi
- Time zone: UTC+5:30 (IST)
- PIN: 122017
- ISO 3166 code: IN-HR
- Vehicle registration: HR
- Website: haryana.gov.in

Bajghera is a village and rapidly urbanizing locality in the Gurugram district of Haryana, India. Situated on the strategic Delhi-Haryana border, the village has become a primary focal point for the expansion of the National Capital Region (NCR), due to the South Dwarka urban corridor.

== Geography ==
Bajghera is situated approximately 9 km from Gurugram city center and is bordered by Palam Vihar and Mullahera (Sector 22). The village is located adjacent to the Dwarka Expressway (Northern Peripheral Road) and the Sahibi River (Najafgarh Drain) banks. From the north it is bordered by Dwarka and Bharthal in Delhi.

== Development ==
In recent years, the Haryana Shahri Vikas Pradhikaran (HSVP, formerly HUDA) acquired over 800 acres of land in and around Bajghera to facilitate the development of new residential and commercial sectors. This acquisition is part of the larger urban planning initiative to establish the South Dwarka corridor, which integrates Bajghera into Sectors 112, 113, 114, and 115. These sectors are being developed as a high-density transit-oriented zone connecting Delhi's Dwarka sub-city with Gurugram.

== Infrastructure ==
The village is served by the 122017 PIN code and is a key node for local transit between New Palam Vihar and the Delhi border. The area has seen a rapid shift from agricultural land use to luxury residential projects and commercial hubs due to its proximity to the Indira Gandhi International Airport and the upcoming Global City project, with Bajghera being developed as South Dwarka, like a southward extension of the Dwarka Subcity of Delhi.

== Connectivity ==
South Dwarka lies on the western side of the Dwarka Expressway, on the northern side of the expressway.

South Dwarka does not have direct metro connectivity yet.

- South Dwarka is ~5km from the Yashobhoomi Dwarka Sector - 25 metro station on the Airport Express Line.
- South Dwarka is ~7km from the Dwarka Sector 21 metro station on the Airport Express Line and the terminal of Blue Line.
- Plans for the expansion of the Airport Express Line include a stop at South Dwarka in Sector 114.

== See also ==
- Jats
- Hindus
- Gurgaon
- Haryana
