= Sakatpur =

Sakatpur is a village in Kiraoli Tehsil of Agra District of Uttar Pradesh in India.
