= Chakkarpur =

- Village
- Location in Haryana, India Chakkarpur (India)
- Coordinates: 28.45645°N 77.0032°E
- india Country: India
- State: Haryana
- Region: North India
- District: Gurgaon

Population (12/05/2019)
  - Total: 10,000

Languages
  - Official: Ahirwati . Hindi
- Time zone: UTC+5:30 (IST)
- PIN: 122009 122002
- ISO 3166 code: IN-HR
- Vehicle registration: HR
- Website: haryana.gov.in

Chakkarpur is a large village located in Sector 28 of Gurugram, Haryana, India, along the Mehrauli–Gurugram Road. Known for its peaceful environment, the village is predominantly inhabited by members of the Yadav(Gotra Nuniwal) community. It has an estimated population of around 10,000 residents, living across approximately 4,589 households.

The village started its journey sometime in the late 1700s to early 1800s, when four brothers from village Luni, now Nashibpur in Narnaul, Mahendargarh district of Haryana, settled in the foothills of the Aravali Range. Those four brothers will later form the villages now known as Chakkarpur, Sarhaul, Mulehera, and Dundahera. All of them share the same caste ‘Yadav’ and the same sub caste (gotra) ‘Nuniwal’.

Historically, the villagers began cultivating the surrounding free lands, working tirelessly to transform the once-barren terrain into fertile agricultural fields. Chakkarpur is notable for its three oldest havelis (traditional residential structures), which date back to the 1800s. These havelis played a central role in the village’s social structure and eventually led to its division into three distinct sections, or pattis, known as Tehai, Saraoji, and Dhafa.

Chakkarpur is known for its strong sense of unity with nearby villages. Located in Ward No. 32 of Gurgaon Nagar Nigam, its land extends across Sectors 27, 28, 42, and 43, as well as DLF Phase 1, DLF Phase 4, and the initial stretch of Golf Course Road—all developed on land originally belonging to the village. The original inhabitants are Ahirs or Yadavs, often respectfully referred to as Raosahab. Traditionally, the primary occupations of the households were farming, dairy production, and distribution.

Many young men from the village have proudly served the nation in World War I, World War II, and even joined the Azad Hind Fauj under Subhash Chandra Bose. Among them, Subedar Deegram Yadav of the Tehai patti was sent to Singapore during World War II and returned nearly seven years later, alongside several other villagers who shared similar experiences of wartime service.

The village had the largest number of Government Employees in nearby villages at one point in time.

Life in Chakkarpur was once challenging, as most residents had to balance regular jobs with farming to make a living. By the 2000s, Gurugram was experiencing rapid urban growth, attracting people from states such as West Bengal, Bihar, Rajasthan, and Uttar Pradesh. Many moved to Chakkarpur for its well-known paying guest (PG) accommodations, which became a preferred choice for newcomers to the city.

Today, Chakkarpur’s households generate some of the highest rental incomes among both urban and rural villages in the region.

Strategically located near the MG Road Metro Station, Chakkarpur includes several upscale condominiums such as Sahara Grace, Silverglades, Laburnum, Essel Towers, Heritage City, Hamilton Court, MLA Flats, and Ridgewood Apartments. Its territory also hosts major shopping destinations, including Sahara Mall, MGF Metropolitan Mall, PVR Mega Mall, DLF Grand Mall, PVR City Centre Mall, Vipul Agora Mall, JMD Empire Mall, and Global Foyer Mall.
