= Sohna =

- Town
- Location in Haryana, India Sohna (India)
- Coordinates: 28.25°N 77.07°E
- Country: India
- State: Haryana
- District: Gurugram

Government
  - Type: Municipal Council
  - Body: Municipal Council of Sohna (Gurugram)

Area
  - Total: 7.2 km^{2} (2.8 sq mi)
- Elevation: 242 m (794 ft)

Population (2019)
  - Total: 53,962
  - Density: 7,500/km^{2} (19,000/sq mi)

Languages
  - Official: Hindi
  - Spoken: Haryanvi, Ahirwati
- Time zone: UTC+5:30 (IST)
- PIN: 122103
- Vehicle registration: HR72
- Website: haryana.gov.in

Sohna is a town and a municipal council in the Gurugram district of Haryana, India. A popular tourist weekend and conference retreat, it is on the highway from Gurugram to Alwar near a vertical rock. Sohna is known for its hot springs and Shiva temple. Major communities in Sohna are Ahi, Gujjars, Jats, Thakurs and Muslims. Gurugram district is divided into 4 sub-divisions each headed by a Sub-Divisional Magistrate (SDM): Gurugram, Sohna, Pataudi and Badshahpur.

== History ==
=== Founding of the city ===
Sohna, which, according to historical records, traces its origin from 11th century onward, was occupied by three races in succession: namely the Kambhos, the Khanzadas and the Rajputs. The Haryana State Gazetteer records that “the town of Sohna is mentioned to be an ancient Chauhan Rajput settlement,” describing its establishment during the medieval period following regional invasions. Gazetteers mention that Nawab Qutb Khan Khanzada captured the town in 1570 from the Kambhos. They were then expelled in 1620 by the Sisodia Rajputs. The Rajputs migrated to Sohna, who according to myths, obeyed the orders their patron saint who appeared in their dream indicating Sohna as their place of settlement.

=== Monuments ===
==== Sohna hotspring ====
Sohna hotsprings, in the foothills of the Aravalis, also has an ancient Shiva temple. The temple was built by the Baba lakhi shah Banjara Banjara. A Gangasnan mela (fair) is held each November at the temple, and a fair is held each July and August to celebrate Teej. The hot springs in the temple are strongly sulphurous, and their temperature varies from 46 to 51.7 °C (114.8 to 125.1 °F). According to legend, Arjun (one of the five Pandav brothers) dug the wells when he was thirsty. Sohna is believed to have been the abode of hermits and the main kund (tank), Shiva Kund, is said to have medicinal properties. Devotees consider it sacred, and during eclipses and Somavati Amavasya they gather here to bathe in the water. The hilltop Barbet Resort, operated by Haryana Tourism, has sauna and steam-bath facilities, a small swimming pool, a park, lodging and a restaurant overlooking the town.

==== Lake ====
Damdama Lake, known for its boating and picturesque surroundings, was created by building a weir on the South Delhi Ridge between Gurugram and Sohna. It lies in the Northern Aravalli leopard and wildlife corridor.

==== Mosque ====
Gora Barak Mosque has a minaret (khamba in Hindi). The Quto Khan ki Masjid, built from local red sandstone, is in ruins. The Shah Nazam al haq Tomb is claimed to be built over a Hindu temple. The tomb has an inscription dating it to 1461, during the reign of Bahlul Khan Lodi of the Lodi dynasty of the Delhi Sultanate. Material from the Hindu temple was used to build the tomb. It stands on a high platform with stone steps on one side leading to the entrance, inside which is a pillared hall. Decorative features include inscriptions in Arabic, pointed Islamic arches and floral patterns. Educator Syed Ahmad Khan's grandfather is buried here, and notable Muslims were buried in the tomb complex of their favorite Sufi pirs.

==== Gumbaz ====
Lal Gumbaz of Sohna (Red Dome) and Kala Gumbaz of Sohna (Black dome) are west of the town. The 400-year-old tomb called Lal Gumbad is located in the vicinity of Ansal's Orchid Estate. It is made entirely of stone, the structure has a 12-pillared (barakhamba) hall in the entrance arcade that is made of red sandstone crowned with a dome. Attached behind this is the main tomb in stone masonry with a larger dome, exhibiting hybrid architectural styles from Tughlaq and Lodhi periods.

In 2025, Haryana government announced a INR 95 crore restoration plan for upgrade of 20 monuments across the state including the Lal Gumbad at Sohna.

==== Dargah ====
Nazam-ul-Haq dargah was built in 1461 during Lodi dynasty rule of Bahlul Lodi, likely by Khanzada Rajputs.

== Demographics ==
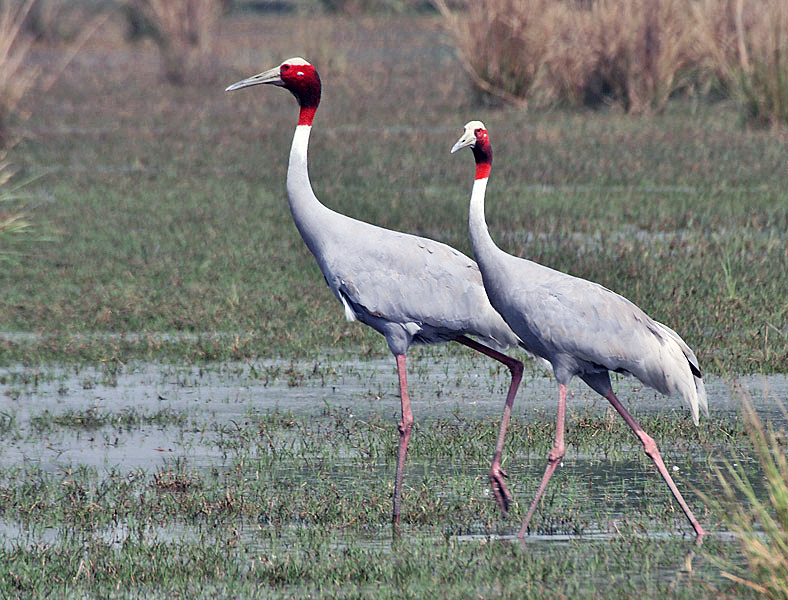
Sarus cranes at Sultanpur National Park.

In the 2001 India census, Sohna had a population of 27,571. Males were 53 percent of the population, and females 47 percent. Sohna has a literacy rate of 63 percent, higher than the national average of 59.5 percent. Male literacy is 70 percent, and female literacy 54 percent. Seventeen percent of the population is under age six. Kunwar Sanjay Singh of the (BJP) Bharatiya Janata Party is the MLA for Sohna.

Religion in Sohna City
| Religion | Population (1911) | Percentage (1911) |
|---|---|---|
| Hinduism | 2,942 | 57.26% |
| Islam | 2,179 | 42.41% |
| Christianity | 15 | 0.29% |
| Sikhism | 1 | 0.02% |
| Others (Note: Including Jainism, Buddhism, Zoroastrianism, Judaism, others, or not stated) | 1 | 0.02% |
| Total Population | 5,138 | 100% |

== Economy ==
=== Rojka Meo industrial estate ===
The Rojka Meo industrial area in Raisika village to the south of Sohna, is a 400-acre (160 ha) industrial area with 379 plots. It falls on NH-248A in the influence zone of, Western Dedicated Freight Corridor and Western Peripheral Expressway and also lies in NCR region.

=== Infrastructure ===
The Haryana government has drawn up a South Gurgaon Master Plan 2031, which will regulate housing. Western Dedicated Freight Corridor Passes through Sohna in Nuh District.

=== Real estate development ===
A master plan for the town was introduced in 2012. Divided into 38 sectors, the plan covers residential, commercial, institutional, industrial, transport, communications, utilities, public and semi-public use, open spaces and agricultural and conservation zones.

== See also ==
- Delhi Ridge
- Leopards of Haryana
- List of national parks and wildlife sanctuaries of Haryana
- Taoru
- Faridabad
