= Gurgaon district =

Coordinates: 28°15′N 77°10′E

- District
- Gurugram district
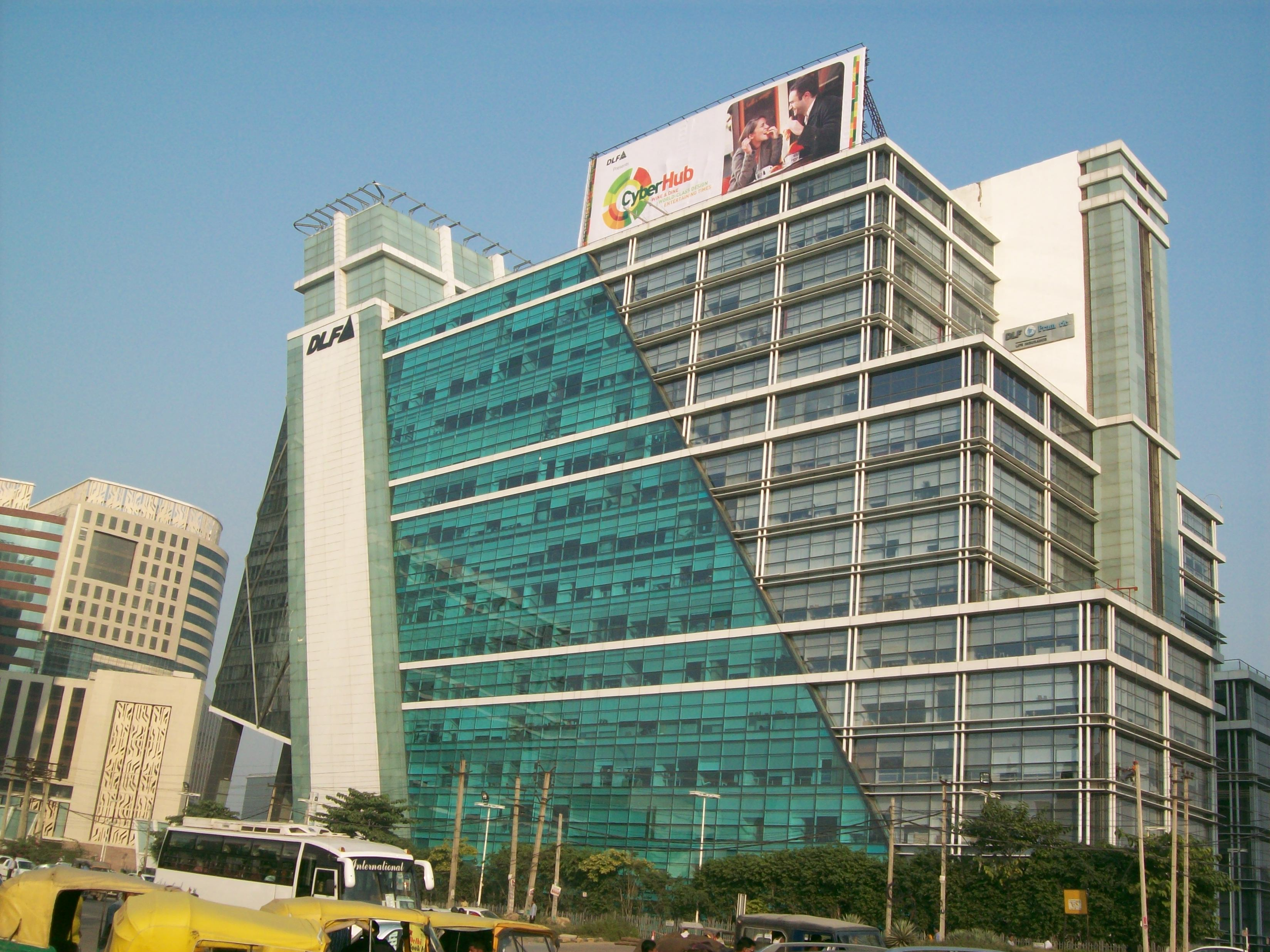
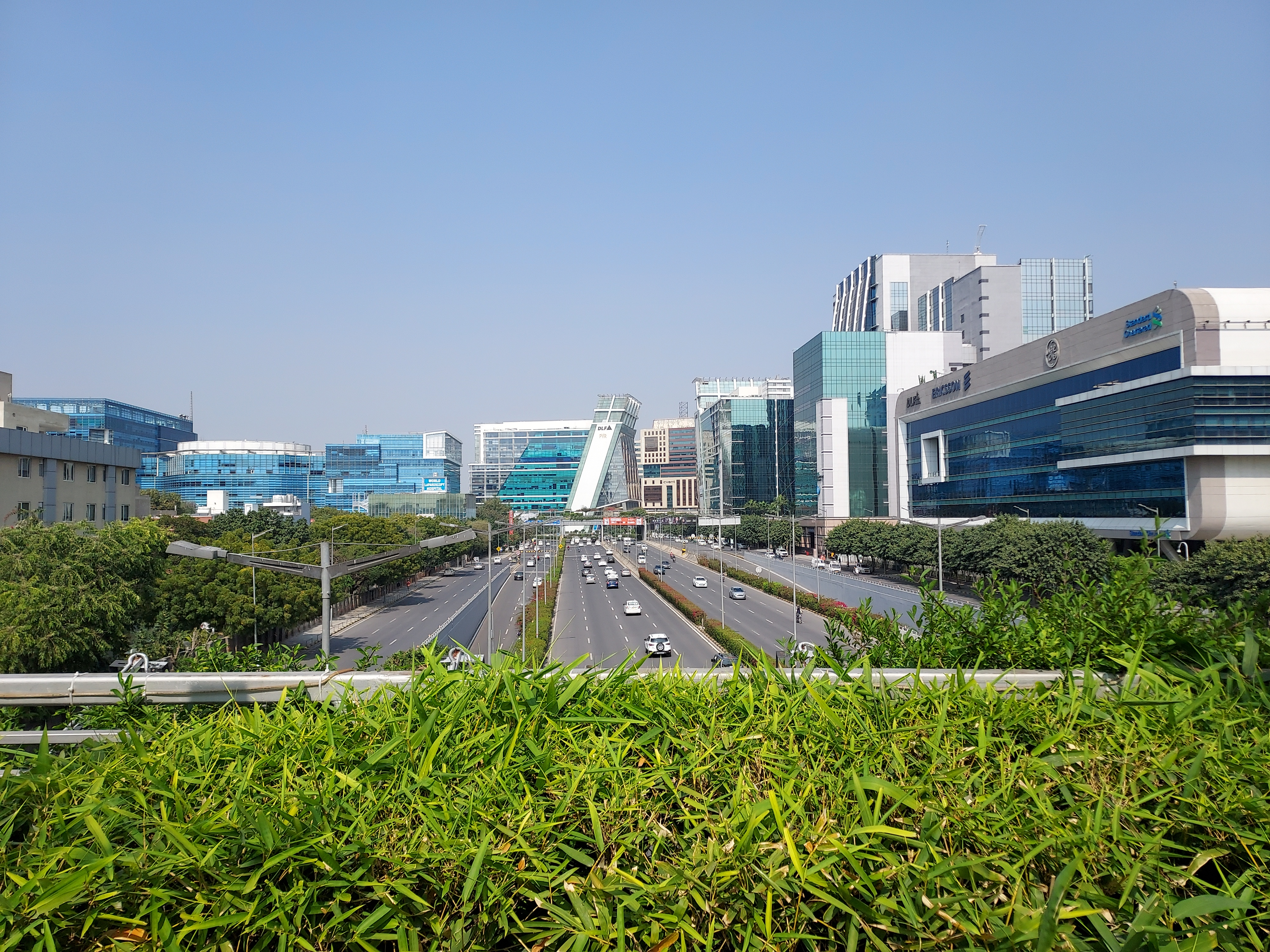
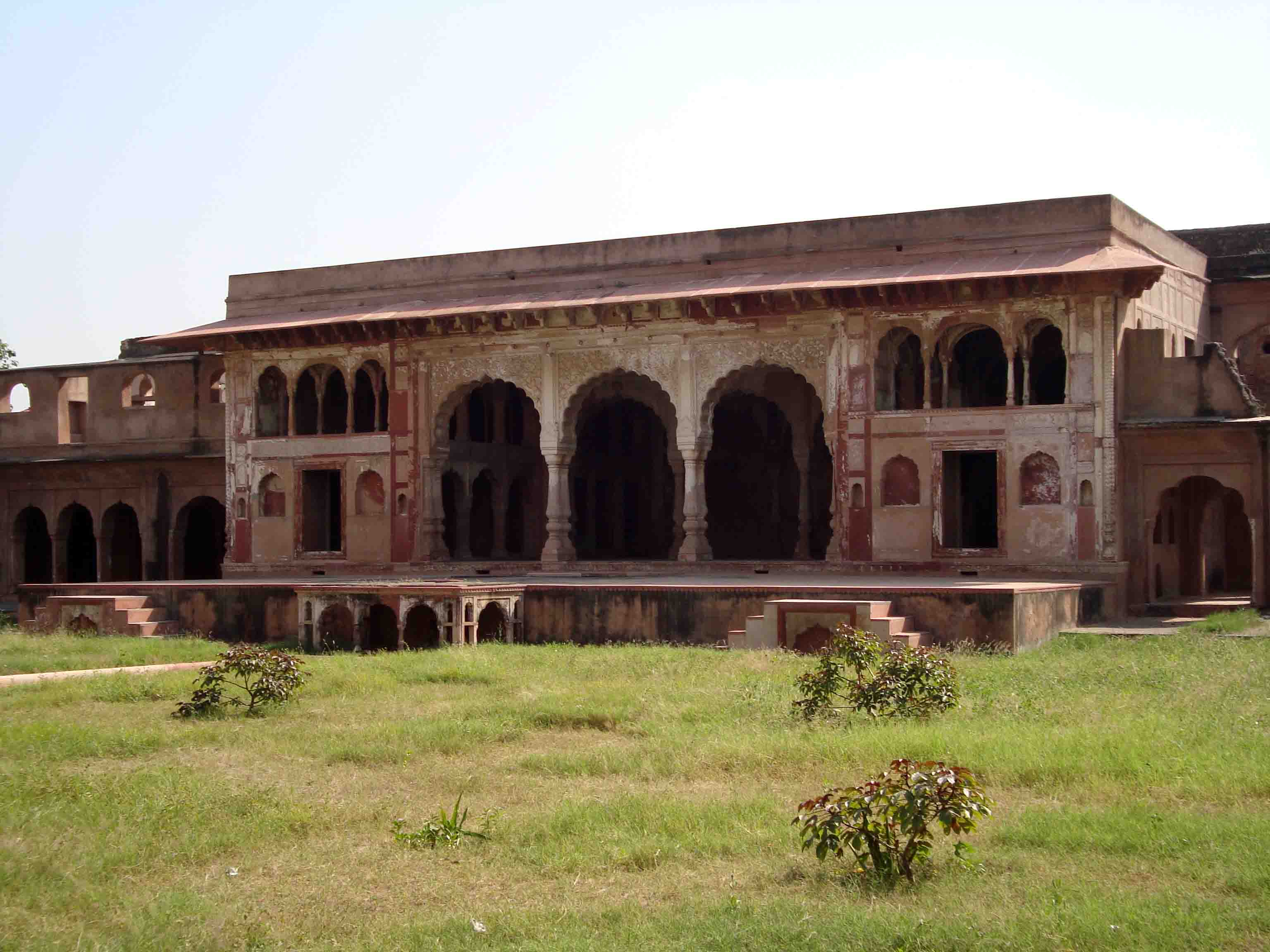
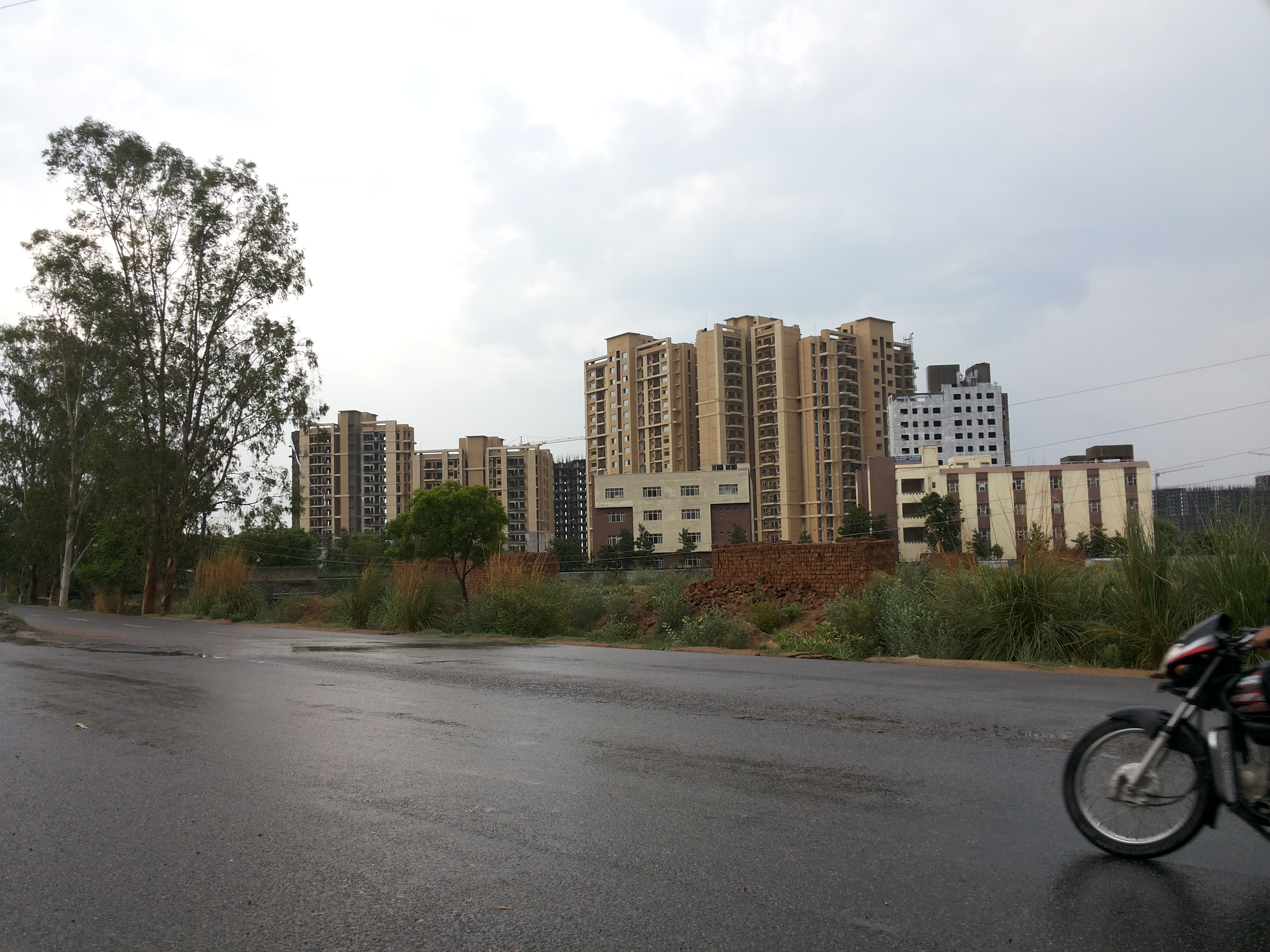
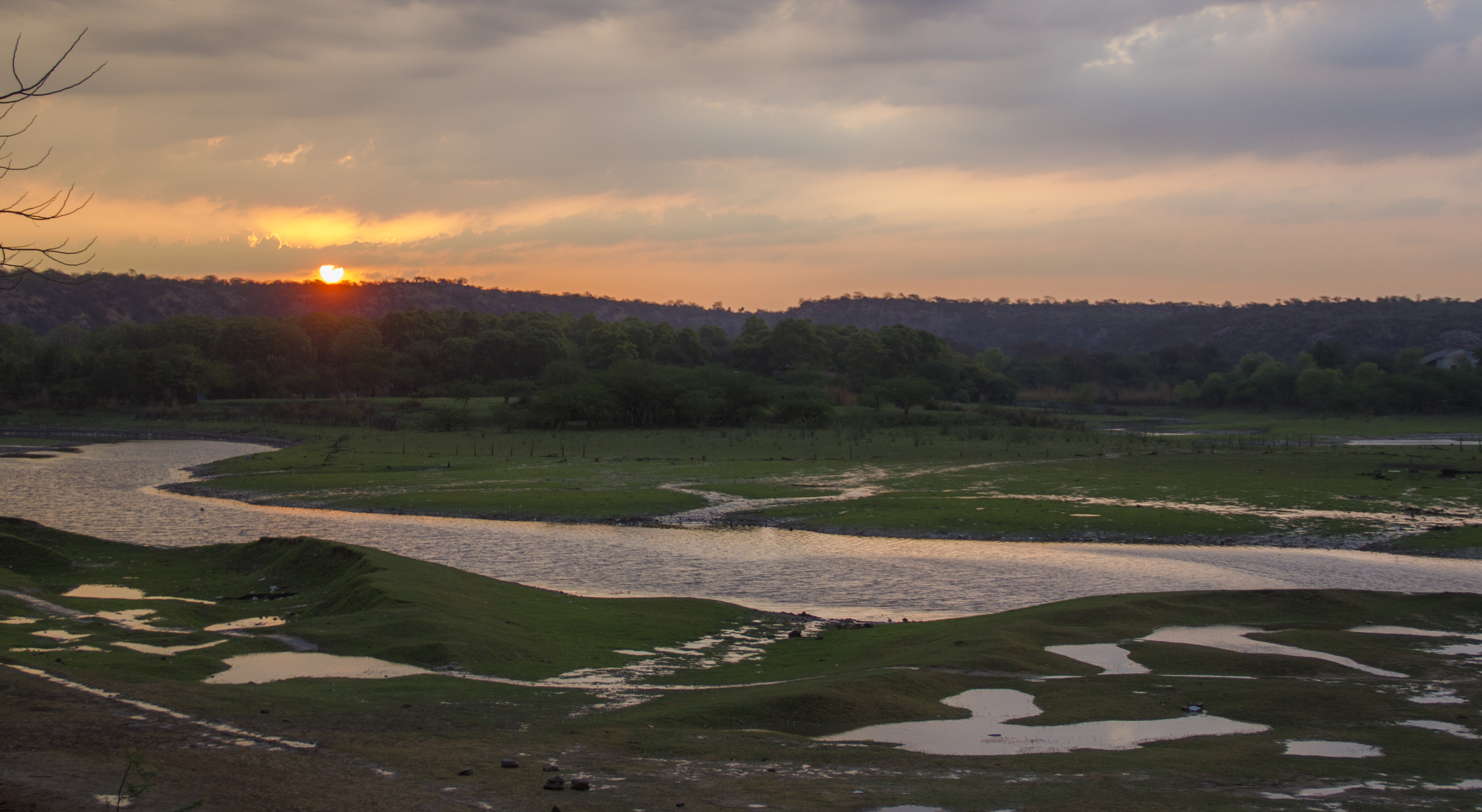
- Clockwise from top-left: Buildings in Gurgaon, Highway near Gurgaon Phase 2, New Road near Pataudi, Damdama Lake, Sheesh Mahal in Farrukhnagar

- Location in Haryana
- Country: India
- State: Haryana
- Division: Gurgaon
- Headquarters: Gurgaon
- Tehsils: 1. Gurgaon, 2. Sohna, 3. Pataudi, 4. Farukh Nagar 5. Manesar 6. Wazirabad 7. Badshahpur 8. Kadipur 9. Garhi Harsaru

Government
  - Commissioner: Ramesh Chand Bidhan, IAS
  - Commissioner of Police: Kala Ramchandran, IPS

Area
  - Total: 1,258 km^{2} (486 sq mi)

Population (2011)
  - Total: 1,514,432
  - Density: 1,204/km^{2} (3,118/sq mi)

Demographics
  - Literacy: 84.4%
  - Sex ratio: 853

Languages
  - Official: Hindi
- Time zone: UTC+05:30 (IST)
- Major highways: NH 48, NH 148A, NH 248A, NH 919, SH 15A, SH 26, MDR 132, MDR 133, MDR 136, MDR 137
- Lok Sabha constituencies: Gurgaon (Lok Sabha constituency)
- Vidhan Sabha constituencies: 1. Pataudi, 2. Badshahpur, 3. Gurgaon and 4. Sohna
- Website: gurugram.gov.in

Gurgaon district, officially known as Gurugram district, is one of the 23 districts of Haryana in northern India. The city of Gurgaon is the administrative headquarters of the district. The population is 1,514,432. It is one of the southern districts of Haryana. On its north, it is bounded by the district of Jhajjar and the Union Territory of Delhi. Faridabad district lies to its east. To its south lie the districts of Palwal and Nuh. To the west lies Rewari district.

== History ==
According to Mahabharata (900 BCE), the area was granted by the eldest Pandava king, Yudhishthira, to their teacher, Dronacharya. Later, it passed into the hands of the Maurya Empire and to invaders like the Parthians and the Kusanas, and the Yaudheya (after they expelled Kushanas from the area between Yamuna and Satluj). Yodheyas was subjugated by king Rudradaman I of the Indo-Scythians and later by the Gupta Empire and then by Hunas, who were in turn overthrown by Yashodharman of Mandsaur and then by Yashovarman of Kannauj. The area was also ruled by Harsha (590 - 467 CE) and Gurjara-Pratihara (mid 7th century CE to 11th century). The Tomara dynasty, who founded Dhillika in 736 CE, who were earlier tributaries of Partiharas, overthrew Partiharas. Tomaras were defeated by was defeated by defeated by Vigraharaja IV who were in turn were overthrown in 1156 CE by king Visaladeva Chauhan of Chauhan Dynasty.

After the defeat, Prithviraj Chauhan conquered the area of Gurgaon, Nuh, Bhiwani and Rewari in 1182 CE. However he later lost it to the Ghurids under Muhammad Ghori following the Second Battle of Tarain. Following the defeat of Prithviraj Chauhan in his turn in 1192 CE, the area came under Qutb ud-Din Aibak (1206 CE) of Delhi Sultanate who defeated and killed Prithviraj's son Hemraj who had invaded Mewat area from Alwar. Meo - who were mostly Hindu during those times - killed Sayyid Wajih-ud-Din who had been sent by Qutb ud-Din Aibak to subjugate the Meos. The Meos were later conquered and pacified by a nephew of Aibak called Miran Hussain Jang who led the Delhi Sultanate army which conquered the Mewat region sometime between 1207-1210. Many Meo converted to Islam, allegedly some in forced conversions. Those Meo who remained Hindus were obliged to pay the non-Muslim military exemption tax known as the Jizya. In 1249 CE, Balban killed 2000 rebellious Meos. Meo rebels took away large numbers of horses from Balban's army in 1257-58 CE. In 1260 CE, Balban retaliated by overrunning the Mewat area once again and killing 250 Meo prisoners and slaughtering 12,000 women, children and surviving men.

At the time of the Timurid conquests in India and the invasion of Timur in 1398 CE, Sonpar Pal, titled Bahadur Nahar, of the Hindu Jadu gotra, was the prominent king of the area who constructed the fort called Kotla Bahadur Nahar near Kotla lake at the village of Kotla, Nuh. Under the patronage of Delhi sultan Firuz Shah Tughlaq, Sonpar Pal converted to Islam with the new name Raja Nahar Khan and became the founder of the Khanzada Rajputs after submitting to Timur. In 1421 CE, Khizr Khan, the Sayyid dynasty king of Delhi, defeated Raja Nahar Khan's converted son Jalal Khan of Mewat and Kotla fort. When, in 1425, converted grandsons of Bahadur Nahar named Jalal Khan and Abdul Qadir (Jallu and Qaddu) revolted, they were defeated by Sultan of Delhi Mubarak Shah (1421– 1434 CE), who overran Mewat and killed Abdul Qadir. Jalal Khan continued the native Mewati rebellion against the Delhi Sultanate after Mubarak Shah was forced to deal with Jasrat Khokhar who had conquered the Punjab.

In 1527, Hasan Khan Mewati, a descendant of Sonpar Pal, sided with Rajput king Rana Sanga and they were defeated by the invading Mughal forces of Babur at the Battle of Khanwa where Hasan Khan Mewati was killed by the Mughals, and his son Nihad Khan, ruled Mewat as a vassal of the Mughals. Aurangzeb sent Jai Singh I to crush the revolting Khanzada Mewati chief Ikram Khan. After the death of Aurangzeb, Bahadurgarh and Farrukhnagar in the north were under the Baloch nawabs who were granted jagir in 1713 CE by the Mughal king Farrukhsiyar.

The central area of Badshapur was under Hindu Jat king Hathi Singh Kuntal while the south including Nuh was under another Jat king of Bharatpur State, Maharaja Suraj Mal.

During Maratha Empire the area was conquered by their Christian French generals in the late 18th century and they granted Farukhnagar to Begum Samru and Jharsa (Badshahpur) to her European husband Walter Reinhardt Sombre. Southern areas, including Nuh, stayed under the Bharatpur king Ranjit Singh and their vassal relatives, one of whom was Nahar Singh.

Gurgaon district was conquered by the British in 1803. On 30 December 1803, the Daulat Scindia signed the Treaty of Surji-Anjangaon with the British after the Battle of Assaye and Battle of Laswari and ceded to the British, Hisar, Panipat, Rohtak, Rewari, Gurgaon, Ganges-Jumna Doab, the Delhi-Agra region, parts of Bundelkhand, Broach, some districts of Gujarat and the fort of Ahmmadnagar.

During the 1947 Partition of India, majority of the Muslim population fled to the newly created state of Pakistan meanwhile non-Muslim population of West Punjab in modern Pakistan migrated and settled in this region. Many Hindus and Sikhs from West Punjab came and settled in this region in 1947.

On 1 November 1966, when Haryana was carved out of Punjab as a separate state, Gurgaon was already an existing district of the newly formed state of Haryana.

== Geography ==
This district contains many small hill ranges which are part of the Aravali and Mangar Bani ranges.

== Demographics ==
Historical population
Year	Pop.	±% p.a.
1901	182,978	—
1911	159,558	−1.36%
1921	148,627	−0.71%
1931	162,464	+0.89%
1941	186,775	+1.40%
1951	201,727	+0.77%
1961	259,655	+2.56%
1971	348,151	+2.98%
1981	471,695	+3.08%
1991	606,791	+2.55%
2001	874,695	+3.72%
2011	1,514,432	+5.64%

According to the 2011 census, Gurgaon district has a population of 1,514,432, roughly equal to the nation of Gabon or the US state of Hawaii. This gives it a ranking of 328th in India (out of a total of 640). The district has a population density of 1,241 inhabitants per square kilometre (3,210/sq mi) . Its population growth rate over the decade 2001-2011 was 73.93%. Gurgaon has a sex ratio of 853 females for every 1000 males, and a literacy rate of 84.4%. Scheduled Castes make up 13.07% of the population.

=== Religion ===
Religion in Gurugram district (2011)
Religion	Percent
Hinduism	93.03%
Islam	4.68%
Sikhism	1.00%
Christianity	0.64%
Other or not stated	0.65%

Religion in Gurugram District
Religious group	2011	
Religious group	Pop.	%
Hinduism	1,408,801	93.03%
Islam	70,842	4.68%
Sikhism	15,097	1%
Christianity	9,725	0.64%
Others	9,967	0.66%
Total Population	1,514,432	100%

Religious groups in Gurgaon District (British Punjab province era)
Religious group	1881		1891		1901		1911		1921		1931		1941	
Religious group	Pop.	%	Pop.	%	Pop.	%	Pop.	%	Pop.	%	Pop.	%	Pop.	%
Hinduism (Note: 1931-1941: Including Ad-Dharmis)	439,264	68.44%	455,045	68.03%	499,373	66.92%	421,885	65.59%	460,134	67.47%	493,174	66.63%	560,537	65.83%
Islam	198,610	30.94%	209,931	31.38%	242,548	32.5%	217,237	33.78%	216,860	31.8%	242,357	32.74%	285,992	33.59%
Jainism	3,777	0.59%	3,698	0.55%	3,909	0.52%	2,921	0.45%	2,762	0.4%	2,665	0.36%	2,613	0.31%
Sikhism	127	0.02%	102	0.02%	99	0.01%	342	0.05%	924	0.14%	500	0.07%	637	0.07%
Christianity	70	0.01%	152	0.02%	278	0.04%	782	0.12%	1,316	0.19%	1,463	0.2%	1,673	0.2%
Zoroastrianism	0	0%	1	0%	1	0%	9	0%	6	0%	4	0%	4	0%
Buddhism	0	0%	0	0%	0	0%	1	0%	0	0%	0	0%	0	0%
Judaism	—N/a	—N/a	0	0%	0	0%	0	0%	1	0%	0	0%	2	0%
Others	0	0%	0	0%	0	0%	0	0%	0	0%	0	0%	0	0%
Total population	641,848	100%	668,929	100%	746,208	100%	643,177	100%	682,003	100%	740,163	100%	851,458	100%
Note: British Punjab province era district borders are not an exact match in the present-day due to various bifurcations to district borders — which since created new districts — throughout the historic Punjab Province region during the post-independence era that have taken into account population increases.

Religion in the Tehsils of Gurgaon District (1921)
Tehsil	Hinduism		Islam		Sikhism		Christianity		Jainism		Others (Note: Including Buddhism, Zoroastrianism, Judaism, Tribals, others, or not stated)		Total	
Tehsil	Pop.	%	Pop.	%	Pop.	%	Pop.	%	Pop.	%	Pop.	%	Pop.	%
Gurgaon Tehsil	91,072	81.33%	19,336	17.27%	43	0.04%	625	0.56%	904	0.81%	0	0%	111,980	100%
Firozpur Jhirka Tehsil	23,510	23.92%	74,126	75.42%	6	0.01%	0	0%	643	0.65%	0	0%	98,285	100%
Nuh Tehsil	50,538	45.08%	61,458	54.81%	8	0.01%	9	0.01%	106	0.09%	0	0%	112,119	100%
Palwal Tehsil	107,948	81.93%	23,254	17.65%	58	0.04%	313	0.24%	181	0.14%	6	0%	131,760	100%
Rewari Tehsil	124,864	84.79%	21,183	14.39%	53	0.04%	296	0.2%	859	0.58%	1	0%	147,256	100%
Ballabgargh Tehsil	62,202	77.17%	17,503	21.72%	756	0.94%	73	0.09%	69	0.09%	0	0%	80,603	100%
Note: British Punjab province era tehsil borders are not an exact match in the present-day due to various bifurcations to tehsil borders — which since created new tehsils — throughout the historic Punjab Province region during the post-independence era that have taken into account population increases.

Religion in the Tehsils of Gurgaon District (1941)
Tehsil	Hinduism		Islam		Sikhism		Christianity		Jainism		Others (Note: Including Anglo-Indian Christians, British Christians, Buddhism, Zoroastrianism, Judaism, Tribals, others, or not stated)		Total	
Tehsil	Pop.	%	Pop.	%	Pop.	%	Pop.	%	Pop.	%	Pop.	%	Pop.	%
Gurgaon Tehsil	113,614	80.84%	24,878	17.7%	312	0.22%	727	0.52%	941	0.67%	71	0.05%	140,543	100%
Firozpur Jhirka Tehsil	25,777	20.83%	97,500	78.79%	14	0.01%	4	0%	448	0.36%	0	0%	123,743	100%
Nuh Tehsil	61,870	41.9%	85,462	57.88%	12	0.01%	181	0.12%	124	0.08%	0	0%	147,649	100%
Palwal Tehsil	130,234	81.58%	28,754	18.01%	183	0.11%	269	0.17%	186	0.12%	15	0.01%	159,641	100%
Rewari Tehsil	151,763	83.31%	29,277	16.07%	61	0.03%	99	0.05%	841	0.46%	134	0.07%	182,175	100%
Ballabgargh Tehsil	77,279	79.09%	20,121	20.59%	55	0.06%	177	0.18%	73	0.07%	2	0%	97,707	100%
Note1: British Punjab province era tehsil borders are not an exact match in the present-day due to various bifurcations to tehsil borders — which since created new tehsils — throughout the historic Punjab Province region during the post-independence era that have taken into account population increases. Note2: Tehsil religious breakdown figures for Christianity only includes local Christians, labelled as "Indian Christians" on census. Does not include Anglo-Indian Christians or British Christians, who were classified under "Other" category.

=== Languages ===
At the time of the 2011 Census of India, 65.60% of the population identified their first language as Hindi, 23.28% Haryanvi, 2.35% Punjabi, 2.20% Bengali and 1.33% Bhojpuri.

== Political and administrative divisions ==
=== Assembly constituencies ===
There are 4 Haryana Vidhan Sabha constituencies located in this district: Gurgaon, Sohna, Pataudi and Badshahpur. All 4 of these are part of Gurgaon Lok Sabha constituency.

=== Sub-Divisions ===
The Gurgaon district is headed by an IAS officer of the rank of Deputy Commissioner (DC) who is the chief executive officer of the district. The district is divided into 4 sub-divisions, each headed by a Sub-Divisional Magistrate (SDM): Gurgaon, Sohna, Pataudi and Badshahpur

=== Revenue tehsils ===
The above 4 sub-divisions are divided into 5 revenue tehsils, namely, Gurgaon, Sohna, Pataudi, Farrukhnagar & Manesar and 4 revenue sub-tehsils namely Wazirabad, Badshahpur, Kadipur and Garhi Harsaru. Gurgaon district also comprises 4 Rural development blocks - Gurgaon, Sohna, Pataudi and Farrukhnagar.

== Economy ==
A large number of industries and offices have been established in Gurgaon city, Manesar and Sohna Road. Cyber City on NH8 is a popular location where most Multi National Companies (MNC) have taken large office spaces. All Special Economic Zones (SEZ)s in Haryana state are in Gurgaon, except Sonipat

== Ecology ==
=== Wildlife Safari ===
Gurugram Leopard and Deer Safari, also Gurugram Wildlife Safari, will be established as an urban forest for Gurgaon city on 1,000 acres land in Aravall's foothills across several villages such as Gairatpur Bas, Sakatpur, and Sikhohpur. It will include construction of a greenfield 10-acre lake at the existing natural depression at Gairatpur Bas. Forests will be rejuvenated by plantiong the native trees. Safari will be developed, along the lines of Etawah Safari Park, in compliance of The Ministry of Environment, Forest and Climate Change (MoEFCC) regulations and guidelines. Safari and lake will support the wildlife, resident and migratory birds, tourist facilities such as boat rides and picnic spots.

Gairatpur Bas lake:
Lake near Gairatpur Bas (on the Delhi–Gurgaon Expressway NH-48) will be in the natural depression which drains into Badshahpur drain and finally into Najafgarh drain (tail end of Sahibi River before it converges with Yamuna on western gate of Delhi's Red Fort). Gairatpur Bas lake collects the rainwater from Aravallis. Haryana Forests Department (HFD) has also been laying pipelines and making channels in the Aravallis around Gairatpur Bas depression to direct rainwater to the lake during rains. To make it perennial the treated water from Gurgaon's Behrampur Sewage Treatment Plant (STP) in Sector 72 will be supplied by a 3.5 km long pipe. Behrampur STP treats 17 cr ltr/day water, of which only 90 lakh ltr was in use, and remaining 16 cr ltr/day water was available for rejuvenating the wetlands of Aravali in Gurgaon and NCR.

Significance - biodiversity and wetlands:
This area is rich in biodiversity, falls within the Northern Aravalli leopard wildlife corridor stretching from Sariska Tiger Reserve to Delhi, has several nearby wildlife areas such as Asola Bhatti Wildlife Sanctuary, Mangar Bani, Aravali Biodiversity Park, etc. There are several wetlands in Aravallis in this area, some of those formed in the abandoned open pit mines in and around the area and have significance for the migratory birds, including Damdama Lake, Badkhal Lake, 10th century ancient Surajkund reservoir and Anangpur Dam. Locals frequently spot the leopards around Gairatpur Bas, who rarely enter human habitations. According to the Haryana's Additional Principal Chief Conservator of Forests, there were nearly 100 leopards, including 18 cubs, in the Delhi-Gurugaon-Faridabad Aravalli Forests (South Delhi Ridge) in Sept 2019. Earlier in June 2019, Haryana Forests Dept had engaged Wildlife Institute of India (WII), at cost of INR 40 lakh, to conduct leopard census both in Aravalli and Shivalik areas of Haryana, as 2016 survey was held only in Shivalik hills.

Funds:
In Sept 2019, Haryana's Forests Minister had announced that they will allocate INR 300 cr for the project.

Concerns:
Activists have raised concerns that there is lack of transparency in the plan. Activists and locals also have concerns about the freedom of leopards. If Safari has any barricades it will confine the movement of free ranging leopards, they must not be placed in any enclosures as they are "already facing a threat of losing their territory because of the ruin the Aravalli forest has been facing over the past two to three decades."

Conservation:
Haryana's Additional Principal Chief Conservator of Forests, assured that "Once the DPR is ready, we will be in a better position to comment what kind of safari it will be. We will not disturb the natural movement, feeding and breeding of leopards. We are working in consultation with wildlife experts of the country and under the guidance of the ministry of environment and forest." Since [Reliance Industries Limited (RIL) has developed similar leopard safari near Jamnagar in Gujarat under Corporate social responsibility (CSR), there are suggestions to engage RIL for their partnership, expertise and CSR funding in public–private partnership (PPP) mode to set up similar sections such as the "Forest of India", "Frog House", "Insect Life", "Dragon’s Land", "Exotic Island", "Wild Trail of Haryana" and "‘Aquatic Kingdom" and many more.

Current status:
As of August 2019 was that the GDMA will lay the water pipe by March 2020 provided DPR is approved by the GoH. By October 2019, forests officials had surveyed the area and sent two separate Detailed Project Reports (DPR) to Government of Haryana (GoH) for approval - once each for the wildlifie safari by forests department and for water pipeline by PHED Haryana and GDMA (Gurugram Metropolitan Development Authority).

=== Wetland, flooding and water conservation ===
Gurgaon area has several natural lakes formed by the streams draining the Aravali hills in the area. To avoid the flooding various check dams, called "bund" or "bundh", were built.

Deforestation, ruined state of some of the check dams and obstruction to the ephemeral streams due to random urbanisation and encroachments have led to flooding. This can be prevented by rejuvenating the johads (lakes) and existing check dams and also by constructing new check dams and artificial lakes. Following must be developed to prevent flooding and enable groundwater recharge, water for wildlife which includes leopards of Haryana, eco tourism and boating, etc.

Summary of plan

- Summary of action plan: Following must be done:
  - Badshapur drain needs to be deepened
  - Additional lakes needs must be built between Teekli-Badshahpur and Ghata-Kadarpur
  - Existing lakes at Bhondsi and Damdama and stream draining into these need to be rejuvenated i.e. deepened and widened
  - Existing check dams at Ghamroj, Ghat, Gairatpur Bas, Kadarpur, Jharsa, Ghasola, etc must be rejuvenated.
  - New check dams, such as at Pandala.

Detailed action plan

- Bhondsi-Ghamroj-Damdama catchment:
  It lies on the eastern and south side of the Aravalli on the south of Gurugaon.
  - Bhondsi lake, deepen and widen to rejuvenate this lake inside the Bharat Yatra Kendra (BYK) ashram of former prime minister Chandra Shekhar and rejuvenate all the channels from hills to this lake, it must be large enough to arrest the overflow from Ghamroj and other nearby villages.
  - Ghamroj lake: greenfield lake construction and rejuvenate existing bund and channel to arrest the water from the eastern and south side of the Aravalli on the south of Gurugaon.
  - Damdama Lake, rejuvenate the lake and build more upstream check dams, and construct ponds for the wildlife on top of Aravalli which must be supplied by the solar powered silent pumps.
- Badshapur-Teekli-Gairatpur Bas catchment:
  It lies ion the Aravalli south of Gurugaon. Pandala and Gairatpur Bas streams confluence at Teekli and through the Badshapur (sec 66) drain flow through Khandsa (sec 37) and Gadoli (sec 37B) to Daultabad (sec 103) and Honda Chowk flooding all these areas. This requires rejuvenation of existing streams and bunds and construction of new ones at the following location.
  - Teekli-Badshapur greenfield lake: a large greenfield lake must be constructed between Teekli and Badshahpur to arrest the water from Aravalli south of Gurugaon.
  - Pandala, Haryana, greenfield bund and channels
  - Gairatpur Bas, rejuvenate existing bund and channels, construct new if needed.
  - Teekli, rejuvenate existing bund and channels, construct new if needed.
- Ghata-Kadarpur catchment:
  - Ghata-Kadarpur lake: greenfield lake between upstream Ghata and Kadarpur to arrest the water from Aravali hills which arrives via the Gold Course and rejuvenate downstream lakes/johads at Jharsa and Ghasola.
  - Ghata, Haryana,
  - Kadarpur,
  - Jharsa, rejuvenate check dams and streams
  - Ghasola (sec 49), rejuvenate check dams to prevent flooding at Ghata-Kardarpur.

=== Deforestation and illegal encroachments ===
Due to the rapid urbanisation in and around Gurgaon, there is rampant illegal deforestation and encroachments by people in violation of rules, often in cahoots with corrupt officials. In February 2021, authorities from the town of Sohna demolished 15 illegally-built structures in Aravali Retreat, after an order from the National Green Tribunal directed the Haryana government to enforce protection of the Aravali range.

== Villages ==
- Khandewla
- Mangwaki
- Nanukalan
- Nawada Fatehpur
- Patherheri

== See also ==
- Administrative divisions of Haryana
