= Yamuna Biodiversity Park =

Yamuna biodiversity park
- Interactive map of Yamuna biodiversity park
- Type: Natural area
- Location: Jagatpur Khadar, Wazirabad, Delhi
- Nearest city: Sangam Vihar
- Coordinates: 28.7341761°N 77.2146663°E
- Area: 457 acres (185 ha)
- Created: 2015
- Operator: Delhi Development Authority
- Status: Open

Yamuna Biodiversity Park, located on Yamuna river front is a 457 acres biodiversity area in Delhi, India. It is developed by Delhi Development Authority (DDA) with the technical help of Centre for Environmental Management of Degraded Ecosystems (CEMDE), University of Delhi.

== History ==
Delhi has 7554 hectares of fragmented forests which are deprived of wild animals due to unplanned urbanisation, and of the 400 wetlands, fewer than 3 or 4 were left. In 2015, Delhi already had Aravalli Biodiversity Park and Yamuna biodiversity park. Delhi Development Authority (DDA) engaged the scientist of Delhi University to develop four more biodiversity parks in Delhi, including the Northern ridge biodiversity park (Kamla Nehru Ridge), Tilpath Valley Biodiversity Park, Neela Hauz biodiversity park and Phase 2 of the Yamuna Biodiversity Park. Phase I of Yamuna biodiversity park focused on barren floodplains commenced in 2005 and phase-2 focused on the active floodplains commenced in 2015.

== Restoration ==
In 2005 restoration of floodplains of Yamuna commenced, which had been lying barren due to sodic soil making it difficult for plants to grow. In Phase-I, 157 acres ecosystem was restored by developing two wetlands, a grassland and forest communities. Native plant species were reintroduced to reduce the salt content in the soil. The pH level (scale of acidity) of the soil was not neutral and detrimental to the success of the native Indian plants. Researchers from Delhi University had to plant one specific species of grass that brought the pH level from 10 to seven (neutral) level.

=== Flora ===
According to Prof. C R Babu of Delhi University, initially only mongooses, lizards and 31 species of birds were there in the park up until 2004. By 2014 the biodiversity park already had 900 species of native plants. The native species reintroduced included adina, sal, teak and hardwickia. As of 2019, it has about 1,500 species of plants and animals, and 200 species of birds.

=== Fauna ===
By 2014, the wetlands was already attracting thousands of migratory birds from Siberia, Central Asia and Europe. It had 200 species of birds, 75 species of butterflies, 10 species of snakes, and big mammals like porcupine, small Indian civet and wild boars.

== See also ==
- Delhi Ridge
- National Parks & Wildlife Sanctuaries of Haryana
- Biodiversity Park, Visakhapatnam
