= Aravali Biodiversity Park =

Aravali Biodiversity Park may refer to:

- Aravali Biodiversity Park, Gurgaon located in city of Gurgaon, Haryana, India
- Aravali Biodiversity Park, New Delhi, located in the Delhi Ridge in the city of New Delhi, India
