= Neela Hauz Biodiversity Park =

Neela Hauz biodiversity park
- Interactive map of Neela Hauz biodiversity park
- Type: Natural Area
- Location: along Aruna Asaf Ali Road, South Central Ridge, Delhi Ridge
- Nearest city: Hauz Khas, Delhi
- Coordinates: 28.5286867°N 77.1686125°E
- Area: 3.90 hectares
- Created: 2015
- Operator: Delhi Development Authority
- Status: Open

Neela Hauz biodiversity park, located on South Central Delhi Ridge of Aravalli Range next to Sanjay Van, in Delhi, India, is a 3.90 hectares mini biodiversity and wetland area along Aruna Asaf Ali Road. It lies in the Northern Aravalli leopard wildlife corridor.

== History ==
In 2014, of the 611 water bodies in Delhi, 274 were dead and remaining were in bad shape. Neela Hauz is a freshwater lake which was slowly dying due to the dumping of waste. During ancient times it was the main source of water supply for the Rajput city of Qila Rai Pithora. During ancient times, its basin was recharged by the wider dense forests of Sanjay Van and its overflow drained in to Yamuna.

In 2014, the wetland was covered with water hyacinth and ridge was infested with the invasive species of prosopis juliflora (Vilayati Babul or Kikar of Mexican origin), which were planted in the 1920s by the Britisher colonisers to rehabilitate the wasteland. The silted up lake was encroached upon and raw sewage drained into it, causing concerned citizens to take an order from Delhi High Court to have it restored by the government. After the restoration started in 2015, this biodiversity park was officially inaugurated in November 2016.

Delhi has 7,884 hectares of fragmented forests which are deprived of wild animals due to the unplanned urbanisation. In 2015, Delhi already had Aravalli Biodiversity Park and Yamuna Biodiversity Park. The Delhi Development Authority engaged the scientist of Delhi University to develop four more biodiversity parks in Delhi, including the Northern ridge biodiversity park (Kamla Nehru Ridge), Tilpath valley biodiversity park, Neelahauz biodiversity park and phase-2 of the Yamuna Biodiversity Park.

== Restoration ==
In 2015, the Delhi Development Authority commenced the work to restore this as a biodiversity area. Lake was desilted, its banks landscaped, water supply was restored with the treated water from the Wastewater Treatment Plant, and native species of plants were reintroduced in 10 acres of the land surrounding the lake. To improve the water quality before water enters the lake, the Constructed Wetland System (CWS) consists of zero energy input physical and biological processes, including 2 oxidation points and four filtration ponds/channels. In first step of oxidation the organic sewage material is broken down by the atmospheric oxygen by microbes and in the second stage the aquatic plants treat the water. Four channels have filters, such as pebbles and sand of varying size, to filter the water before it enters the lake. After the CWS was operationalised, it is claimed that the Biochemical oxygen demand (BOD) fell from 40 to 4, phosphate 104 to 14, total dissolved solids from 600 to 298 and dissolved oxygen improved from 0 to 3.4.

Independent water testing was carried out by the Delhi Jal Board in June 2019 as part of the investigation carried out by the Ground Water Monitoring Committee appointed by the NGT. It was found that the treated effluent did not meet permissible standards. Prof. C.R. Babu was to improve the parameters of the effluent but up to November 2019 no published action has been taken.

Several ridges of Delhi are being restored to revive the native species including leopard, Indian rock python, jackals, neelgai, mongooses, porcupines, small Indian civet, gecko, Sirkeer malkoha cuckoo, nightjar, Indian paradise flycatcher.

== Flora ==
15,000 native plants and shrubs of 75 species from 6 bio communities were planted in 2015–16. Slopes were stabilised by planting the grasses, such as chrysopogon, heteropogon and cenchrus ciliaris. Wetland has restocked with the phytoplankton, zooplankton, free floating and rooted aquatic plants.

== Fauna ==
By 2016, the lake was home to over 70 bird species, including migratory birds.

== See also ==
- Delhi Ridge
- National Parks & Wildlife Sanctuaries of Haryana
- Biodiversity Park, Visakhapatnam
