= Biodiversity Park, Visakhapatnam =

Park in Andhra Pradesh, India

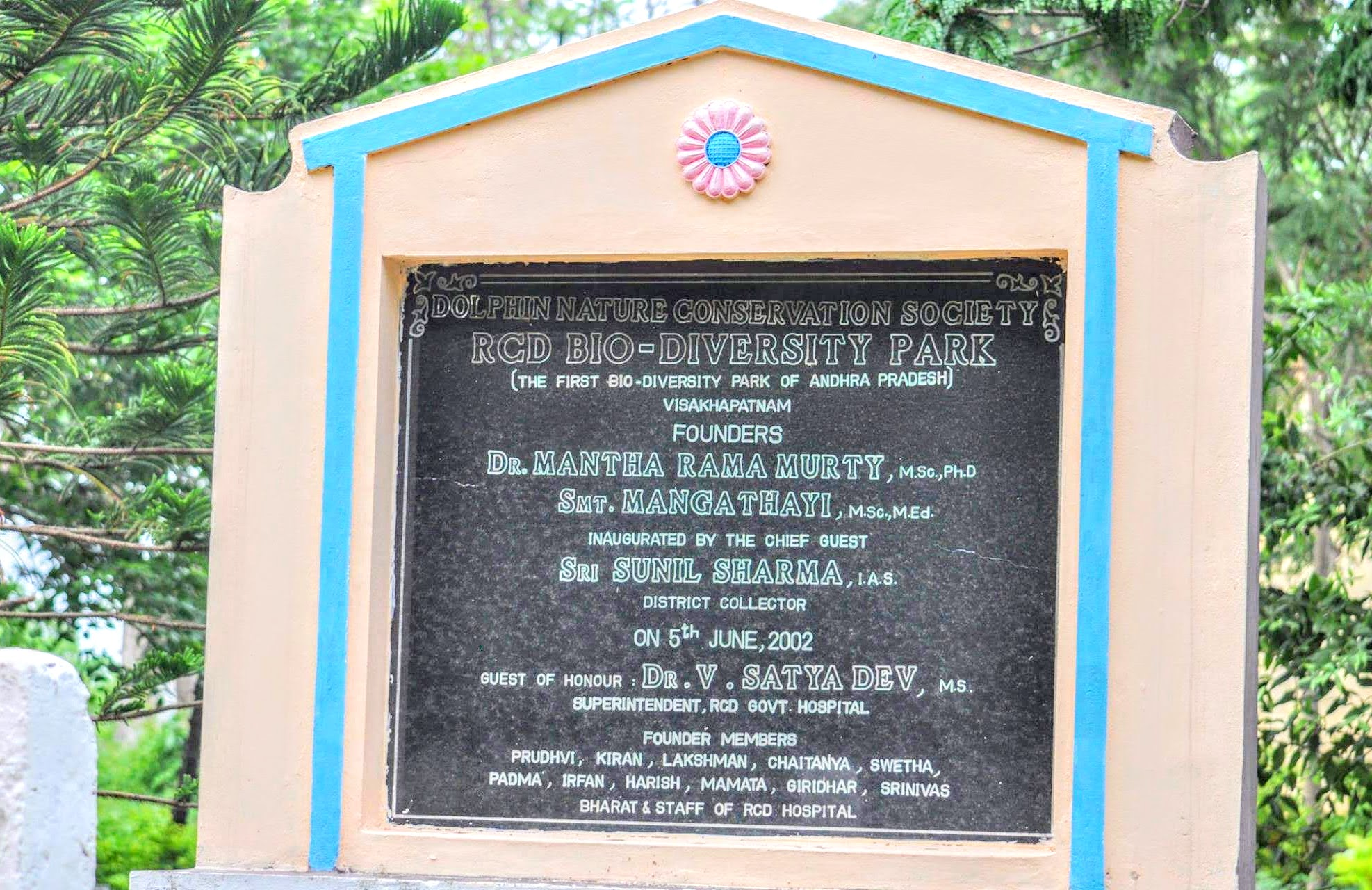
- Inauguration Stone
- Interactive map of Biodiversity Park, Visakhapatnam
- Type: Biodiversity park ex situ / educative botanical garden
- Location: Rani Chandramani Devi Government Hospital, Pedda Waltair, Visakhapatnam, Andhra Pradesh, India
- Coordinates: 17.7290304°N 83.3364321°E
- Area: 3 acres (1.2 ha)
- Operator: DNCS in co-ordination with VMRDA and RCD Govt. Hospital
- Status: Open all year

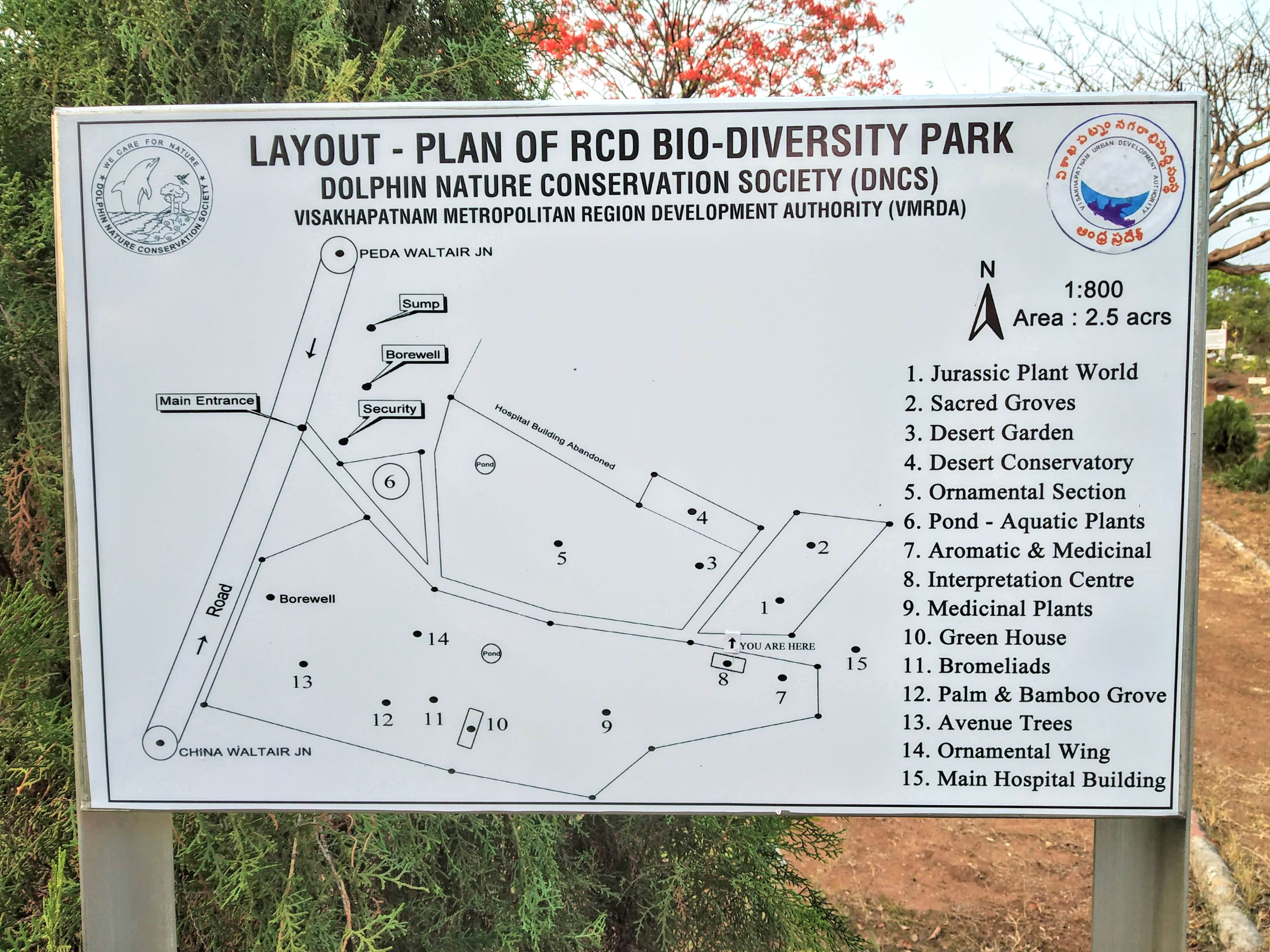

Biodiversity Park, Visakhapatnam, is a botanical garden, an ex situ conservation park, first of its kind in Visakhapatnam, Andhra Pradesh, India. The park is located in the premises of the Rani Chandramani Devi Government Hospital. It extends over 3 acres (1.2 ha). Dolphin Nature Conservation Society (DNCS), Visakhapatnam, a registered, eco-friendly, non-government organization, has maintained it for 13 years and is now maintaining it in collaboration with the hospital and Visakhapatnam Metropolitan Region Development Authority. The park was inaugurated on 5 June 2002. This park has more than 2,000 species of plants. and has recorded visits by 60 species of birds and 105 species of butterflies. The park has become a "living laboratory" for education, awareness and research for students, and botanists, zoologists and researchers.

== Zones ==
The park has 10 major zones:

- Sacred Groves
- Living Fossil plants of Jurassic times (Gymnosperms)
- Cacti and Succulents
- Ornamental Plants
- Aquatic Plants
- Medicinal or Herbal and Aromatic Plants
- Insectivorous Plants
- Orchids
- Ferns
- Bamboo and Palm Groves

These sections harbour very rare and endangered species like maidenhair tree (Ginkgo biloba) and botanical oddities or curiosities like Krishna's butter cup, holy cross, Jesus smile, autograph tree, upside-down tree, Mickey Mouse tree, laughing Buddha bamboo, octopus tree. It has a 'green house or polynetted house', 'pond', 'cactus & succulent conservatory'. The society started a interpretation-cum-training centre, to conduct workshops and training programs.

== Plants ==
The Biodiversity Park contains the following groups of plant:

- Sacred plants of Sacred Groves zone: Sacred groves section harbors plant species related to Ganesha worship (21 plants), Nakshatra vanam / birth stars or star constellations (27 plants), Raasi vana / Zodiac signs (12 plants), Saptharishi vana / 7 Indian sages garden (7 plants) and Navagraha vana (9 plants).
- Medicinal / Herbal and Aromatic: Nearly 500 species of Medicinal plants or Medicinal herbs, including Pterocarpus santalinus, Santalum album, Gloriosa superba, Rauvolfia serpentina, Gymnema sylvestre, Costus igneus.
- Ornamentals: Over 200 varieties, such as Couroupita guianensis, Passiflora, Acalypha hispida, Clerodendrum incisum, Clerodendrum thomsoniae, James Bond 007, Ochna serrulata.
- Cacti: Nearly 100 varieties, including Golden Barrel cactus Echinocactus grusonii, Rubyball cactus Gymnocalycium mihanovichii
- Succulents: 300 varieties, including Lithops spp.
- Aquatic plants: Over 50 species, including Victoria amazonica. Some other examples are: Lilies, Lotus, Equisitum, Vallisneria, Hydrilla, Potamogeton. The park has mangrove plants like Avicennia marina with respiratory roots or pneumatophores, Sea brites, Acanthophyllum etc.
- Bromeliads: 15 species of bromeliads are cultivated, including plants that live on air ex:Tillandsia.
- Ferns: Species cultivated include Nephrolepis (Swordfern), Asplenium nidus (Bird's nest fern), Pteris, Polypodium, Asplenium hemionitis – Star Fern (Notholaenaceae), Hemionitis arifolia – Heart Fern (Notholaenaceae).
- Insectivorous plants: Nepenthes (Pitcher plant).
- Bamboo Grove: 5 species of bamboo are seen, including Laughing Buddha bamboo Bambusa ventricosa, Golden bamboo, Green bamboo.
- Palm Grove: Over 25 species, including Wodyetia bifurcata, Caryota urens, Hyophorbe lagenicaulis, Cyrtostachys renda
- Arboretum: This includes over 200 native and exotic tree species.

== Birds ==
60 species of birds have been recorded in the park, including Golden-backed woodpecker, Spotted owlet, Parakeets, Brahminy starling, Greater Coucal, Red-whiskered bulbul, Purple sunbird and Barn owl.

== Butterflies ==
More than 100 species belonging to 6 families were observed in the Eastern Ghats Forests and Urban Environments of Visakhapatnam District, of which the family Papilionidae is represented by more than 10 species, Pieridae with more than 20 species, Nymphalidae with more than 30 species, Lycaenidae with more than 20 species, Riodinidae with 1 species and Hesperiidae with more than 10 species. Some species of male butterflies ex. crows n tigers show interesting mechanism called clustering. During monsoon months, males congregate around some species of plants like Crotalaria retusa, Heliotropium indicum to suck some alkaloides or sex pheromones which are essential for mating.

== Cyclone Hudhud ==
In October 2014 Cyclone Hudhud caused extensive damage and loss of life in eastern India and Nepal. The entire park was severely damaged and almost became like a graveyard; almost all tree species were uprooted, fences destroyed, and the pond, greenhouse and cacti house collapsed. The park was rejuvenated within a span of one year by student volunteers with government support.

== Awards ==
The Dolphin Nature Conservation Society (DNCS) received two Andhra Pradesh Government state level awards for the development and maintenance of Biodiversity Park, Visakhapatnam.

== See also ==
- Biodiversity park, Hyderabad
- Yamuna biodiversity park
- Neela Hauz biodiversity park
- Tilpath Valley Biodiversity Park
- Northern Ridge biodiversity park
- Aravali Biodiversity Park, Gurgaon
- Acharya Jagadish Chandra Bose Indian Botanic Garden
- Biodiversity Park, Arjuni Morgaon
