= Tilpat Valley Biodiversity Park =

Biodiversity area in Delhi Ridge, Delhi

- Interactive map of Tilpat Valley Biodiversity Park
- Type: Natural Area
- Location: Delhi Ridge, Delhi
- Coordinates: 28.4895885°N 77.2132106°E
- Area: 172 acres (70 ha)
- Created: 2015
- Operator: Delhi Development Authority
- Status: Open

Tilpat Valley Biodiversity Park, is a 172 acre biodiversity area in the South Delhi Ridge within the Northern Aravalli Leopard Wildlife Corridor, located northwest of the Asola Bhatti Wildlife Sanctuary.

== History ==
Under development since 2015, it was officially inaugurated as Delhi's third biodiversity park on February 3, 2018.

== Restoration ==
The valleys in this region were once scattered with sand-mined quarries and dried-up springs due to a lack of groundwater recharge. There was no natural forest cover, only invasive weed species like Prosopis juliflora (vilayati kikar), lantana, and parthenium. During its restoration, invasive foreign species were replaced with the three layers of forest community: native trees, shrubs and grassland. Scrubland was restored to attract the reptiles and birds. In 2015, 40,000 volunteers planted over 100,000 trees within 6 hours. In 2016, volunteers replicated the feat yet again by planting 20,000 trees.

=== Flora ===
The park now features grasslands and hilly terrain with over 105 species of trees and shrubs. Native species include mahua, haldu, sheesham and bael.

=== Fauna ===
In 2016, the park was teeming with over 103 bird species, 32 butterflies species, 15 herpetofauna (reptiles and amphibians) species and eight mammalian species including leopard, hyena, Indian rock python, jackals, neelgai, mongooses, porcupines, small Indian civet, gecko, Sirkeer malkoha cuckoo, nightjar, Indian paradise flycatcher. Wildlife surveys are conducted using pugmarks tracking with the pug impression pad (PIP) and by photographing the wild animals. Proposals for the reintroduction of mammalian megafauna, such as chinkara, chital deer, hog deer, have been floated and are currently under consideration.

== See also ==
- Delhi Ridge
- Tilpat
- National Parks & Wildlife Sanctuaries of Haryana
- Biodiversity Park, Visakhapatnam
