= Flagstaff Tower =

19th-century signal tower in Kamla Nehru Ridge, Delhi, India

Coordinates: 28.6881°N 77.2181°E

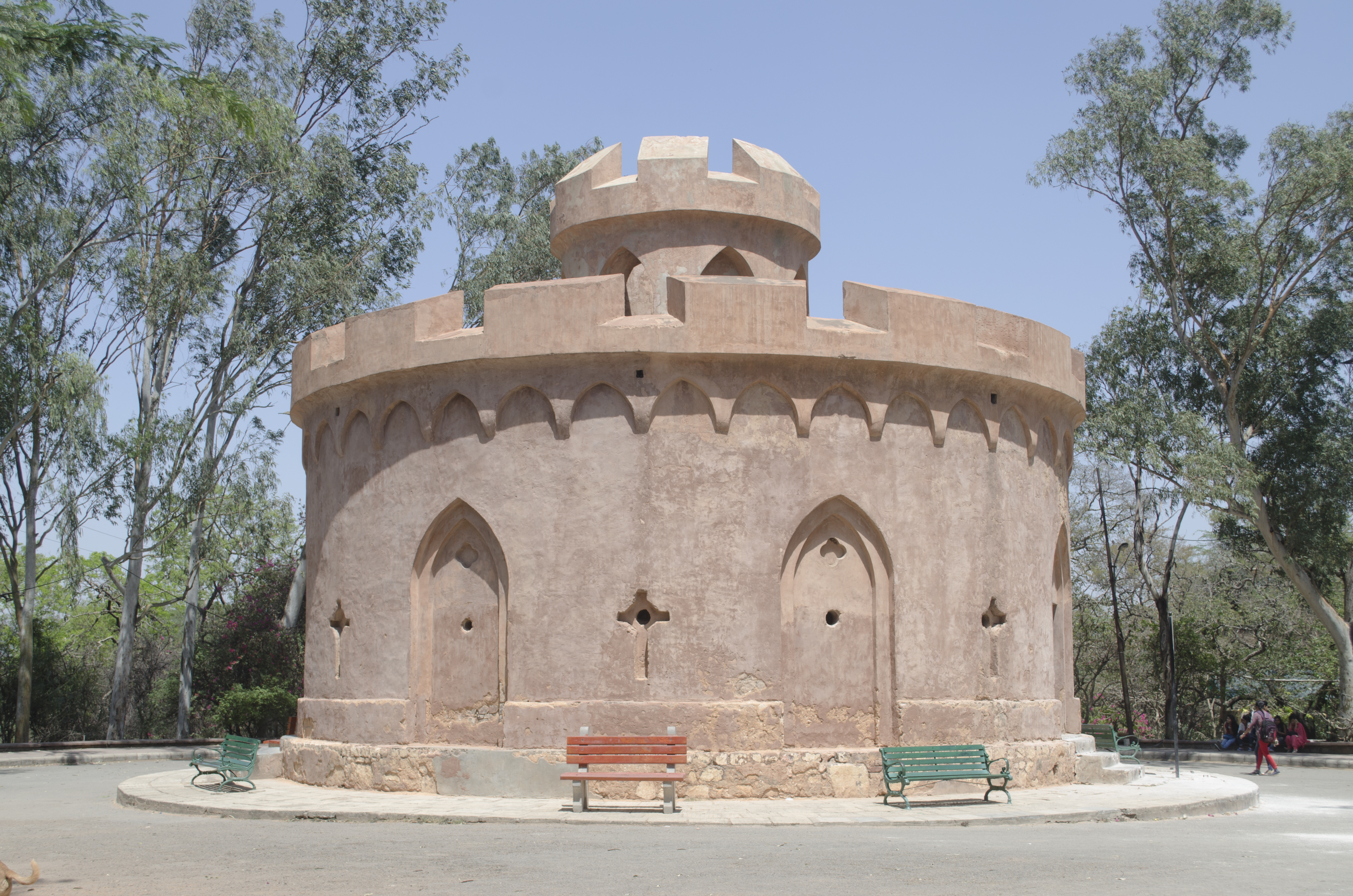
Flagstaff Tower

Flagstaff Tower is a one-room, castellated tower, built around 1828 as a signal tower, located in Kamla Nehru Ridge near the present-day North Campus of Delhi University in Delhi, India. It was here that many Europeans and their families sheltered on 11 May 1857, during the Siege of Delhi by the rebels at the beginning of the Indian rebellion of that year, waiting for help to arrive from nearby Meerut. Built by the British Indian Army, the building was part of the British cantonment and was used as a signal tower. Before forestation started in 1910, the area where the tower was built was the highest point on the ridge and was mostly barren, covered with low-lying shrub. Today it is a memorial and "protected monument" under Archaeological Survey of India.

The monument is preserved. This cemetery, where British soldiers who fell during the uprising are buried with their leader, Brigadier John Nicholson, is preserved. High Commissioner Michael Arthur, who helped in the restoration of the cemetery, noted its historical value from 1857.

== History ==
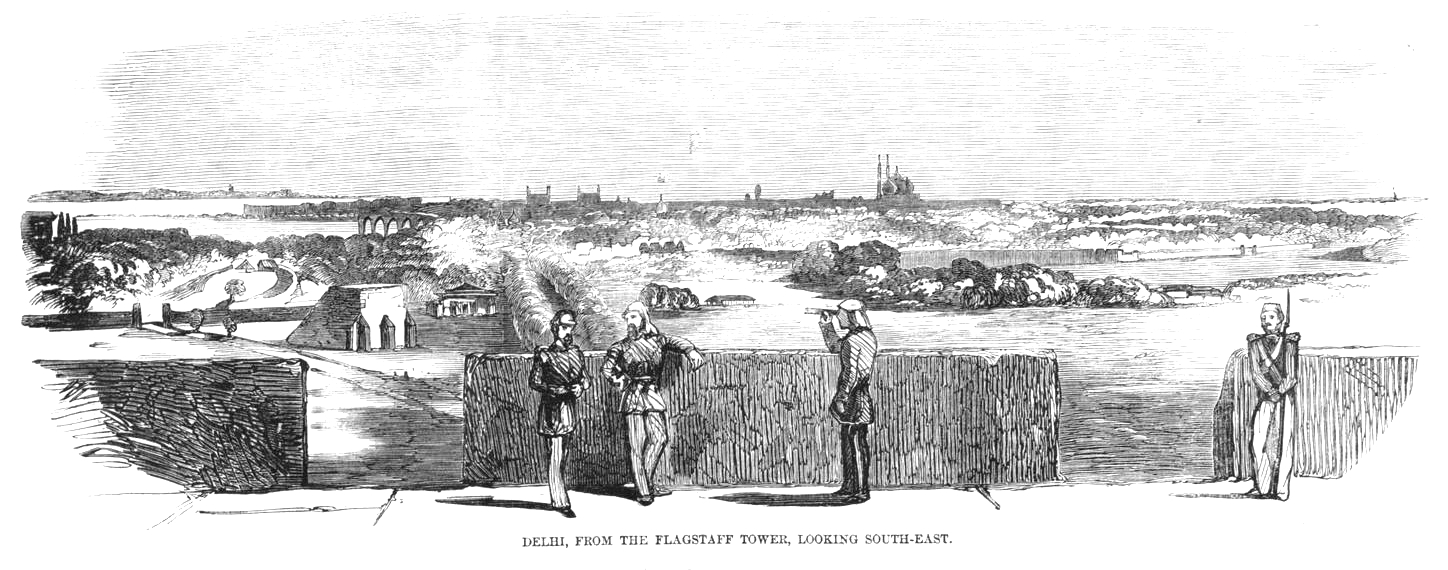
An 1857 illustration of the view from the Flagstaff Tower, looking to the south-east

Flagstaff Tower played an important role during the Indian Rebellion of 1857, when Delhi was captured by the rebellious East India Company forces. On the morning of 11 May 1857, when the sepoys started hunting for and killing European personnel and Christian Indians in the Cantonment, Civil Lines and the walled city of Delhi, the survivors started fleeing towards the Tower.

A month later the Company army returned to capture Delhi, which was now with the sepoys. On 7 June, they faced stiff resistance from the sepoys at the Flagstaff Tower. A fierce battle followed which led to the killing and wounding of a great number of soldiers. However, by five in the evening the ridge had been recaptured and was now under British control.

== Architecture ==
Inside the tower, which is locked, there is a circular room that can hold a crowd of up to a hundred people. It resembles a mini fort but not that safe. In recent times some parts of the tower have been ruined due to people having scribbled on its wall. Before forestation in the year 1910, the area where the tower was built was the point on the ridge and was mostly barren and covered with small-sized shrubs.

== See also ==
- Siege of Cawnpore
- Siege of Delhi
- Siege of Lucknow
