= Rani Chandramani Devi Government Hospital =

Coordinates: 17.728971°N 83.336774°E

- Government of Andhra Pradesh

Geography
- Location: Pedda Waltair, Visakhapatnam, India

Organisation
- Affiliated university: Dr. NTR University of Health Sciences

Services
- Emergency department: yes
- Beds: 100

Helipads
- Helipad: No

History
- Opened: 1965

Rani Chandramani Devi Government Hospital is a children's hospital located at Pedda Waltair, Visakhapatnam, India.

== History ==
The site of the hospital was donated by the Queen of Chemudu in the year of 1965 as per her will. The hospital was started with 20 beds, later expanded to 100 beds.

== Biodiversity park ==
The Biodiversity park at the Rani Chandramani Devi Government Hospital is maintained by the Dolphin Nature Conservation Society in collaboration with the Visakhapatnam Metropolitan Region Development Authority and the RCD Government Hospital Development Committee. The park was established in the year 2002 and houses over 2000 species of plants. It extends over an area of 3 acres with 10 major sections: medicinal & aromatic, living fossils from the Jurassic era, insectivorous, orchids, cacti & succulents, sacred groves, ferns, aquatic, bamboo and palm groves and ornamental. It has many botanical curiosities, such as the Pitcher plant, Mickey Mouse, Krishna's butter cup, Holy cross, Jesus smile, Upside-down tree, Autograph, James Bond 007 pipe, Laughing Buddha and also rare plants like the Ginkgo biloba. More than 100 species of butterflies are reported from this garden. The garden provides a salubrious climate and mental relaxation to the patients of the hospital.

== See also ==
- King George Hospital
- Government Victoria Hospital
