= Latika Thukral =

Indian banker (born 1967)

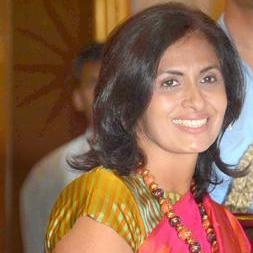
- Thukral in 2015
- Born: 1967 (age 58–59); India
- Education: University of Delhi
- Occupations: Banker, activist
- Employer: Citibank
- Known for: a Nari Shakti Award for founding #IamGurgaon
- Children: Two

Latika Thukral (born c. 1967) is an Indian banker who is known for transforming her city, in particular Aravali Biodiversity Park in Gurgaon. Million native trees were planted by the group #IAmGurgaon. She was awarded the Nari Shakti Award in 2015 by the President of India on International Women's Day from the Indian President Pranab Mukherjee.

== Early life & education ==
Thukral was born in about 1967 and she graduated in marketing from the University of Delhi.

== Work ==
She worked for two years with ITC Hotels before beginning an 18-year career at Citibank where she rose to be a senior vice president.

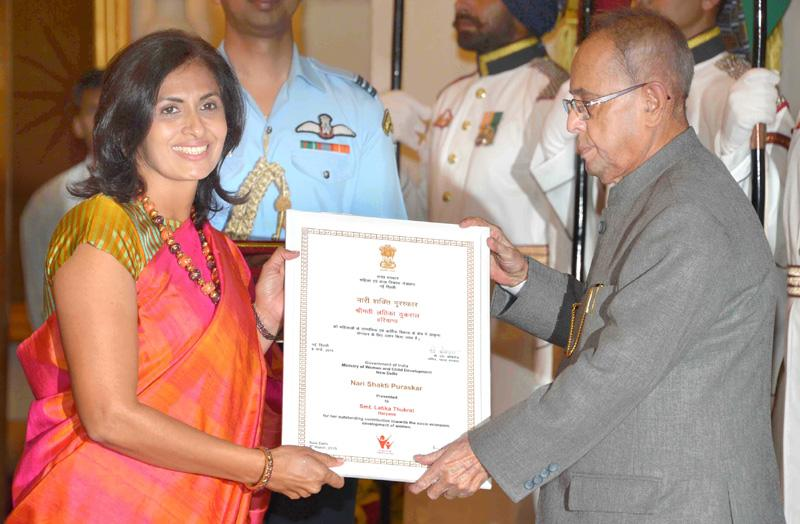
Latika Thukral receives the Nari Shakti Award from the President

She came to notice when she became concerned at the city of Gurgaon. She had moved there in 1996 and the small town had grown, but it had grown without design or planning. She lived in a middle class area but one park in continue caught her notice. She founded the campaign #IamGurgaon in 1999 and she attracted other volunteers. They decided to plant a million native trees in their city.

During the coronavirus outbreak in 2020, #IamGurgaon was highly involved with the task of supplying cooked food to the impoverished families of the city. Some areas were being helped by nearby condominiums. Thukra estimated in April that they would need to supply food for at least two months. It was estimated that it was going to cost 3,250 rupees per family, per month, and there were estimated to be fifteen to twenty thousands of families.

== Awards ==
The Haryana Government, on Republic Day in 2010 gave her an appreciation award. 'IamGurgaon' has been working with the local government and their projects had attracted support from corporate companies.

She was awarded one of the first eight Nari Shakti Awards for her leadership and achievement in 2015. The award was given on International Women's Day from the Indian President Pranab Mukherjee.
