= Pugmark =

Footprint of a wild animal

A pugmark is an animal track, a footprint, left by a wild animal. The distinctive pugmark of an individual species is useful for identification. "Pug" means foot in Hindi (Sanskrit पद् "pad"; Greek πούς "poús").

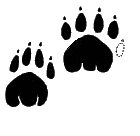
An image of a thylacine pugmark

Pugmark tracking is a technique used by wildlife conservationists to identify the distribution of species. For some species, such as tigers, pugmark tracking is now considered to be an unreliable method of determining an area's total animal population, leading to the rise in the use of alternative techniques to count populations, such as photographic capture.

== Field data collection ==
Indian forester Saroj Raj Choudhury developed the technique of the ‘pugmark census’ in 1966 to track tigers. It involves collecting pugmark tracings and plaster casts from the field and analyzing these to determine the number, track dimensions and spatial distribution of key species.

=== Technique ===
In order to obtain good pug impressions, PIPs (pug impression pads) are laid along roads, animal tracks and footpaths. Field data for each pugmark are then collected in specially devised census forms. The plaster casts and tracings along with field information are together analysed with map of the area to remove repetitions and overlaps in pug-evidences collected for the same tiger.

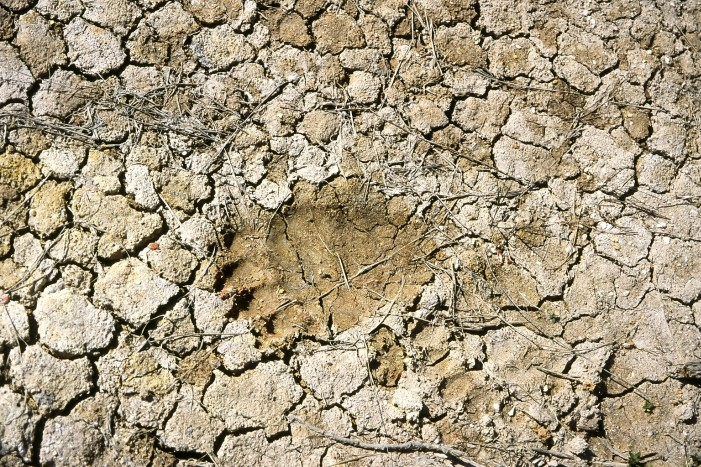
Pugmark of a bear

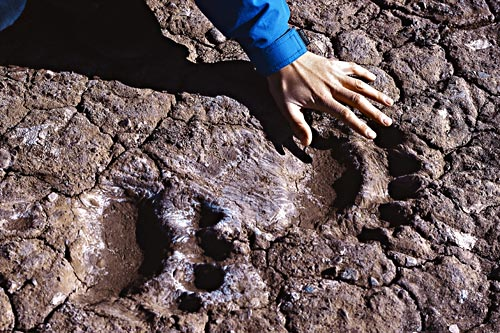
A polar bear pugmark

The final result claimed to indicate the (a) total numbers of male, female and cub of tiger and leopard, (b) their pugmark dimensions with stride where available, (c) the names of locations where the pugmarks of each tiger have been traced to show the gross movement areas (d) interrelationship among different tigers by linking each male to female and the latter to cubs tracked in the movement area, and finally (e) spatial distribution map.

The technique was used for over three decades in India, until the 1990s when it was found to be an inaccurate way to measuring tiger populations.

=== Benefits as a data collection method ===
The above approach to pugmark tracking has been developed and was refined over three decades since it was first implemented in the year 1972 at the All India Level. Compared to any other method of data collection on a population of large carnivores, ‘Pugmark tracking’ is considered quick, involving about 10 days of ground preparation, 6 days of rigorous data collection, and about two to four weeks of data analysis. It is very cost-effective or economic, and all money spent in the process goes to local tribal people who act as assistants as they possess the skill to track animals in Indian jungles. It results in data which shows which forest beat possess how many, of what sex/age and which type of large carnivore. This brings a sense of responsibility among the guards, as none of the animals is ‘virtually’ generated through statistical interpretations. Like any study technique, Pugmark tracking also calls for sincerity for true reflection of structure and spatial distribution of the population of large carnivores.

== See also ==
- Animal track
- Spoor
- Singh, L. A. K. (2000): Tracking Tigers: Guidelines for Estimating Wild Tiger Population Using the Pugmark Technique. (Revised Edition). WWF Tiger Conservation Programme, New Delhi.
