= Delhi Ridge =

Park in New Delhi, India

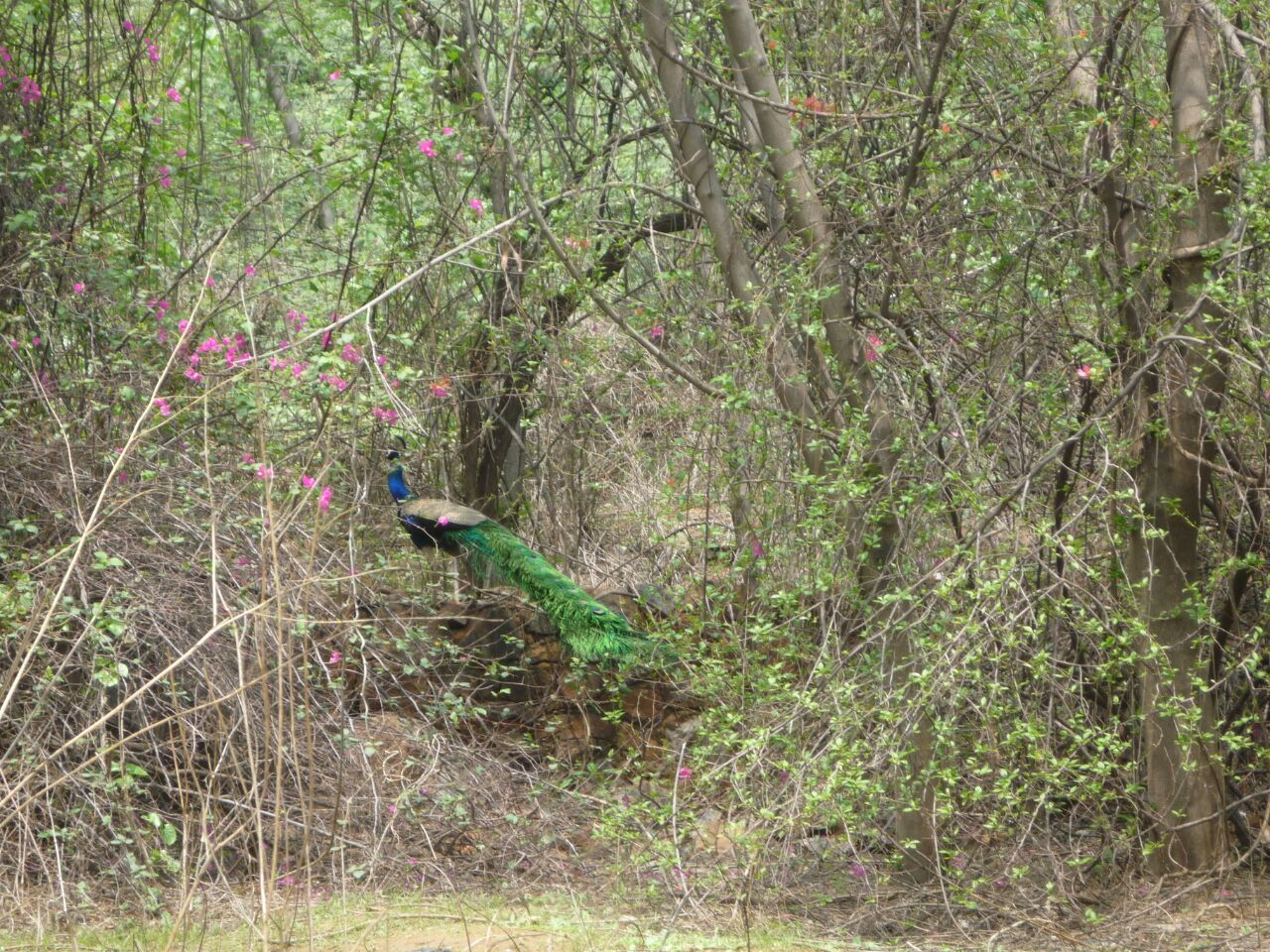
Forest area of Delhi Ridge

Delhi Ridge, sometimes simply called The Ridge, is a ridge in the Northern Aravalli leopard wildlife corridor in the National Capital Territory of Delhi in the New Delhi district, India. It is a northern extension of the ancient Aravalli Range, which is approximately 1.5 billion years old—significantly older than the Himalayas, which are "only" about 50 million years old. The Delhi Ridge consists of quartzite rocks and extends from the southeast at Tughlaqabad, near the Bhatti mines, branching out in places and tapering off in the north near Wazirabad on the west bank of the Yamuna River, spanning approximately 35 kilometres.

The Ridge acts as the "green lungs" for the city, and protects Delhi from the hot winds of the deserts of Rajasthan to the west. It has also enabled Delhi to be the world's second most bird-rich capital city, following Nairobi in Kenya.

Though modest in height, the Ridge serves as a watershed, separating the Indus Plain to the west from the Gangetic Plain to the east, within the larger Indo-Gangetic Plain.

== History ==
It is believed that the Aravallis are one of the oldest mountain ranges in India that evolved around 2.5 billion years ago during the Archaeozoic era. The range extends from Gujarat through Rajasthan to Haryana-Delhi. In Delhi, the spurs of the Aravallis are commonly collectively referred to as the Delhi Ridge, which is divided into the Northern, Central, South Central, and Southern Ridge.

In 1993, parts of north Delhi, central Delhi, south West Delhi and south Delhi covering 7,777 hectares was declared a reserve forest. Thereafter, between 1994 and 1996, a major part of the ridge was notified by the Government, thus stopping all construction.

Over the years, urban development, illegal or otherwise, has engulfed several sections of the Delhi Ridge. In many areas, landscaped public parks, public housing, and illegal tenements have sprouted. Furthermore, the area also witnesses dumping of construction waste.

== Geographical segments ==
Today, the Ridge has been divided into four separate zones for administrative ease, namely:

1. The Old Delhi or Northern Ridge refers to the hilly area near Delhi University and is the smallest segment of the Ridge. The location of the Northern Ridge is 28°40′52″N 77°12′57″E. Nearly 170 hectares were declared a Reserved Forest in 1915. Today, less than 87 hectares remain near Delhi University, and this area is being developed by the Delhi Development Authority as the Northern Ridge Biodiversity Park.
2. The New Delhi or Central Ridge was designated a Reserved Forest in 1914 and spans from the southern fringes of Sadar Bazaar to Dhaula Kuan. It originally spanned 864 hectares, though some portions have since gradually eroded.
3. The Mehrauli or South-Central Ridge is centred at "Sanjay Vana" near JNU and Vasant Kunj, and encompasses 633 hectares. Large chunks have been encroached and built upon. Approximately 70 hectares of this segment of the Ridge in the vicinity of Sainik Farm have been subsumed under the Tilpath Valley Biodiversity Park.
4. The Tughlaqabad or Southern Ridge sprawls across 6200 hectares and includes the Asola Bhatti Wildlife Sanctuary. This is the least urbanized of the four segments of the Ridge, though much of it comprises village-owned or privately owned farmland. This includes the forests of Bandhwari and Mangar Bani.

== Northern Ridge ==
Also referred to as the Kamala Nehru Ridge, it covers an area of 87 hectares and is located near the North Campus of Delhi University. The area consists of an eclectic blend of nature and history and houses the Northern Ridge Biodiversity Park developed and maintained by the Delhi Development Authority (DDA).

=== Historical monuments ===
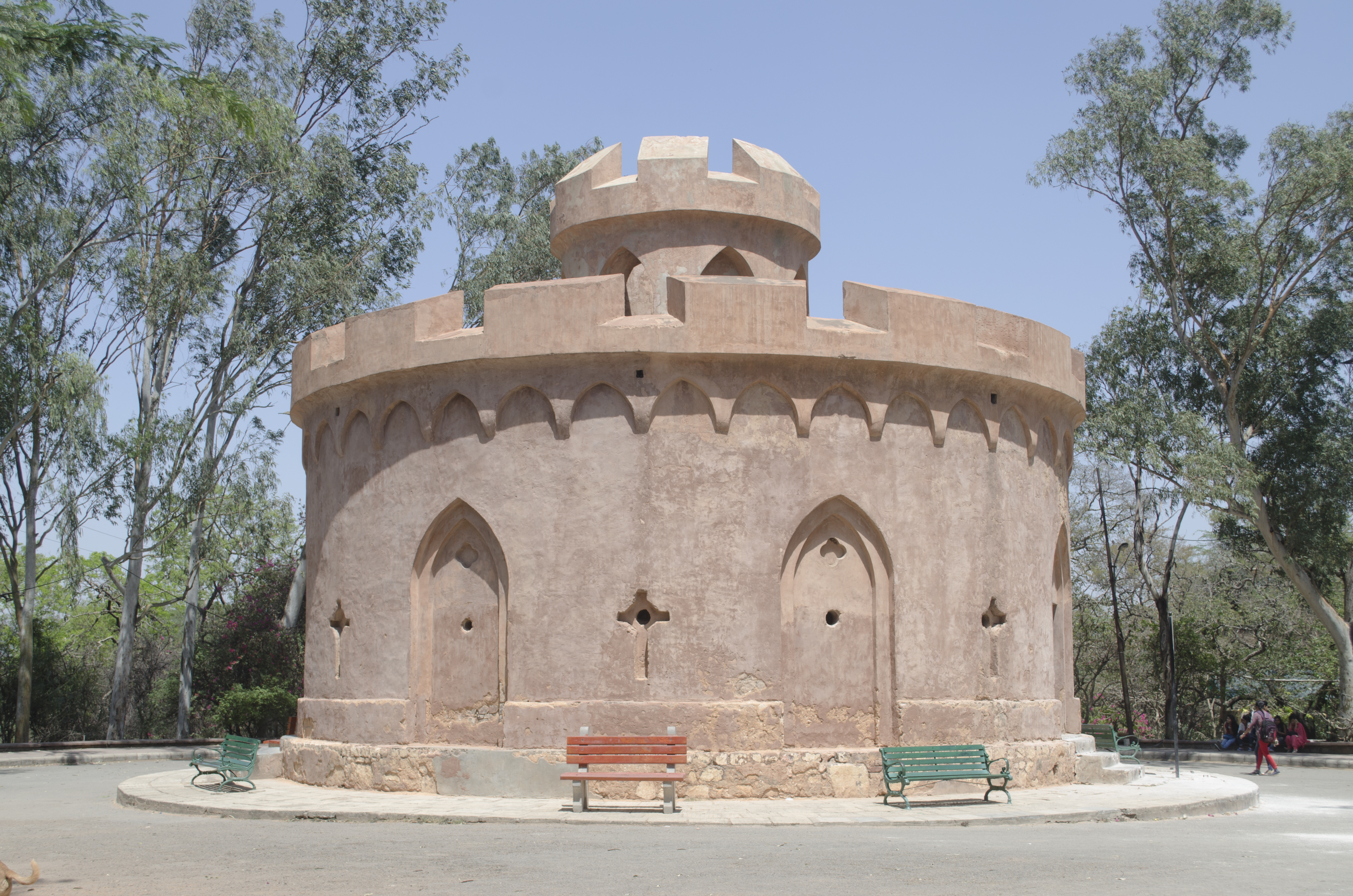
Flagstaff Tower

The North Ridge encompasses several monuments that date from as antiquated as the pre-Mughal era to the colonial British period.

1. Mutiny Memorial
2. Ashokan Pillar
3. Pir Ghaib (inside Hindu Rao Hospital)
4. Baoli (Step well) inside Hindu Rao Hospital
5. Chauburja Masjid
6. Flagstaff Tower
7. Eastern Guard House
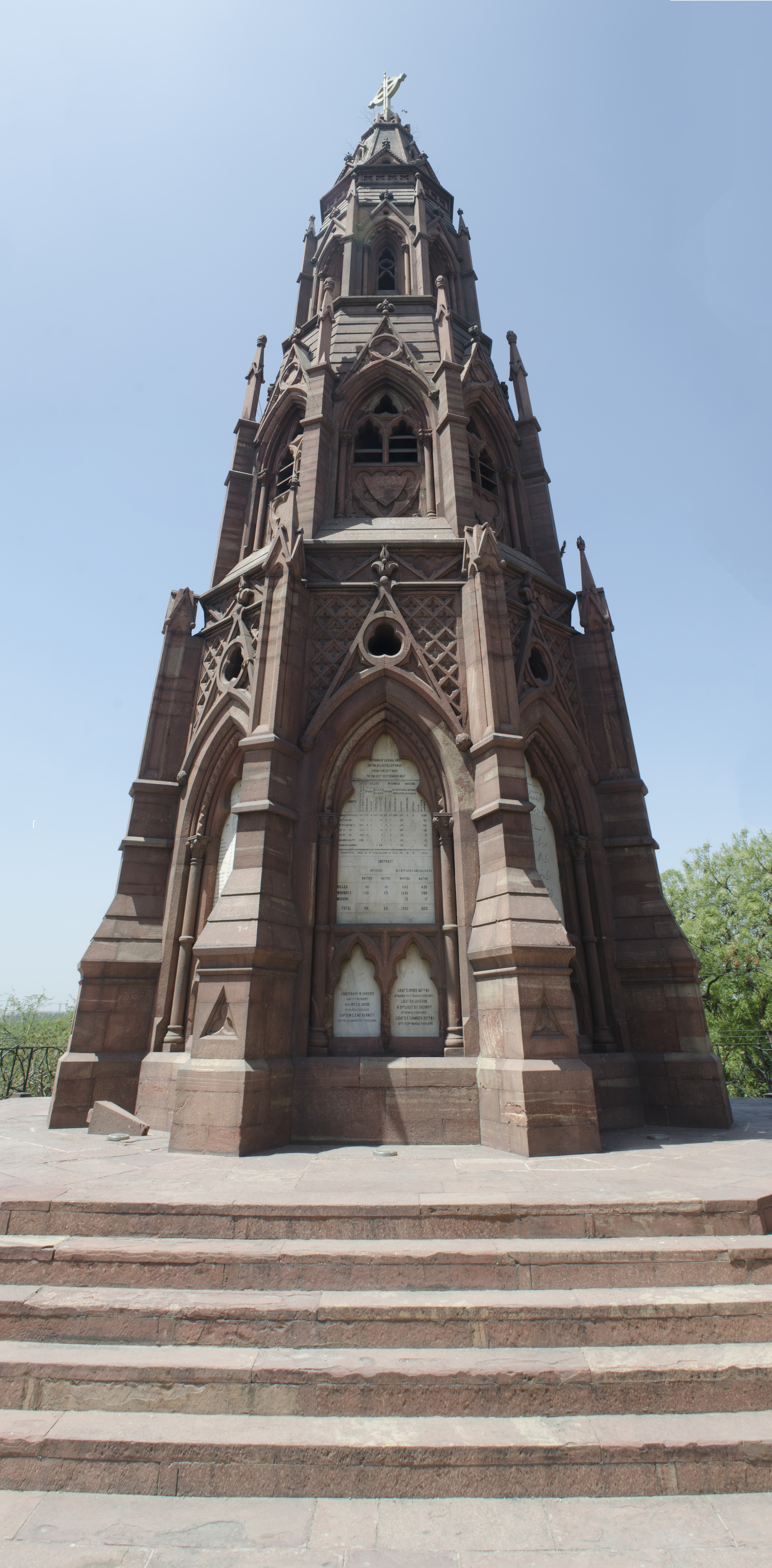
Mutiny Memorial

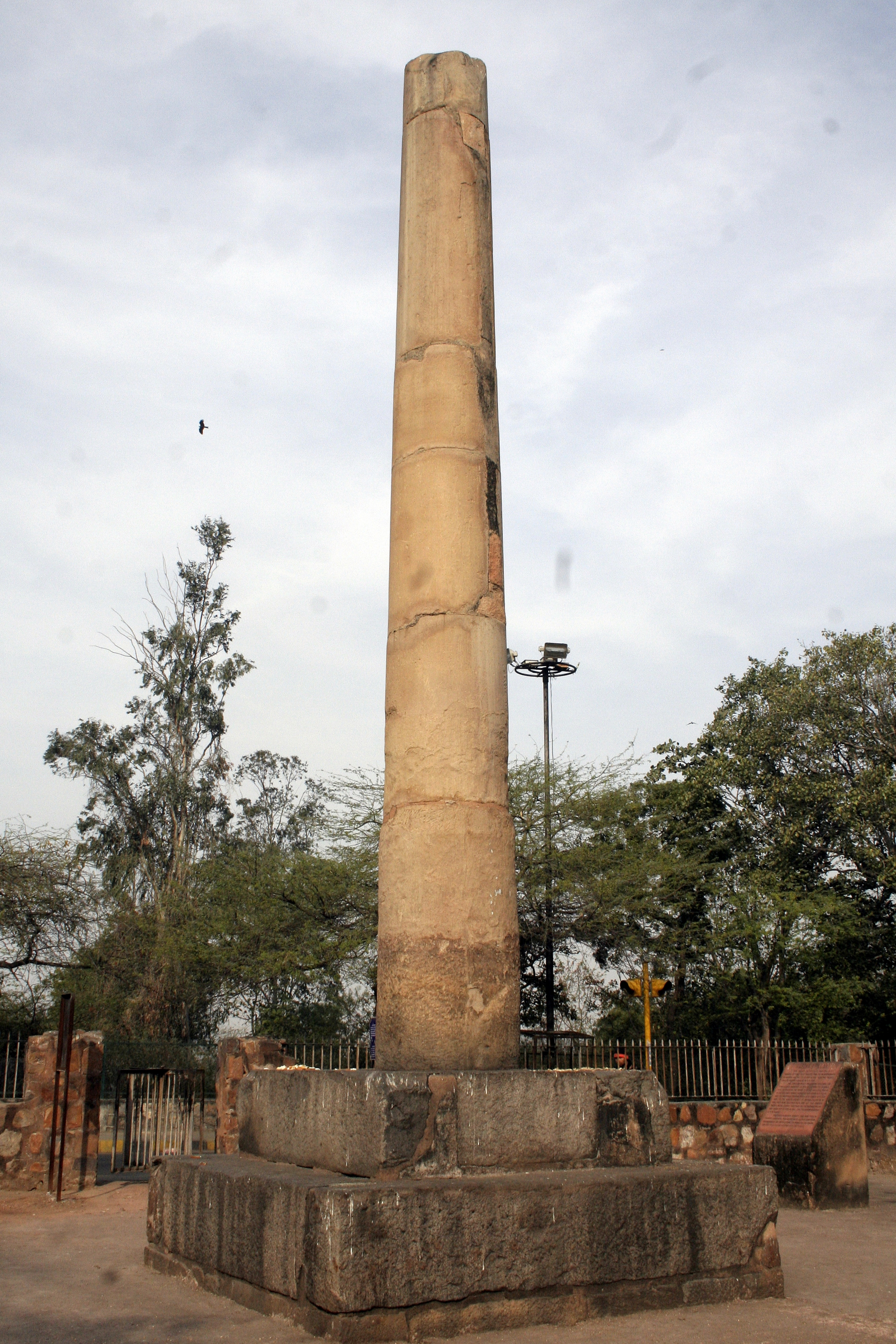
Delhi-Topra pillar, brought to Delhi from Topra Kalan by Firuz Shah Tughlaq in 1356

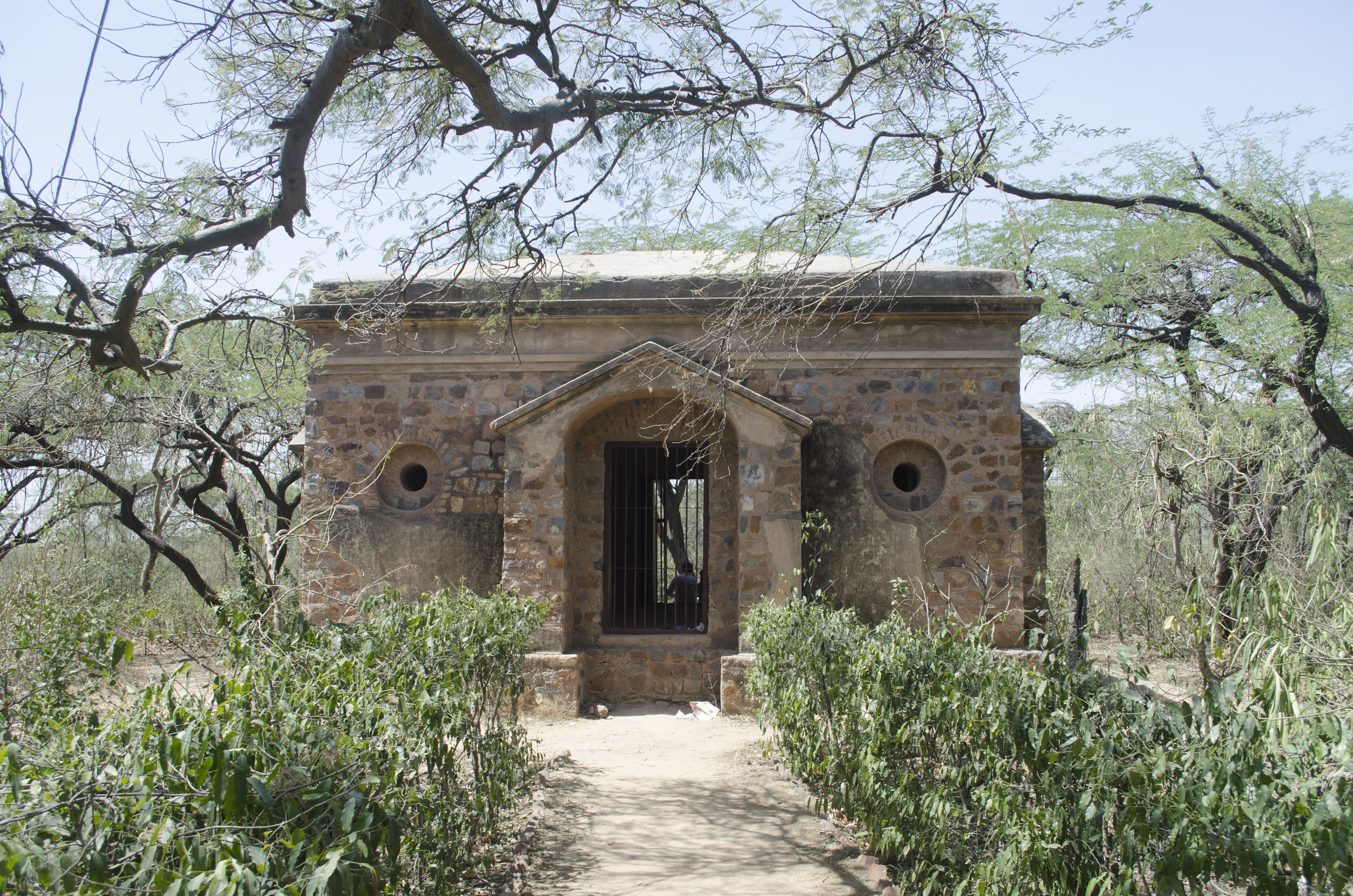
Southern Guard House

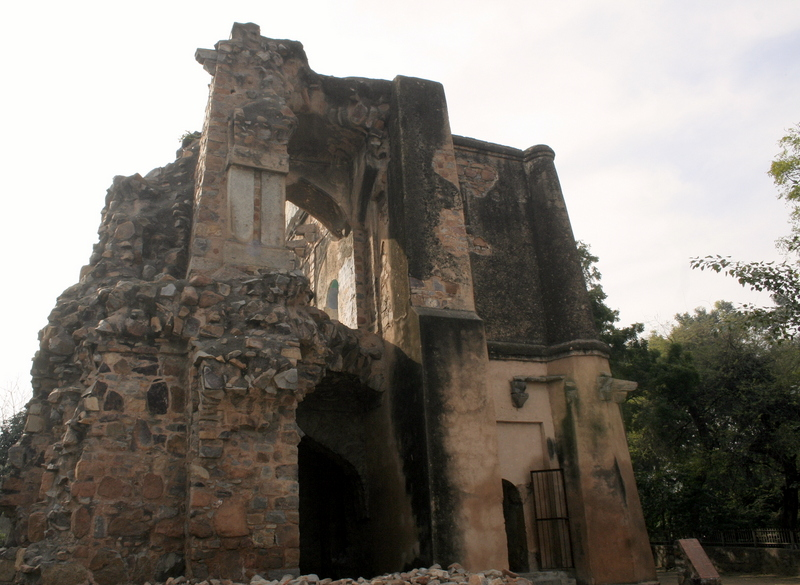
Pir Ghaib, a 14th-century hunting lodge and Observatory built by Feroz Shah Tughlaq

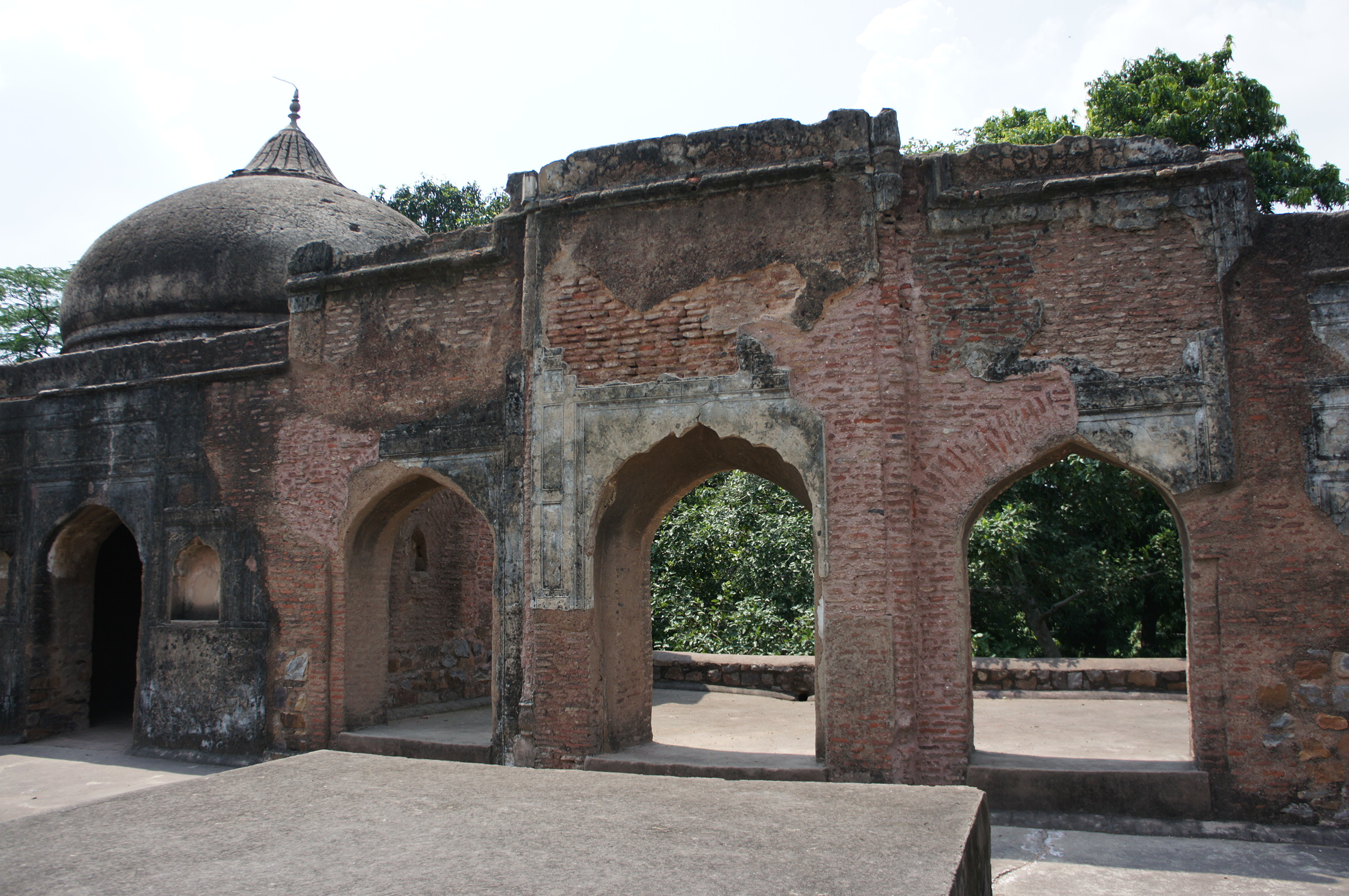
Chauburji Masjid

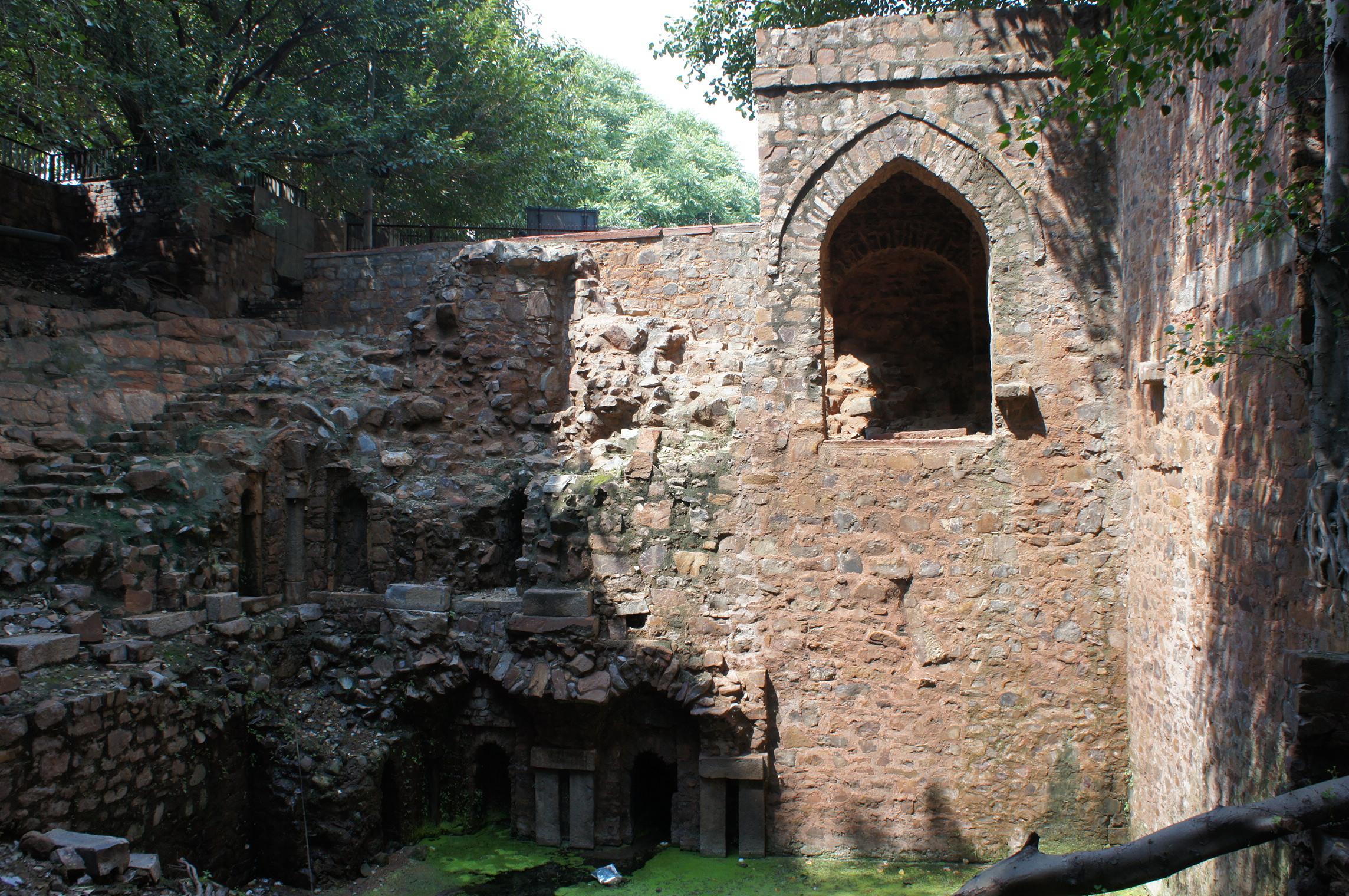
Baoli (Stepwell) inside Hindu Rao Hospital

== Central Ridge ==
The Central Ridge includes 864 hectares of forestry which were designated a Reserved Forest in 1914, and spans from the southern fringes of Sadar Bazaar to Dhaula Kuan.

=== Buddha Jayanti Park ===
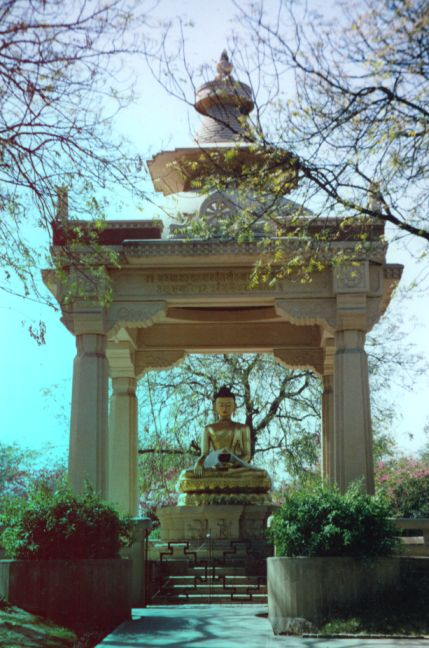
Buddha statue in the Buddha Jayanti Park

The Buddha Jayanti Smarak Park is situated in the central part of the Delhi Ridge in New Delhi, India. It occupies a stretch of almost a kilometre on the eastern section of Vandemataram Marg, also known as Upper Ridge Road. It was established on the 2500th anniversary of Gautama Buddha's enlightenment by Indian architect M. M. Rana. A sapling of the Bodhi Tree from Sri Lanka was planted here by the then Prime Minister of India Lal Bahadur Shastri on 25 October 1964.

On an artificial island in the park stands a pavilion housing a gilded Buddha statue, which was dedicated by the 14th Dalai Lama in October 1993. Each year in May, on the full moon day of Vaisakha, the Buddha Jayanti festival is celebrated here.

Neeraj Gupta, an Indian sculpture artist and environmentalist, is the president of Buddha Jayanti Park. In August 2023, Gupta organized a plantation program that resulted in the planting of 1,000 Cassia fistula (Amaltas) trees.

== South-Central Ridge ==
The South-Central Ridge encompasses 633 hectares of land. Large chunks have been encroached and built upon.

=== Aravalli Biodiversity Park ===
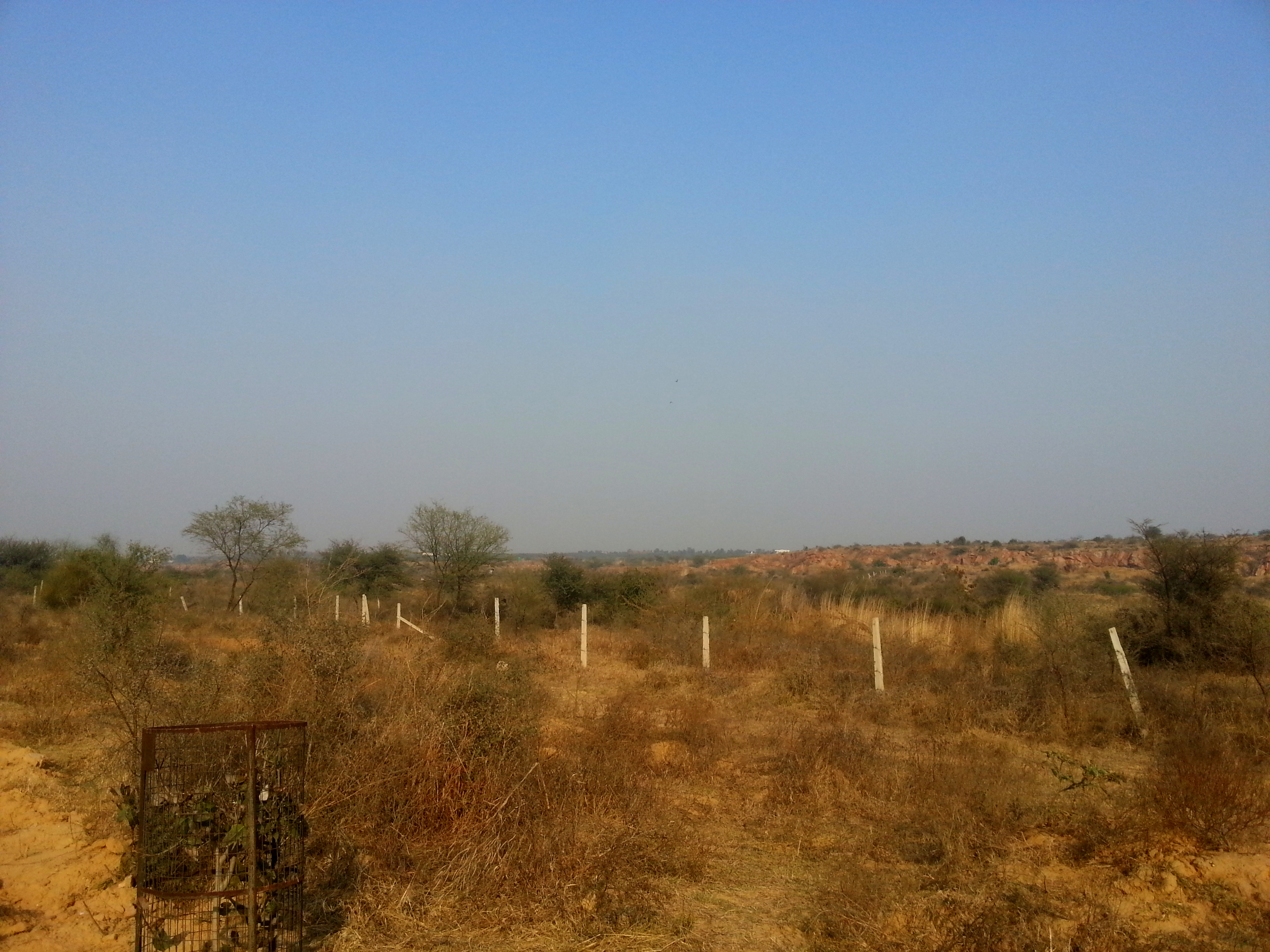
Aravalli Biodiversity Park, Gurgaon

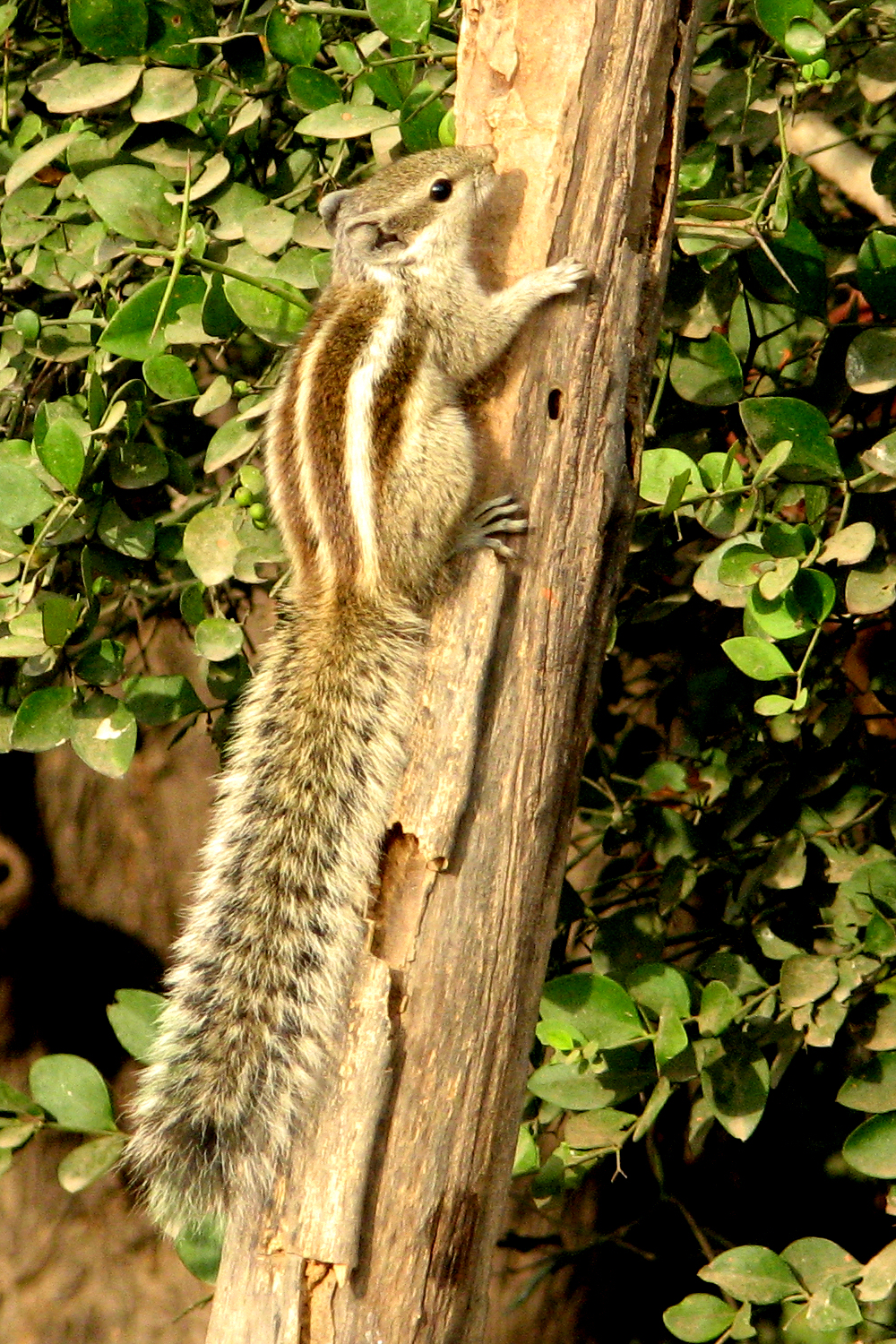
Northern Palm Squirrel in 'Aravalli Biodiversity Park', Delhi

Aravalli Biodiversity Park is an area spreading over 2.8 km^{2} (690 acres) on the South Central Delhi Ridge within the Aravalli Range. The area is enclosed by JNU, Mehrauli-Mahipalpur Road, National Highway 8, Vasant Kunj, Masoodpur, Palam road and the southern periphery of Vasant Vihar. DDA and the University of Delhi, under the auspices of the Biodiversity Parks Programme, collectively maintain the area. Each year, a substantial expenditure is spent on restoration, development, and maintenance.

The land that now comprises the Aravalli Biodiversity Park was once a mining site. Martha Shinde (Scindias) had a mining lease for the 2.3 km^{2} (0.89 sq mi) area. They plundered whatever they could. For years, Shinde exploited a panoply of forest resources including minerals, mica, sand, stone, rocks and water. The land, once abundant with a dense and lush forest, was eventually transformed into pits and hillocks due to relentless mining activities.

Scientists from the Centre for Environmental Management of Degraded Ecosystems (CEMDE) at the University of Delhi have reintroduced over 10 ecosystems, comprising more than 40 biotic communities. Portions of the Aravalli in the state of Gujarat are covered with natural dense forest. However, the land on which the Aravalli Biodiversity Park is being developed lacked natural forest growth due to extensive mining in the area. The CEMDE and DDA are reviving native flora and fauna of Aravalli hill ranges by undertaking plantation of native species like dhau (Anogeissus pendula), dhak (Butea monosperma), babul (Acacia nilotica) and kair (Capparis decidua). A rangeland with native grasses has been developed and a systematic planting program is underway; each year, native trees and bushes are planted to remove unwanted weeds, i.e. Prosopis juliflora. A conservatory of butterflies, orchidarium and fernery has been developed.

The Aravali Biodiversity Park, Gurgaon, on the Gurgaon-Delhi border, developed by the Municipal Corporation of Gurgaon, was inaugurated on 5 June 2010 on the occasion of the World Environment Day.

=== Neela Hauz Biodiversity Park ===
Neela Hauz Biodiversity Park, straddling Sanjay Van in the South Central Ridge, was restored between 2015 and 2016. In 2014, out of Delhi's 611 water bodies, 274 were considered dead, while the remaining were in poor condition. Neela Hauz, a freshwater lake, was gradually succumbing to the same fate owing to the dumping of waste. In ancient times, it served as the principal water source for the Rajput city of Qila Rai Pithora. Its basin was recharged by the extensive dense forests of Sanjay Van, with its overflow draining into the Yamuna River.

In 2014, the wetland was strewn with water hyacinth and the Ridge was infested with the invasive species of prosopis juliflora (Vilayati Babul or Kikar of Mexican origin), which were planted in the 1920s by the British to rehabilitate the wasteland. The silted-up lake faced encroachment and raw sewage inflow, prompting concerned citizens to obtain a Delhi High Court order for its restoration by the government. Following the commencement of restoration efforts in 2015, this biodiversity park was officially inaugurated in November 2016.

== Southern Ridge ==
Southern Ridge sprawls across 6200 hectares and includes the Asola Bhatti Wildlife Sanctuary, Bandhwari and Mangar Bani forests. This is the least urbanized of the four segments of the Ridge, though much of it consists of village-owned or privately owned farmland.

=== Asola Bhatti Wildlife Sanctuary ===
Asola Bhatti Wildlife Sanctuary is a 32.71 km^{2} biodiversity area in the South Ridge on the Delhi-Haryana border. It is considered a vital habitat for the Indian leopard. Endangered species in the sanctuary include the red-headed vulture and the Egyptian vulture: the Government of Haryana has constituted a vulture conservation program. Near-threatened species include painted stork, white-faced ibis and the European roller. Rare birds include black francolin and grey-headed fish eagle. Plant species include butea monosperma (dhak or flame of forest), anogeissus (dhok), Wrightia tinctoria (inderjao), Indian elm, neolamarckia cadamba (kadamba), prosopis cineraria (jaand), tinospora cordifolia (giloi), etc.

=== Mangar Bani forest ===
Mangar Bani, a Neolithic archaeological site and sacred grove hill forest on the Delhi-Haryana border, is in the South Delhi Ridge of the Aravalli mountain range in the Faridabad tehsil in the Indian state of Haryana.

It lies within the Northern Aravalli leopard wildlife corridor stretching from Sariska Tiger Reserve to Delhi. Historical sites in the vicinity of the sanctuary are Badkhal Lake, the 10th century Surajkund reservoir and Anangpur Dam, Damdama Lake, Tughlaqabad Fort and the ruins of Adilabad. It is contiguous to the seasonal waterfalls in Pali-Dhuaj-Kot villages of Faridabad, and the Asola Bhatti Wildlife Sanctuary. It is also an important wetland for the migratory birds as several dozen lakes formed in the abandoned open pit mines in and around the area.

Spanning 5,000 hectares, this is the largest prehistoric site and Stone Age tool-making factory in the Indian subcontinent and the first discovered site in the Aravalli range with cave paintings. The stone tools and rock art date back 100,000 years BP, while the cave paintings are estimated to be 20,000-40,000 years BP. It is also the oldest known site of human habitation in Haryana and the National Capital Region.

=== Tilpath Valley Biodiversity Park ===
Tilpath Valley Biodiversity Park, spread over 172 acres is a biodiversity area in the South Ridge, immediately northwest of Asola Bhatti Wildlife Sanctuary and south of Sainik Farm. Previously, the area had valleys scattered with sand-mined quarries and dried-up springs due to a lack of groundwater recharge. There was no natural forest cover, only invasive weed species like Prosopis juliflora, lantana, and parthenium. This was replaced with a three-layered forest community featuring native trees and plants such as mahua, haldu, sheesham and bael. Scrubland was restored to attract reptiles and birds. In 2015, 100,000 trees were planted with the help of 40,000 volunteers, followed by another 20,000 trees in 2016.

Wildlife surveys are conducted by tracking pugmarks using the Pug Impression Pad (PIP) method and by photographing wild animals. It now encompasses grasslands, hilly terrain, and a rich diversity of wildlife, with over 105 plant species, 103 bird species, 32 butterfly species, 15 species of herpetofauna (reptiles and amphibians), and eight mammalian species, including leopard, Indian rock python, jackals, neelgai, mongooses, porcupines, small Indian civet, gecko, Sirkeer malkoha, nightjar, Indian paradise flycatcher.

Following development that commenced in 2015, it was officially inaugurated as Delhi's third biodiversity park on February 3, 2018.

== Urban forests ==
In 2025, Delhi government announced the plan to develop 17 new urban forests totalling 177 acres including 2 Miyawaki forests.

- Miyawaki forests: both near Najafgarh and one of these will be named after Guru Tegh Bahadur.
1. Kharkhari Jatmal Forest, 2.44 hectares with 350,000 saplings of native species.
2. Jainpur Forest, 4.54 hectares.
- Urban forests in north and south Delhi.
  - South Delhi

1. Sathbari Urban Forest
2. Maidan Garhi Urban Forest

  - North Delhi

1. Shahpur Garhi Urban Forest
2. Alipur Urban Forest
3. Narela B4 Urban Forest
4. Mamurpur Urban Forest
5. Narela G7 Urban Forest
6. Narela G8 Urban Forest
7. Rohini Sector 30 Pehladpur Bagar Urban Forest
8. Rohini Sector 31 Pansali Urban Forest
9. Rohini Sector 32 Pansali Urban Forest
10. Rohini Sector 32 Urban Forest
11. Rohini Sector 32 Barwala Urban Forest
12. Rohini Mahamudpura Mazri A Urban Forest

== See also ==
- National Parks & Wildlife Sanctuaries of Haryana
- Wildlife of India
- Wildlife sanctuaries of India
- Talkatora Gardens
- List of parks in Delhi
