= Pug impression pad =

A pug impression pad (PIP) is made by preparing a layer of fine soil about 2 cm thick on forest paths so that animals will leave good footprint impressions. PIPs are widely used in India for the census of tigers. The first all-India tiger census in 1972 used this technique.

== Use ==
PIPs are located and sized so that animals using the path will walk over it and leave their spoor without being disturbed. A glass plate, about 25 by 30 centimetres (10 by 12 in), called a "tiger tracer" is then used to trace the outline of the pugmark that was left on the PIP. This tracing is then transferred to a protocol where over twenty pieces of information about the PIP, including the habitat, the pugmark, the direction of movement, etc., are recorded. Plaster casts may also be made from the tracks.

During 2002, in 71 tiger census units of Simlipal Tiger Reserve, 8946 PIPs were laid over 1773 km of tracking routes, from which 764 pugmark tracings were collected along with 316 plaster casts.

The PIPs are created in clusters of 2 or 3 along roads or at junctions of paths in a forest. Each PIP bears an identification number which is used during data analysis.

Beginners who wish to develop an interest in animal tracks and signs can create a few PIPs and monitor them daily. PIPs running alongside a garden fence can give a wealth of information through tracks and signs.

== Advantages ==
Some researchers have recently used camera traps in place of PIPs. The technique of using a PIP and pugmark tracking, however, has advantages in that PIPs can be created in large numbers and are available at low equipment cost. The method also provides employment to people living in and around tiger habitats who possess skill in laying PIPs and participating in animal tracking. PIPs can also be used for year-round monitoring of tigers. The only maintenance they require is to be wiped clean after each day's data are recorded. Forest guards set up the PIPs and record the data.

Nocturnal animals, not usually seen during the day, also leave their tracks on PIPs and information can be gathered about their distribution, density and activity.

== Disadvantages ==
Often, elephants find the PIPs attractive for a dust bath. PIPs are also damaged by strong winds, dew and rain. Therefore, PIPs need to be regularly monitored and maintained.
