= List of protected areas of Haryana =

The Haryana state of north India has 2 national parks, 8 wildlife sanctuaries, 2 wildlife conservation areas, 4 animal & bird breeding centers, 1 deer park and 50 herbal parks which are managed by the Forests Department of the Government of Haryana. Wildlife and forest areas of Haryana lies mainly in the foothills of Sivalik Hills range in the north and Aravalli Range in South Haryana. Aravalli mountains in Haryana are part of the Sariska to Delhi leopard wildlife corridor (including "Western-southern Haryana spur" which entails Satnali–Dadam–Tosha hill (ranges).

== Types of protected wildlife areas in Haryana ==
Hunting and poaching is illegal in all protected wildlife areas.

All rights of people within a National Park have to be resettled outside while rights over land can be allowed inside a Sanctuary. Grazing of livestock can be permitted inside a Sanctuary but not inside a National Park. A Sanctuary can be upgraded as a National Park. However a National Park cannot be downgraded as a Sanctuary. Wildlife National Parks, Sanctuaries and Conservation areas must remain free of roads, buildings, motorized equipment and mechanical transport.

== National parks ==
The Forests Department, Haryana of the Government of Haryana maintains two national parks:

Name of national park	Area	District & location	Hisar	Delhi	Chandigarh	Major wildlife supported
Sultanpur National Park	142.52 hectares	25 km from Gurugram, location map	158 km	44 km	305 km	Common hoopoe, paddyfield pipit, purple sunbird, little cormorant, Indian cormorant, common spoonbill, gray francolin, black francolin, Indian roller, white-throated kingfisher, spotbill, painted stork, black-necked stork, white ibis, black-headed ibis, little egret, great egret, cattle egret, crested lark, red-vented bulbul, rose-ringed parakeet, red-wattled lapwing, shikra, Eurasian collared dove, red-collared dove, laughing dove, spotted owlet, rock pigeon, magpie robin, greater coucal, weaver bird, bank mynah, common mynah and Asian green bee-eater.
Kalesar National Park	4682.32 hectares	15 km from Yamunanagar on Chhachhrauli road, location map	251 km	244 km	125 km	elephant, wild boar, sambhar, hare, red junglefowl, porcupine, monkey, chital

== Wildlife sanctuaries ==
The Forests Department of the Government of Haryana maintains the following Wildlife Sanctuaries:

Name of Wildlife Sanctuary	Area	District & Location	Hisar	Delhi	Chandigarh	Major Wildlife Supported
Bhindawas Wildlife Sanctuary	411.55 hectares	15 km away Jhajjar on Jhajjar Kasani road, http://wikimapia.org/4409240 map]	127 km	105 km	300 km	neelgai (bluebull), geedar (jackal), langur (Presbytis entellus) and bandar (rhesus macaque), blue peafowl (mor), rufous treepie (Dendrocitta vagabunda), greater coucal (Centropus sinensis), Indian grey hornbill (Ocyceros birostris), coppersmith barbet (Megalaima haemacephala)
Khaparwas Wildlife Sanctuary	82.70 hectares	8 km from Chhuchhkvas, Jhajjar district, map	128 km	80 km	300 km	neelgai (bluebull), geedar (jackal), blue peafowl (mor), rufous treepie (Dendrocitta vagabunda), greater coucal (Centropus sinensis), Indian grey hornbill (Ocyceros birostris), coppersmith barbet (Megalaima haemacephala)
Nahar Wildlife Sanctuary	211.35 hectares	5 km from Kosli on Kosali Mahendragarh road, Rewari district, Map	130 km	80 km	320 km	neelgai (bluebull), geedar (jackal), langur (Presbytis entellus) and bandar (rhesus macaque), blue peafowl (mor), rufous treepie (Dendrocitta vagabunda), greater coucal (Centropus sinensis), Indian grey hornbill (Ocyceros birostris), coppersmith barbet (Megalaima haemacephala)
Chhilchhila Wildlife Sanctuary	28.92 hectares	10 km from Bhoor Saiyda village, Kurukshetra district, map	150 km	100 km	160 km	blue peafowl (mor), rufous treepie (Dendrocitta vagabunda), greater coucal (Centropus sinensis), Indian grey hornbill (Ocyceros birostris), coppersmith barbet (Megalaima haemacephala)
Saraswati Wildlife Sanctuary	4482.85 hectares	10 km Pahowa (Kaithal district), location map	150 km	200 km	108 km	Wild boar (Sus scrofa), neelgai (bluebull), geedar (jackal), langur (Presbytis entellus) and bandar (rhesus macaque), blue peafowl (mor), rufous treepie (Dendrocitta vagabunda), greater coucal (Centropus sinensis), Indian grey hornbill (Ocyceros birostris), coppersmith barbet (Megalaima haemacephala)
Abubshahar Wildlife Sanctuary	11530.56 hectares	10 km from Mandi Dabwali on Dabavali-Sangariya road, Sirsa district, map	168 km	322 km	208 km
Khol Hi-Raitan Wildlife Sanctuary	2226.58 hectares	0.5 km from Panchkula on Morni road, Panchkula district, Map	235 km	250 km	20 km	Wild boar (Sus scrofa), neelgai (bluebull), geedar (jackal), langur (Presbytis entellus) and bandar (rhesus macaque), blue peafowl (mor), rufous treepie (Dendrocitta vagabunda), greater coucal (Centropus sinensis), Indian grey hornbill (Ocyceros birostris), coppersmith barbet (Megalaima haemacephala)
Bir Shikargah Wildlife Sanctuary	767.30 hectares	8 km from Pinjore on Mallah road, Panchkula district, Map	245 km	260 km	20 km	Wild boar (Sus scrofa), neelgai (bluebull), geedar (jackal), langur (Presbytis entellus) and bandar (rhesus macaque), blue peafowl (mor), rufous treepie (Dendrocitta vagabunda), greater coucal (Centropus sinensis), Indian grey hornbill (Ocyceros birostris), coppersmith barbet (Megalaima haemacephala)
Asola Bhatti Wildlife Sanctuary	3271 hectares	Surajkund, Bandhwari, Gwal Pahari	240 km	20 km	240 km	leopard (Sus scrofa), neelgai (bluebull), geedar (jackal), bandar (rhesus macaque), blue peafowl (mor), red-headed vulture, egyptian vulture, painted stork, white-faced ibis, european roller, black francolin and grey-headed fish eagle.

== Conservation areas ==
Name of Conservation area
Area
District & Location
Hisar
Delhi
Chandigarh
Major Wildlife Supported
Bir Bara Ban Wildlife Sanctuary
419.26 hectares or 4.2 km^{2}
5 km from Jind, location map
70 km
144 km
182 km
Neelgai (bluebull), geedar (jackal), langur (Presbytis entellus) and bandar (rhesus macaque), blue peafowl (mor), rufous treepie (Dendrocitta vagabunda), greater coucal (Centropus sinensis), Indian grey hornbill (Ocyceros birostris), coppersmith barbet (Megalaima haemacephala)
Chadhuriwali Community Reserve
144-acre (58 hectares or 0.6 km^{2})
In Hisar district, 35 km west of Hisar
35 km
210 km
270 km

Flora: The flora of the Bir Hisar area, including the newly designated Chaudhariwali Community Reserve, is a representative example of a semi-arid, dry deciduous forest typical of the region. The vegetation is well-adapted to the local climate, with a mix of indigenous and planted species. Dominant native trees found in the area include Khejri (Prosopis cineraria), Desi Kikar (Acacia nilotica), and Ker (Capparis decidua). These species are crucial to the local ecosystem, providing food and shelter for wildlife while also having cultural and medicinal significance. The vegetation also includes a variety of shrubs, herbs, and grasses that contribute to the overall biodiversity. The recent declaration of the Chaudhariwali Community Reserve aims to protect these native plant species and prevent land-use changes that could harm the ecosystem.

Fauna: Bir Hisar provides a vital habitat for a variety of mammals, reptiles, and birds. The area's status as a protected reserve has been a significant step in conserving its animal population.

Mammals: The reserve is home to several species of mammals. Key species include blackbucks (Antilope cervicapra), a protected species often found in the open plains of Haryana. Other notable mammals recorded in the area are desert foxes (Vulpes vulpes pusilla), wild cats, jackals (Canis aureus), and various species of deer. The presence of these animals highlights the importance of the reserve in providing a sanctuary for wildlife in an otherwise agriculturally dominated landscape.

Reptiles: The dry, scrubland environment of Bir Hisar is also suitable for reptiles. The reserve is known to be a habitat for spiny-tailed lizards and various species of turtles. These reptiles play a crucial role in the local food web and are indicators of the ecosystem's health.

Birds: The region is a significant area for birdlife, attracting both resident and migratory species. A prominent resident bird is the Indian Peafowl (Pavo cristatus), which is frequently sighted. Other avian species, including various ground birds and smaller songbirds, also thrive in the diverse flora of the sanctuary. The Hisar district as a whole is known for its avifaunal diversity, with a variety of bird species recorded in and around its forested areas.

Shri Guru Jambheshwar Chinkara Community Reserve
68-acre (27 hectares or 0.3 km^{2})
In Fatehabad district (Kajalheri), 35 km northwest of Hisar Airport
35 km
200 km
210 km
Shri Guru Jambheshwar Chinkara Community Reserve is a protected area located in the Fatehabad district of Haryana. It was officially declared by the Haryana government to protect the region's unique biodiversity, with the active participation of the local community.

Location and Area: The reserve is situated in Kajalheri village in the Hisar district. It covers an area of 68 acres. The local Bishnoi community, which holds a strong tradition of environmental protection, has been instrumental in the conservation of the wildlife in this area for decades.

Primary Species and Conservation Focus: The reserve is a vital habitat for several species, with a particular focus on the Indian softshell turtle (Nilssonia gangetica) and blackbucks (Antilope cervicapra). The softshell turtle, which is listed as endangered by the IUCN, thrives in the village pond, which is a key part of the reserve. The area's status as a Community Reserve provides a legal framework to formalize and strengthen the conservation efforts of the local community.

Saraswati Wildlife Sanctuary
4482.85 hectares
10 km Pehowa (Kaithal district), location map
150 km
200 km
108 km
Wild boar (Sus scrofa), neelgai (bluebull), geedar (jackal), langur (Presbytis entellus) and bandar (rhesus macaque), blue peafowl (mor), rufous treepie (Dendrocitta vagabunda), greater coucal (Centropus sinensis), Indian grey hornbill (Ocyceros birostris), coppersmith barbet (Megalaima haemacephala)
Mangar Bani
265 hectares or 2.7 km^{2}
In Faridabad district, 5 km from Gurugram
170 km
20 km
280 km
Leopard, geedar (jackal), langur (Presbytis entellus) and bandar (rhesus macaque), blue peafowl (mor), rufous treepie (Dendrocitta vagabunda), greater coucal (Centropus sinensis), Indian grey hornbill (Ocyceros birostris), coppersmith barbet (Megalaima haemacephala)

== Animal and bird breeding centers ==
The Forests Department of the Government of Haryana runs the following:

Name of Conservation Area	Area	District & Location	Hisar	Delhi	Chandigarh	Major Wildlife Supported
Chinkara Breeding Centre Kairu, Bhiwani	24 hectares	26 km Bahal and 32 km from Bhiwani on Bahal-Bhiwani road in Kairu village in Bhiwani district, location map	60 km	308 km	155 km	Chinkara, blue peafowl (mor)
Crocodile Breeding Centre, Kurukshetra, Bhaur Saidan (Kurukshetra)	hectares	km 22 km from Kurukshetra and 13 km from Thanesar at Bhor Saidan village on the Kurukshetra-Pehowa road, one of the pilgrimage sites in Kurukshetra, Bhore-saidaan Bhureeshwar Temple location map	152 km	115 km	191 km	Mugger crocodiles
Black Buck Breeding Centre, Pipli Mini Zoo, Kurukshetra	10.92hectares	Pipli is 2 km from Kurukshetra, location map	165 km	90 km	161 km	Tiger - 1, Blackbuck - 10, Bonnet macaque - 5, Chital (spotted deer), Indian hog deer - 1, Gray langur - 2, Barking deer - 2, Guineafowl - 4, Silver pheasant - 2, Fantail pigeon - 5, Cockatiel - 6, Mugger - 2
Elephant rescue and rehabilitation centre, Kalesar	?? hectares	Kalesar forest	265 km	30 km	275 km	Common sparrow	Rehabilitation of rescued abused elephants
Leopard breeding centre, Gurugram	810 hectares	Gurugram, near sector 76	200 km	310 km	50 km	leopard and deer
Peacock & Chinkara Breeding Centre, Jhabua, in Rewari district	?? hectares	Jhabua village in Rewari district, Rewari city location map	175 km	315 km	90 km	Chinkara and blue peafowl (mor)
Pheasant Breeding Centre, Morni in Panchkula district	?? hectares	Barwala village 22 km from Panchkula, location map	220 km	30 km	245 km	Several types of pheasants are bred, including red junglefowl (Gallus gallus), endangered cheer pheasant (Catreus wallichii) and endangered kalij pheasant. The centre has a program for breeding and releasing birds into the wild. Six aviaries and a walk-in aviary have been constructed for breeding of the pheasants.
Sparrow Rescue and Research Centre (SRRCP) at Jatayu Conservation Breeding Centre, Pinjore.	?? hectares	Barwala village 22 km from Panchkula, location map	265 km	30 km	275 km	Common sparrow
Vulture Conservation and Breeding Centre, Pinjore	2.02 hectares	located within the Bir Shikargah Wildlife Sanctuary, which is 8 km away from Pinjore on Pinjor-Mallah Road. It is 10 km from Kalka, 20 km from Panchkula, 30 km from Chandigarh, 20 km from Morni Hill station. Jatayu Conservation and Breeding Centre (JCBC) location map	265 km	30 km	275 km	Indian vulture

== Deer parks ==
The Forests Department of the Government of Haryana runs one deer park:

Name of Conservation Area	Area	District & Location	Hisar	Delhi	Chandigarh	Major Wildlife Supported
Deer Park, Hisar	19 hectares	Deer Park is located next to Hisar Airport and Blue Bird Lake on Hisar-Dhansu Road at Hisar. The Deer Park is next to Shatavar Vatika Herbal Park, Hisar. Both are run by the Forests Department, Haryana of Government of Haryana, location map	0 km	177 km	238 km	Chital spotted deer, Sambar and Blackbuck (nil gai) Antelope

== Herbal parks ==
The Forests Department of Government of Haryana has 59 herbal parks

- Chandan Vatika Herbal Park, Jind - DC Colony near Red Cross Office on Gohana Road Jind City, Haryana
- Shatavar Vatika Herbal Park, Hisar - Asparagus racemosus herbal park near Deer Park, Hisar on Hisar-Dhansu Road in Bir Hisar (बिड़ हिसार), Hisar, Haryana
- Ch. Surender Singh Memorial Herbal Park, Tosham, on Hisar-Bhiwani road in Tosham, Bhiwani district
- Ch. Surender Singh Memorial Herbal Park, Kairu, on Bahal-Bhiwani road in Kairu village near Bahal in Bhiwani district. Kairu village is also the location of Chinkara Breeding Centre Kairu, Bhiwani
- Ch. Devi Lal Herbal Nature Park, Tajewal, Yamunanagar district, location map, co-ord: 30°16'14"N 77°29'11"E

== Zoos and safaris ==
- Mini Zoo, Bhiwani
- Rohtak Zoo within Tilyar Lake complex
- Mini Zoo & Black Buck Breeding Centre, Pipli
- Gurugram leopard and deer safari, proposed in 1000 acre city forest near sector 76 at Sakatpur and Garat Pur Bas villages in Aravalli hills of Gurugram, in September 2019 panchayat had already approved the transfer of panchayat common land to the wildlife department. See also Northern Aravalli leopard and wildlife corridor and Leopards of Haryana.

== Other potential wildlife sanctuaries and conservation Areas ==
Important wetland, water sheds and forested areas of Haryana

- Blue Bird Lake in Hisar, the location map.
- Bhakra Dam
- Bawal HSIDC wetland
- Dhosi Hill
- Nuh and Ferozepur Jhirka hill forest
- Hathni Kund Barrage
- Kaushalya Dam at Pinjore in Panchkula district on Kaushalya river.
- Madhogarh hill forest
- Masani barrage wetland
- Tajewala Barrage
- Tosham Hill range
- Surajkund forest

== See also ==
- List of zoos in India
- List of national parks of India
- Wildlife sanctuaries of India
- List of Monuments of National Importance in Haryana
- List of State Protected Monuments in Haryana
- List of Indus Valley Civilisation sites
- Tosham rock inscription
- Haryana Tourism Corporation
- Administrative divisions of Haryana
