= Blue Bird Lake =

- Lake and Migratory Birds
- Location in Haryana, India Blue Bird Lake (India)
- Coordinates: 29°10′46″N 75°43′7″E
- Country: India
- State: Haryana
- District: Hisar
- Established: 1970
- Founder: Forests Department, Haryana
- Time zone: UTC+5:30 (IST)
- Telephone code: +91-(01662)-275568/275131
- Website: Official website

Blue Bird Lake, Hisar, is a resident and endangered migratory bird wetland habitat, lake and recreation area in the town of Hisar, in the Hisar district of Haryana State, India. Blue Bird Lake is close to Hisar Airport on NH-9 in Hisar, Haryana. It is close to Deer Park, Hisar and Shatavar Vatika Herbal Park, Hisar, both of which are run by the Forests Department, Haryana of Government of Haryana.

== History ==
In 1995, the Blue Bird Lake complex was established on 52 acre, including 18 acre for the lake, and rest for the forest, patrol pump, Haryana Tourism's Blue Bird Tourist Resort.

== Migratory birds ==
Among approximately 1,800 migratory bird species out of total 10,000 species of birds in the world, nearly 370 species migrate to India due to seasonal changes, including 175 long-distance migration species that use the Central Asian Flyway route, and among those some of these migratory birds species have been sighted nesting here during the winter, many of which are endangered species.

The lake is also leased out for the commercial fisheries by Fisheries Department of Government of Haryana.

== Attractions and facilities ==
The lake and surrounding wetland and parks are spread across 52 acres. The lake itself is 10 acres and has small islands where migratory birds and other flora and fauna live and nest.

There are boats available for hire, along with safety gear such as life saving flotation jackets and devices. The lake has floating pontoon platforms for visitors and boaters, and ghats for sitting and relaxing. Recreational fishing is permitted with payment of a licensing fee. Landscaped parks, sight-seeing walking trails and jogging tracks, over-water bridges, bush land, children's swings and play area, visitor's car park and toilets, and other amenities are available. There is no entry fee to use these areas. The Blue bird lake also has government-run "Blue Bird Tourist Resort" with rooms, conference halls, restaurant and bar. The annual contract for the fish farming and boating services for the tourists is awarded based on the open tender. Rental motorboats and paddle boats usually cost ₹75-100 per person as of 2025.

== Conservation issues ==
Air, sound and water pollution, lack of water supply and conservation, lack of protected area status and scientific wildlife management plan for wildlife conservation, lack of area development with scientific landscaping and tree planting conducive to safe birds nesting and breeding, stray dogs and cats posing risk to nesting endangered birds, poor hygiene resulting in ongoing risk of avian flu outbreak, etc. remain major issues.

Since there is no agreement between Haryana Tourism that manages the wetland and HLRDC in control of canal that irrigates their farm in the vicinity of wetland, HLRDC stopped the supply of their share of water flowing to Blue bird lake, causing gradual reduction of water levels in the wetland which resulted in death of fishes in 2016.

Over 800 domesticated ducks resident at blue bird lake were culled by the authorities in November 2016 when 9 dead ducks were found that were confirmed to have died due to H5N8 avian influenza virus.

== Nearby attraction ==
- Shatavar Vatika Herbal Park, Hisar is next to the Deer Park on Dhansu Road
- Kanwari Indus Valley Mound at Kanwari
- Tosham rock inscription at Tosham
- Asigarh Fort at Hansi
- Firoz Shah Palace Complex
- Pranpir Badshah tomb at Hisar
- Mahabir Stadium
- Deer Park, Hisar
- Haryana Tourism

== See also ==
- National Parks & Wildlife Sanctuaries of Haryana
- Indian Council of Forestry Research and Education
- Arid Forest Research Institute
- Okhla Sanctuary, bordering Delhi in adjoining Uttar Pradesh
- Najafgarh drain bird sanctuary, Delhi
- Najafgarh lake or Najafgarh jheel (Now completely drained by Najafgarh drain)
- National Zoological Park Delhi
- Asola Bhatti Wildlife Sanctuary, Delhi
- Bhalswa horseshoe lake, Delhi
- Bhindawas Wildlife Sanctuary
- Basai wetland
- Haryana Tourism
- List of Monuments of National Importance in Haryana
- List of State Protected Monuments in Haryana
- List of Indus Valley Civilization sites in Haryana, Punjab, Rajasthan, Gujarat, India & Pakistan
- List of national parks of India
- Wildlife sanctuaries of India
