= Shatavar Vatika Herbal Park, Hisar =

Shatavar Vatika Herbal Park
- Herbal Park
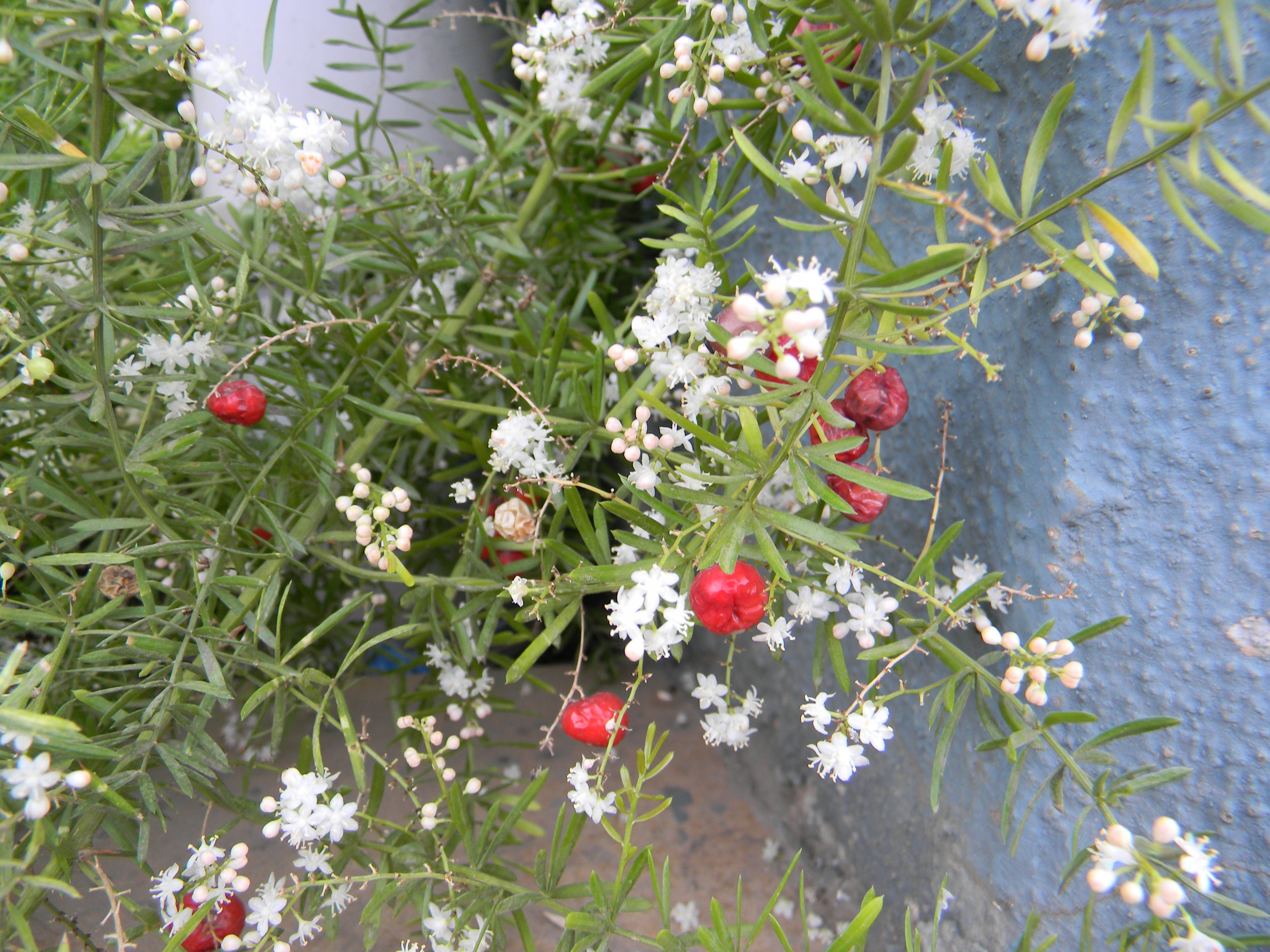
- Shatavar

- Location in Haryana, India Shatavar Vatika Herbal Park (India)
- Coordinates: 29°11′27″N 75°45′32″E
- Country: India
- State: Haryana
- District: Hisar
- Established: 2008
- Founder: Forests Department, Haryana

Languages
  - Official: Hindi
- Time zone: UTC+5:30 (IST)
- Telephone code: 01662
- Website: haryanaforest.gov.in

The Shatavar Vatika Herbal Park, Hisar, named after the shatavar herb, is a 125-acre herbal park for the conservation of several endangered ayurvedic medicinal herbs. It is located on Hisar-Dhansu road, which runs off 'Hisar-Barwala NH-52', in Hisar city of Haryana state in India.

The Shatavar Vatika Herbal Park is located 1 km northeast of Deer Park, both located on the 'Hisar-Dhansu link road' are run by the Forests Department of Government of Haryana. Vatika is 6 km away from Hisar Bus Stand and 7 km away from Hisar Railway Station.

Hisar Airport and Blue Bird Lake are also nearby.

== Etymology ==
The park is named after the Shatavar (Asparagus racemosus) herb.

== Details of the herbal park ==
=== Objectives of the herbal park ===
The 125 acre herbal park, setup in 2008–09, aims to preserve and propagate the endangered herbs. it also aims to educate people and farmers in commercial cultivation of these herbs to engage in profitable pursuits.

=== Herbs at park ===
The Forests Department, Haryana has planted several Ayurvedic medicinal herbs at the park including Ashvagandha (Indian Ginseng), Sarpagandha (Rauvolfia serpentina), Gwarpatha (Aloe vera), Mulethi (Liquorice), Shatavar (Asparagus racemosus), Brahmibooti (Centella asiatica), Chitrak (Plumbago), Baansa (Justicia adhatoda), Rosha Ghas (Cymbopogon martinii) - type of lemon grass, Akarkara (Anacyclus pyrethrum root) and Lehsunbel, etc., would be planted in the herbal garden.

== Visitor facilities at park ==
The park has several visitor facilities, including lawns and swings for the kids, an observation watch tower, auditorium to showcase nature and environment related movies, public hall, collection of books on ayurveda, naturopathy and uses of medicinal herbs, etc.

== Gallery ==
Representative pictures of herbs found at Hisar Herbal park.

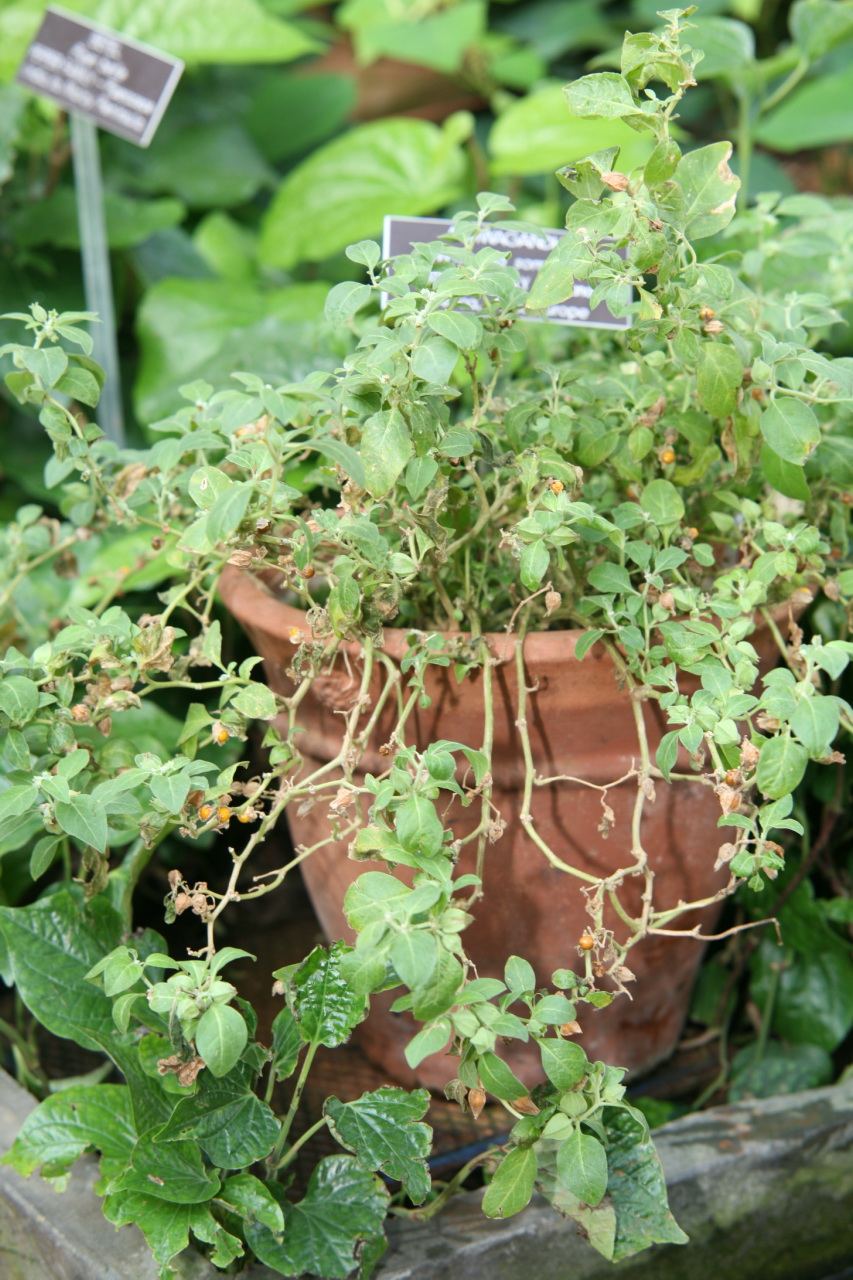
Ayurvedic Herb Ashvagandha (Indian Ginseng) (Withania somnifera)

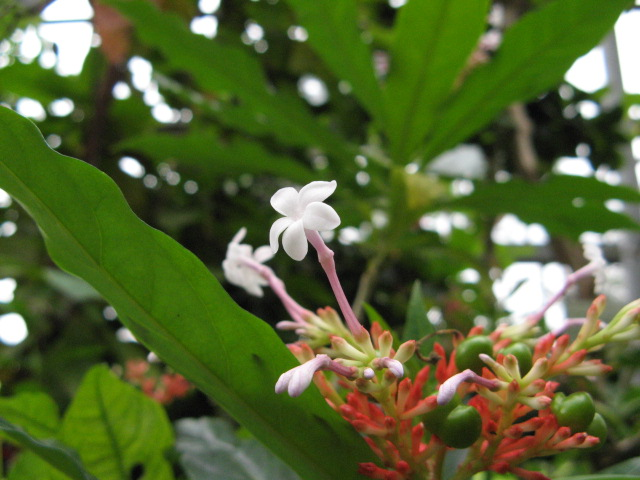
Ayurvedic Herb Sarpagandha (Rauvolfia serpentina)

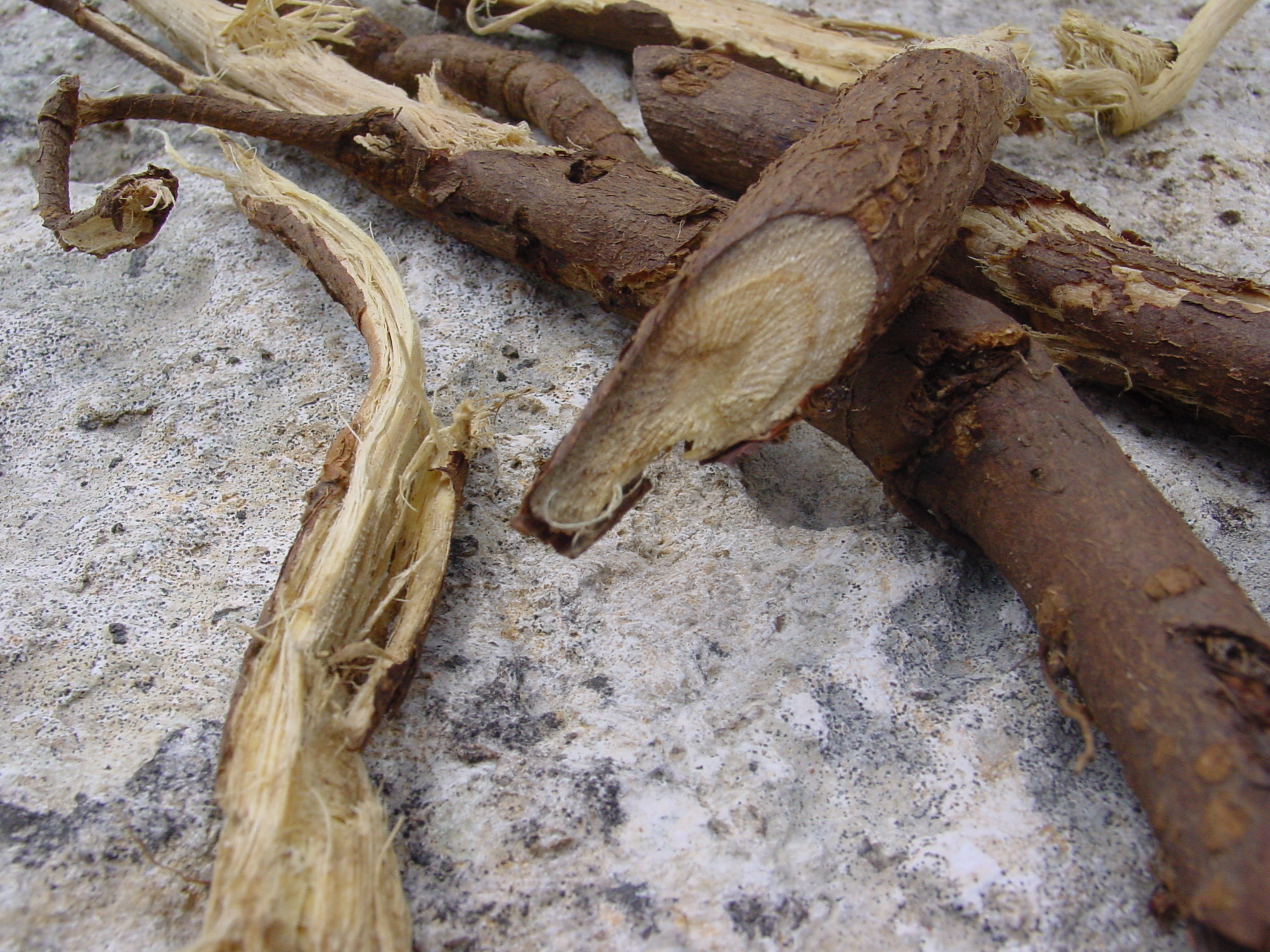
Ayurvedic Herb Mulethi (Liquorice) roots with bark

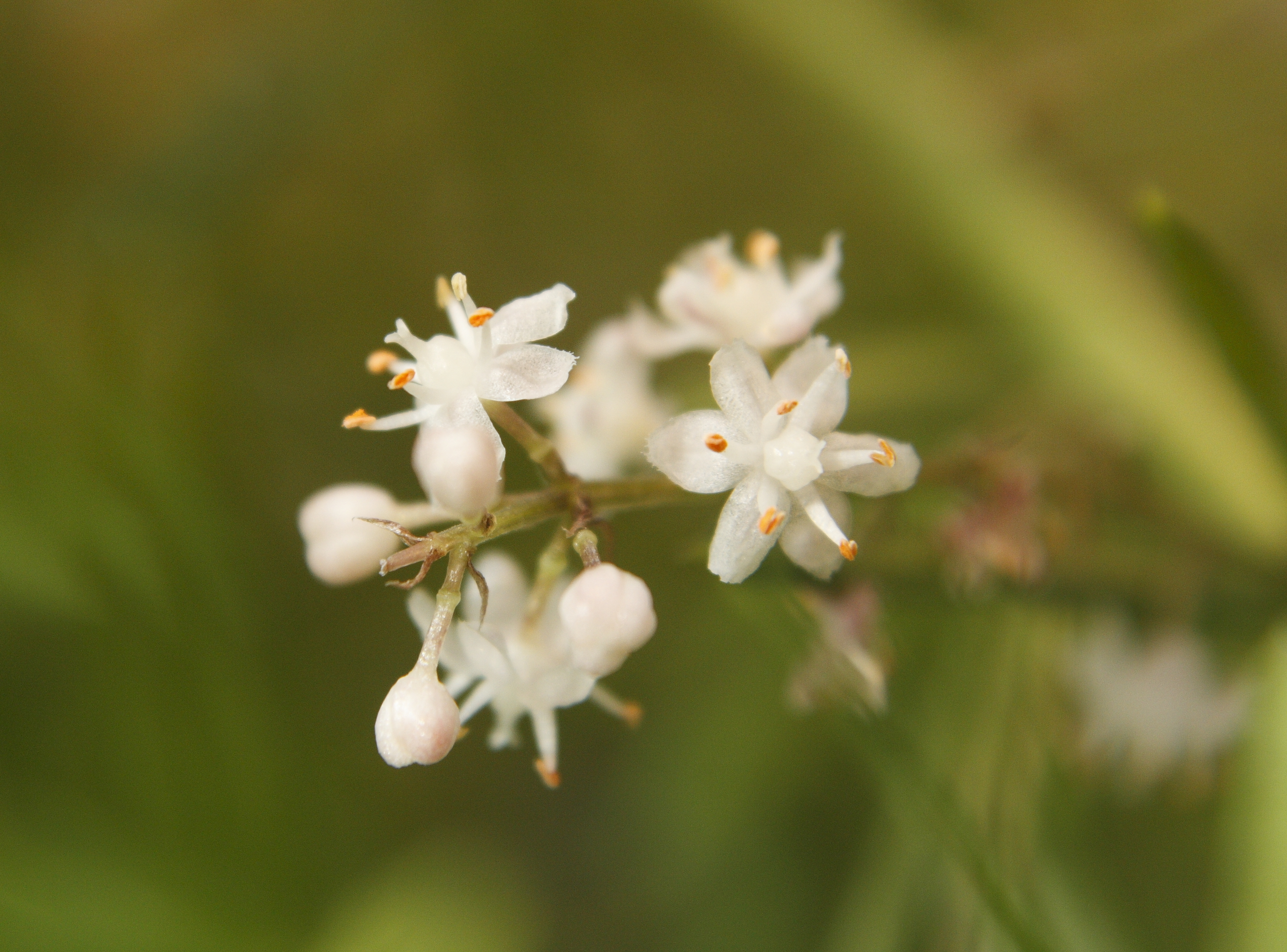
Flowers of Ayurvedic Herb Shatavar (Asparagus racemosus)

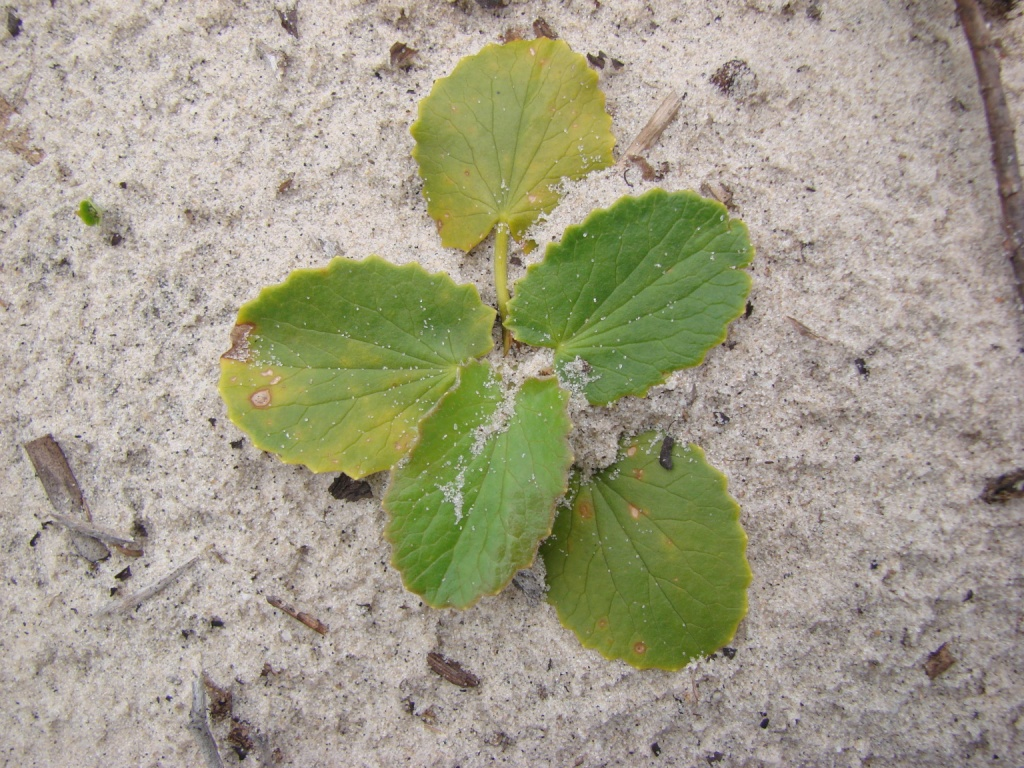
Brahmibooti (Centella asiatica)

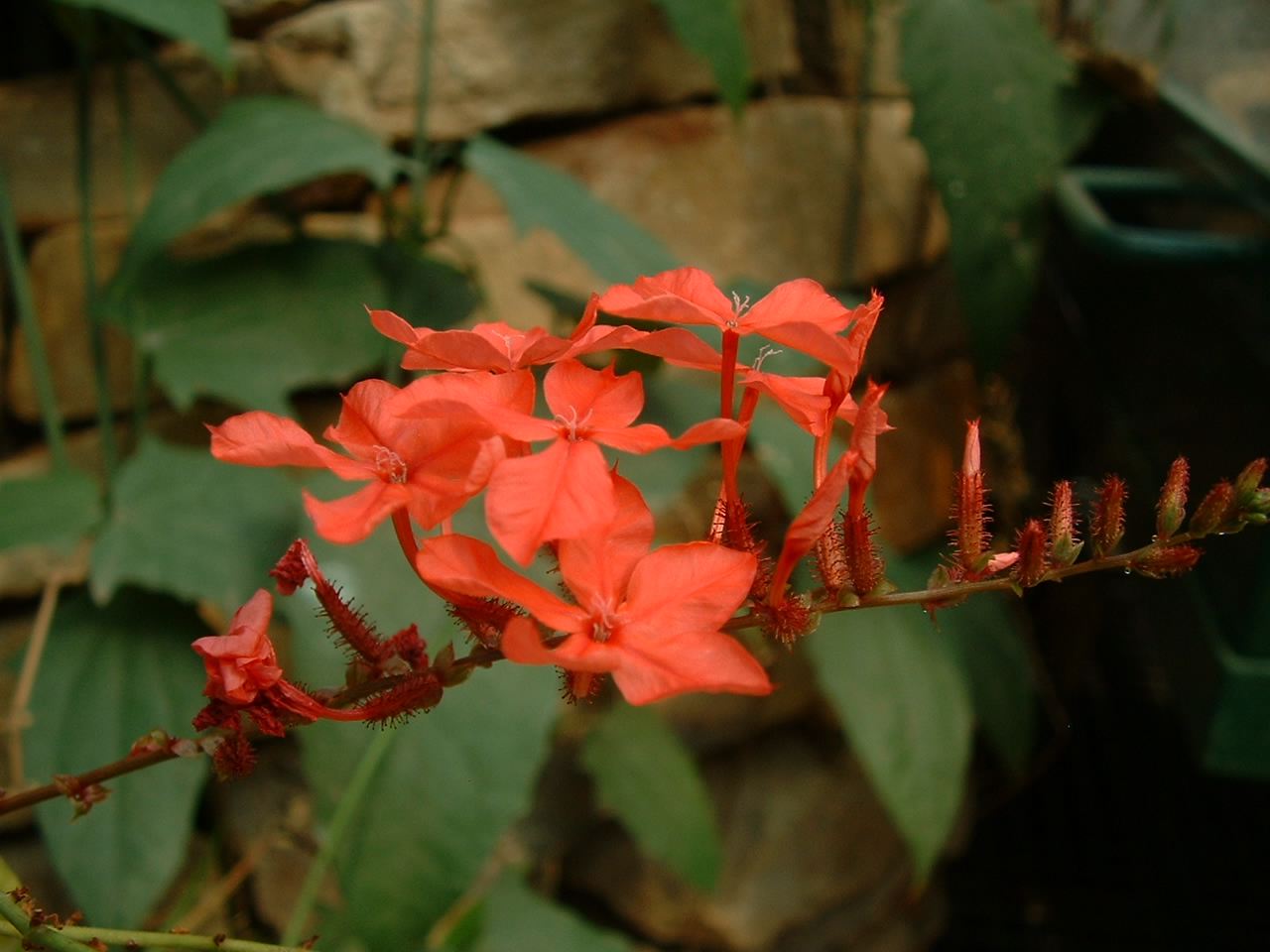
Chitrak (Plumbago)

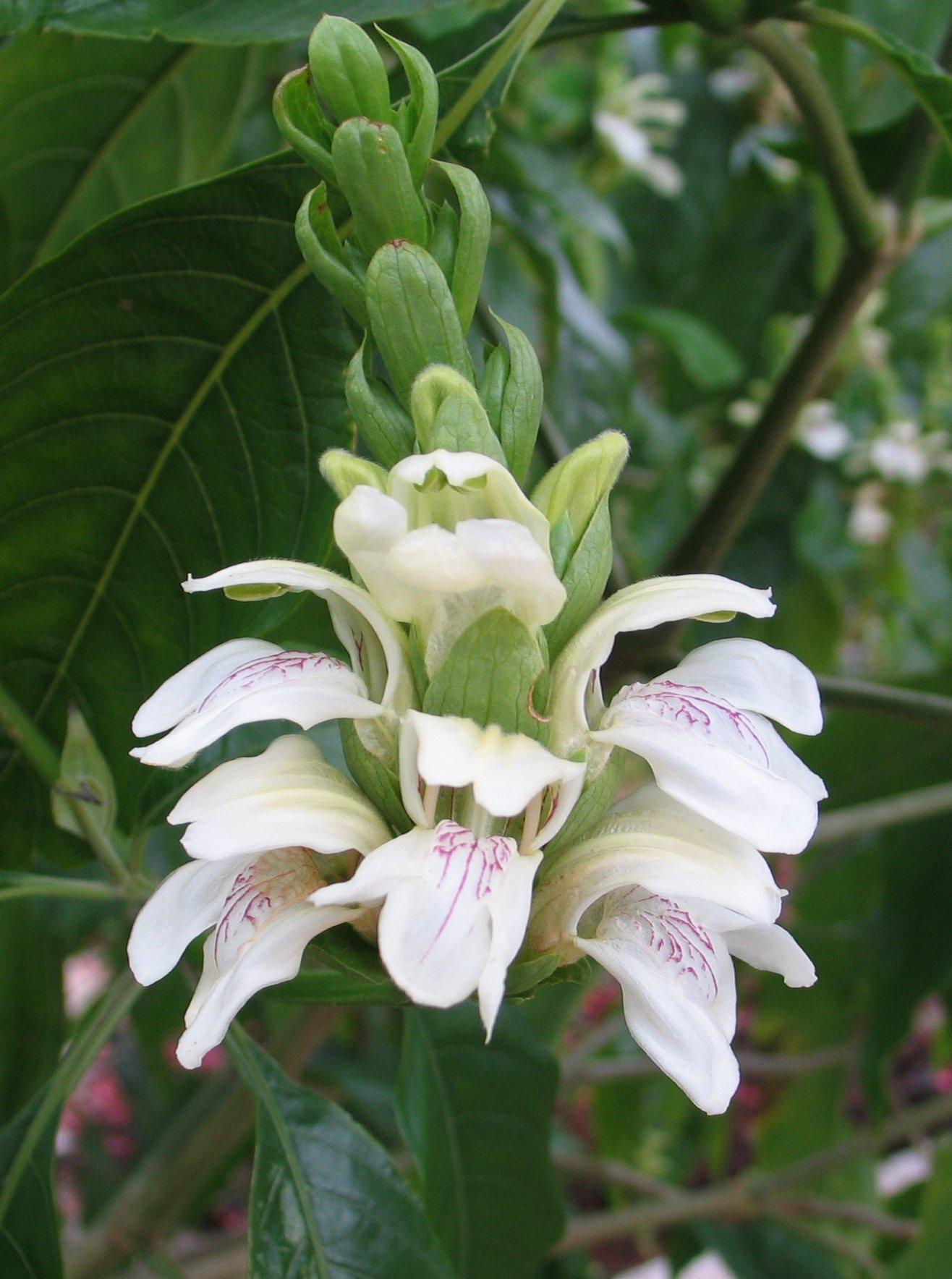
Baansa (Justicia adhatoda)

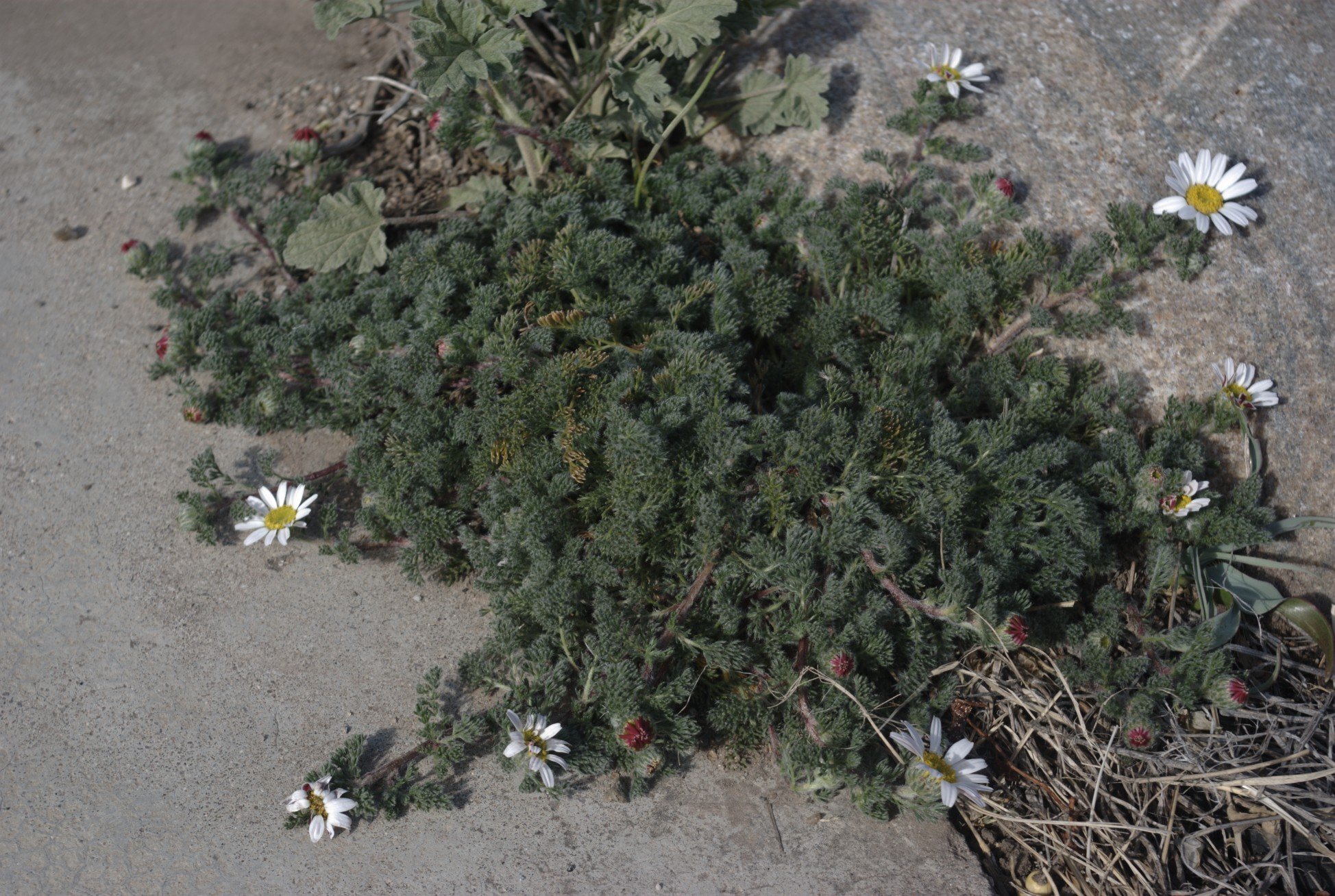
Akarkara (Anacyclus pyrethrum root)

== See also ==
- Blue Bird Lake Hisar
- Kanwari Indus Valley Mound at Kanwari
- Tosham rock inscription at Tosham
- Asigarh Fort at Hansi
- Firoz Shah Palace Complex
- Pranpir Badshah tomb at Hisar
- Mahabir Stadium
- Deer Park, Hisar
- Haryana Tourism
