= Deer Park, Hisar =

Deer Park
- Wildlife park
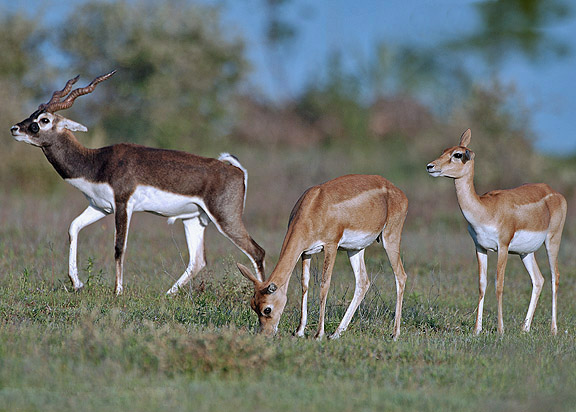
- Bluebuck male & female deer

- Location in Haryana, India Deer Park (India)
- Coordinates: 29°11′27″N 75°45′32″E
- Country: India
- State: Haryana
- District: Hisar
- Established: 1985
- Founder: Forests Department, Haryana
- Time zone: UTC+5:30 (IST)
- Website: haryanaforest.gov.in/DeerParkHisar.aspx

The Deer Park, Hisar, on Hisar-Dhansu in Hisar city of Haryana state in India has an area of 19 hectares (48 acres) including a 6-acre plot for producing fodder for the deer. Park as 4 species, blackbuck, chital spotted deer and 6 sambar. It also doubles up as the wildlife rescue clinic for the treatment injured wild animals and birds brought here by the people, which are released back in to the wild after the recovery.

Shatavar Vatika Herbal Park is 1 km northeast of the Deer Park.

== Background ==
=== Location ===
Deer Park Hisar is located on Hisar-Dhansu Road in Hisar. From the junction of Hisar-Barwala NH-52 and northern bypass at Hisar, 400 m north on NH-52 take the link road to Dhansu in northeast direction. The Deer Park, 1 km ahead/northeast of 'BPCL LPG Bottling Plant' on this link road, is 2.8 km from NH-52. Shatavar Vatika Herbal Park is 1.1 km ahead of Deer Park in northeast, 2.1 km from 'BPCL LPG Bottling Plant' and 3.9 km from NH-52. Dhansu is further 5 km and 4 km northeast of Deep Park and Shatavar Vatika Herbal Park respectively on this link road. Both, the Deer Park and the Shatavar Vatika Herbal Park, are run by the Forests Department of Government of Haryana.

Deer Park is 6.4 km from Hisar Airport and 4.9 km northeast of Blue Bird Lake.

=== History ===
The Deer Park was established by the Forests Department, Haryana of Government of Haryana in 1985 to advance conservation and to increase public awareness and understanding of the topic through education. It is the oldest among Zoos and deer parks in Haryana.

== Flora ==
The flora in the park includes ficus benghalensis (bayan or vat vriksh), ficus religiosa (peepal), indian rosewood (sheesham), vachellia nilotica (kikar), white mulberry (shahtoot), eucalyptus (safeda), and other thorny shrubs.

== Fauna ==
The deer park is surrounded by the largest forested area which is also home to the bengal fox, golden jackal, Indian crested porcupine, various species of snakes, black partridge, etc. The Asiatic lion was last seen here in 1960.

=== Deer park ===
The deer housed at the park for breeding include 20 Blackbuck, 16 Chital (spotted deer) and 6 sambar.

=== Great Indian Bustard breeding and conservation program ===
In 2021, Forests and Wildlife department of Haryana informed that Great Indian Bustard (hindi: सोन चिड़िया), which was previously found in abundance in the area of Siwani and Adampur, has largely disappeared from haryana. It is still found in Jaisalmer and Gwalior in India. Forests department will start a breeding program for the Great Indian Bustard at Hisar Deer park.

=== Butterfly and Bhanvra breeding and conservation program ===
From 2021, Wildlife department will also create a Butterfly and Xylocopa violacea (carpenter bee or काला भंवरा) breeding program. Plants, shrubs and flowers will be grown which support and sustain the life cycle of these insects.

== Visitor facilities ==
The park has a landscaped area with seats and fountain for picnic, an administrative block, wildlife treatment clinic, etc.

== Concern ==
There is demand to upgrade the visitors facilities such as the interpretation centre, toilets, shelter/shade, cafe, etc. Ecologists have demanded construction of wetland inside the park and planting of additional plants and conversion of the land into grassland with sprinkler system and by rejuvenating the organic manure and nutrient content of the soil inside the park.

== Gallery ==
Below are pictures of some of the species found at the deer park (pictures for representation only):

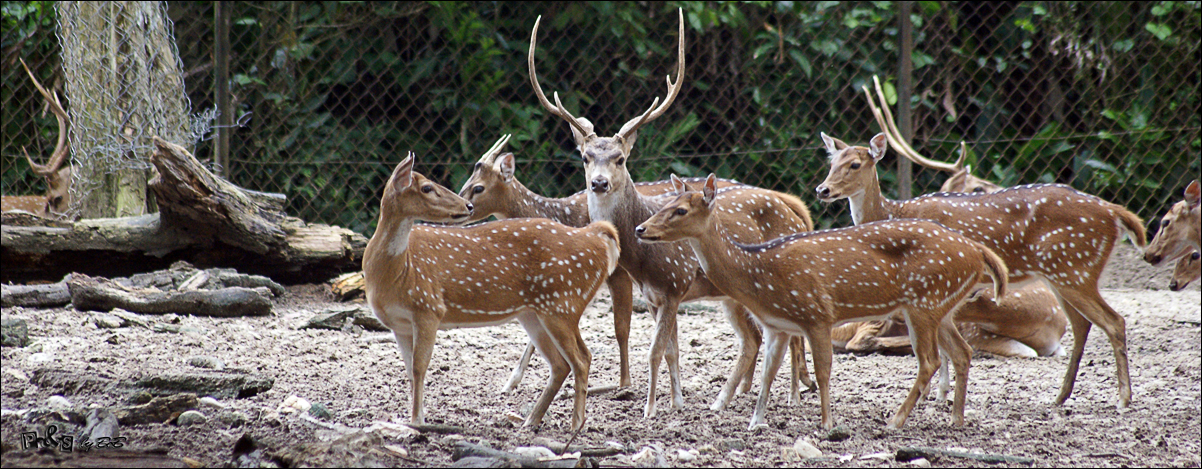
Chital Spotted Deer male (with long horn) and females (without horn)

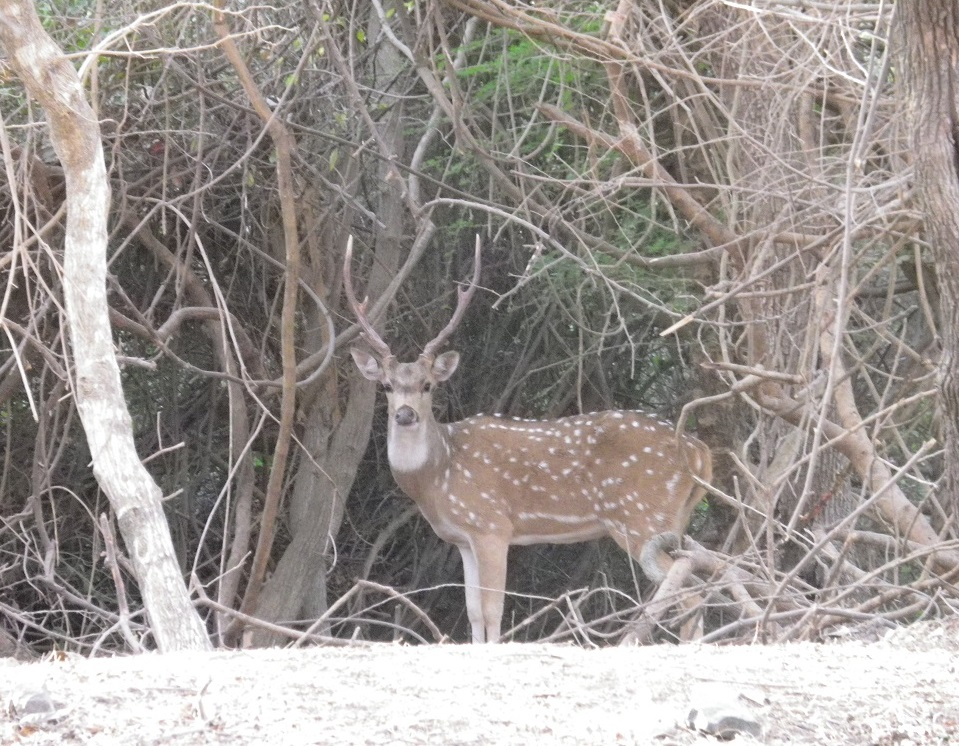
Chital Spotted Deer

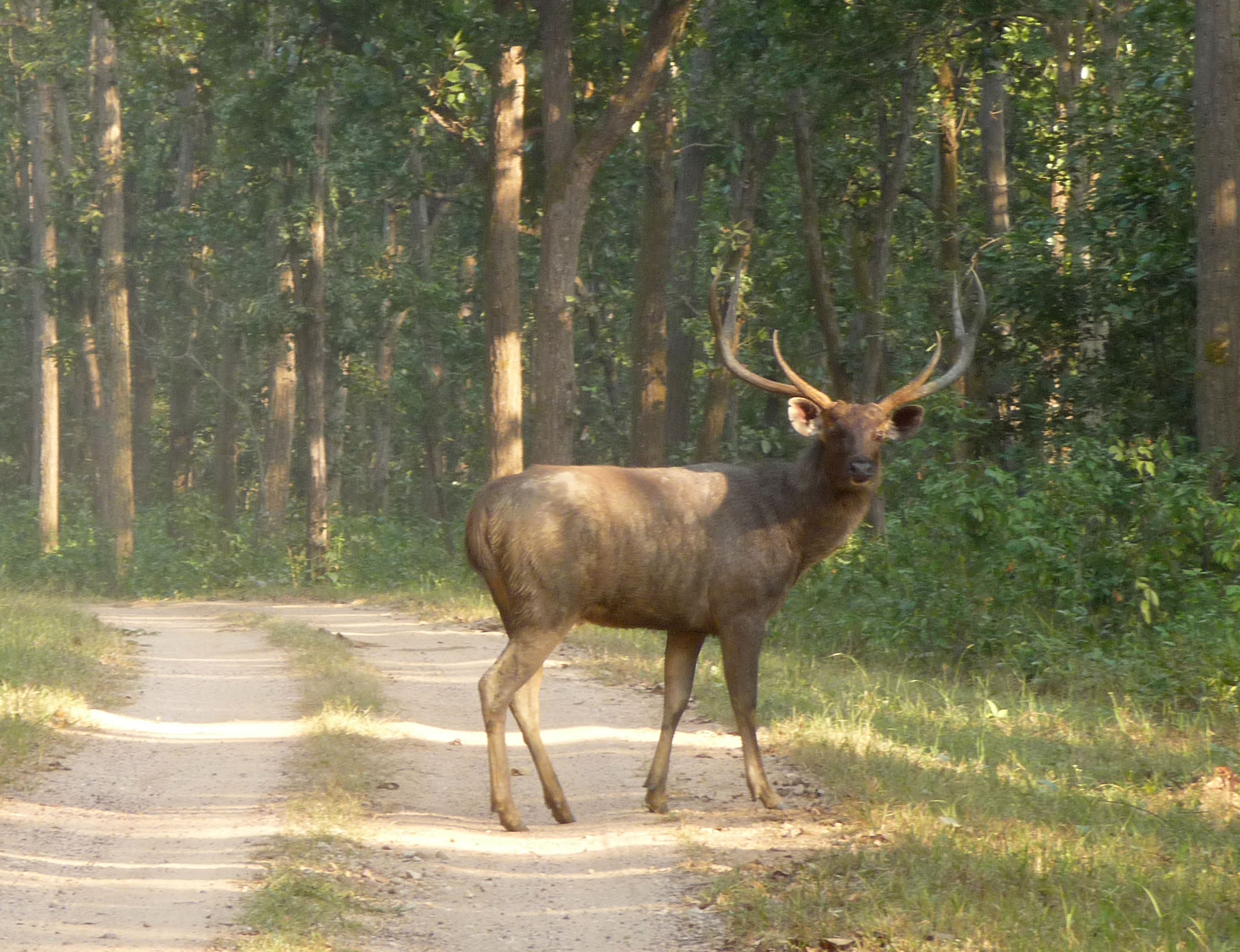
Sambar male with longer horn

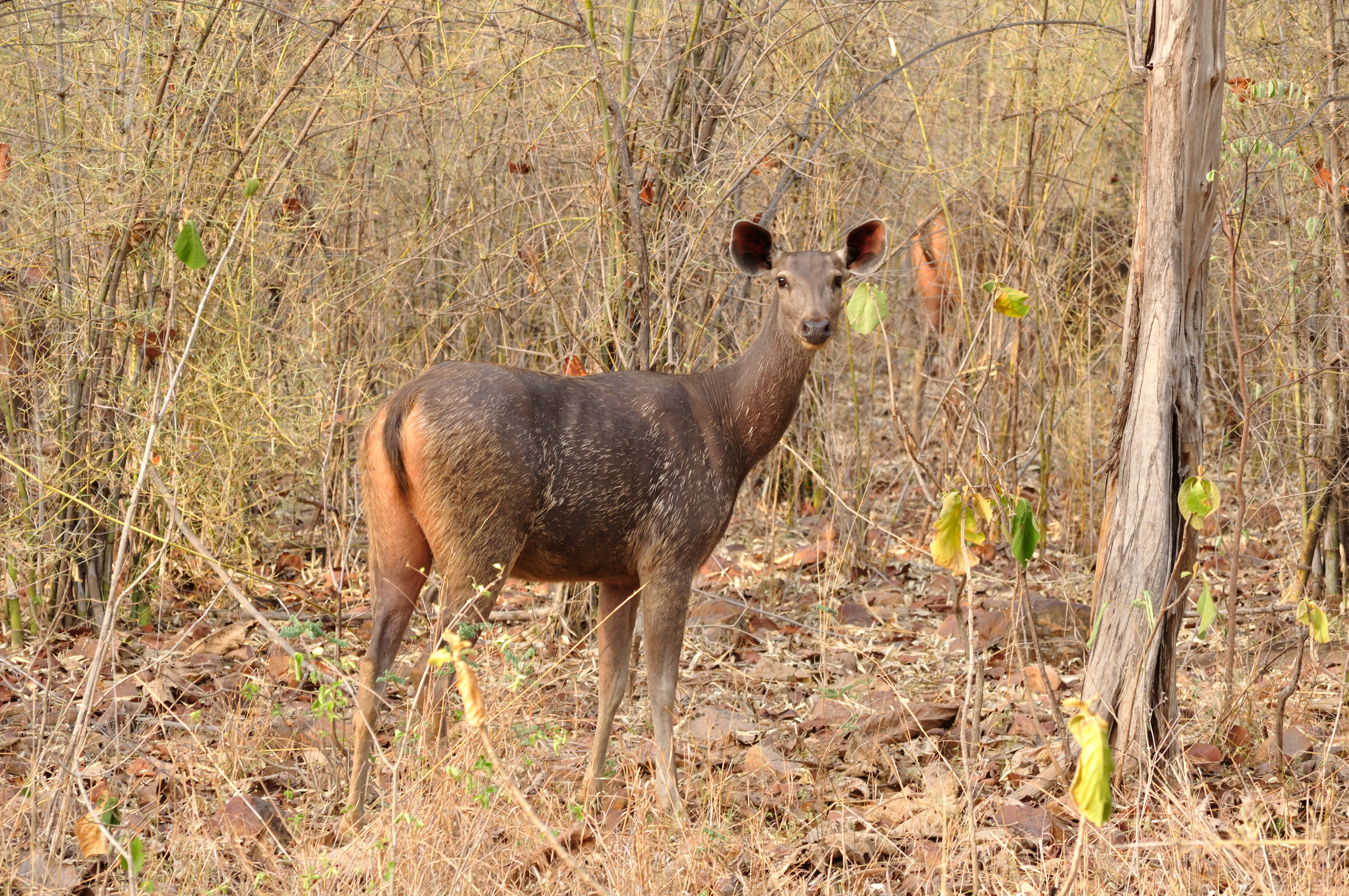
Sambar female with shorter horn

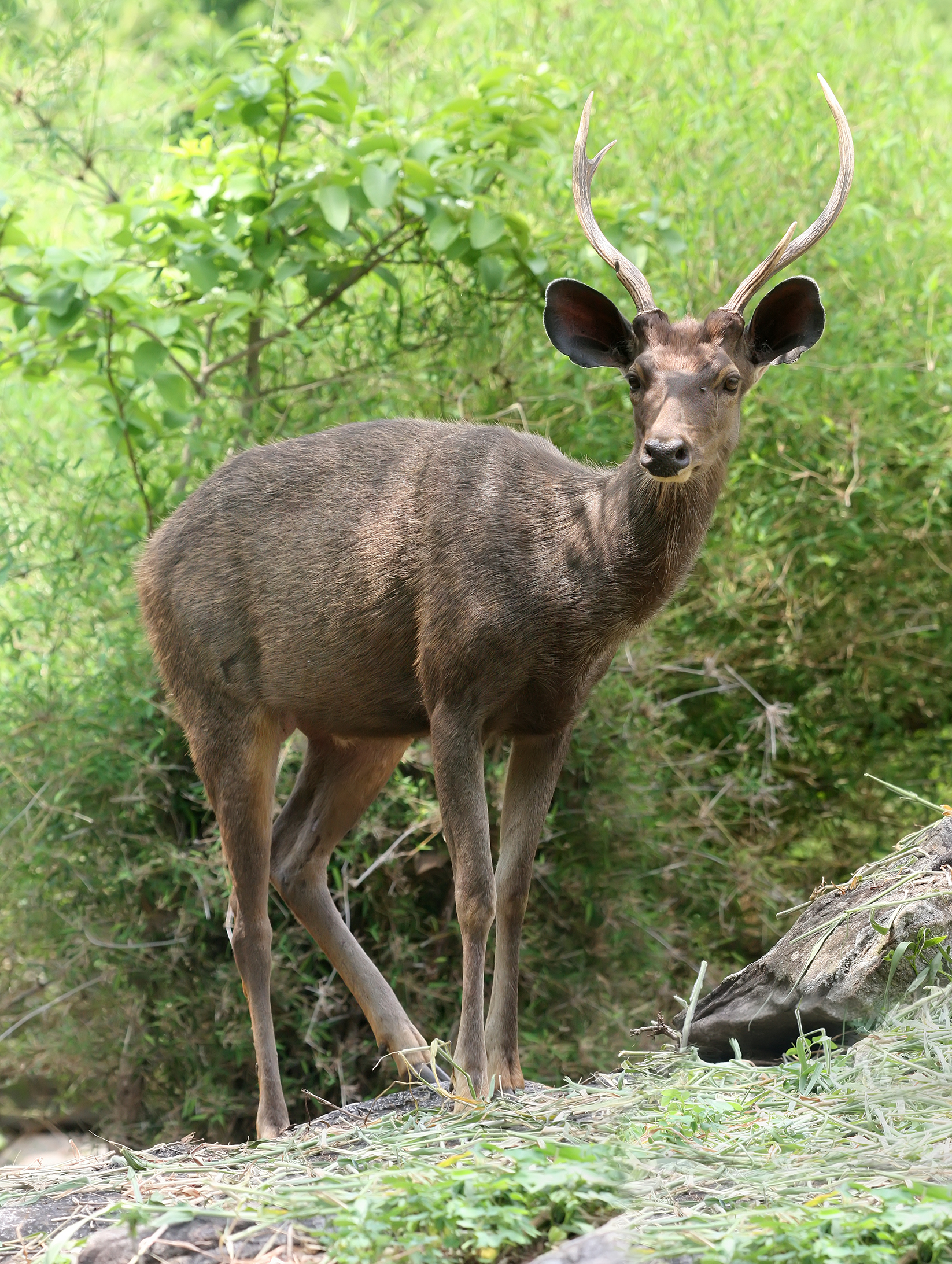
Sambar deer of unicolor

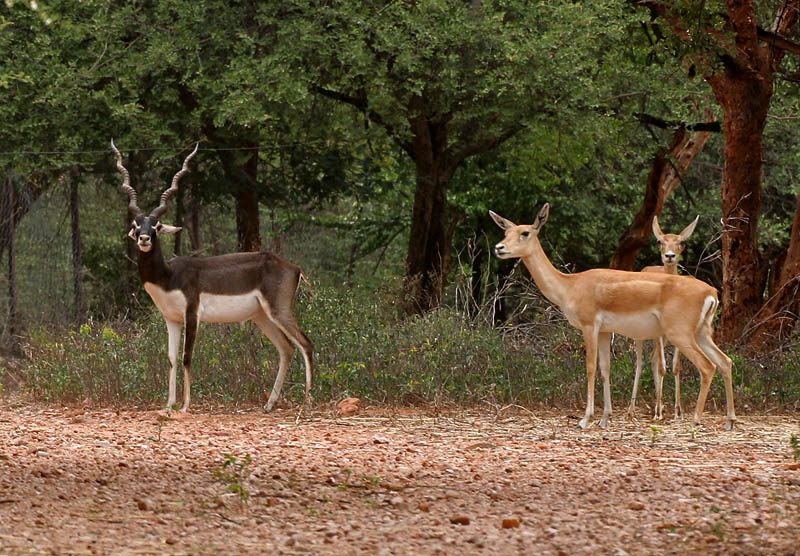
Blackbuck male (darker/black) and female (lighter/brown)

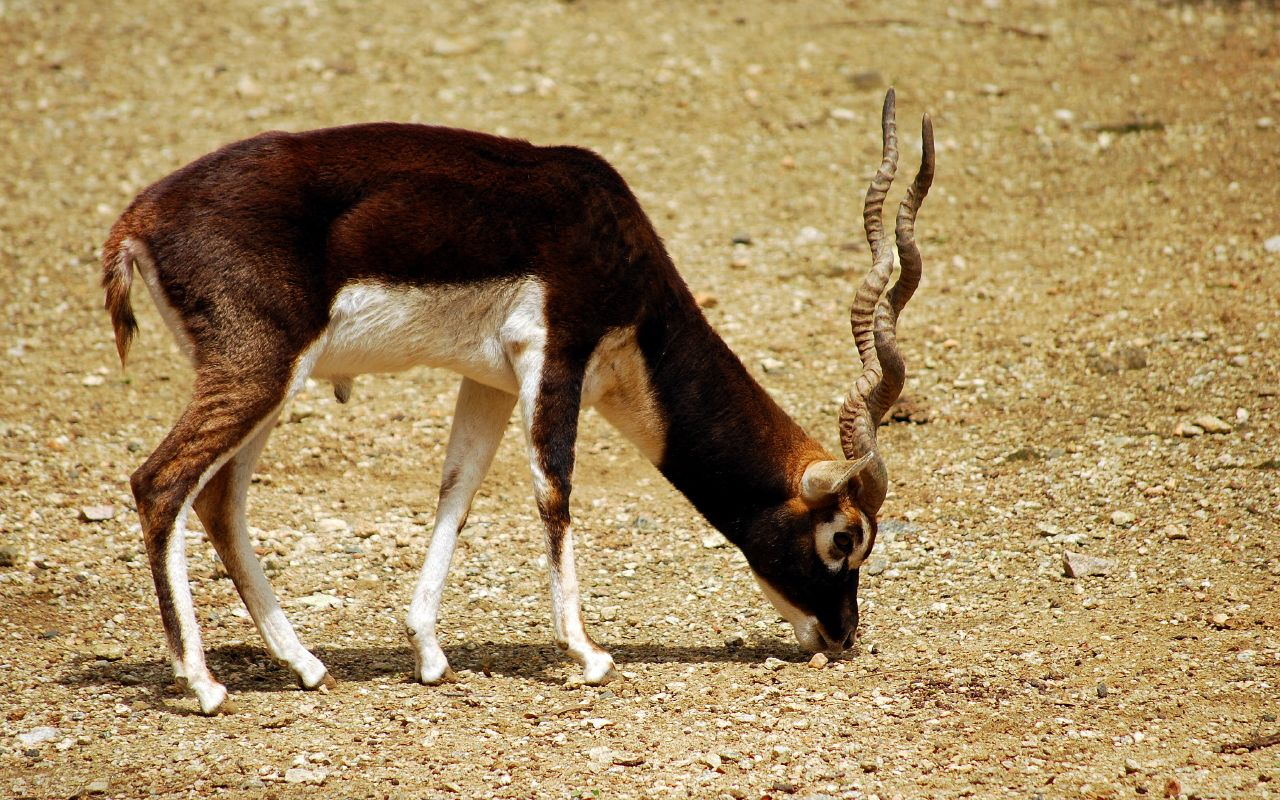
Blackbuck Antelope male

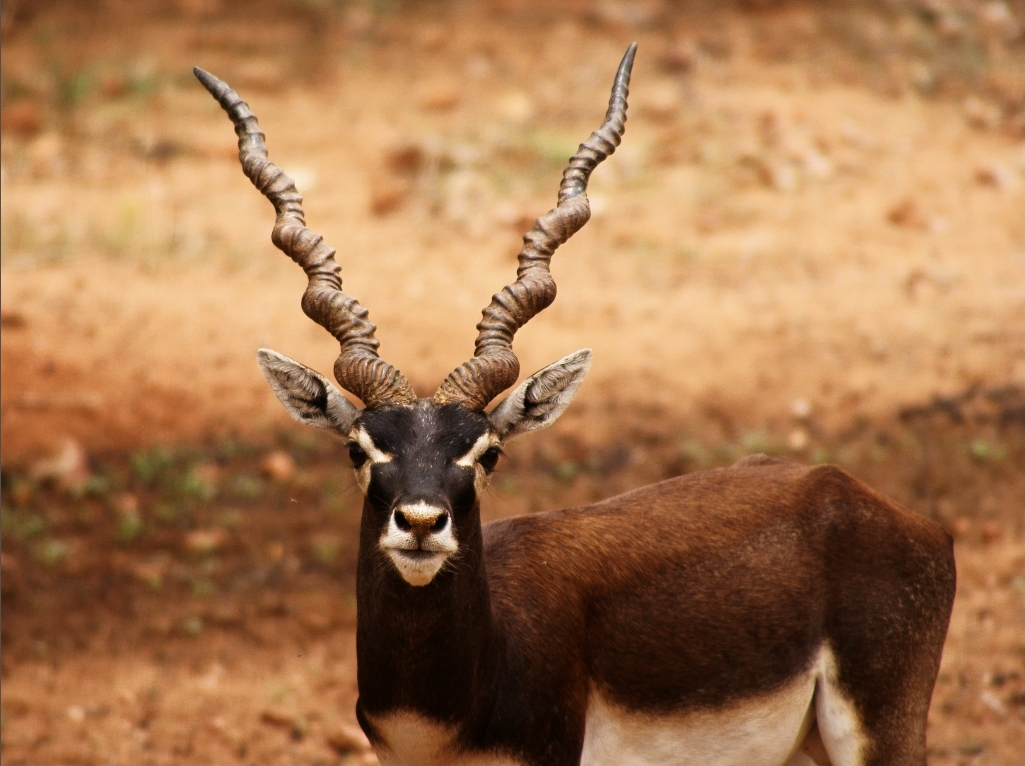
Blackbuck female

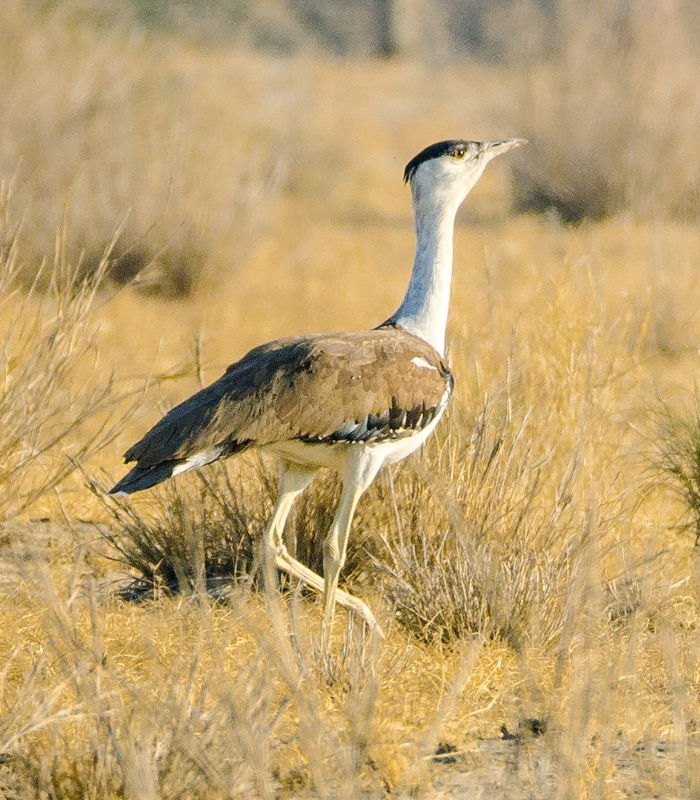
Great Indian Bustard

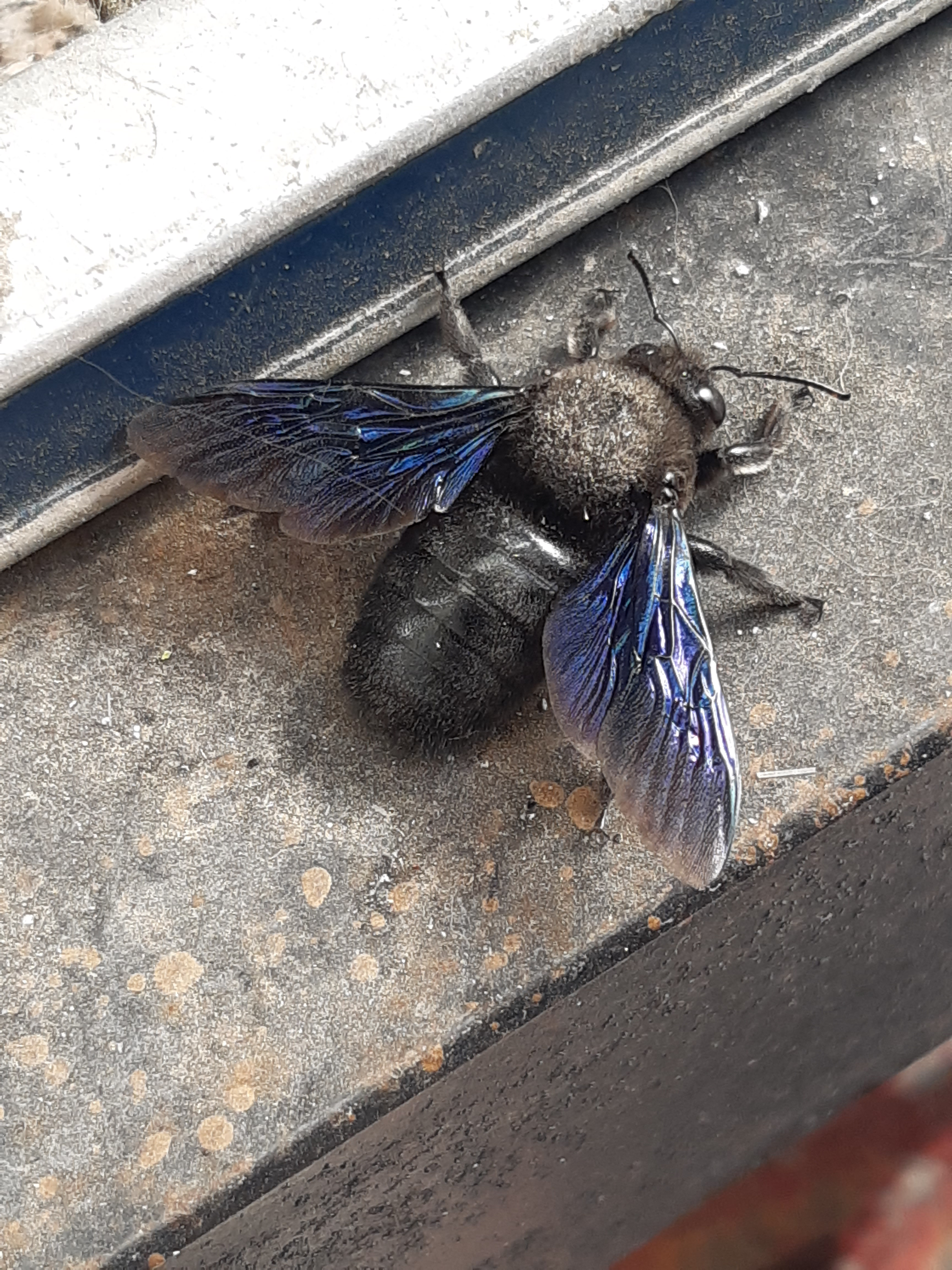
Carpenter bee or Kaala banvara

== Other nearby attractions ==
- Shatavar Vatika Herbal Park, Hisar is next to the Deer Park on Dhansu Road
- Blue Bird Lake Hisar
- Kanwari Indus Valley Mound at Kanwari
- Tosham rock inscription at Tosham
- Asigarh Fort at Hansi
- Firoz Shah Palace Complex
- Pranpir Badshah tomb at Hisar
- Mahabir Stadium
- Haryana Tourism

== See also ==
- Rohtak Zoo
- Mini Zoo & Black Buck Breeding Centre, Pipli
- List of zoos in India
- List of National Parks & Wildlife Sanctuaries of Haryana, India
- List of Monuments of National Importance in Haryana
- List of State Protected Monuments in Haryana
- List of Indus Valley Civilization sites in Haryana
- Haryana Tourism
