= Nahar Wildlife Sanctuary =

Protected area in Haryana, India

- IUCN category IV (habitat/species management area)
- Location within Haryana Location within India
- Interactive map of Nahar Wildlife Sanctuary
- Location: Rewari district, Haryana, India
- Coordinates: 28.409434°N 76.397007°E
- Area: 2.11
- Established: 1987
- Governing body: Haryana Forest Department
- Website: www.rewari.gov.in

Nahar Wildlife Sanctuary is situated in the Kosli Subdivision of Rewari district of Haryana, India. It is 36.9 km from Rewari. It is spread over an area of 211.35 hectares. It is 5 km away from Kosli on the Kosli-Mahendragarh road.

It is named Nahar because it comes under Nahar Village (Nahad village). Forests Department, Haryana of Government of Haryana officially notified this as Wildlife Sanctuary on 30 January 1987.

This is one of the last habitats for Blackbuck in particular, and for other endangered species in general.

== Location ==
Nahar Block of Rewari is a block consisting group of villages and also a village where surrounding villages have been included therein Nahar block. Nahar Block consists of 46 Gram Panchayats and 49 Villages and 123303 is its pin code number.

== See also ==
- List of National Parks & Wildlife Sanctuaries of Haryana, India
- Haryana Tourism
- List of Monuments of National Importance in Haryana
- List of State Protected Monuments in Haryana
- List of Indus Valley Civilization sites in Haryana, Punjab, Rajasthan, Gujarat, India & Pakistan
