= Mini Zoo & Black Buck Breeding Centre, Pipli =

Mini Zoo, Pipli
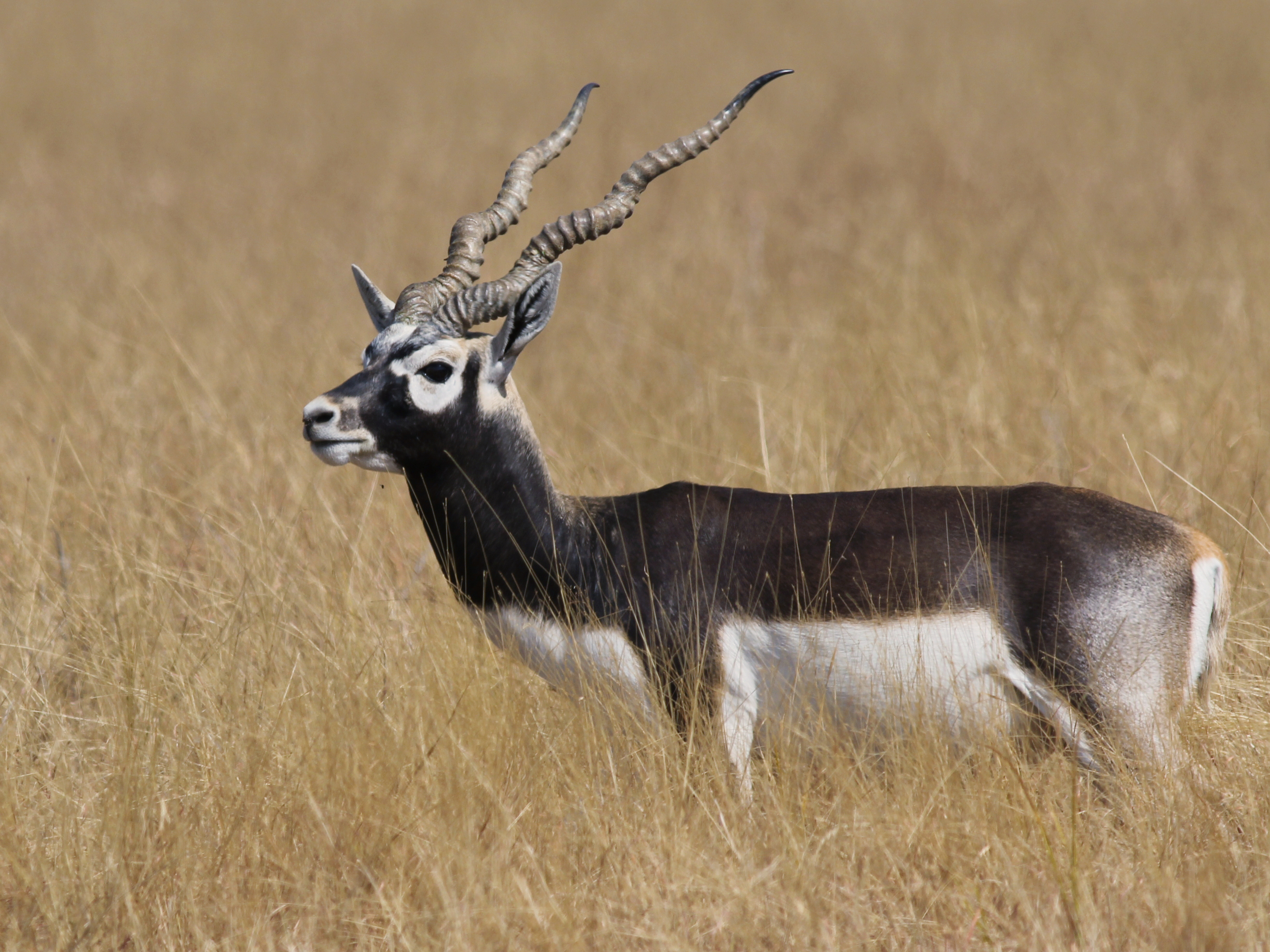

- Location within Haryana Location within India
- Coordinates: 29°59′08″N 76°53′37″E
- Country: India
- State: Haryana
- District: Kurukshetra district
- Established: 1982

Government
  - Type: Government of Haryana
  - Body: Forests Department, Haryana

Languages
  - Official: Hindi
- Time zone: UTC+5:30 (IST)
- Website: www.haryanaforest.gov.in

The Mini Zoo is located on Grand Trunk Road near Pipli bus stand in Kurukshetra, Haryana, India.

== Description ==
Spread over 27 acres of land along the National Highway-1 in Kurukshetra, Pipli zoo is one of the three maintained zoos of the state wildlife department. The other two are in Rohtak and Bhiwani. The zoo has the following animals:

- Asiatic lion
- Blackbuck
- Hanuman langur
- Chital (spotted deer)
- Indian leopard
- Hyena
- Jackal
- Peafowl
- Red jungle fowl
- Hippopotamus
- Gharial
- Mugger
- Sambar

== Incidents related to zoos in Haryana ==
- Deer Park, Hisar, founded in 1970–71, is oldest among zoos and deer parks in Haryana
- Haryana is now left with 5 tigers in captivity: 2 each in Mini Zoo, Bhiwani and Rohtak Zoo and 1 in Pipali Zoo
- In 2003, a baby baboon was born in Pipali Zoo
- In 2009, tiger Apaya of Bhiwani zoo attacked and killed another tigress.
- In 2011, tiger Apaya of Bhiwani zoo entered the enclosure of another tigress Rani and attacked her. Rani died and was buried on the zoo premises.
- In 2011 another tiger Brondis had killed a caretaker in Bhiwani zoo.
- In 2014, 43 private school kids who were visiting Bhiwnai zoo were attacked by the bees.

== Riverfont ==
Pipli Sarasvati Riverfont is being developed are a riverfront. In 2021, Haryana Sarasvati Heritage Development Board initiated projects to develop 5 river fronts under the under Sarasvatio Revival Project on the rejuvenated Sarasvati river at Pipli, Pehowa, Bilaspur, Dosarka (on Panchkula-Yamunanagar NH-344 near Sirsgarh) and the Theh Polar (near Sarasvati-Sindhu Civilisation archaeological site on Kaithal-Guhla SH-11). Pipli riverfront will be on the pattern Sabarmati Riverfront.

It is one of the important tirtha in the 48 kos parikrama of Kurukshetra.

== Gallery ==
Representative album of types of animals and birds found in this zoo.

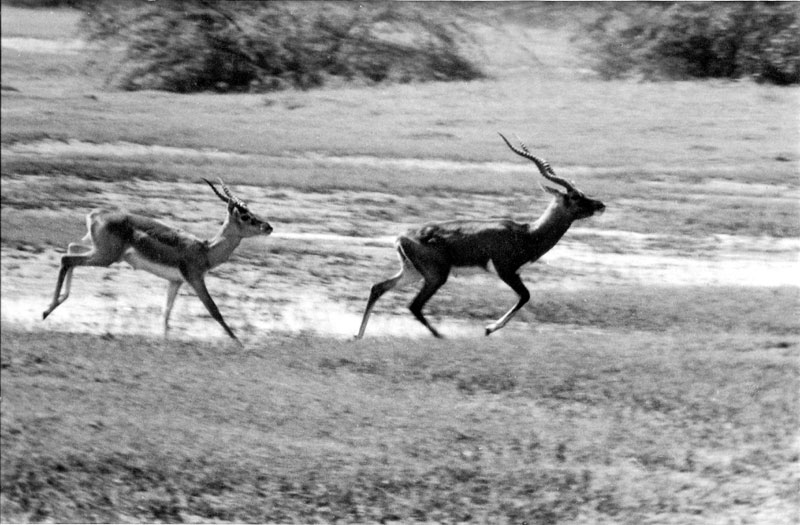
Blackbuck fleeing

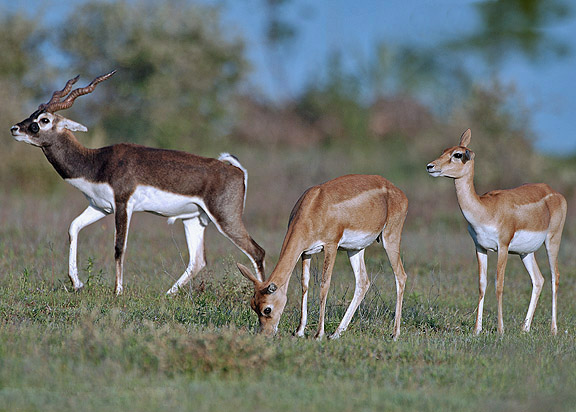
Male and female blackbucks

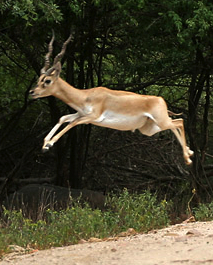
Antelope jumping

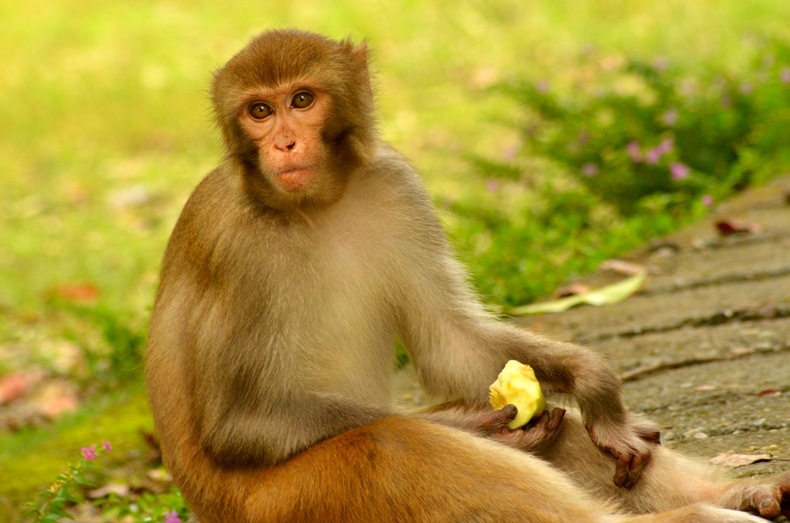
Bandar (monkey)

== See also ==
- 48 kos parikrama of Kurukshetra
- Gita Mahotsav
- Lohgarh (Bilaspur)
- List of protected areas of Haryana
- Parikrama
- Sadaura
