= Jatayu Conservation Breeding Centre, Pinjore =

Jatayu Conservation and Breeding Centre
- Critically Endangered Bird Breeding Centre
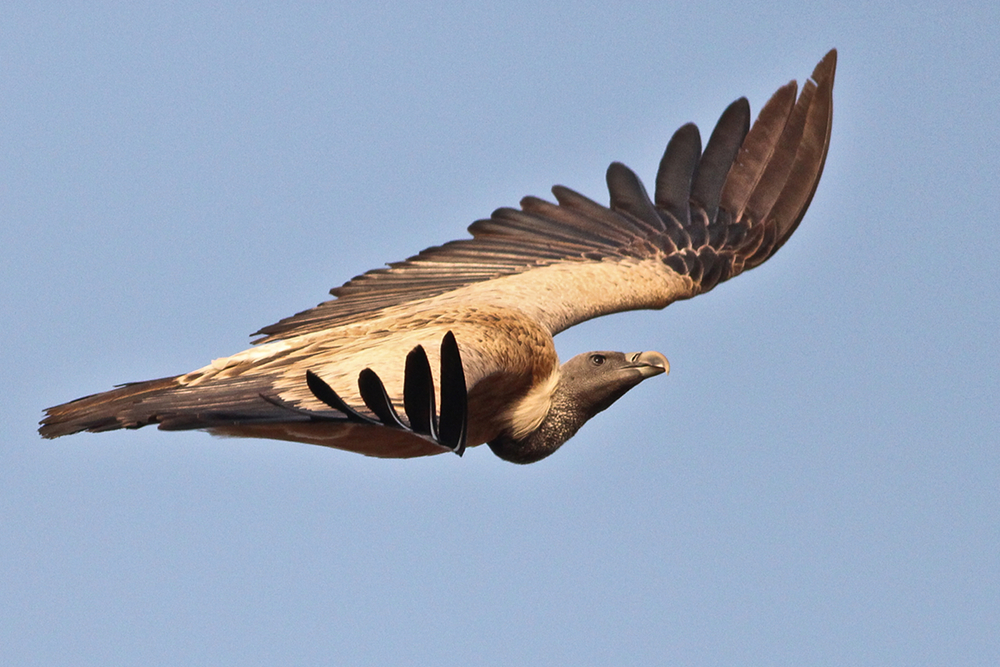
- Indian vulture in flight

- Location in Haryana, India Jatayu Conservation and Breeding Centre (India)
- Coordinates: 30°46′7″N 76°57′19″E
- Country: India
- State: Haryana
- District: Panchkula
- Established: 2001
- Founder: Former Chief Minister of Haryana Om Prakash Chautala
- Named for: Jatayu

Government
  - Type: Government of Haryana
  - Body: Forests Department, Haryana
- Time zone: UTC+5:30 (IST)
- Website: haryanaforest.gov.in

The Jatayu and Sparrow Conservation Breeding Centre (JCBC) is the world's largest facility for the breeding and conservation of Indian vultures and the house sparrow (Passer domesticus). It is located within the Bir Shikargah Wildlife Sanctuary in the town of Pinjore in the State of Haryana, India. It is run by the Haryana Forests Department and Bombay Natural History Society with the help of British nature conservation charity Royal Society for the Protection of Birds. It is 8 kilometres (5.0 mi) from Pinjore and covers 5 acres (2.0 ha).

Named after the mythical vulture Jatayu from the Hindu epic Ramayana, it was established in 2001 as Asia's first vulture breeding facility and focuses on the conservation of critically endangered species of vultures on the IUCN Red List. The centre's research confirmed that the use of the anti-inflammatory drug diclofenac in cattle was a critical factor in the decline of vulture populations. The Government of India banned the veterinary use of the drug in 2007–2008 as a result of research done at the centre.

Although the house sparrow is of least concern globally, its numbers in India have been declining, especially in Punjab and Haryana. JCBC is conducting research on the causes of decline to formulate plans to reverse it.

== History ==
=== Vultures ===
Fossil records of vultures have been found going as far back as 20 million years ago, from which the Gyps species evolved. This genus represents the majority of the vultures in the Indian subcontinent. They nest on high cliff faces in social groups of typically 20, 30, or even up to 100 vultures, with nests made from wool, skin, dung and refuse. Vultures are scavengers with a high tolerance for the pathogens found in their primary meal of rotting animal carcasses.

Out of the 40 million vultures in India in 1993, 99.9% of slender-billed vultures and 97% white-backed vultures had disappeared from their primary habitat by 2007. This was due to the use of the anti-inflammatory drug diclofenac to treat cattle. The drug is retained in cattle for days. When a vulture feeds on a treated animal that has died, the drug then poisons the vulture. Reduction of vulture numbers has led to an increase in the availability of carrion to other species, resulting in an estimated 7 million more feral dogs who inflicted 40 million more dog bites between 1993 and 2016, causing an estimated 48,000 excess human deaths by rabies and US$34 billion in loss to the economy of India.

The ban on the use of diclofenac in 2007–2008, combined with the success of vulture breeding of the three critically endangered species at JCBC, led to the formation of Saving Asia's Vultures from Extinction (SAVE) in 2011 as a consortium of 14 partner organizations and 14 Indian government agencies, with a goal of restoring at least 40% (16 million) of the vanished white backed, long-billed and slender-billed vultures of South Asia. They plan to achieve this by setting up a total of eight vulture breeding centers (JCBC and seven more) across India, each with a resident vulture population of at least 25 vultures of the three species, allowing the release into the wild of 600 of these vultures across 3,000,000 square km.

=== Sparrow Rescue and Research Centre ===
In January 2019, the government of Haryana approved INR5,300,000 to establish, with the help of the Bombay Natural History Society, two Sparrow Rescue and Research Centres, each with 50 pairs of birds collected from various parts of Haryana. These centres were to be located at two sites: Bhondsi Nature Camp in the Aravalli mountain range in south Haryana and Jatayu Conservation and Breeding Centre in the Shivalik mountain range in north Haryana. Though the International Union for Conservation of Nature has classified the sparrow as a species of least concern globally, its numbers have been declining regionally, especially in Punjab and Haryana. Centres will research the causes of decline and formulate action plans to reverse the trend. Centres were expected to become operational in summer 2019.

In 2021, to provide bird habitats in rapidly urbanising areas, the Haryana Wildlife Department distributed 6000 bird nest boxes, 1000 each in six districts of South Haryana. The bird houses were given to panchayats, government offices, non-profit organization, and others. To cater to birds of small and medium sizes, the boxes were of two types: 9 × 9 inch and 1 × 1 ft. Wildlife activists, however, demanded that the government take more conservation actions than just distributing bird boxes.

=== Related vulture breeding centres ===
In 2014, the government of India announced a plan to bring the number of vulture breeding centres to eight to replicate the successful model of JCBC, relocating some vultures from JCBC and all vultures from 19 zoos in India:

1. Rani Vulture Breeding Centre inside Brahmaputra Valley semi-evergreen forests at Rani in the Kamrup district of Assam; it was established in 2008 and housed 90 vultures as of December 2018.
2. Rajabhatkhawa Vulture Breeding Centre at Buxa National Park, West Bengal; it housed 120 vultures as of December 2018 and received a grant of INR2.5 crore.
3. Hydrabad Vulture Breeding Center at Nehru Zoological Park, Hyderabad
4. Kerwa Vulture Breeding Center at Van Vihar National Park, Bhopal.
5. Junagadh Vulture Breeding Center at Sakkarbaug Zoological Garden, Junagadh
6. Ranchi Vulture Breeding Center at Crocodile Breeding Centre, Muta, Ranchi
7. Bhubaneswar Vulture Breeding Center at Nandankanan Zoological Park, Bhubaneswar

== Vulture conservation at JCBC ==
=== JCBC research on vultures and diclofenac ===
The JCBC undertook research on vultures, their habitat, and the causes of their decline, and uses the resulting data for vulture advocacy. The centre's research confirmed the discovery that the use of anti-inflammatory drug diclofenac in cattle was a critical factor in the decline of vulture populations. The Government of India banned the veterinary use of the drug in 2007–2008 as a result of research done at the centre; since then the use of diclofenac has diminished significantly, but it still remains a threat.

"40 million vultures died in [the] last 20 years ... India should also prioritize vulture conservation as these birds are rarer than tigers. As many as 70 vultures consume a cow carcass in just half an hour which otherwise can rot, infecting domestic animals, pollut[ing] water and increas[ing] the number of stray dogs. So, if these valuable species [go] extinct, we will be held guilty for their disappearance.”

— Jemima Parry-Jones, Director, International Centre for Birds of Prey, United Kingdom

=== Species at JCBC ===
JCBC houses the following four species, three critically endangered and one threatened, for breeding and conservation:

- Critically endangered species
  - Indian vulture, scientific name Gyps indicus, formerly known as the long-billed vulture.
  - Slender-billed vulture, scientific name Gyps tenuirostris, formerly classified under the long-billed vulture; 97% have been wiped out by diclofenac.
  - White-rumped vulture, scientific name Gyps bengalensis, formerly known as the oriental white-backed vulture; 99.9% have been wiped out by diclofenac.
- Threatened species
  - Himalayan vulture, scientific name Gyps himalayensis.

=== Conservation and breeding activities ===
JCBC is world's largest facility in terms of numbers of vultures, hosting an ever increasing 250 vultures in 2017 and growing annually at a rate of more than 17% per year.

In 2007, aviculture at JCBC was started in the on-site vulture hatchery. In 2016, the release in the wild program commenced for the first time in Asia. In 2017, Asia's first satellite tracking of the released vultures started at JCBC.

Starting in 2007, JCBC has successfully accelerated the breeding rate by doubling of the number of these otherwise slow to breed vulture species through the use of artificial incubation. As a result of the successful breeding program, the number of vultures at JCBC rose by 17% in one year, from 214 vultures in 2016 to 250 vultures in 2017. JCBC has successfully released captured and rehabilitated as well as captive-bred vultures back into the wild after proper acclimatization and preparation. There is a ten-year plan to release 100 vultures from 2016 to 2026.

In 2016, out of 214 vultures at JCBC, 76 were Indian vultures, 29 were slender-billed vultures, 107 were white-rumped vultures and two were Himalayan vultures (these two were released that year). In 2016, Asia's first ever vulture release program began on World Environment Day with the release of two Himalayan vultures, which were released with wing tags and brightly colored ring tags to enable field biologists to identify individual birds without recapture but did not have satellite-based tracking devices. These two vultures were brought in during 2005 to lay eggs for breeding and were released into the wild in 2016, but could not be tracked due to the lack of satellite tracker. These releases, according to principal scientist Vibhu Prakash, "gave us confidence to carry out future releases.” In 2016, 15 vultures, 10 slender-billed and 5 white-rumped, were sent from JCBC to the Kerwa Vulture Breeding Center, located inside the Van Vihar National Park in Bhopal.

In 2017, out of 250 vultures, 90 were caught for breeding and 160 have been bred in captivity in the natural setting of the Bir Shikargah Wildlife Sanctuary, which facilitates rehabilitation in a phased manner under wild-like conditions for eventual release. JCBC started to use a satellite tracking system in 2017. Vultures are acclimatized with dummy units before release. Each satellite tracking unit, attached under the wings with lightweight, sturdy teflon string, relays the vulture's latitude and longitude four times a day during the three-year life span of the tracking unit. If the reported location remains unchanging for a day, a ground team is sent to locate and investigate the bird. In 2017, eight vultures were released with satellite trackers. These included a white-rumped vulture and two other vultures brought from the wild at the beginning of the program in 2007 for breeding purposes.

In 2018, JCBC received a grant of INR3.5 crore for the conservation of vultures from the Ministry of Environment, Forest and Climate Change.

Eight endangered white-rumped vultures were released into the wild in October 2020 and have since been reported to be adapting to their new habitat.

== Gallery ==
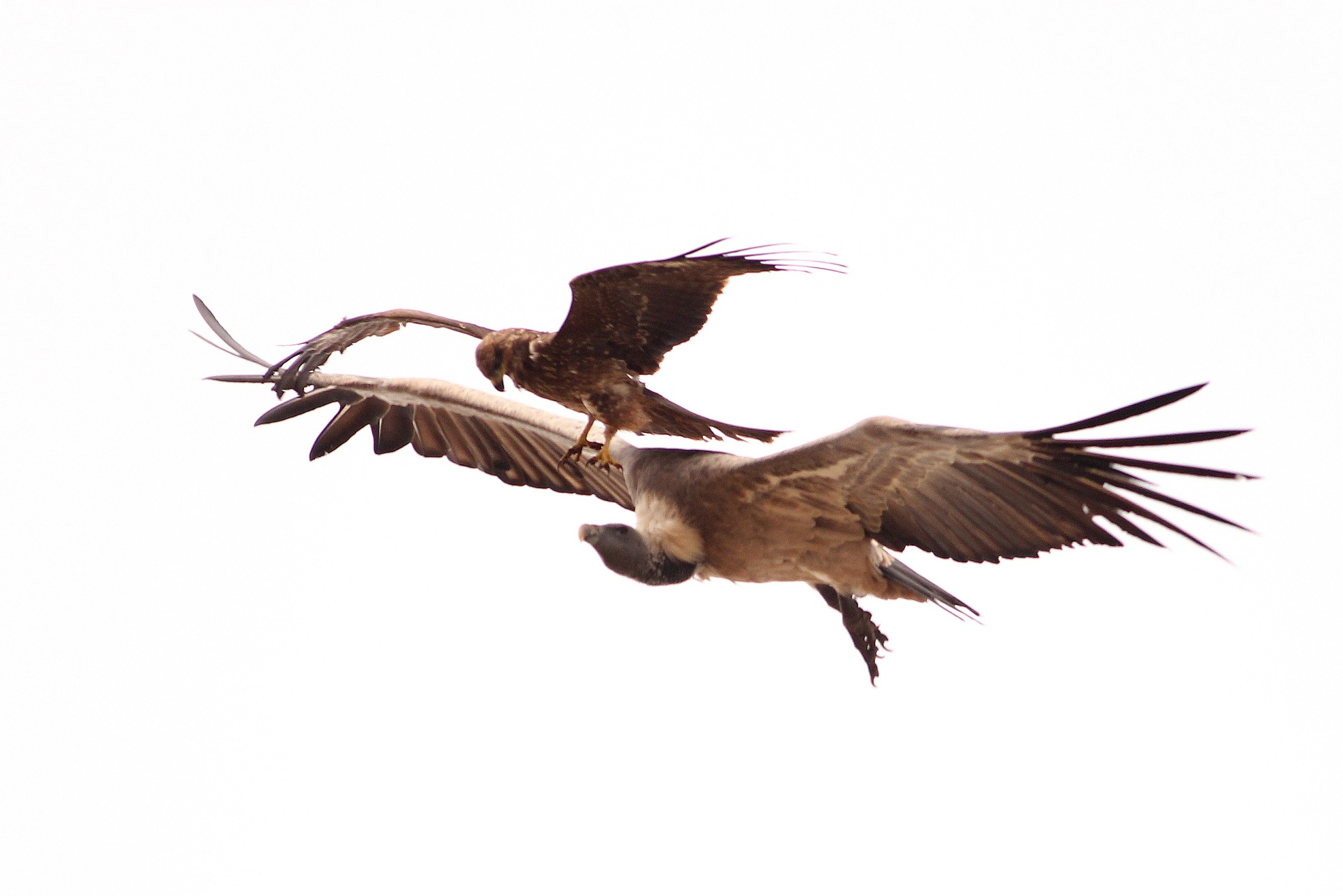
Indian vulture chased by Black Kite

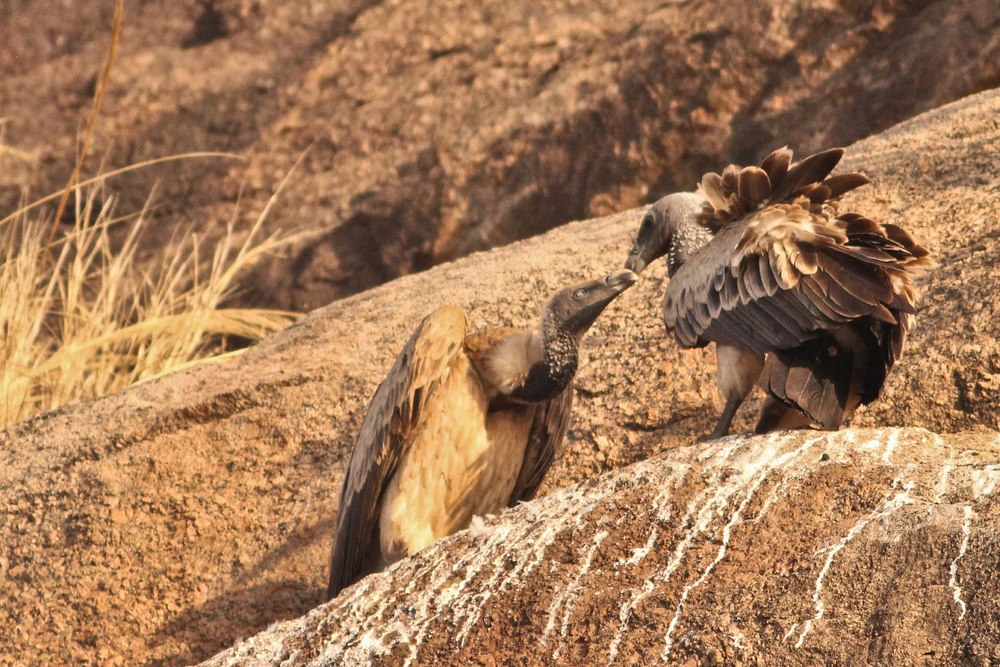
Courtship between two Indian vultures
