= Haryana Land Reclamation and Development Corporation =

- Type: Haryana Government Undertaking
- Founded: 27 March 1974
- Headquarters: Bays 1-2, Sector-4,, Panchkula, India
- Number of locations: 3 Regional offices (Hisar, Karnal and Kaithal) and
- Area served: Haryana, India

Haryana Land Reclamation and Development Corporation, headquartered in Panchkula, is an entity of the Government of Haryana established to reclaim alkaline land, manage government owned farms, Bharat Petroleum gas agencies and petrol pumps as well as to sell supplies to farmers of the state. It has 3 Regional offices (Hisar, Karnal and Kaithal) and five managerial offices (Naraingarh, Rewari, Bhiwani, Hanumangarh and Faridabad). Its largest 1119 acres farm is based at Hisar.

== History ==
Haryana Land Reclamation and Development Corporation Limited was incorporated on 27 March 1974 with the main objective of implementing the Land Reclamation Act and was tasked with reclamation of alkaline lands in the Haryana, management of agriculture farms, operation of Bharat gas agencies and petrol pumps, as well as the sale of gypsum (17 locations and 124 dealers), fertilizers, weedicides, pesticides and other agriculture inputs to the farmers of Haryana state.

== Capabilities ==
It manages a Shopping Complex at Naraingarh in Ambala, two petrol pumps at Naraingrah and Panipat, 4 gas agencies (Hisar, Faridabad and Naraingarh), and 11 farms totalling 1842 acres for producing the certified seeds to supply to the farmers of the state.

== See also ==
- Central Sheep Breeding Farm, Hisar
- Central Institute for Research on Buffaloes (CIRB), Hisar
- Government Livestock Farm, Hisar
- National Research Centre on Equines, Hisar
