= Dhansu =

Dhansu, Hisar
- Village
- Location in Haryana, India Dhansu, Hisar (India)
- Coordinates: 29°11′27″N 75°45′32″E
- Country: India
- State: Haryana
- District: Hisar

Government
  - Type: Local governance
  - Body: Panchayat : Manohar Lal Bhakhar

Population (2011)
  - Total: 6,500

Desi & Haryanvi language
  - Official: Hindi
- Time zone: UTC+5:30 (IST)
- PIN: 125005
- Telephone code: +91-(01662)
- ISO 3166 code: IN-HR
- Vehicle registration: HR-20
- Sex ratio: ♂/♀
- Website: haryana.gov.in

Dhansu is a village in Hisar, Haryana, India, in Hisar Division. Its Pin code is 125005 and its postal head office is at Vidut Nagar.

== Location ==
The village is located next to Deer Park, Hisar and Hisar Airport. It is well connected by road to Hisar, which is 10 km distant. Barwala, Hansi, and Fatehabad are other nearby cities. Distance to nearby villages is as follows: Talwandi Rana (4 km), Sulkhani (7 km), Bahbalpur (10 km), Juglan (6 km), Bugana (9 km), Mirzapur 4 km, Dhiktana 6.5 km.

== Facilities ==
Dhansu has a government sr. sec.school (co-edu), High school for girls, Pry. health center, Vet. hospital, railway station, gramin bank, post office, water works and a play ground stadium. It has a College of Education that awards Bachelor of degrees and some private schools up to sec. education. A Gausala is also in this village, where appx. 300 cows and caugh are supported, i.e. governed by villagers and volunteers and donors. Dhansu has a Common Service Center authorized by e-Governance Haryana.

== Demographics ==
The castes in the village are Brahamans, Rajputs, Baniyas, Jaat (Gada), Kumhar, Khati, Nai, Bishnoi, Luhar, Chamar, Dhanak and some others. Main occupation of people is agriculture and domestic/government/private jobs and daily labour.
