= Haryana Forest Department =

Ministry and department of the Government of Haryana in India

Government of Haryana Forests Department, Haryana

Agency overview
- Jurisdiction: Government of Haryana
- Headquarters: Chandigarh; 30°45′40″N 76°48′2″E
- Minister responsible: Kanwar Pal
- Website: http://haryanaforest.gov.in/

Forests Department, Haryana is a department of the Government of Haryana, a state in India, that runs and maintains many protected nature areas in the state of Haryana. It has two administrative divisions: Forest and Wildlife. The department is responsible for maintaining National Parks, Wildlife Sanctuaries and Conservation Reserves in Haryana. It also provides a special emphasis on Soil and Moisture Conservation works in the hills to conserve water and deliver it to adjacent farmlands. Two National Parks, eight Wildlife Sanctuaries, two Conservation Reserves, four Animal & Bird Breeding Centres, one Deer park, and 49 herbal parks. Kanwar Pal Gujjar has been the cabinet minister responsible for this department since October 2019. constitute the Protected Area network of the department, covering 0.75% of the state. It also maintains a list of Protected Areas in Haryana.

== Administrative divisions ==
Principal Chief Conservator of Forests heads the Haryana Forests Department. There are two divisions: Wildlife Zones for wildlife and Forests Zones for forests.

=== Forests zones ===
There are two Forests Protection zones and 4 Forests circles/divisions, i.e., 2 circles per zone. Each Forests Protection Zone is headed by the Chief Conservator of Forests assisted by his subordinate Divisional Forest Officer (DFO), who heads the respective circles.

- Forests Protection Zone-1: Based at Panchkula, covers the geographical northern half of Haryana.
  - North Forests Circle/Division: Covers northeast geographical quadrant of Haryana including Shivalik Hills and down to Sonipat.
  - West Forests Circle/Division: Covers northwest geographical quadrant of Haryana including Sirsa, Hisar, Jind.
- Forests Protection Zone-2: Based at Gurugram, covers geographical southern half of Haryana.
  - Central Forests Circle/Division: Covers central geographical quadrant of Haryana including Rohtak, Jhajjar, Charkhi Dadri, Bhiwani, Mahendragarh etc.
  - South Forests Circle/Division: Covers geographical South Haryana including Faridabad, Nuh, Palwal, etc.

=== Wildlife zones ===
There are two sub zones, each one headed by the Chief Conservator of Wildlife.

- Wildlife North zone: Based at Panchkula, covers the geographical northern half of Haryana including Shivalik Hills to Sirsa, to Hisar to Rohtak.
- Wildlife South zone: Based at Gurugram, covers the geographical southern half of Haryana including Charkhi Dadri, Bhiwani, Mahendragarh, Nuh, palwal, Gurugram, Faridabad, etc.

== Flora of Haryana ==
Forests of Haryana include 3.52% area of Haryana as reserved forests, and additionally, nearly 3.62% of Haryana is under tree cover. Thus a total of 7.14% of Haryana is under tree cover against the national target of 30%, and state target of 20% land under forest cover. India's forest policy mandates bringing 20% land under forest cover with the view to having a total of 30% area under forest cover, and Haryana only has 3.9% (1,584 km^{2}) land under forest cover, which was further reduced by 79.44 km^{2} between 2014–15 and 2016-17 due to diversion of forest land to other uses. The main forest cover lies in Sivalik Hills Range in the northeast and Aravalli Hills Range in the south of Haryana. Mangar Bani is a sacred grove in Haryana Aravallis, which is also the largest and one of the oldest Neolithic sites in India with stone tools and rock paintings. Yamuna and Sarasvati (Ghaggar) rivers are sacred rivers that flow through Haryana. Dhosi Hills is one of the sacred mountains of Haryana.

By 2021, the Haryana government provides INR50 per tree per student every six months for classes 6 to 12 for planting and caring for trees for at least three years. The government is considering making it mandatory to plant and care for at least ten trees to obtain the graduation certificate from year 12. Higher degrees and students will be given ten marks for planting trees.

Forests Department, Haryana has initiated a state-wide program to plant panchavati groves in each village, along the temples, ponds, and common land. From 2021, the village identified the land for planting these groves, which will be looked after by the villagers. Within each grove, the peepal will be planted in the east, Banyan in the north, bel in the centre, amla in the west and ashoka tree in the south. Panchavati, are groves of five trees sacred to Indian-origin religions, such as Hinduism, Buddhism and Jainism. Panchvati has five types of sacred trees, however, there are more than five types of trees that are considered sacred and form the part of Panchayati. Sacred trees used in panchavati are the Vata (ficus benghalensis, Banyan), Ashvattha (ficus religiosa, Peepal), Bilva (aegle marmelos, Bengal Quince), Amalaki (phyllanthus emblica, Indian Gooseberry, Amla), Ashoka (Saraca asoca, Ashok), Udumbara (ficus racemosa, Cluster Fig, Gular), Nimba (Azadirachta indica, Neem) and Shami (prosopis spicigera, Indian Mesquite). In Hindu belief, the Kalpavriksha is a wish-granting tree. In addition to the Panchvati trees described below, the other sacred trees include the Akshayavat -a sacred fig tree, Banana leaf, Kadamba, Parijaat, Sandalwood, etc. Bodhi Tree(Banyan) is specially revered, and there are numerous large banyan trees in India. The sacred fruits and plants include the Bael, Kusha grass, Tulsi (see Tulasi chaura and Tulsi Vivah), flowers such as Lotus, Champaka, coconut, paan (betal leaf), banana leaf, etc. are also sacred. Tulsi in India is cultivated for religious and traditional medicine purposes and also for its essential oil. It is widely used as a herbal tea, commonly used in Ayurveda. It has a place within the Vaishnava tradition of Hinduism, in which devotees perform worship involving holy basil plants or leaves. The sacred flowers include the Lotus, Champaka and Marigold.

== Fauna of Haryana ==
=== Biodiversity of wild animal species ===
Gurugram and Faridabad have a high concentration of wild animals with 27 species from 14 families, including leopards, hyena, jackal, wolf, fox, jungle cat, mongoose, civet, porcupine, hare, wild pig, rhesus macaque, nilgai, grey francolin and chinkara in the rapidly degrading ecosensitive areas of Raisina, Manesar, Nuh, Mohamadpur Ahir, Bhondsi, Damdama, Mangarbani and Mandawar. Northern Aravalli leopard and wildlife corridor between from Sariska Tiger Reserve in Rajasthan to Delhi Ridge is a 200 km long important biodiversity and wildlife corridor which is a habitat for the Indian leopards and jackals of Aravalli, who often migrate between Delhi and Sariska, but the urban development, in particular the highways and railways bisecting the Aravalli range and wildlife corridor in several place pose a great risk. According to a 2019 study by Bombay Natural History Society (BNHS) at the Asola Bhatti Wildlife Sanctuary the number of golden jackal has doubled from 8 to 19 in 8 km tract where rodents and hares are their prey base along with the staple diet of zizipus jujube (jhad ber), ruddy mongoose and jungle cats are often sighted too, though striped hyena have been vanishing.

In 2021, to provide bird habitats in rapidly urbanising areas the Haryana Wildlife Department distributed 6000 bird nest boxes, 1000 each in 6 districts of South Haryana, bird houses to be given to panchayats, government offices, NGOs, etc. To cater for birds of small and medium sizes, the boxes are of two types - 9x9 inch and 1 ft. x 1 ft. Boxes need to be placed in a way that the opening faces away from the strong winds so that hatchlings are protected. Wildlife activists demanded that the government need to take more conservation action than just distributing bird boxes. In 2019, Haryana established a Sparrow Rescue and Research Centre (SRRCP) in Jodhpur village near Bhondsi Nature Camp in Aravalli mountain range in the south Haryana and earlier it had established the SJatayu Conservation and Breeding Centre at Pinjore in Shivalik mountain range in the north Haryana with the help of Bombay Natural History Society. Though International Union for Conservation of Nature has classified the sparrow as least-concerned species globally but its numbers have been declining, specially in Punjab and Haryana. Centres will be focused on conducting research on the causes of decline and to formulate action plans to reverse that.

=== Leopards ===
The Leopards of Haryana, the largest predatory mammal of the state, are found in two distinct biospheres, in the Shivalik hill range in the north especially in and around Kalesar National Park and the Morni hills forest, and also in South Haryana in the forests of Northern Aravalli leopard and wildlife corridor. Haryana has nearly 100 leopards in Shivalik and Aravalli, including 24 in Kalesar National park alone, and 40 to 45 leopards in Gurugram-Faridabad Aravali of which 35 in Gurugram alone. Large parts of Aravalli are legally and physically unprotected, with no wildlife crossings and little or no wildlife conservation work resulting in deaths of over 11 leopards in 4 years between January 2015 to January 2019. In January 2019, Wildlife Institute of India (WII) announced that they will undertake the survey of leopard and wildlife, using pugmarks and trap cameras, subsequently leopards and jackals will be tracked via the radio tracking collars. In 2019, the government of Haryana decided to fit all the leopards with radio tracking collars so that their hunting patterns can be studied and the human animal conflicts can be avoided by rescuing leopards straying in human habitations.

==== Increasing number of leopards ====
According to the Wildlife Institute of India (WII) study in 2017, the number of leopards increased in the forested areas of Aravali in Gurugram and Faridabad, from virtually none in the 1980s to 40 to 45 leopards. Leopards pugmarks have often been sighted at "Asola Bhatti wildlife sanctuary" and the contiguous forested areas of Gurugram-Faridabad Aravalli hills such as Mangar Bani, Badkhal Lake wildlife area, Mohbtabad, Roj ka Meo.

==== High leopard death rate caused by humans ====
According to a study by WII, Wildlife Conservation Society and the National Centre for Biological Sciences the number of leopard has decreased by 80% in last 100 years in India. According to Wildlife Protection Society of India (WPSI) 500 leopards died in India in 2018. In first four months of 2019, 218 leopards were killed which is 40% more than previous year, thus according to the WPSI assessment this puts leopards at higher risk of extinction than tigers due to very high mortality rate. Leopards adopt to living peacefully near the human habitats, but this also puts them at greater risk of being killed by humans due to poaching, electrocution, being hit by vehicles, etc.

Between January 2014 to January 2018, 11 leopards were killed in Faridabad-Gurugram area in 4 years, due to the increased human-animal conflict after leopards strayed in human habitations as there is scarcity of water in summer months and the man-made drinking water pits for animals in Aravallis remain empty as the water from the pipeline is misused illegally used for other construction activities. In 2019 alone, 4 leopards were killed in Gurugram, 3 on Gurugram-Faridabad road and Mandawar, a fourth one in Uttamwala village near Kalesar National Park. In October 2020, a male leopard was killed in a road accident on Gurugram-Faridabad State highway. In July 2021, another leopard was killed on Gurugram-Faridabad Road near Surajkund due to the brain haemorrhage after being hit by a vehicle.

In Haryana, large parts of Aravalli are legally and physically unprotected, with no wildlife passages and little or no wildlife conservation work. Majority of deaths happen on three highways, mostly on Faridabad-Gurugaon road followed by NH-48 Delhi-Chennai Highway and Kundli-Manesar-Palwal Expressway (KMPE), all of these cut through the wildlife corridor from Asola Wildlife Sanctuary in Delhi to Sariska in Rajasthan passing through Gurugram (Mangar-Bandhwari). Highest number of leopard deaths happen on Gurugram-Faridabad Highway which bisects these forested wildlife areas, which often results in the accidental death of wildlife including leopards. Along with leopard, other animals such as the jackals, nilgai (blue bull), mongoose and other wild animals are frequently killed on these highways. Leopards often stray into human habitation, such as along the Golf Course Road and Gurugram-Faridabad Road, as this whole area is part of Northern Aravalli leopard and wildlife corridor. As of June 2021, an average of 50,000 vehicles travel on the Faridabad-Gurugram Road. There is demand to build wildlife crossing underpasses and overpasses on Faridabad-Gurugaon road, NH48 and KMPE. As of May 2020 on the 25 km long Gurgaon-Faridabad road, Gurgaon has installed lights on the 11 km stretch falling in its area, whereas Faridabad is yet to install lights, making it harder for drivers to spot the wildlife on the road on the stretch of the road falling in the Faridabad district. In May 2020, the Detailed Project Report (DPR) and survey for the 32 km long Gurugaon-Faridabad metro link from Vatika CHowk in Gururam to Bata Chowk in Faridabad with 28 km elevated stretch along the Gurugaon-Faridabad Road was completed which will have 8 stations, this will reduce the vehicular traffic on the Gurugaon-Faridabad road in the sensitive wildlife area.

"Wildlife SOS Transit Facility", an NGO based in Gopalpur village of Gurugram, was established with the help of Haryana Forests Department to create awareness about the wildlife conservation, rescue of trapped of injured wildlife, rehabilitation and release back into wildlife and providing permanent shelter to those which could not be released. Haryana government has been running awareness camps in the villages on how to minimise the human-animal conflicts.

==== Gurugram Wildlife & Leopard Safari Park ====
Gurugram Wildlife Safari Park, the world's largest wildlife safari outside Africa, is being jointly developed by the Haryana Govt and India's Ministry of Environment, Forest and Climate Change. It will be spread over 10,000 acres of land, five times bigger than second largest 2,000 acres of curated wildlife safari in Sharjah. Managed by the newly created Aravali Foundation, it will have 4 separate free-ranging zones for 4 big cats (leopards, tigers, lions, cheetas), bird park and aviary, serpentarium, a large area for herbivore wildlife, zone for exotic animals and birds not native to India, underwater world oceanarium, several climate-zone specific (equatorial, tropical, sub-tropical Indian coastal forests, and desert gardens), botanical gardens, biomes, nature trails, wildlife tourism zones, and visitors facilities.Central Zoo Authority (CZA) has granted approval. Two international companies have been shortlisted after the global invitation for the EOI (expression of interest) for designing, building and operating the park. It will be similar in concept to the Etawah Safari Park, is being implemented near sector 76 at Sakatpur and Garat Pur Bas villages in Aravalli hills of Gurugram, in September 2019 panchayat had already approved the transfer of panchayat common land to the wildlife department. Government is also developing a new lake in 10 acres natural depression of Gairatpur Bas 10 km from Rajiv Chowk on the Delhi-Gurgaon expressway by piping treated sewage water from the Behrampur sewage treatment plant (STP) in Sector 72 through a 3.5 km pipeline as the nearby Damdama Lake dries up in summers and also needs rejuvenation.

The 10,000-acre safari will be developed in 4 phases, of which Phase-1 will be spread across 2,500 acres. It will have 4 entry gates, four entry gates – near Naurangpur (east of Manesar) and Sakatpur in the north, near Sohna on Delhi-Mumbai Expressway in the east, on the Taoru–Sohna NH-919 in the south. Aravalli Foundation, including international consultants for technical and environmental guidance, was established by the Haryana Government for the execution and ongoing management of the project. The 2,500 acre phase-I, with the "international-level facilities", entails enclosures for big cats, aviary, a herpetarium for amphibians and reptiles, botanical gardens, nature trails, and an underwater world exhibit. 20,000 trees of local native plant species will be planted in 750 acres "Matri Van" along the Gurgaon-Faridabad Road as part of the Aravalli Green Wall Project to reforest and restore the mountain range.

Other leopard safaris in India are at Sanjay Gandhi National Park in Mumbai, "Bengal Safari Park" at Siliguri near Gorumara National Park, and in Gujarat at Surat district at Khodamba village of Mandvi taluka with 35 leopards in 50 hectare as well as Dangs district at Waghai Taluka with 54 leopards in 35 hectares.

== Conservation efforts ==
=== Legal and institutional ===
==== Legal framework - Natural Conservation Zones (NCZs) ====
In 2019, Haryana government passed the amendment to the Punjab Land Alienation Act, 1900 (PLPA), which had obtained ascent from the governor but has not yet been notified by the Haryana government, whence it is in limbo and has not officially become a law. This amendment remove the legal protection for the large forest areas which act as green lungs and buffer zone against pollution, thus further degrading Haryana's ecology, biodiversity, air quality, water table recharge rate. Haryana government submitted a proposal to "NCR Planning Board" (NCRPB) to reduce Haryana's Natural Conservation Zones (NCZs) by removing 60,000 acres of Aravalli land. After this Haryana's NCZ will decrease by 47% from 122,113.30 hectares to only 64,384.66 hectares.

These forest lands proposed to be removed from the NCZ are mostly part of village common land, and after the legal NCZ status is removed these will become available for real estate construction and commercial sale. This is in violation of multiple guidelines of the Supreme Court of India which defines the forest by its natural definition. This also violates the NCRPB goal of limiting construction activities to mere 0.5% area of NCZ. NCRPB notification also clearly states that this original 122,113.30 hectares ecologically sensitive forest of South Haryana is a forest, "The major natural features, identified as environmentally sensitive areas, are the extension of Aravalli ridge in Rajasthan, Haryana and NCT-Delhi; forest areas; rivers and tributaries... major lakes and water bodies such as Badkhal lake, Suraj Kund and Damdama in Haryana sub-region".

==== Biodiversity Board ====
Haryana Biodiversity Board was established by the government in 2018 to protect and preserve the biodiversity of forests, flora and fauna in the state, specially in the biodiversity hotspots of Shivalik and Aravali hills that are under threat. Forests areas of the state were digitised with the help of Haryana Space Applications Centre, Hisar and ISRO. Assets and plants monitoring system for managing forests, nurseries, trees, etc. had been made online.

To protect the environment 2,200 community self-help groups and 2,487 village biodiversity groups were formed and 25,000 women were trained in 2018. MoU were signed with NHAI and Indian Railways to plant trees along national highways and rail lines, and a policy has been formed to establish city forests. A 50,000 hectare self-help community herbal forest is being established in SHivalik hills with the guidance of Baba Ramdev's Patanjali Yogpeeth. Trap cameras were set up in Kalesar National Park and 23 leopards were found. Endangered eagles were released in wild from the Jatayu Conservation Breeding Centre, Pinjore after successful breeding. Pipli and Rohtak zoos were being modernised.

==== Water conservation entities ====
Haryana government has established the following:

- Haryana Pond and Waste Water Management Authority (HPWMA), also called the Haryana Pond Authority (HPA)
- Haryana Waste Resource Authority (HWRA))

=== Issue based initiatives ===
==== Green corridors ====
A 1,600 km long and 5 km wide The Great Green Wall of Aravalli green ecological corridor along Aravalli range from Gujarat to Delhi which will also connect to Shivalik hill range is being considered with planting of 1.35 billion (135 crore) new native trees over 10 years to combat the pollution, 51% of which is caused by the industrial pollution, 27% by vehicles, 8% by crop burning and 5% by Diwali fireworks.

There are no wildlife crossings in Haryana, NCR or Delhi-Sariska Wildlife corridor, and there is a need for additional crossings, such as those needed at Delhi Mumbai Expressway.

==== Urban wildlife corridor in NCR ====
NCR Wildlife Corridor, also called Delhi Wildlife Corridor', will be jointly developed by Haryana and Delhi governments as India's first urban wildlife corridor by building underpasses to ensure safe passage for wild animals, especially leopards, who frequent the roads in the forested and hilly areas in Delhi, Gurgram, Faridabad and Nuh. Leopards are seen as far as Sultanpur metro depot, and Delhi government has deployed drones and installed wildlife cameras to track the leopards in that area, once trapped they are released in the Asola Bhatti Wildlife Sanctuary. As of June 2021, it was in the planning phase.

==== Wetlands conservation and ground water recharge ====
In 2021, as per NASA the rate of groundwater depletion in India is 1 metre per year whereas in Haryana it is 3 metres per year.

In 2021, as per Central Ground Water Authority (CGWA) data the water table in Haryana's 85 Community Development Block (CD Blocks) out of a total of 141 blocks was categorised in red category. In 2004, only 55 blocks were in red category, thus red zone blocks have increased by 30% in the last 17 years. 14 out of 22 districts of Haryana are in red zone. Haryana annually extracts 137% of its groundwater compared to its annual groundwater recharge, whereas national average is only 63%. Main culprit it water intensive paddy crop, consequently Haryana government was aiming to reduce the area under paddy cultivation by 200,000 (2 lakh) in year 2021 alone through providing financial incentives, aggressive regulation, monitoring and people's participatory. India is the world's largest groundwater user by volume. Haryana's annual groundwater recharge from rain and canals is 10.15 billion cubic metres (bcm), 9.13 bcm is extractable (one cubic metre has 1,000 litres), annual groundwater extraction in 2021 was 12.50 bcm including 11.53 bcm for agricultural irrigation and 0.63 bcm for domestic and 0.34 bcm for industrial use. More groundwater is withdrawn in over half of Haryana than recharged each year, thus causing rapid continuous depletion of groundwater table. Haryana has initiated regular water audit and 1,700 piezometers were installed in critical red blocks for real-time monitoring of the groundwater table. As of 2021, Haryana has initiated union government and World Bank funded INR Rs 678 crore "Atal Bhujal Yojana" which aims to reduce groundwater depletion by 50% by 2025, this project will run in 1669 gram panchayats of 36 blocks in 14 districts. "The major objective of this scheme is to create hydrogeological data network of groundwater resources in Haryana and encourage creation of community institutions for the management of groundwater resources in the state."

On 1 November 2017, Chief Minister of Haryana Manohar Lal Khattar announced that Government of Haryana will form the Haryana Pond and Waste Water Management Authority (also called the Haryana Pond Authority (HPA), see also Haryana Waste Resource Authority (HWRA)) to rejuvenate and manage 14,000 ponds (colloquially called "johad") in Haryana by digging the silt out every year. This includes development of 50 to 60 lakes in National Capital Region falling within the Haryana state.

2019 Atal Bhujal Yojana (Atal groundwater scheme), a 5 years (2020-21 to 2024-25) scheme costing INR 6 billion (US$85 million) for managing demand side with village panchayat level water security plans entailing johad rejuvenation (wetland) and groundwater recharge, was approved for implementation in 8,350 water-stressed villages across 7 states, including Haryana, Rajasthan, Gujarat, Madhya Pradesh, Uttar Pradesh, Karnataka, and Maharashtra.

==== Environmental pollution of rivers ====
In July 2021, during the multi-department Haryana "River Rejuvenation Committee" (RRC) meeting the Haryana State Pollution Control Board (HSPCB) informed that it has formed district-level committees to stop illegal discharge into Yamuna and Ghaggar rivers. Action taken and status was reported as follows:

- Yamuna catchment
  - Sewerage discharge: Of 155 locations identified with 100.5 millions of litres daily (MLD) sewage discharge, 90 locations with 48.15 MLD discharge have been diverted, 47 locations were in work-in-progress (WIP), and for remaining 18 locations work was yet to commence. The WIP sewerage laying were Yamunanagar, Palwal, Rohtak, Faridabad, Karnal and Bahadurgarh.
  - Industrial discharge: Of 126 locations identified, work was pending for 34. Most of industrial water pollution is from Panipat.
- Ghaggar catchment
  - Sewerage discharge: Of 56 locations identified with 42.25 MLD sewage discharge, only 28 locations with 21.08 MLD discharge have been diverted, 13 locations were in work-in-progress (WIP), and for remaining 14 locations work was yet to commence. The WIP sewerage laying were Ambala, Kaithal, Jakhal Mandi, and Hisar.
  - Industrial discharge: Of 255 locations identified, work was pending for 69.

== See also ==
- National Parks & Wildlife Sanctuaries of Haryana
- Divisions of Haryana
