= Haryana Tourism Corporation =

Indian company

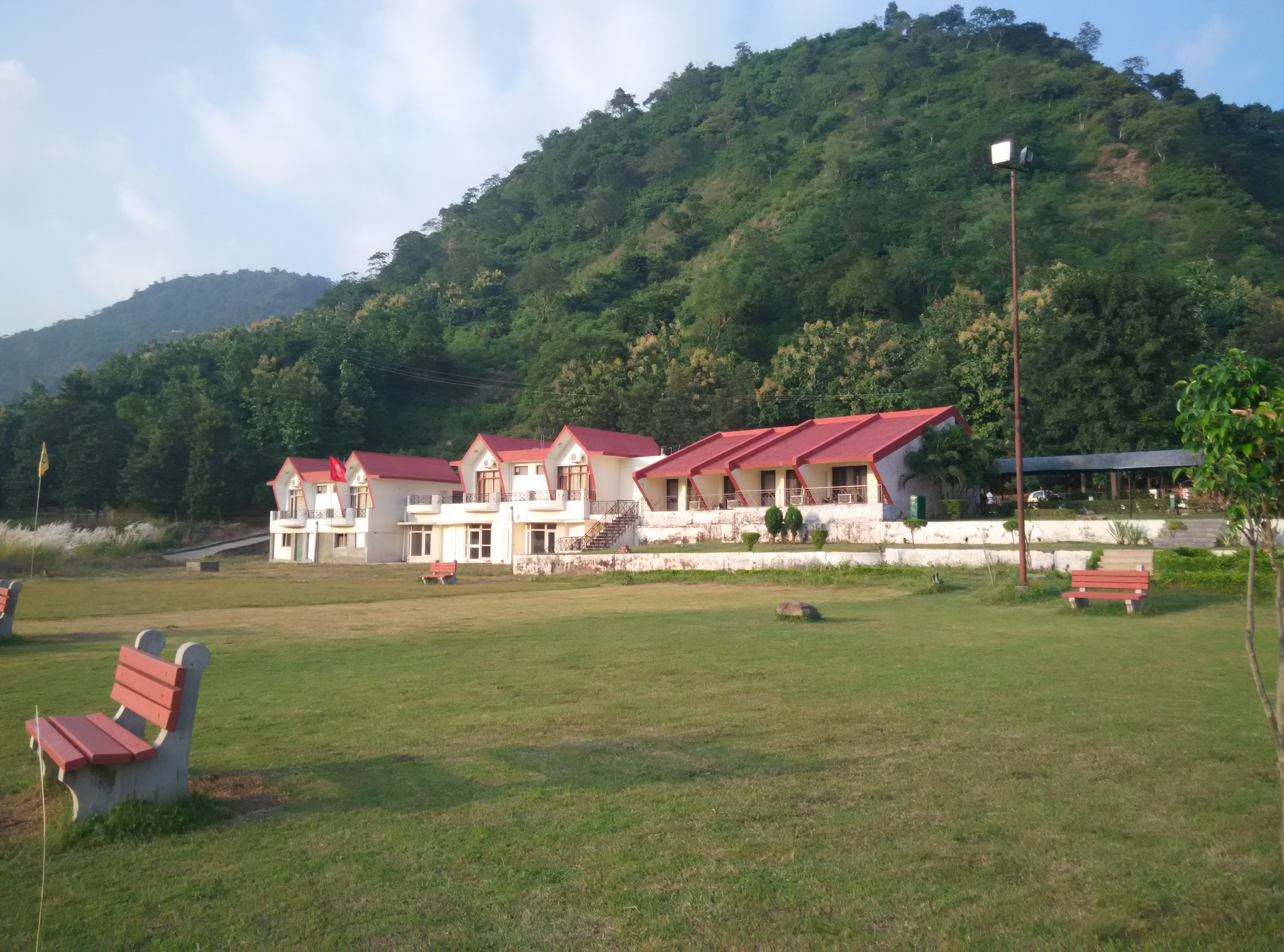
- Haryana Tourism Resort at Tikkar Taal, Panchkula District. (Near Chandigarh).
- Company type: Haryana Government undertaking
- Founded: 1 September 1974
- Headquarters: Chandigarh, India
- Area served: Haryana, India
- Key people: Ram Sarup Verma, IAS

Haryana Tourism Corporation (HTC) is an agency of the Government of Haryana, India established in 1974. The organisation operates 44 tourist facilities spread across the state of Haryana. These facilities offer visitors lodging, dining, and recreational activities amongst other services.

== See also ==
- List of Monuments of National Importance in Haryana
- List of State Protected Monuments in Haryana
- List of Indus Valley Civilisation sites
- List of National Parks & Wildlife Sanctuaries of Haryana, India
- Surajkund hot spring
- Anagpur Dam - 2 km from Surajkund
- Asigarh Fort at Hansi
- Tosham rock inscription at Tosham
