= Tosham rock inscription =

Historic rock inscription in Haryana, India

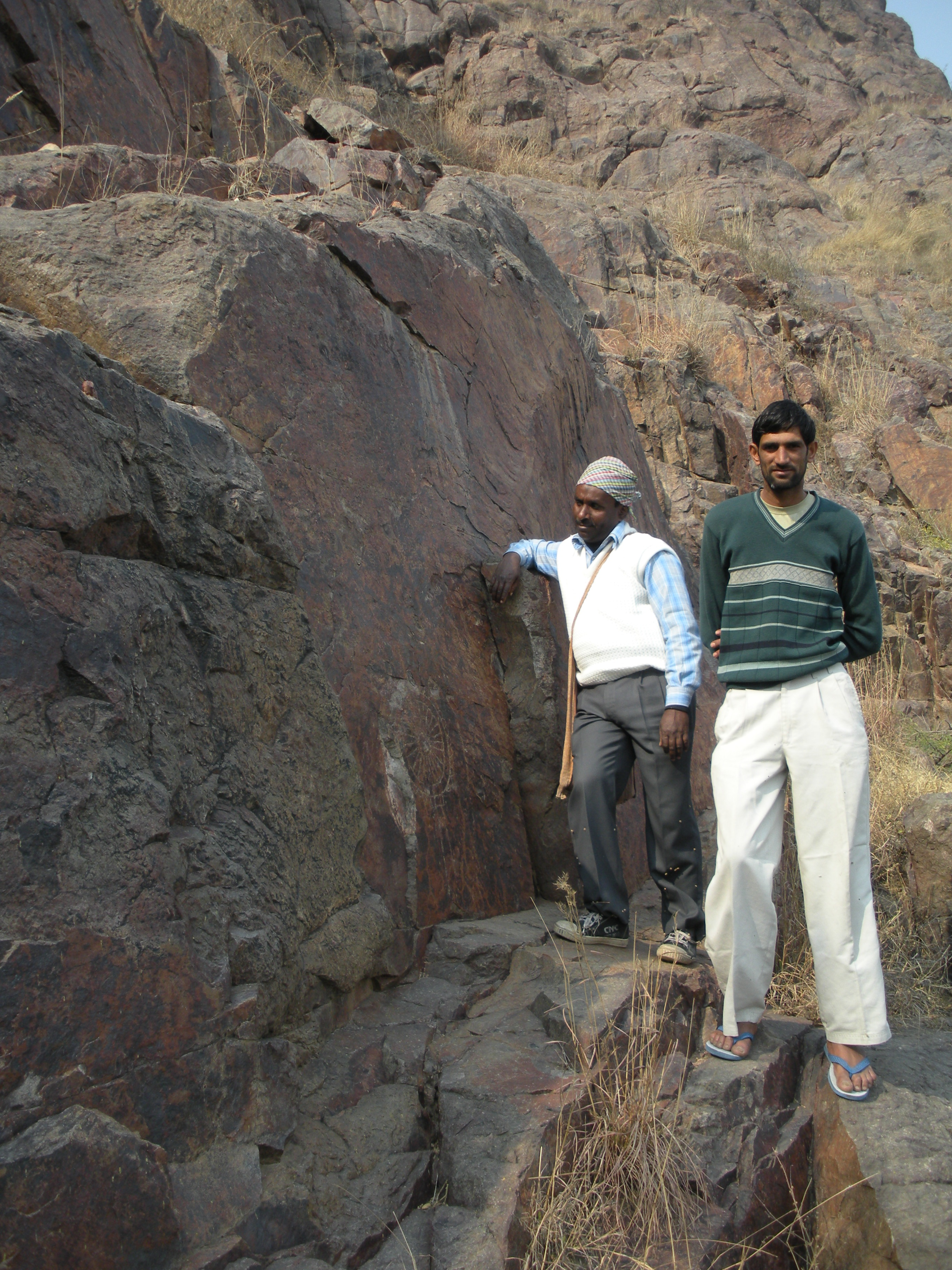
Hill at Toshām showing the site of the ancient monastery and water cascade

The Tosham rock inscription, dating from the 4th or 5th century, on Tosham hill in Tosham town of Haryana state in India, is an epigraph documenting the establishment of a monastery and the building of water tanks for followers of the Satvata in ancient Yadava Kingdoms. They also built the Kalayat Ancient Bricks Temple Complex and may have been vassals of the Satavahana dynasty, which disintegrated into smaller kingdoms in the 3rd century, during the Gupta Empire.

== Location ==
Tosham or Toshām is located in Bhiwani District, Haryana, India. The inscription is carved on a smooth rock face, high above about the town. In the immediate area are ruined brick structures and other archaeological traces. There are also Tosham Rock Paintings and Tosham Hill Fort on Tosham Hill.

== Description and contents ==
The inscription records the lineage and building activities of a line of Sātvata religious preceptors (ācārya) dating to the 4th and 5th centuries CE. This is an important record for the history of the Vaiṣṇava faith. The kinship and clan position of the Sātvatas is described in the article on the Yadavas.

The inscription was first published by John Faithfull Fleet in his 1888 publication Corpus Inscriptionum Indicarum. A new translation and fresh analysis was undertaken by M. Willis in The Archaeology of Hindu Ritual, published in 2009.

== Text ==
jitaṃ abhīkṣṇam eva jāmbavatīvadanāravindorjjitāḷinā
dānavāṅganāmukhāmbhojalakṣmītuṣāreṇa viṣṇunā
anekapuruṣābhyāgatāryyasātvatayogācārya-
bhagavadbhaktayaśastrātaprapautrasyācāryyaviṣṇutrātapautrasyācāryya-
vasudattap[u]trasya rāvaṇyām utpannasya gotamasagotrasyācāryyaopāddhyāya-
yaśastrāta[ān]ujasyācāryyasomatrātasyedaṃ bhagavatpādopayo-
jyaṃ kuṇḍam uparyyāvasathaḥ ku-
ṇḍaṃ cāparaṃ

Translation: "Verily victory has been achieved again and again by Viṣṇu – a mighty bee on the water lily that is the face of Jāmbavatī – a very frost to the beauty of the water lilies which are the faces of the women of the demons! This reservoir and the residence above, and a second reservoir, intended for the use of the feet of the Lord, (are the work) of the ācārya Somatrāta, the great grandson of Yaśastrāta – a successor of many men (of preceding generations), an Ārya Sātvata, yogācārya and devotee of the Lord – the grandson of ācārya Viṣṇutrāta (and) the son, begotten on Rāvaṇī, of ācārya Vasudatta of the Gotama gotra (and) the younger brother of ācārya and upādhyāya Yaśastrāta."

== Tosham rock paintings ==
An Indian newspaper, the Tribune, reported that in 2013, rock paintings (dated to circa 5th century CE) were discovered at the site of the Tosham rock inscription. These rock paintings were said to include figures such as a royal family, a saint, and an orange dinosaur.
