= List of zoos in India =

This is a list of zoos in India. For a list of aquaria, see List of aquaria in India.

Zoos are primarily dry facilities where animals are confined within enclosures and displayed to the public, and in which they may also be bred. Such facilities include zoos, safari parks, animal theme parks, aviaries, butterfly zoos, and reptile centres, as well as wildlife sanctuaries and nature reserves where visitors are allowed.

The oldest zoo in India is Marble Palace Zoo, Kolkata. The zoo and park was opened in 1854.

The Central Zoo Authority of India (CZA) is the Governing Authority of all Zoos in India, and is an associate member of the World Association of Zoos and Aquariums (WAZA).

== Zoos in India ==
	Name	City	State	Smart Zoo?	Notability
1	Alipore Zoological Gardens	Kolkata	West Bengal	yes	The only zoo to successfully breed northern giraffe
2	Amirthi Zoological Park	Vellore	Tamil Nadu	No	
3	Arignar Anna Zoological Park (Vandalur Zoo)	Chennai	Tamil Nadu	No	First zoo in India
4	Assam State Zoo-cum-Botanical Garden	Guwahati	Assam	No	
5	Bannerghatta Biological Park	Bengaluru	Karnataka	No	
6	Birsa Deer Park (Birsa Mrig Vihar)	Ranchi	Jharkhand	No	
7	Bondla Wildlife Sanctuary	Ponda	Goa	No	
8	Black Buck Breeding Centre (Pipli Mini Zoo)	Pipli	Haryana	No	
9	Mahendra Chaudhary Zoological Park	Zirakpur	Punjab	No	
10	Chennai Snake Park Trust	Chennai	Tamil Nadu	No	
11	Chinkara Breeding Centre	near Bahal	Haryana	No	
12	Crocodile Breeding Centre, Bhaur Saidan	Kurukshetra	Haryana	No	
13	Crocodile Breeding Centre	Ranchi	Jharkhand	No	
14	Crocodile Rehabilitation and Research Centre	Thiruvananthapuram	Kerala	No	In honour of Steve Irwin
15	Shaheed Ashfaq Ullah Khan Prani Udyan (Gorakhpur Zoological Gardens)	Gorakhpur	Uttar Pradesh	No	
16	Gorewada Zoo	Nagpur	Maharashtra	Yes	
17	Gopalpur Zoo	Gopalpur	Himachal Pradesh	No	
18	Gulab Bagh and Zoo	Udaipur	Rajasthan	No	
19	Deer Park (Mini Zoo)	Sambalpur	Odisha	No	
20	Hisar Deer Park	Hisar	Haryana	No	
21	Indira Gandhi Park	Rourkela	Odisha		
22	Indira Gandhi Zoological Park	Visakhapatnam	Andhra Pradesh	No	3rd largest in India and is also responsible for breeding of ring tailed lemurs
23	Indore Zoo	Indore	Madhya Pradesh	No	
24	Jaipur Zoo	Jaipur	Rajasthan	No	
25	Jawaharlal Nehru Biological Park	Bokaro Steel City	Jharkhand	No	responsible for breeding of mandrills
26	Jijamata Udyaan	Mumbai	Maharashtra	No	
27	Kakatiya Zoological Park	Warangal	Telangana	No	
28	Kamala Nehru Zoological Park	Ahmedabad	Gujarat	No	
29	Kurukshetra Zoo	Kurukshetra	Haryana	No	
30	Lucknow Zoo	Lucknow	Uttar Pradesh	No	
31	Madras Crocodile Bank Trust	Chennai	Tamil Nadu	Yes	One of the best reptile conservation zoos of world. They are known for success of saving many critically endangered native and exotic reptiles. They are also known for successfully breeding these reptiles
32	Maitri Bagh	Bhilai Nagar	Chhattisgarh	No	Largest zoo in Chhattisgarh & made by India-Soviet Union Friendship
33	Manda Zoo	Jammu City	Jammu and Kashmir	No	
34	Marble Palace Zoo	Kolkata	West Bengal	No	
35	Sri Chamarajendra Zoological Gardens (Mysuru Zoo)	Mysuru	Karnataka	Yes	
36	Maharajbagh Zoo	Nagpur	Maharashtra	No	
37	Nagaland Zoological Park	Chümoukedima	Nagaland	No	
38	Nandankanan Zoological Park	Bhubaneswar	Odisha	No	(2nd largest in India
39	National Zoological Park	New Delhi	National Capital Territory of Delhi	No	
40	Nehru Zoological Park	Hyderabad	Telangana	No	
41	Padmaja Naidu Himalayan Zoological Park	Darjeeling	West Bengal	Yes	This zoo is renowned for its global breeding of snow leopard and red panda
42	Parassinikkadavu Snake Park	Parassinikkadavu	Kerala	No	
43	Peacock & Chinkara Breeding Centre	Rewari	Haryana	No	
44	Pilikula Biological Park	Mangaluru	Karnataka	Yes	The Zoo is renowned for its exotic primates and focus on conservation and breeding for western ghat wildlife
45	Pheasant Breeding Centre, Berwala	Panchkula	Haryana	No	
46	Pheasant Breeding Centre	Morni	Haryana	No	
47	G. B. Pant High Altitude Zoo	Nainital	Uttarakhand	No	
48	Rajiv Gandhi Zoological Park	Pune	Maharashtra	No	
49	Bhagwan Birsa Biological Park	Ranchi	Jharkhand	No	(est. 1987)
50	Rohtak Zoo	Rohtak	Haryana	No	
51	Sakkarbaug Zoological Garden	Junagadh	Gujarat	Yes One of the few Zoo to successfully  breed vultures,wild asses,cranes & stork(yes,even demoseille and sarus crane) and pure breeded lions	
52	Sanjay Gandhi Jaivik Udyan	Patna	Bihar	No	Famous for Rhinoceros conservation
53	Sarthana Zoo	Surat	Gujarat	No	
54	Pradhyuman Zoological Park	Rajkot	Gujarat	No	
55	Sarnath Deer Park	Varanasi	Uttar Pradesh	No	
56	Sayaji Baug Zoo	Vadodara	Gujarat	No	
57	Sipahijola Wildlife Sanctuary	Sipahijola	Tripura	No	
58	Sri Venkateswara Zoological Park	Tirupati	Andhra Pradesh	No	Largest in India
59	Tata Steel Zoological Park	Jamshedpur	Jharkhand	No	
60	Thiruvananthapuram Zoo	Thiruvananthapuram	Kerala	No	Built by Maharaja of Travancore
61	Thrissur Zoo	Thrissur	Kerala	No	
62	Vulture Conservation and Breeding Centre	Pinjore	Haryana	No	
63	Etawah Safari Park	Etawah	Uttar Pradesh	No	
64	Nandan Van Zoo	Raipur	Chhattisgarh	No	Asia's largest man-made Jungle Safari
65	Kanpur Zoological Park	Kanpur	Uttar Pradesh	No	
66	Kanan Pendari Zoological Garden	Bilaspur	Chhattisgarh	No	
67	Sidhharth Garden and Zoo	Chhatrapati Sambhaji Nagar	Maharashtra	No	
68	Gwalior Zoo	Gwalior	Madhya Pradesh	No	
69	Malsi Deer Park	Dehradun	Uttarakhand	No	
71	Jambu zoo	Jammu	Jammu and Kashmir	No	
70	White Tiger Safari & Zoo	Satna	Madhya Pradesh	No	World's 1st White Tiger Safari

== missing zoos from list ==
[Sardar patel Zoological Park] [Aizwal Zoological Park] [Bengal Safari Siliguri] [Harinalaya mini Zoo (Eco park Kolkata)] [Manipur Zoological Park] [Puthoor Zoological Park] [Nahargarh Biological Park] [Vantara Rescue and Rehabilitation Centre] There are 7 other zoos missing that are not written here

== See also ==
- List of botanical gardens in India
- List of zoos
- List of national parks of India
- Wildlife sanctuaries of India
