= Maharajbagh Zoo =

Zoo in Nagpur, Maharashtra, India

Maharajbagh zoo
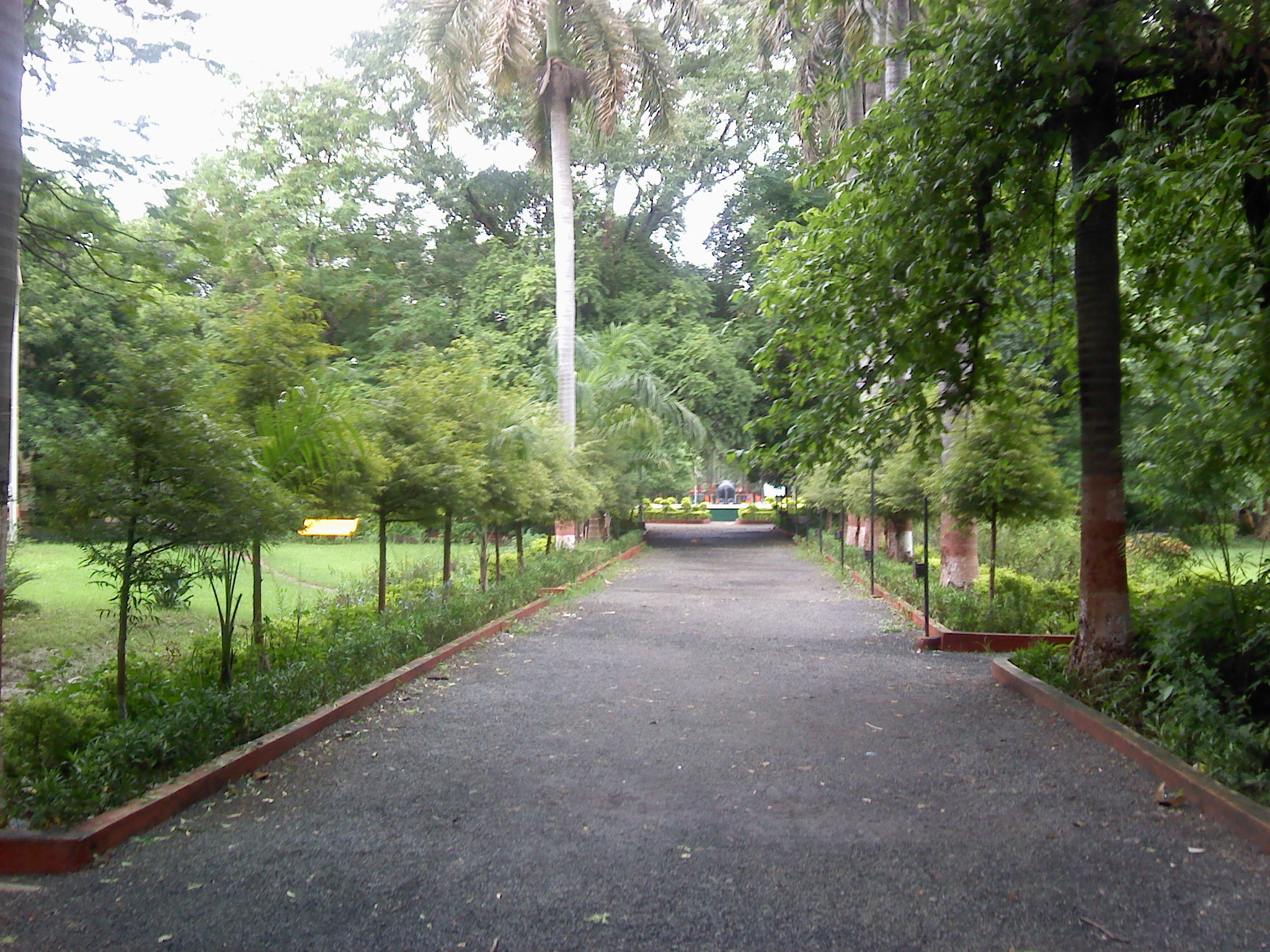
- A view of Maharajbagh Garden
- Interactive map of Maharajbagh zoo
- 21.143521°N 79.076462°E
- Location: Panjabrao Deshmukh Krishi Vidyapeeth, Nagpur
- Memberships: Central Zoo Authority
- Website: www.cza.nic.in

Maharajbagh Zoo is the central zoo of Nagpur, India. The zoo is located in the heart of the city and has been built on the garden of the Bhonsle and Maratha rulers of the city. The zoo comes under the Central Zoo Authority (CZA) of India and is maintained by the Panjabrao Deshmukh Krishi Vidyapeeth (PKV) of Nagpur. The zoo had come under scrutiny in 2006 for possible closure due to issues concerning animal healthcare but was cleared of all objections raised by CZA in 2007. The Government of Maharashtra has approved a new safari park of international standards next to Gorewada Lake in the city. Animals from Maharajbagh zoo would be moved to this new animal park but the older zoo will remain open for new animals.

== Zoo ==
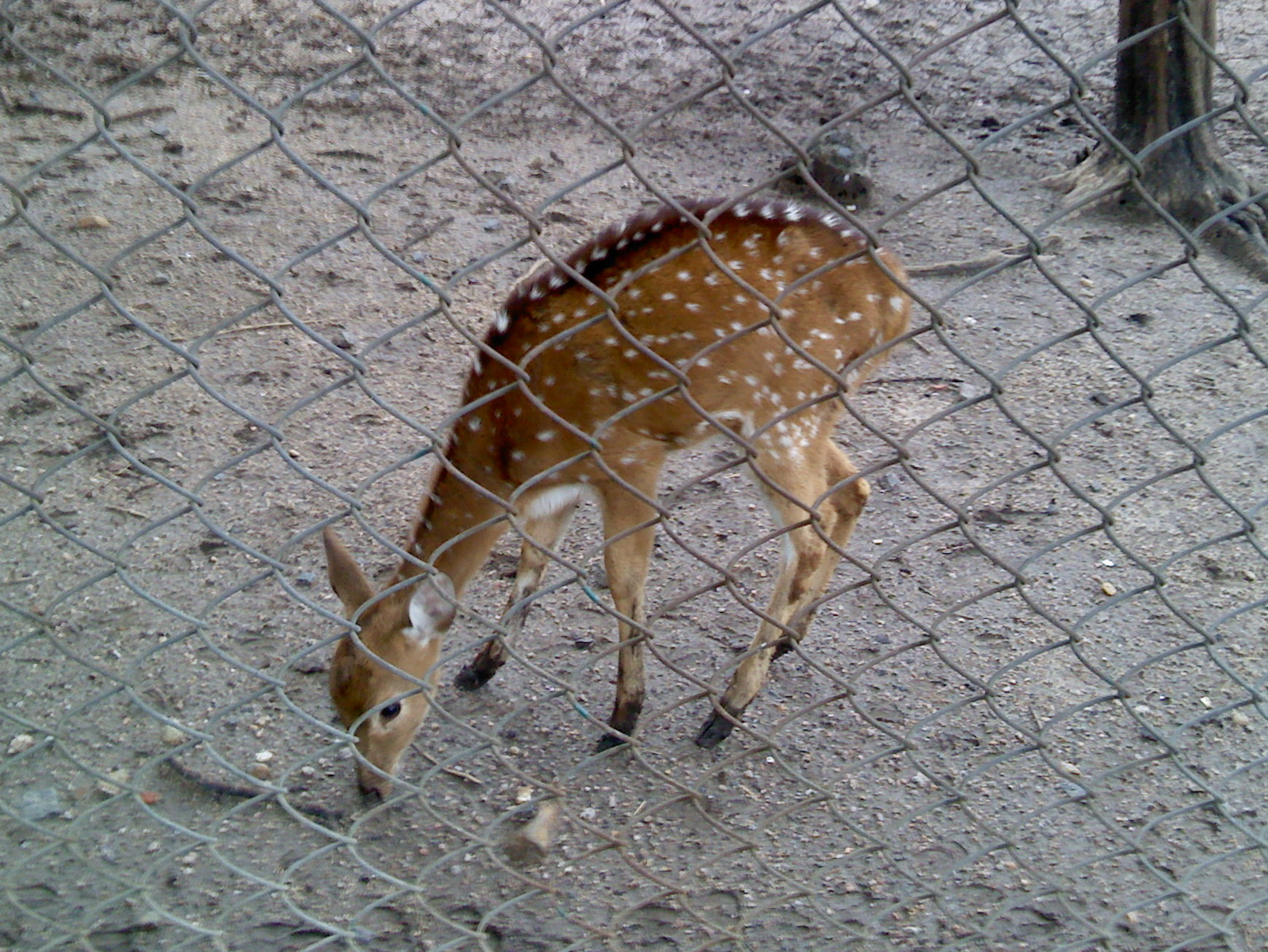
A spotted deer at Maharajbagh

The zoo is home to leopards, lions, tigers, peacocks and other animals. One of the famous attractions in the zoo - a pair of leopards - Julie and Gopal died of old age in 2006. The pair’s cub is still in the zoo.

== Closure notice and later recognition ==
Maharajbagh zoo is one of the smaller zoos in India and has consistently faced a shortage of funds for expansion and maintenance. In 2006, the Ministry of Environment and Forests (India) ordered the Maharashtra government to close smaller zoos in the state if they did not comply with the 1998 National Zoo policy. These orders applied to Nagpur’s zoo as it lacked open enclosures for its animals. Among the 51 objections raised by CZA were that lack of a wall along the nearby open nullah, or water channel, could cause infections among the animals. INR 1 lacs from Nagpur Municipal Corporation helped build a wall and open enclosures and the zoo was cleared of notice.

The zoo came under controversy in August 2009, Nagpur's Guardian Minister Balasaheb Thorat entered a tiger's cage flouting India's Wildlife (Protection) Act 1972.

== Project Gorewada ==
In 2001 the Government of Maharashtra had planned a zoo complying with international standards and two locations, Goregaon in Mumbai and Gorewada in Nagpur, were shortlisted. Due to space limitations in Mumbai, the Gorewada site was selected. In 2006, the State government approved the new 1,700 acres (6.9 km^{2}) safari park on Forest Department land near Gorewada lake. Project Gorewada will be based on the example of Singapore's animal parks and will cost around INR 500 crore. The project is expected to attract 25 to 30 lakh tourists each year and will boost Vidarbha's economy. The project will a zoological park satisfying international standards, a botanical garden, a breeding centre, a safari park, night safari, wetlands, an interpretation centre and eco-tourism, a rare combination in India. The State government is in the process of creating the Gondwana Foundation entrusted with some autonomy to finance and build the project. Initially, the Singapore-based Bernard Harrison and Friends were selected for preparing the master plan of the project and now the state government will invite new tenders on a Build Operate Transfer basis for this project.
