= Jambu zoo =

Jambu Zoo
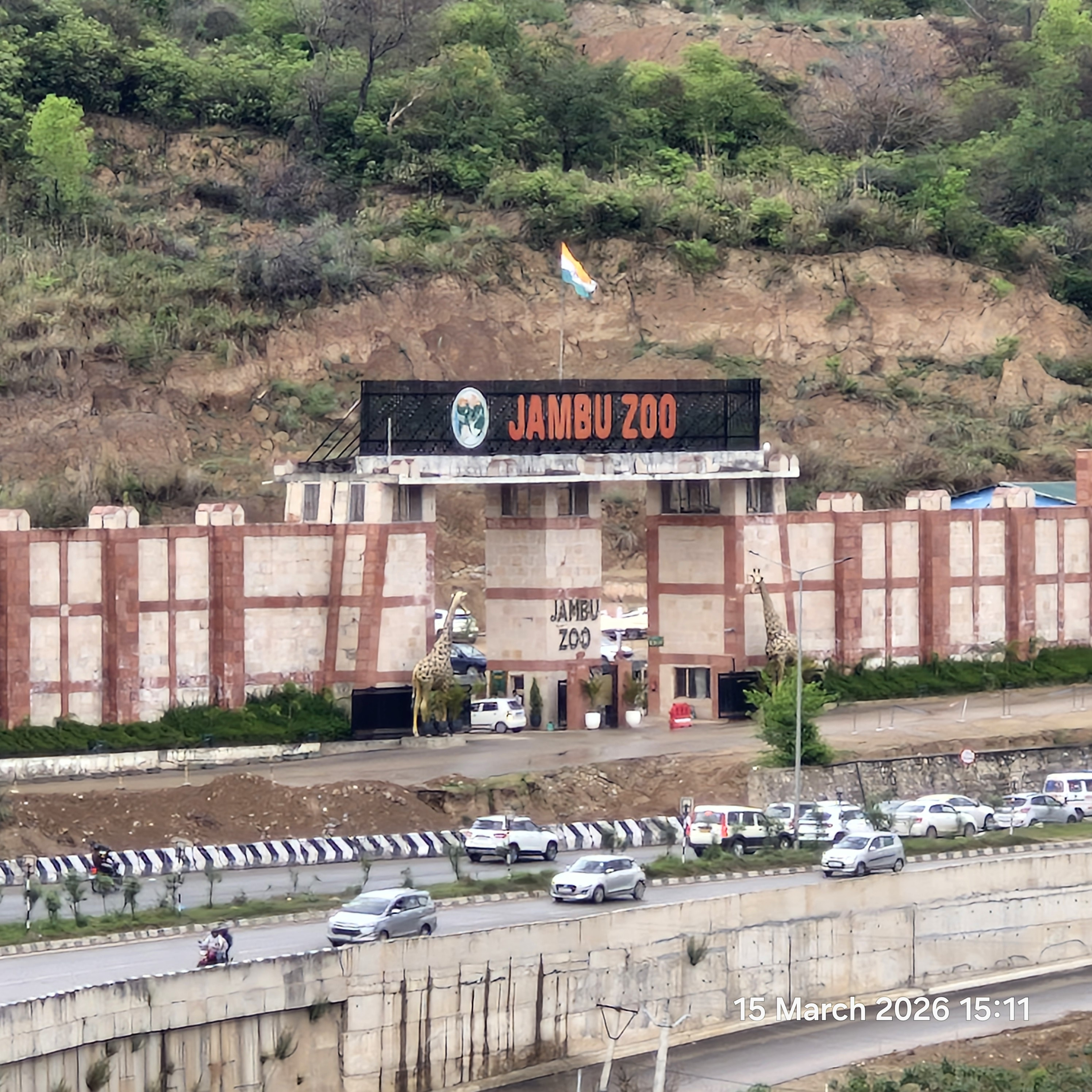
- Main Entrance of the Zoo.
- Interactive map of Jambu Zoo
- 32.791927°N 74.892688°E
- Date opened: 28 May 2023; 3 years ago
- Location: Nagrota, Jammu and Kashmir, India
- Land area: 163 Hectare
- No. of species: 27
- Annual visitors: 2.5 Lakhs
- Website: https://jambuzoo.org/

Jambu Zoo is located in the outskirts of Jammu city in Nagrota, Jammu and Kashmir, India. The zoo was inaugurated on 28 May 2023. Its first phase is planned for 70 hectare and second phase to expand making total area of 163 hectare.

Its initial animals were shifted from Manda Zoo which was only 2.5 hectare. Initial animals included leopards, Himalayan black bear, Sambhar deer, etc. It got its first main attraction as Royal Bengal Tiger on 16 November 2023. The zoo got a couple of Asiatic lions from Gujarat on 7 November 2023. The pair is housed in a dedicated Lion enclosure having a space of more than 5500 square meter as per the Central Zoo Authority norms with heating and ventilation facility for local extreme weather conditions. The couple gave birth to two female cubs on 5 March 2025. They were named Kutki and Bhunki by the staff.

On 17 November 2025, the zoo got a couple of Striped Hyenas from Nahargarh Biological Park near Jaipur in exchange of two Himalayan Black Bears as per the ‘Animal collection plan’ of the Jambu Zoo approved by the CZA.

On 17 April 2025, the zoo got two Indian wolves from Sakkarbaug Zoological Garden, Junagadh, Gujarat in exchange for one pair of leopards.

On 12 March 2026, in a significant development for the zoo, under an exchange program Jambu Zoo got its first pair of Hippopotamuses from Arignar Anna Zoological Park, Chennai in exchange of a pair of Himalayan black bears and a pair of leopards. The transport of the animals was facilitated by Indian Railways.

== Animal species exhibits ==
=== Mammals section ===
Carnivorous

- Royal Bengal Tiger
- Asiatic Lion
- Leopard
- Striped Hyena
- Indian Wolf
- Masked palm civet
- Leopard Cat
- Jungle Cat

Omnivorous

- Himalayan black bear
- Himalayan brown bear
- wild boar

Herbivorous

- Hippopotamuses
- black buck
- sambar deer
- chital deer
- Hog deer
- Barking deer
- Nilgai
- Indian porcupine

=== Birds section ===
- Indian Peafowl
- Emu
- Helmeted guinea fowl

=== Reptile section ===
- Indian python
- ghariyal
- crocodile
- Russell's viper

== Gallery ==
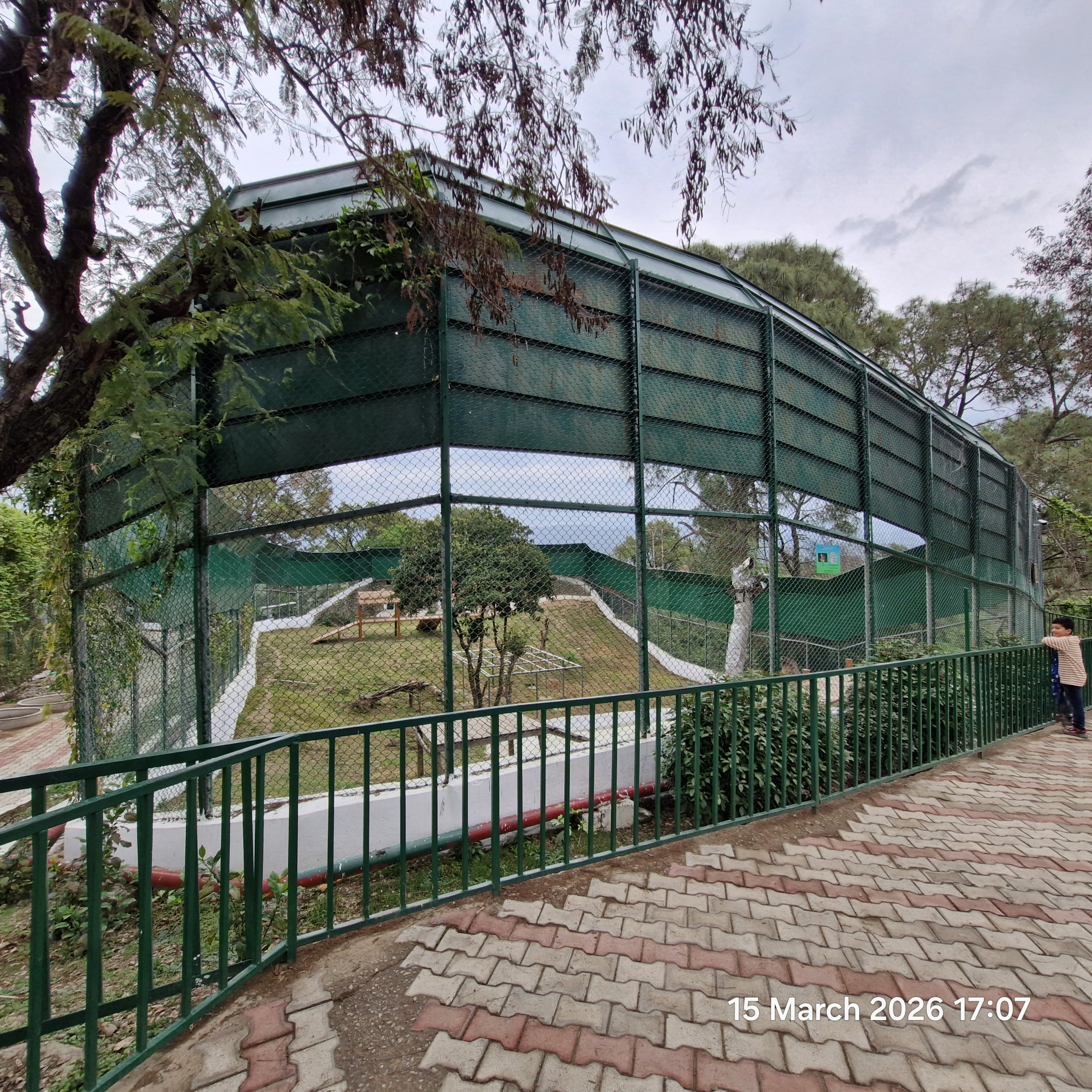
Leopard enclosure.

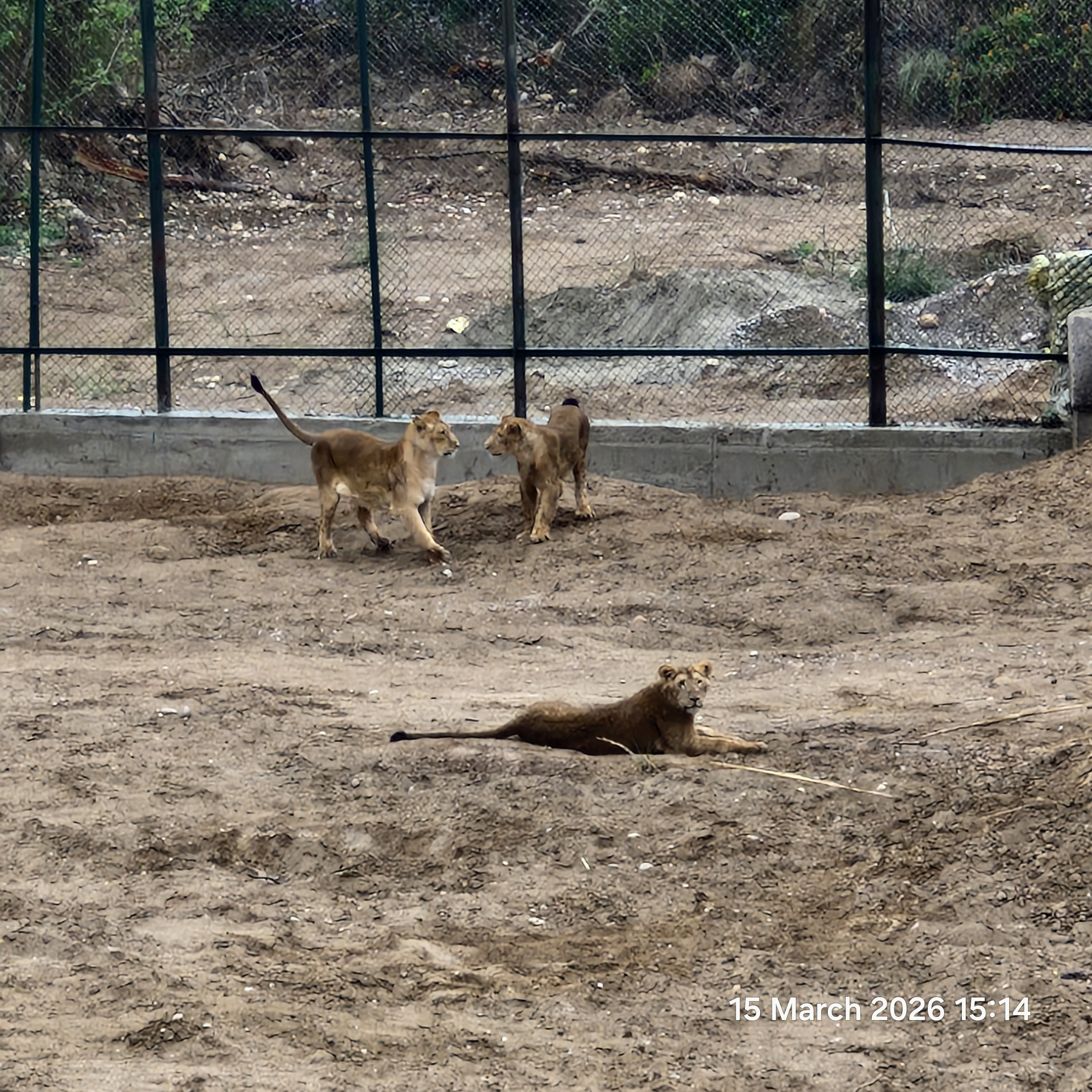
Lioness playing with her cubs.

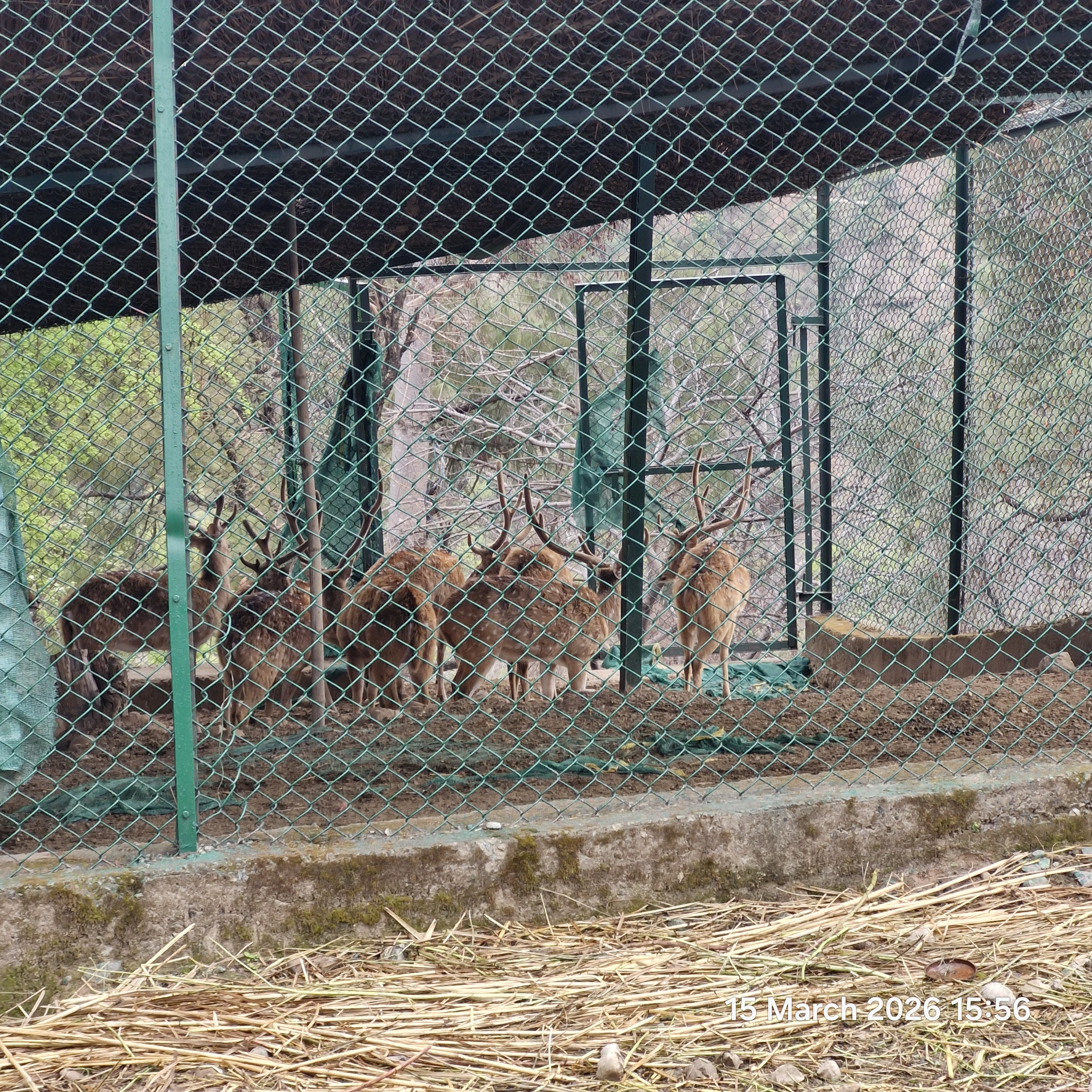
Chital.

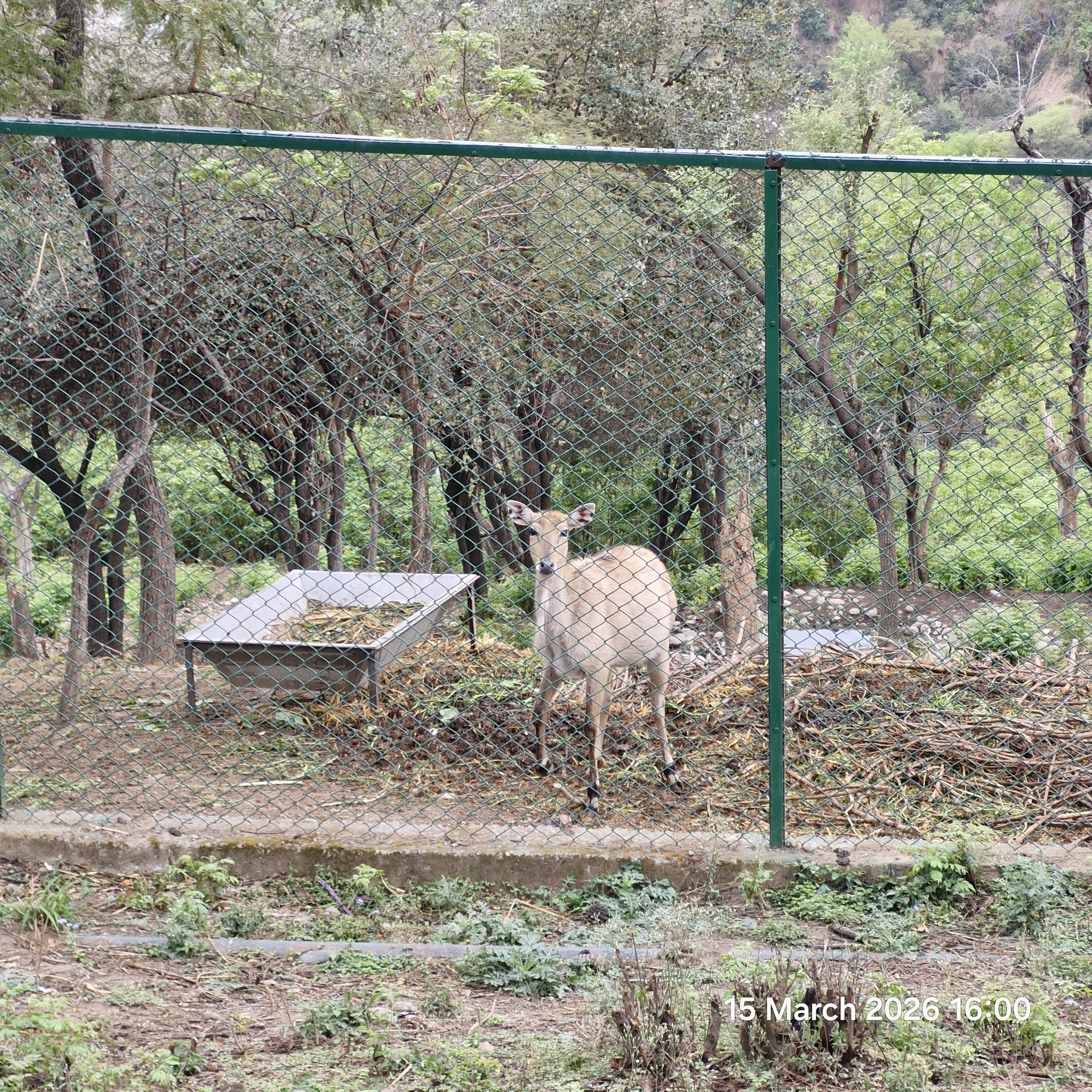
Nilgai.

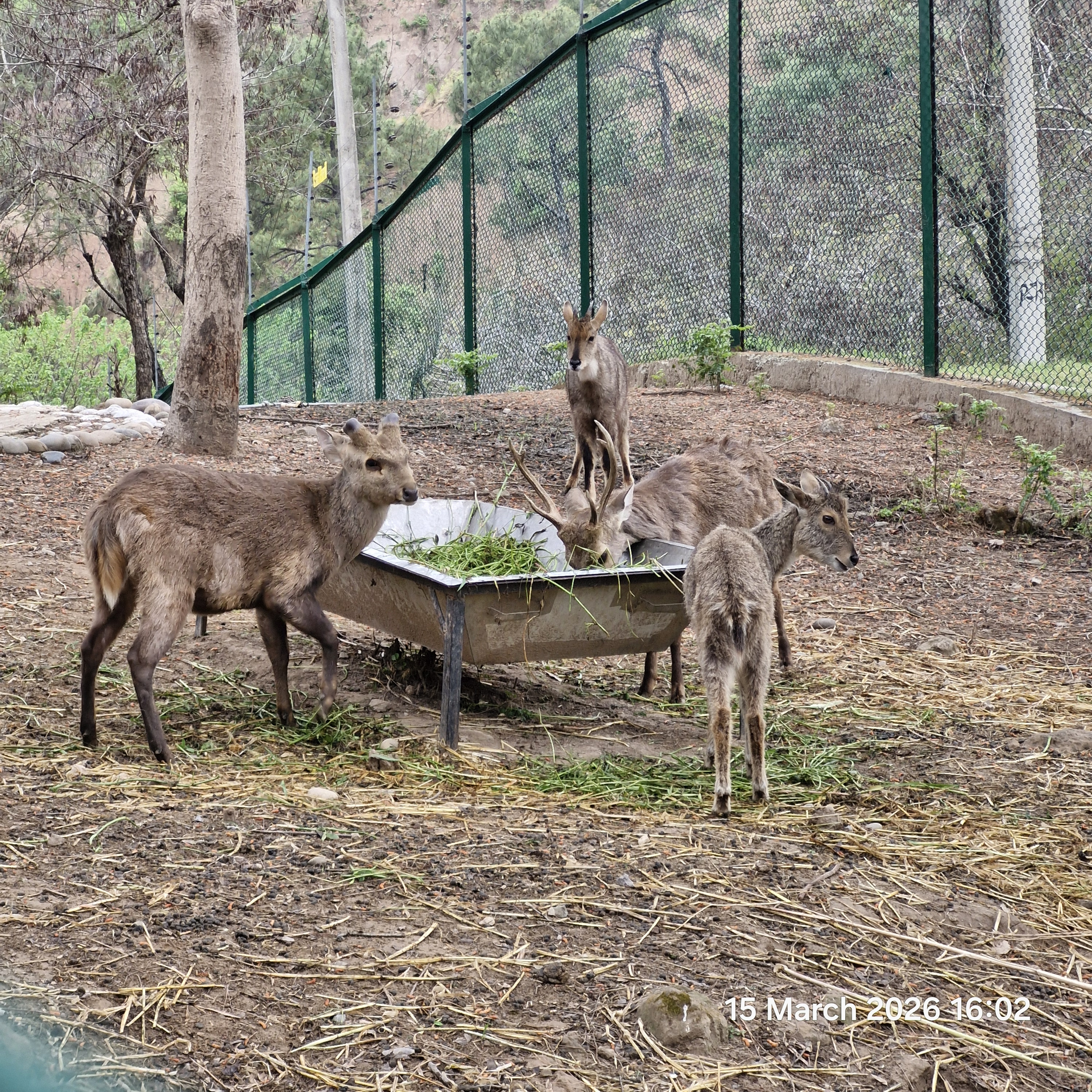
Hog Deers.

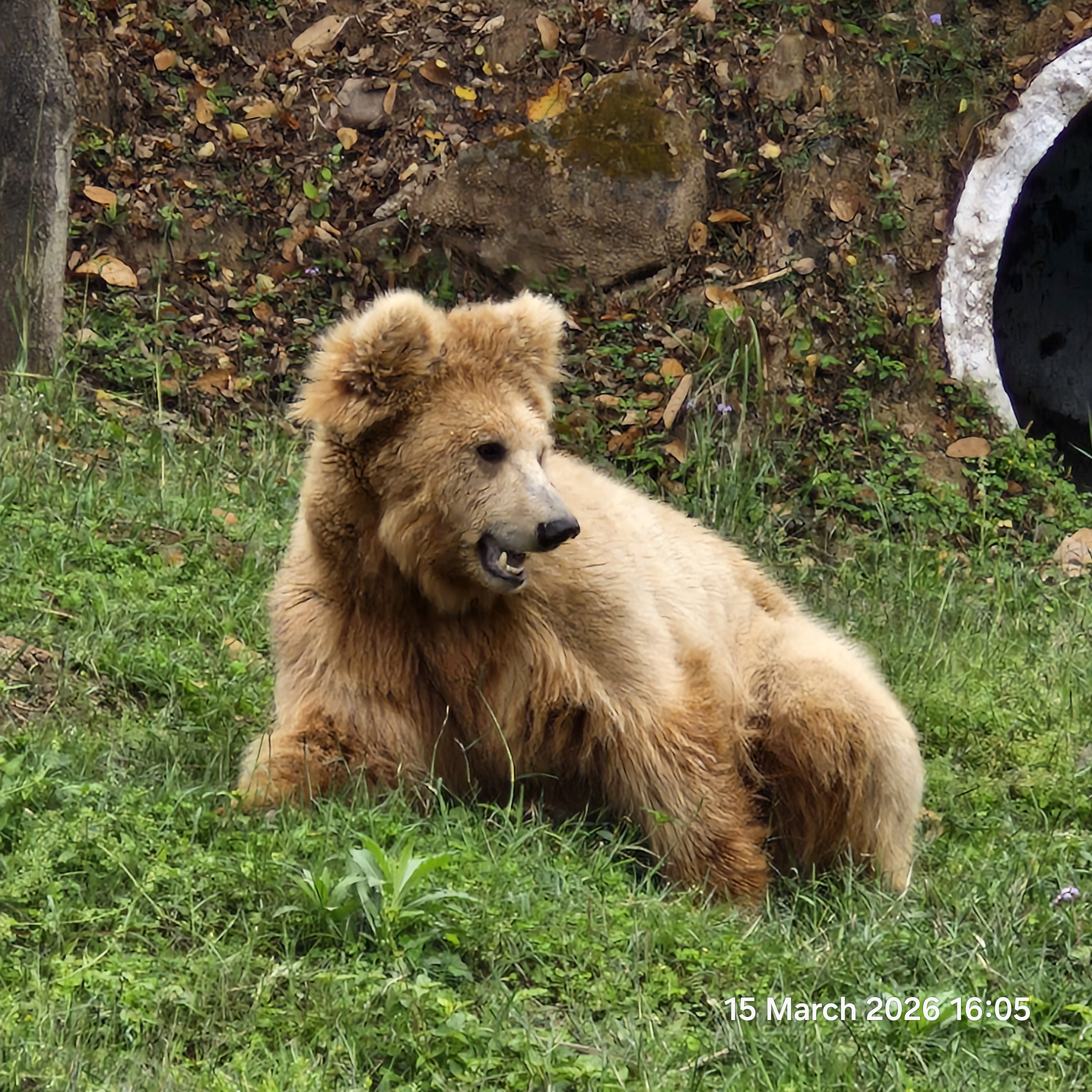
Himalayan Brown Bear.

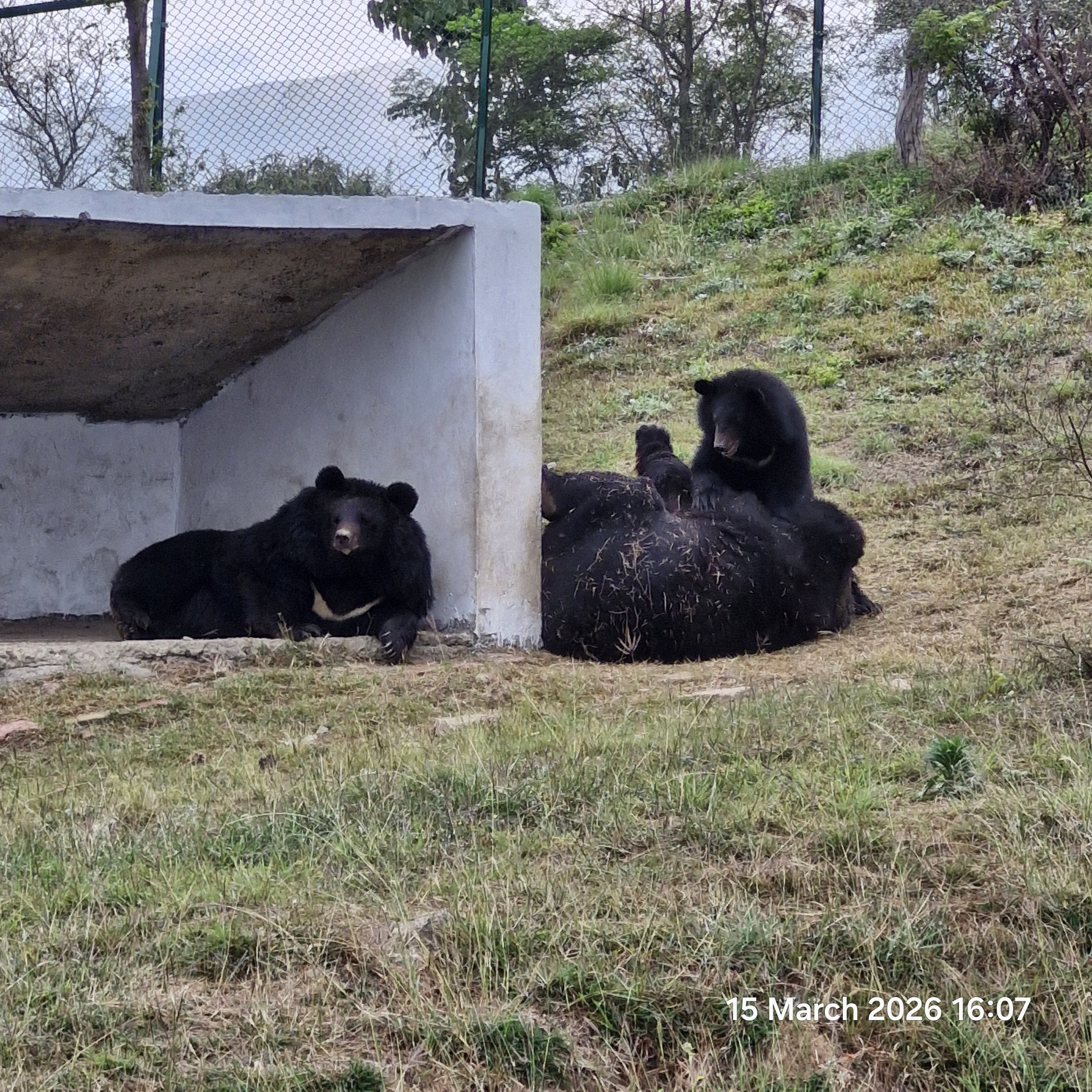
Himalayan Black Bears.

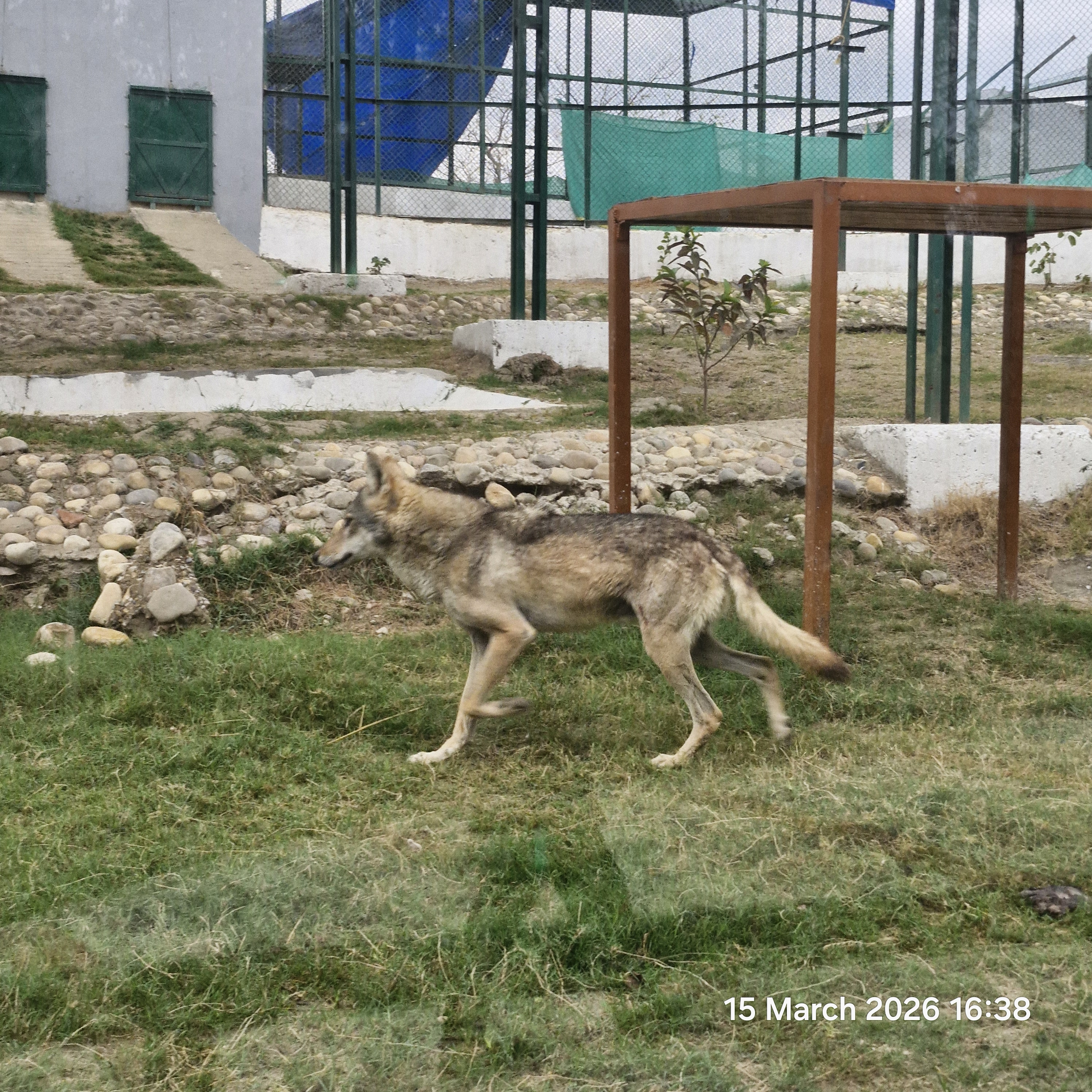
Indian Wolf.

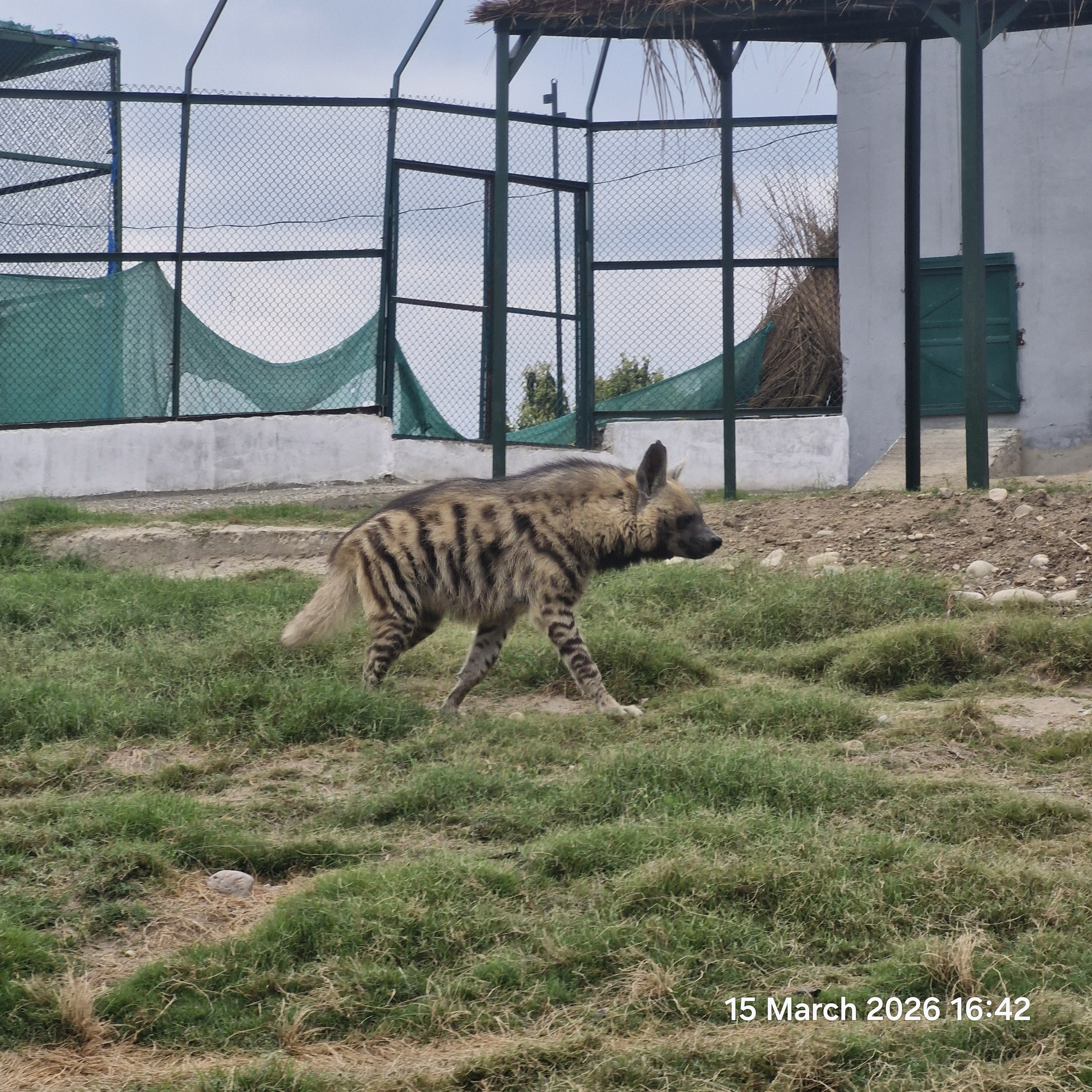
Striped Hyena.

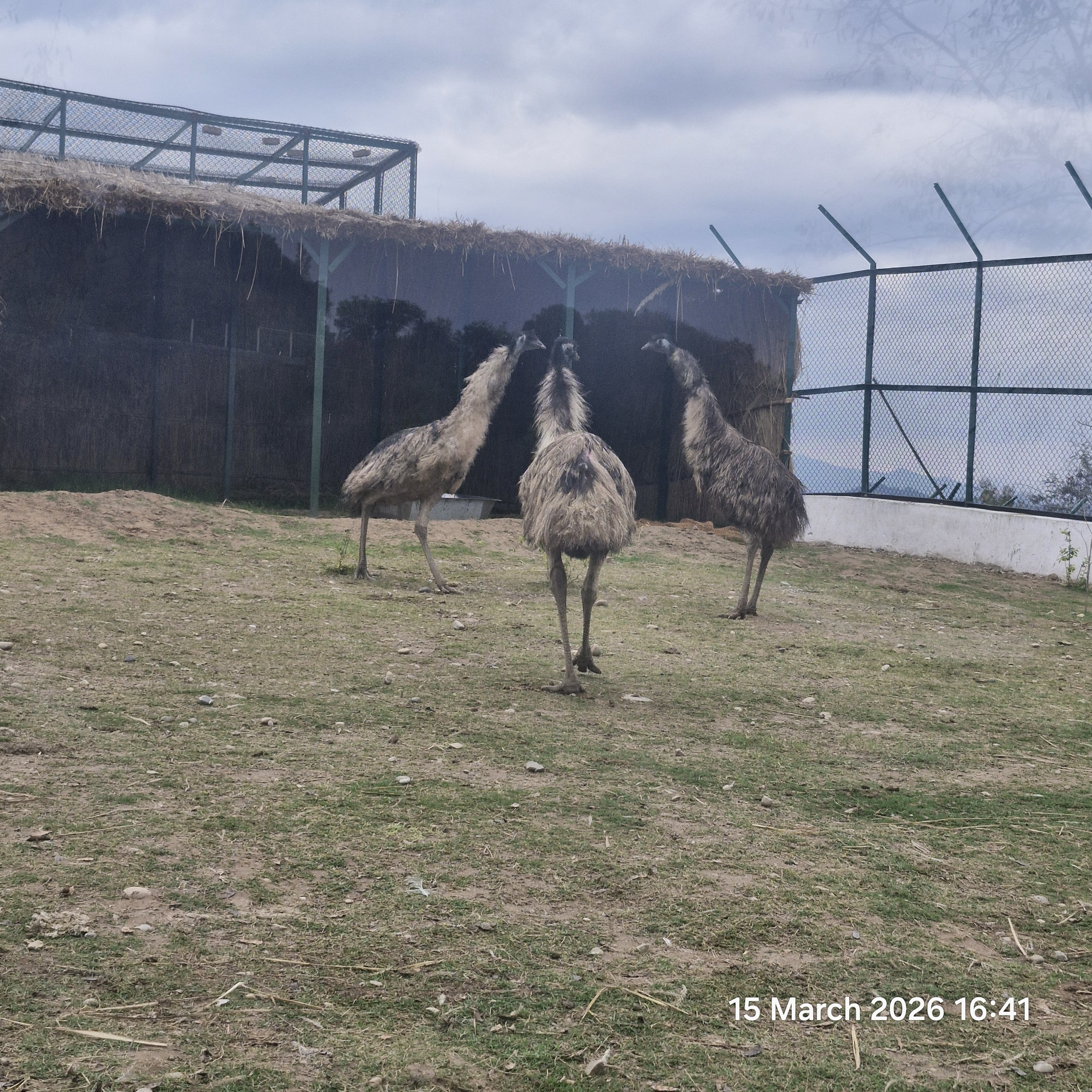
Emus.

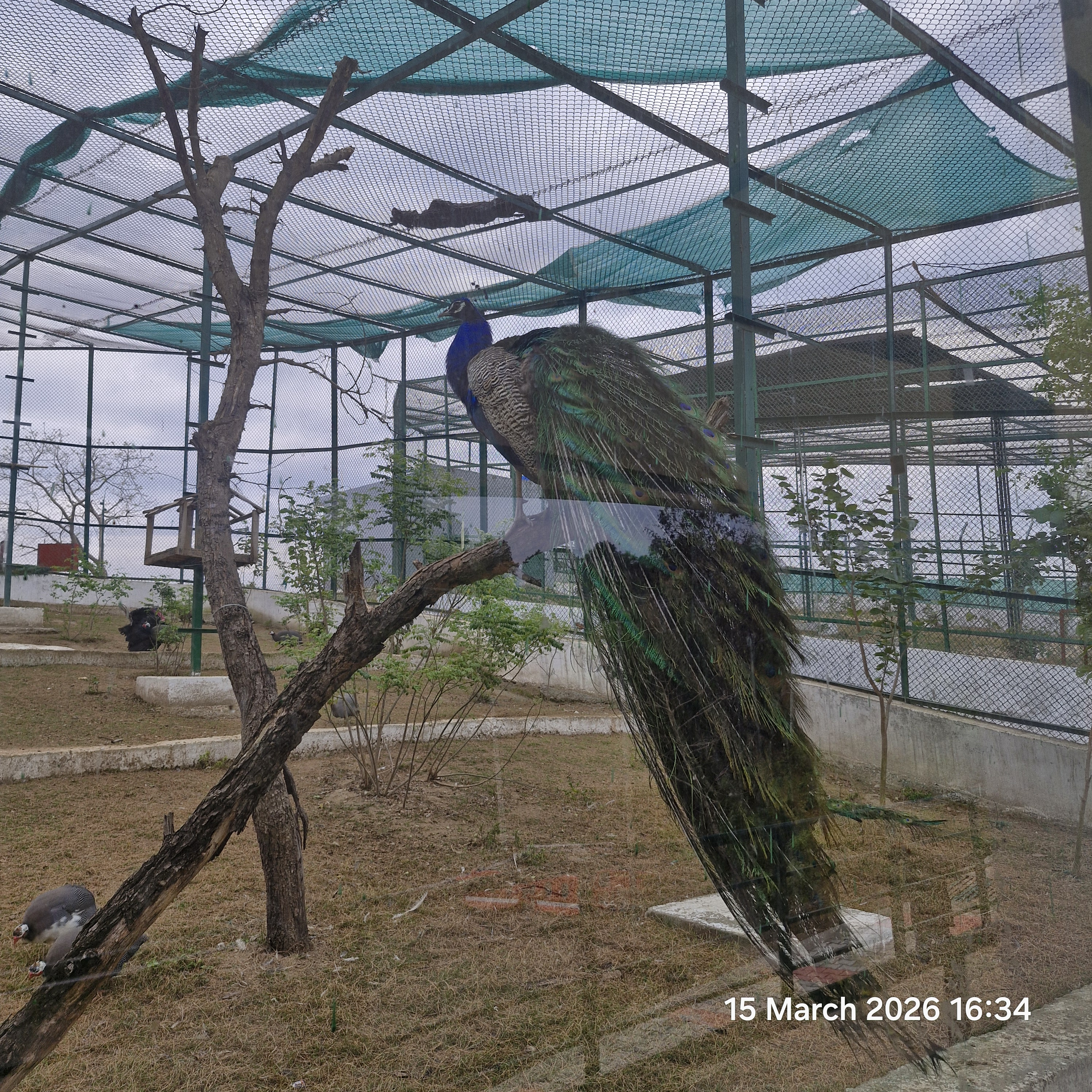
Indian Peacock.

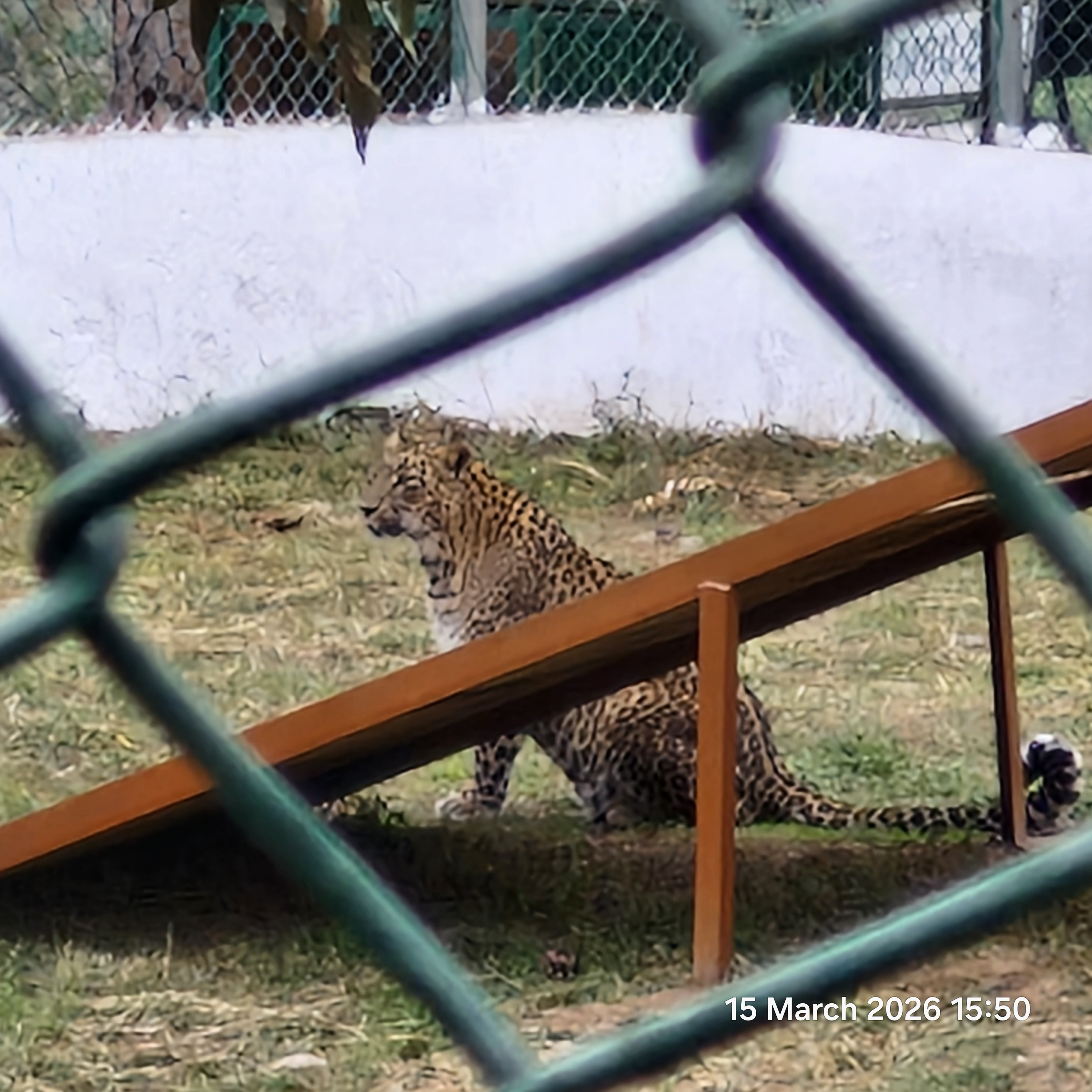
Female Leopard.
