= Pheasant Breeding Centre, Morni =

- Endangered wildlife breeding
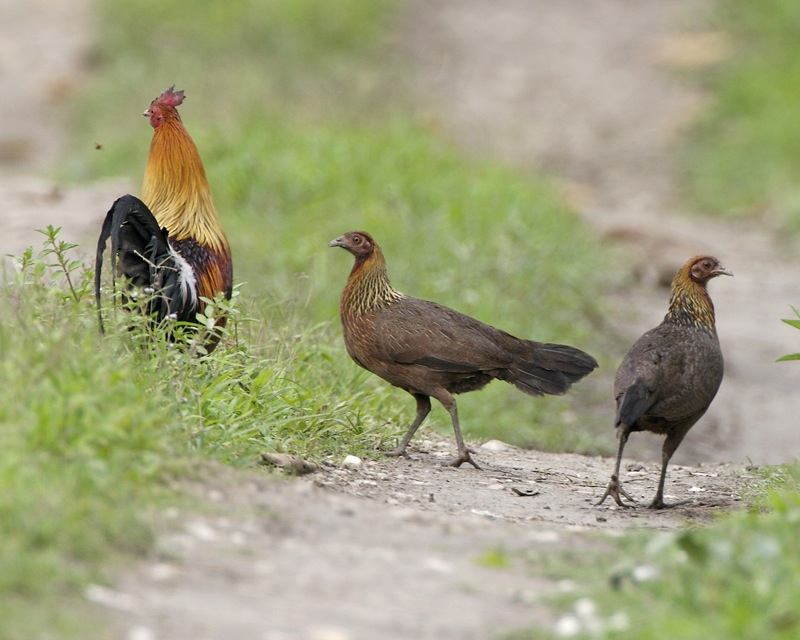

- Location in Haryana, India Pheasant Breeding Centre, Morni (India)
- Coordinates: 30°42′8″N 77°5′16″E
- Country: India
- State: Haryana
- District: Panchkula district
- Established: 1992

Government
  - Type: Government of Haryana
  - Body: Forests Department, Haryana
- Time zone: UTC+5:30 (IST)
- ISO 3166 code: IN-HR
- Website: haryanaforest.gov.in

The Pheasant Breeding Centre, Morni is a purpose-built centre for the breeding of pheasants situated in Panchkula district in Morni, a village and tourist attraction in the Morni Hills in the Panchkula district of the Indian state of Haryana. It is located around 45 kilometres (28 mi) from Chandigarh, 35 kilometres (22 mi) from Panchkula as its district and is known for its Himalayan views, flora, and lakes.

== History ==
- During the years 1992-93 to 1995-96 few eggs were collected from the wild and hatched at the centre.
- After 1996 most of the increase in the population of the birds came from breeding in the centre itself, using broody hens for brooding and hatching purposes.
- During the year 1998-99 fourteen birds born in the summer of 1998 were released in the forest area.
- In 1999 seven birds and in 2000 again 10 birds were released. Thus in all 31 sub-adult birds were released in the pre-selected proper habitat of the birds.

== Types of pheasants bred ==
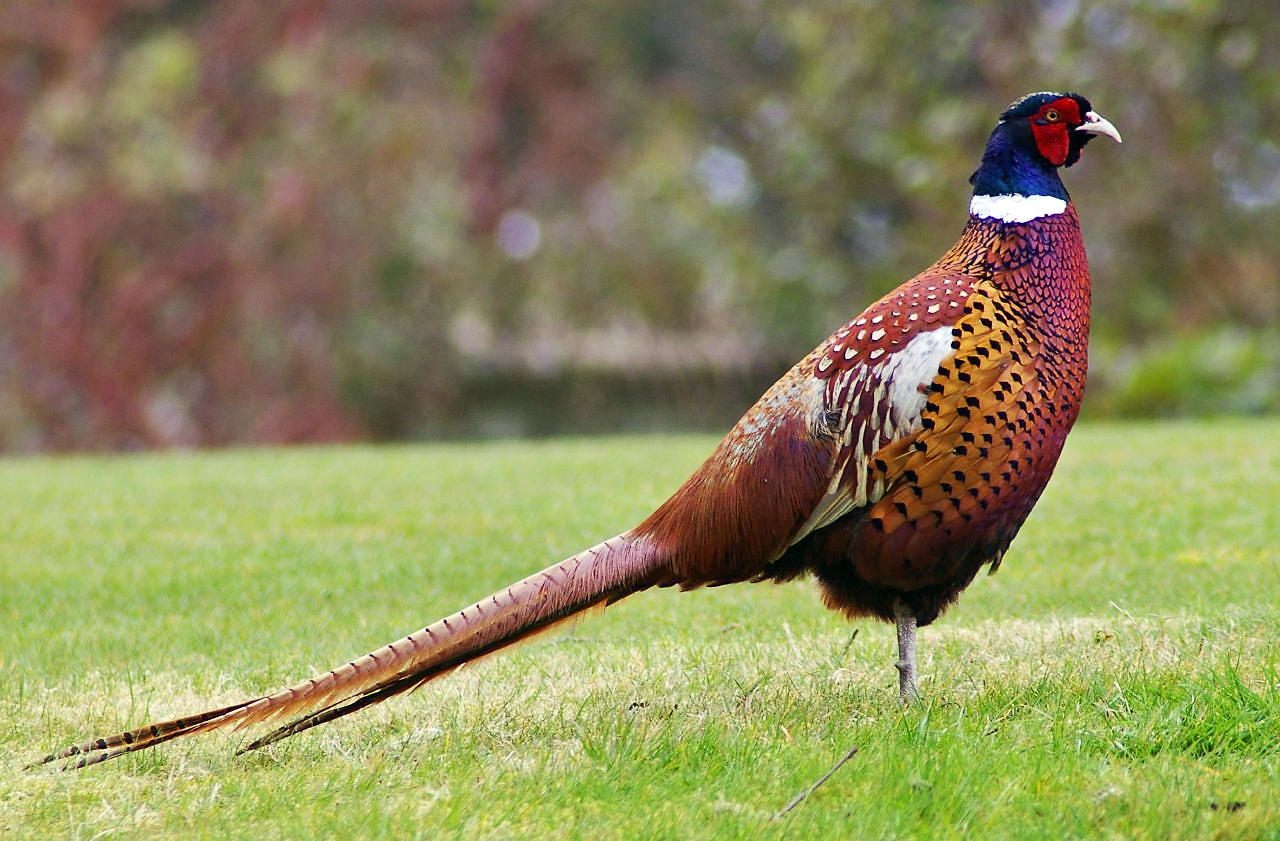
Red junglefowl (Gallus gallus)

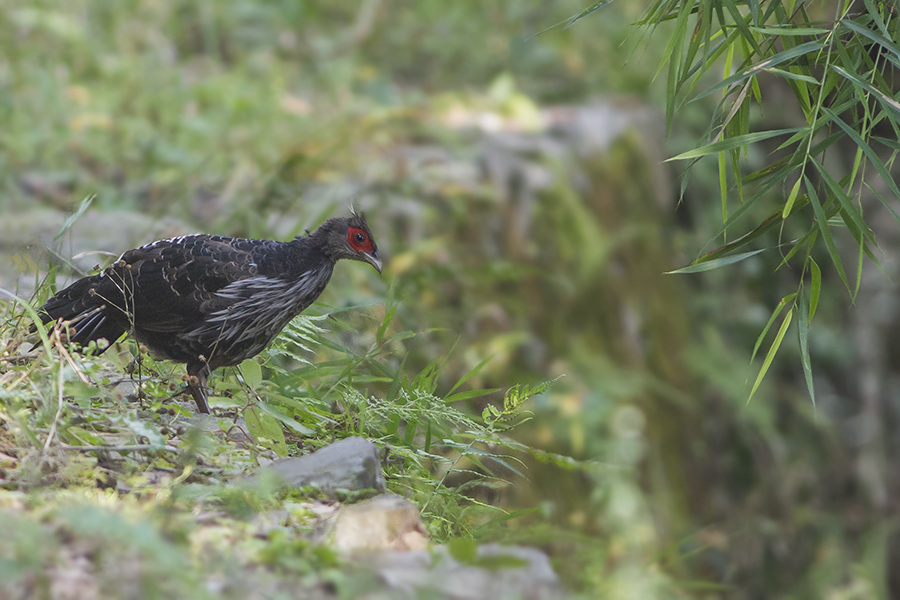
Kalij pheasant

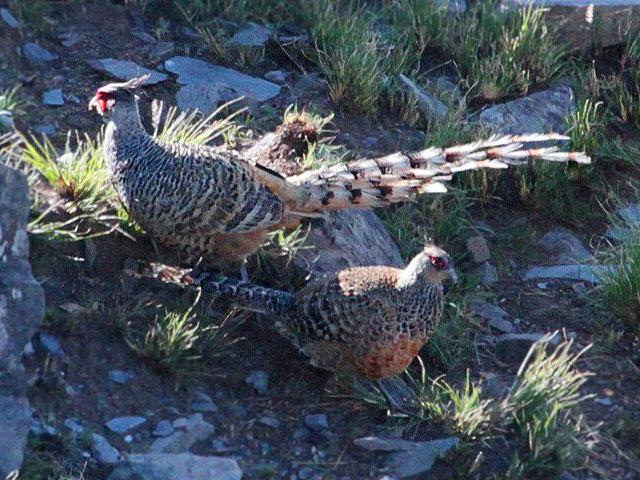
Cheer pheasant pair

Several types of pheasants are bred, including red junglefowl (Gallus gallus), endangered cheer pheasant (Catreus wallichii) and endangered kalij pheasant.

== See also ==
- Pheasant Breeding Centre, Berwala in Panchkula district
- Vulture Conservation and Breeding Centre, Pinjore
- Peacock & Chinkara Breeding Centre, Jhabua, in Rewari district
- List of zoos in India
- List of National Parks & Wildlife Sanctuaries of Haryana, India
- Haryana Tourism
- List of Monuments of National Importance in Haryana
- List of State Protected Monuments in Haryana
- List of Indus Valley Civilization sites in Haryana, Punjab, Rajasthan, Gujarat, India & Pakistan
