= Jaipur Zoo =

Zoo in Jaipur, Rajasthan

- Interactive map of Jaipur Zoo
- 26.9122356°N 75.8214355°E
- Date opened: 1877
- Location: Jaipur, Rajasthan, India
- Land area: 35 acres
- No. of animals: 550 approx
- No. of species: 50
- Memberships: CZA

Jaipur Zoo is in the city of Jaipur in Rajasthan state in India. The zoo was opened in 1877 and is located near to the Albert Hall Museum and Ram Nivas Garden. It is divided into two parts: one for mammals and another for birds and reptiles. Nearly 50 species of different birds and animals from all over the world can be seen here. In 1999, the ghariyal breeding farm was established which is fourth largest breeding farm in India. A museum was also constructed inside the zoo which exhibits the wildlife of Rajasthan. The Jaipur Zoo has been constituted under the Wild Life (Protection) Act. The main objective of the zoo is to complement the national effort in conservation of wild life. In 2018 it was announced that the zoo will be converted into a bird park with large aviaries. Large carnivores have already left the Jaipur zoo.

== Animal species exhibits ==
Jaipur Zoo houses total 550 animals approx. of 50 species which are:

=== Mammals section ===
carnivorous

- black panther(1)
- leopard(3)
- fox(11)
- jackal(3)
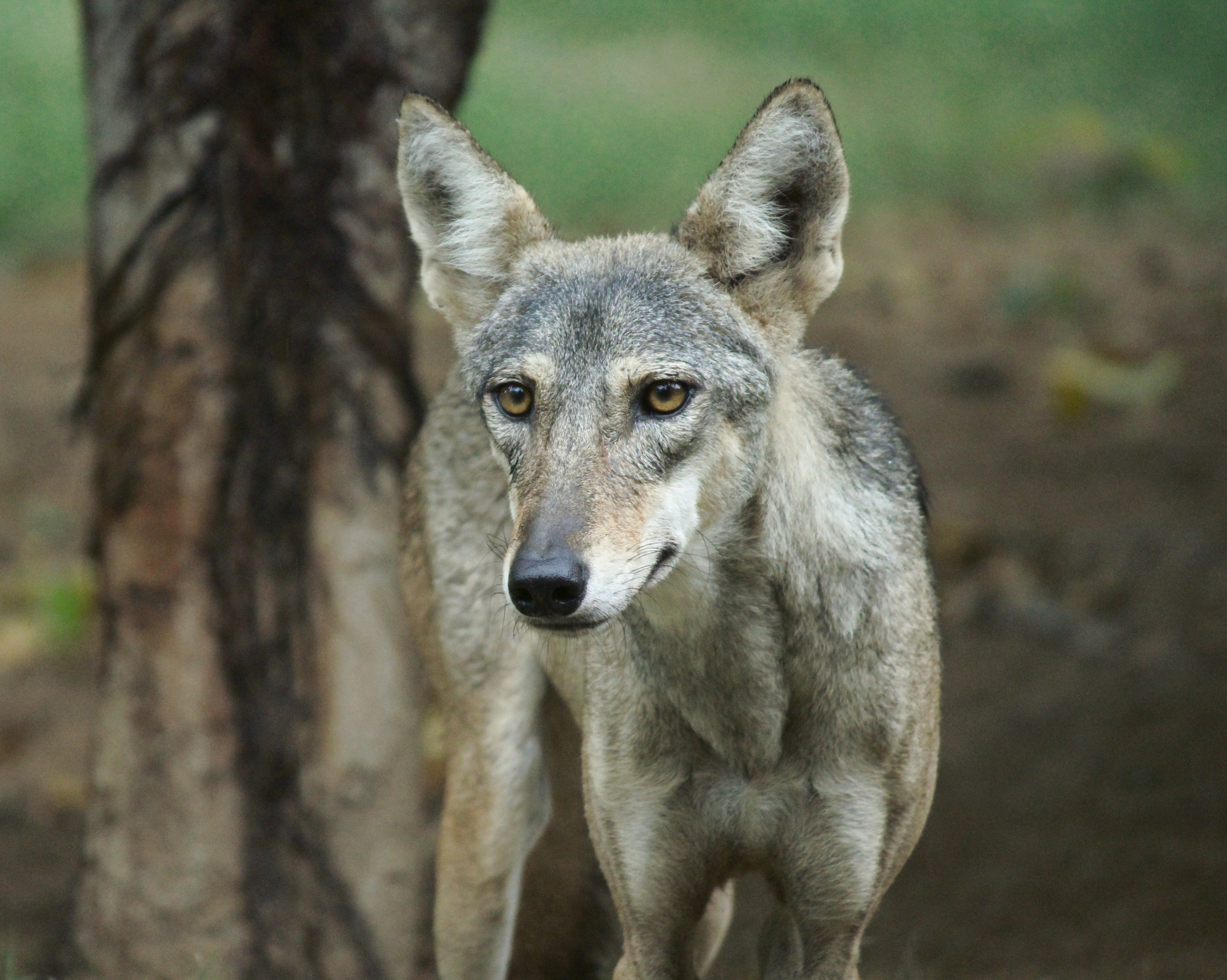
  Indian wolf in Jaipur zoo
- hyena(3)
- wolf(10)
- Indian civet(4)

omnivorous

- monkey(2)
- baboon(1)
- black bear(6)
- Himalayan bear(7)
- wild boar

herbivorous

- black buck(43)
- sambar deer(11)
- chital deer(84)
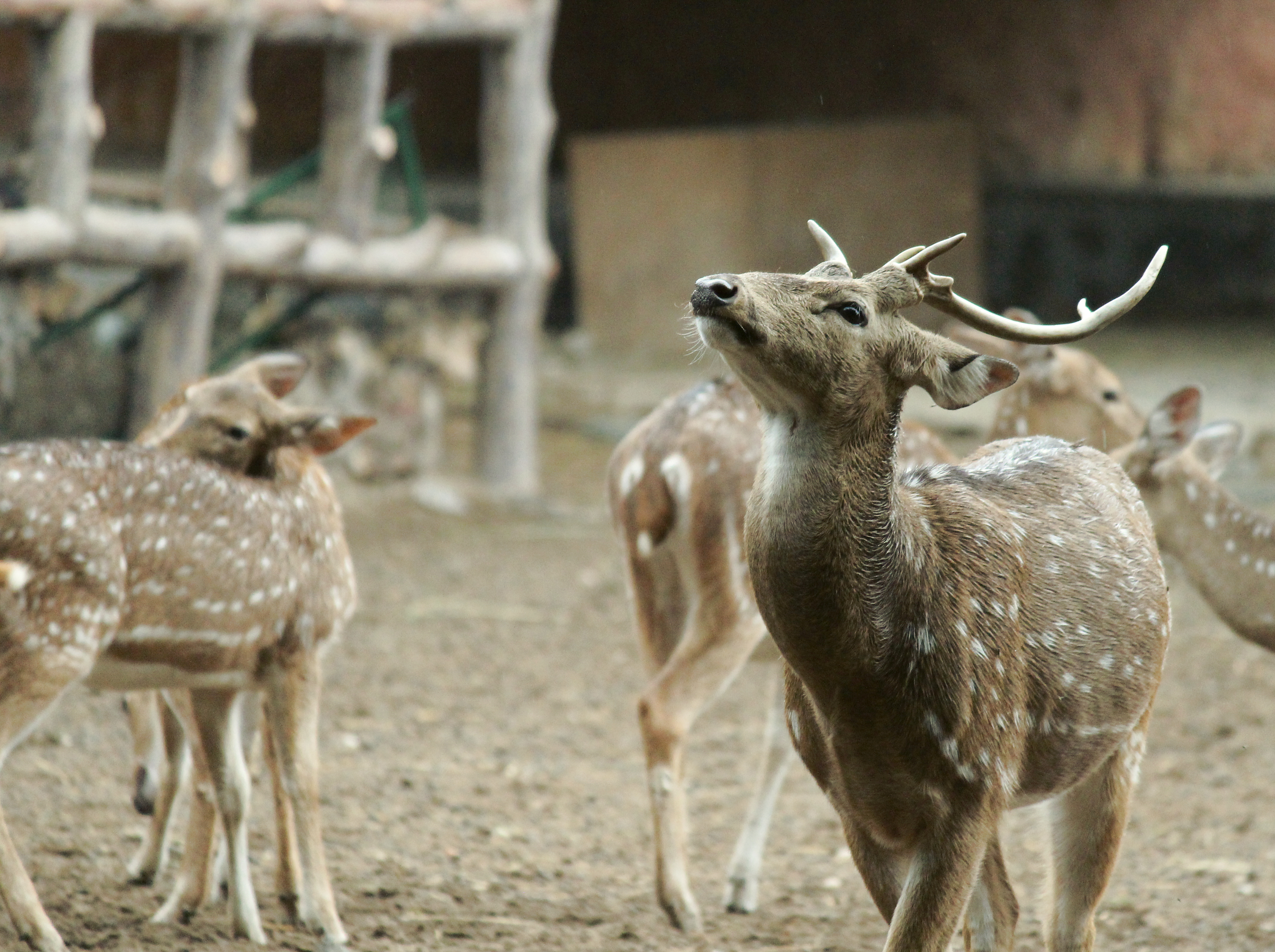
  Chital in Jaipur zoo
- chinkara(2)
- Hog deer(17)
- Barking deer(11)
- Indian porcupine(4)
- rabbit(6)

=== Birds section ===
- peacock(24)
- love bird(43)
- pelican (5)
- emu(18)
- owl(1)
- duck(60)
- parrot(35)
- white ibis(4)
- teetar(7)
- guinea hen(1)
- pink flamingo(5)
- vulture(1)
- crane(1)
- pheasant(7)
- cockatoo(1)
- painted stork(4)
- white stork(2)
- goose(5)
- budgerigar(64)

=== Reptile section ===
- Indian python(1)
- Eunectes notaeus(1)
- ghariyal(52)
- crocodile(11)
- turtle(23)
- tortoise(14)

== Conservation Breeding programs ==
The zoo is part of conservation breeding programs of the Central Zoo Authority and Government of Rajasthan for the ghariyal, cheetal and crocodile.

== Incidents ==
- In 2010, eleven spotted deer have died due to extreme cold conditions. The deer were suffering from suspected pneumonia and succumbed on 16 and 17 January.
- In October 2013, a rare white tiger, which was brought from Sri Venkateshwara Zoological Park, Andhra Pradesh, died at the zoo. This happened just 13 days after seven-year-old Madhav had refused food.

== See also ==
- Wildlife of Rajasthan
