= Sarnath Deer Park =

Sarnath Deer Park सारनाथ डियर पार्क
- Interactive map of Sarnath Deer Park सारनाथ डियर पार्क
- 25.3820367°N 83.0266202°E
- Date opened: 1956
- Location: Sarnath, Varanasi, Uttar Pradesh, India
- Land area: 33 acres
- No. of animals: 232 (2017)
- No. of species: 9
- Memberships: Central Zoo Authority (since 1999)

Deer Park (Hindi: डियर पार्क) is a mini zoo in Sarnath, Varanasi, Uttar Pradesh, India.

The Deer Park is also known as Sarnath Deer Park (Hindi: सारनाथ डियर पार्क).

This park was open many centuries ago (but reserved for the royal owners); it was officially established in 1956.
