= Marble Palace Zoo =

Zoo in Kolkata, India

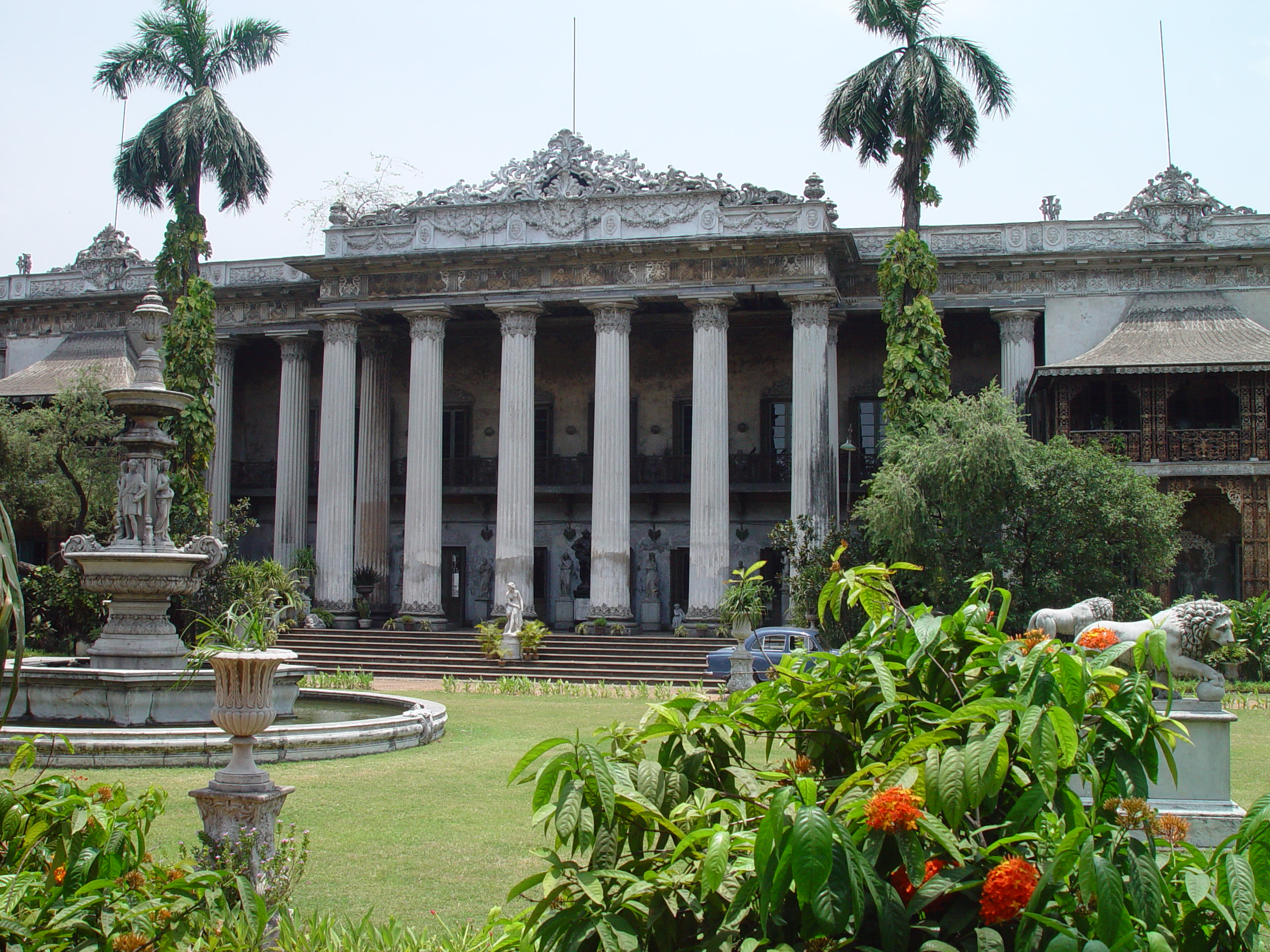
- Marble Palace
- Interactive map of Marble Palace Zoo
- 22.5820°N 88.3595°E
- Date opened: 1854
- Location: Kolkata, India
- Memberships: CZA

Marble Palace Zoo, which was the first zoo opened in India, also by Raja Rajendra Mullick. It now primarily serves as an aviary, including peacocks, toucans, storks, and cranes.

Located next to the zoo Marble Palace, located at 46, Muktaram Babu Street, Kolkata 700007, is a palatial mansion located in North Kolkata, India, which was built by Raja Rajendra Mullick in 1835 and contains many beautiful Western sculptures, pieces of Victorian furniture, and paintings by European and Indian artists. Large chandeliers, clocks, and busts of kings and queens decorate the hallways of the palace. It is famous for marble wall & floors, antiques, paintings by Rubens, curios, marble statues, floor to ceiling mirrors and for its collection of rare birds. Marble Palace is still lived in. Entrance is restricted and permission must be obtained from the government tourist office.

== History ==
The Marble Palace Zoo, locally known as Nilmani Niketan, were established by Raja Rajendra Mullick in 1835 as part of his Marble Palace estate at 46 Muktaram Babu Street, Kolkata. Mullick, a noted art collector and botanist, stocked the menagerie with herbivorous mammals and exotic birds in keeping with his vegetarian principles, opening it to the public as India's first private zoo. Over the 20th century the collection was gradually reduced, and today the zoo serves primarily as an aviary and small-animal garden adjacent to the palace museum.

== Structure and Specifications ==
The Marble Palace Zoo occupies a 0.12 ha precinct immediately west of the Marble Palace's main courtyard, enclosed by a 1.5 m‑high wrought‑iron fence on a dressed‑stone base. Five aviary pavilions (50–150 m² each) house birds such as hyacinth macaws, hornbills, and magpies, while two paddock enclosures host small mammals like porcupines, barking deer, and red-butt baboons. Terracotta‑tiled shade pavilions and visitor pathways are laid out to echo the palace's Neo‑Classical courtyard design, with seating areas and guided‑tour kiosks integrated into the landscape. The zoo operates under a "small zoo" classification by the Central Zoo Authority of India, with entry by permit through the West Bengal Tourism Information Bureau.
