= Kakatiya Zoological Park =

Kakatiya Zoo Park
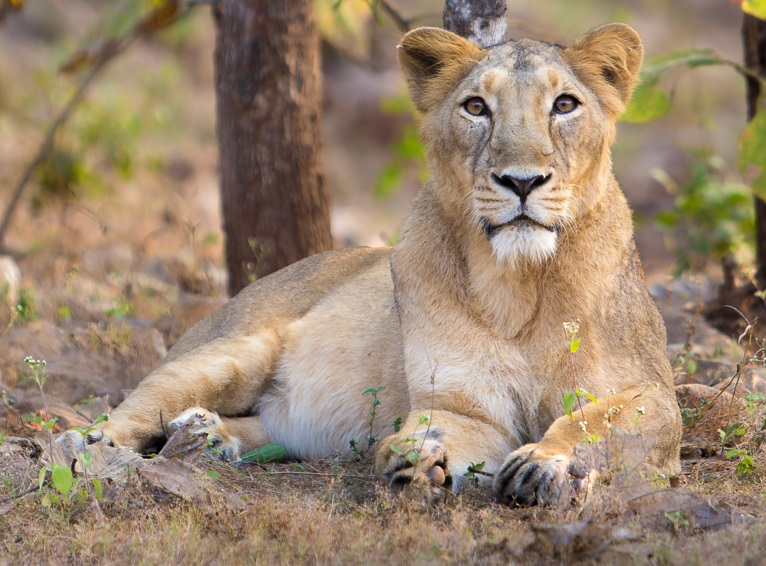
- Lion in Kakatiya Zoological Park
- Interactive map of Kakatiya Zoo Park
- 17°59′34″N 79°33′32″E
- Date opened: 1985
- Location: Hanamakonda, Hanamkonda, Telangana
- Land area: 47.5 acres
- No. of animals: 405
- No. of species: 41
- Memberships: CZA
- Website: kakatiyazoologicalpark.com

Kakatiya Zoological Park (also known as Warangal Vana Vignana Kendram or Warangal Zoo) is a zoo situated in Hanamakonda, Hanamkonda district of Telangana, India.

== History ==
Warangal District Administration has constructed the zoo to protect and preserve the sanctity of nature. It was opened for public in 1985. The zoo serves as both the educational and entertainment center.

The Central Zoo Authority of India has ordered to convert the zoo into a national zoological park in 2010, and was planned to do by 2013.

== Animals and exhibits ==
The zoo is located on a 50-acre area, and contains a variety of species of birds, animals and reptiles. A few of those include Bear, Leopard, deer, black bear, Ostrich, peacocks, cat jungle, tortoise, rheas, pigeons, golden jackal and crocodiles. Zoo also has a butterfly park.

== Transport ==
A very good transport facility is available to the zoo. Including TSRTC, many private services provide the means of transport. The nearest railway station is Kazipet Junction, which is 7 km away from the zoo.
