= M. L. Madan =

Indian biologist

- Born: 1939 (age 86–87)
- Citizenship: Indian
- Known for: First successful in vitro fertilisation of a buffalo in the world
- Awards: Padma Shri, Haryana Vigyan Ratna Award
- Scientific career
- Fields: Biotechnology, Veterinary science

Motilal Madan (born 1 January 1939) is an Indian biotechnology researcher, veterinarian, academic and administrator. In a career spanning over 35 years, Madan published 432 research articles and policy papers in international and national reference journals—including 226 original research papers—and pioneered research in reproductive endocrinology, embryo biotechnology, In vitro fertilisation, and cloning.

From 1987 to 1994, Madan served as Project Director of Embryo Transfer Technology at India's premier dairy research institute, the National Dairy Research Institute (NDRI). He led a research team at the institute that performed the first successful in vitro fertilisation of a buffalo in the world, leading to the birth of a calf, named "Pratham", in November 1990.

From 1994 to 1995, Madan served as the Director (Research) of the NDRI in Karnal and was later, from 1995 to 1999, the Deputy Director General (Animal Science) of the Indian Council of Agricultural Research. In November 2006 he became Vice-Chancellor of the Pandit Deen Dayal Upadhyaya Veterinary Science University, Mathura. Earlier he served as the Vice Chancellor of Dr. Panjabrao Deshmukh Krishi Vidyapeeth in Akola.

Madan was conferred the prestigious Padma Shri, the fourth highest civilian award in the Republic of India, by the Government of India in January 2022 for distinguished service in the fields of science and engineering. While congratulating him, Haryana Chief Minister Manohar Lal Khattar commented that "Madan's accomplishments have brought pride to the country."

== Early years and education ==
Madan was born into a Kashmiri Pandit family in Srinagar on 1 January 1939. He received his BVSc (Veterinary Medicine) degree from Punjab College of Veterinary Science & Animal Husbandry in 1959 with a gold medal, after which he obtained his MVSc degree from the National Dairy Research Institute, Karnal with a gold medal in 1965. He then obtained his doctoral (PhD) degree from the University of Missouri, in 1971.
