= Gorewada Zoo =

Zoo in Maharashtra, India

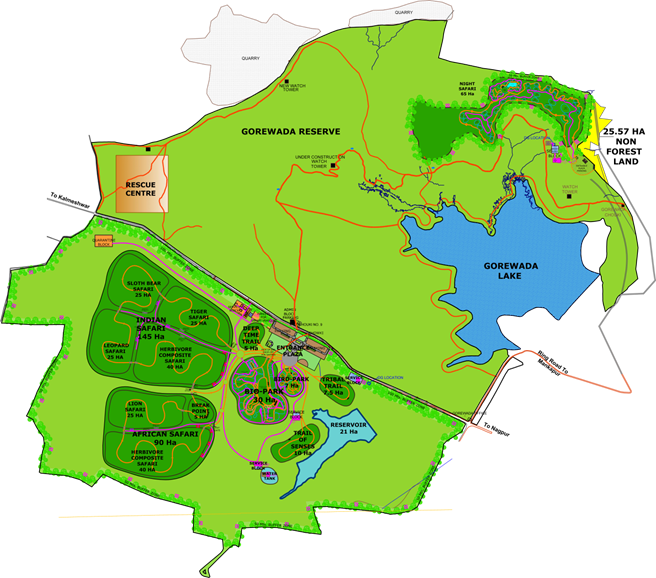
Gorewada Zoo Safari

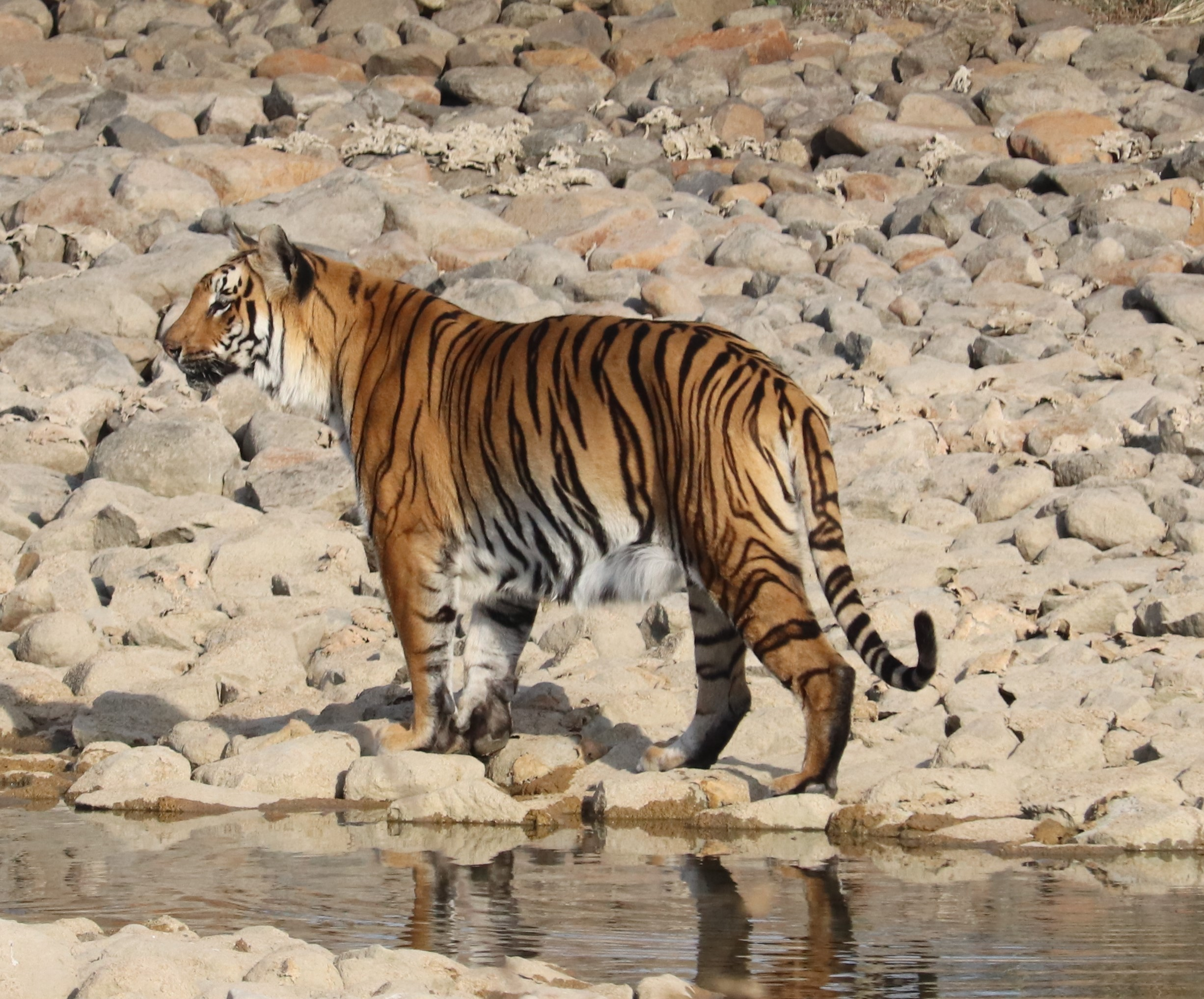
Tiger in Wild Gorewada Zoo Nagpur

Balasaheb Thackeray Gorewada International Zoological Park, known earlier as the Gorewada Zoo, is a zoo in the Nagpur district of the Indian state of Maharashtra. Upon completion, this is likely to be one of the largest captive zoo safaris in India, covering over 1914 hectares of land adjoining Gorewada Lake. It is considered in the top sights in Nagpur.

== History ==
In 2006, the Government of Maharashtra identified approximately 1,914 hectares of forest suitable for establishing the project, adjacent to Gorewada Lake and 8 km (5.0 mi) from the city of Nagpur. The project was entrusted to the Forest Development Corporation of Maharashtra. To make the zoo financially viable, the state government transferred an additional 26 hectares of non-forest land for commercial utilization.

The zoo was inaugurated by the erstwhile Chief Minister of Maharashtra, Uddhav Thackeray, on 26 January 2021. The project was renamed from the Gorewada Zoo to the Balasaheb Thackeray Gorewada International Zoological Park.
