= Nandan Van Zoo =

- Interactive map of Nandan Van Zoo
- 21.282°N 81.544°E
- Date opened: 1979
- Location: Raipur, Chhattisgarh, India
- Land area: 800 acres
- Major exhibits: Herbivore Safari, Bear Safari, Tiger Safari, Lion Safari

Nandan Van Zoo or Nandan van Jungle Safari is a tourist destination located at Raipur, Chhattisgarh, India. It is located on the banks of the Kharun River. It is spread into 800 acres.

== History and description ==
Nandan Van Safari was established in 1979. It began as a rescue shelter for distressed animals and evolved into a tourist and wildlife destination. In 2016, PM Modi inaugurated the Safari in Naya Raipur and made it open to the public.

Located on the banks of the Kharun River, the zoo and safari are spread across 800 acres, and collectively house over 76 animals, including several key species native to India. Some of the important animals are bear, tiger, lion, deer, wild buffalo and blackbuck. It also contains a 130 acre of water body named ‘Khandwa Reservoir’.

The Nandan Van Zoo has faced multiple controversies since 2023. In November 2023, 17 of 24 four-horned antelopes died from undetermined causes that prompted investigations by state and central wildlife authorities. In May 2025, wildlife activist Nitin Singhvi alleged that four ailing leopards and a three-legged hyena had been kept for eight years in small cement-floored enclosures at the Zoo and this raised concerns about their welfare. In February 2025, one of two Himalayan bears transported from Nagaland Zoo to the facility went missing en route and the forest department, leading Singhvi to accuse the wildlife department of negligence and to call for greater transparency regarding animal deaths.

== See also ==
- List of zoos in India
- Wildlife of India
