= Dr. Panjabrao Deshmukh Krishi Vidyapeeth =

Agricultural university in Maharashtra, India

Coordinates: 20°42′51.2″N 77°3′2.21″E

- Type: Public
- Established: 1969 (57 years ago)
- Chancellor: Governor of Maharashtra
- Vice-Chancellor: Dr. Sharad R. Gadakh
- Location: P.O. Krishi Nagar, Akola, Maharashtra 444104, Akola, Maharashtra, India
- Website: www.pdkv.ac.in

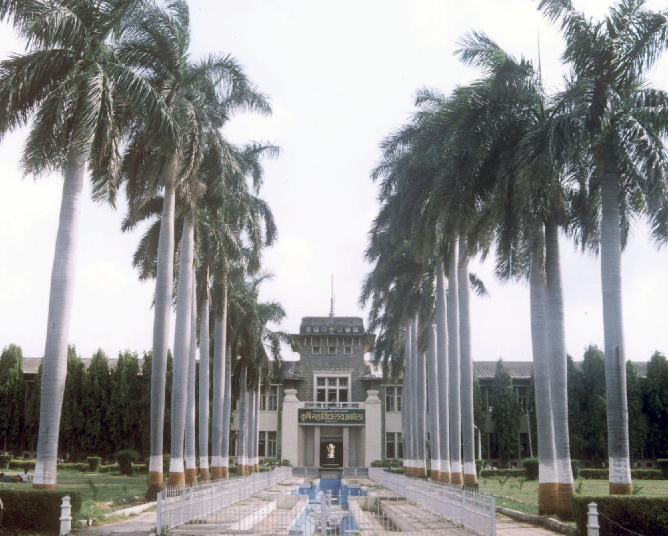
Dr. Panjabrao Deshmukh Krishi Vidyapeeth at Akola, Maharashtra (PDKV) - Agricultural University

Dr. Panjabrao Deshmukh Krishi Vidyapeeth (PDKV or PKV) is an agricultural university located at Akola, in Maharashtra, India, in the Vidarbha region. The university is responsible for agricultural education, research and extension education along with breeder and foundation seed programmes. Its jurisdiction includes all eleven districts of Vidarbha namely Akola, Amravati, Bhandara, Buldhana, Chandrapur, Gadchiroli, Gondia, Nagpur, Washim, Wardha and Yavatmal. The Central Campus is at Akola while another major campus is at Nagpur and a new campus has been established at Gadchiroli.

== History ==
In the mid-1960s, Maharashtra government decided to establish agricultural universities. One such location was at Akola in Vidarbha, where there was already a functioning agriculture college since 1905. However, leaders from Western Maharashtra prevailed on the Maharashtra government to shift it Rahuri in Western Maharashtra. As a result, Government of Maharashtra shifted the State Agril. University to Rahuri in Western Maharashtra by end of 1966.

This led to an unprecedented student protest in Akola, and provoked an angry response from citizens of Vidarbha, who viewed it as one more act of discrimination against them. It may be remembered that on 1 November 1956, a part of Madhya Pradesh consisting of eight districts of Vidarbha had been merged against the local people's wishes and the recommendations of the States Reorganisation Commission into the erstwhile State of Bombay, which was later transformed in the State of Maharashtra on 1 May 1960. The people of Vidarbha resented this merger, and saw the shifting of the Agriculture University from Akola to Rahuri as an act of deliberate discrimination and favouritism.

On 17 August 1967 in Akola, thousands of people demonstrated against this government's decision finally resulting in of the massive violent agitation of the Students in which 9 students were shot dead by the police.

The agitation ended after the government of Maharashtra relented not to shift the Agricultural University to Rahuri. The agitation also marked the beginning of Jambuvantrao Dhote's period in Vidarbha's statehood struggle.

Finally the Agricultural University at Akola was started on 20 October 1969. It was named after the illustrious son of Vidarbha Dr. Panjabrao (alias Bhausaheb) Deshmukh, who was the Minister for Agriculture, Government of India, as Panjabrao Krishi Vidyapeeth. It was renamed as Dr. Panjabrao Deshmukh Krishi Vidyapeeth from 15 November 1995.

College of Agriculture, Nagpur located in heartland of the city is one of the 5 oldest Agriculture colleges that started in 1905.

== Research ==
The university has over a total 3425 hectares of cultivable land under its possession for conducting various research, field trials in addition to seed multiplication programme. This university covers the need of a wide range of climatic zones varying from Wet Humid Rice zone of East gradually ending with Arid Cotton and Millet Zone of west. Similarly its northern districts form southern limit for wheat cultivation in India. In the past this university has made significant contribution to research work especially in cotton (PKV-2 cotton hybrid), sorghum (kharif hybrids), pulses (TAU- series of Black gram), oilseed (TAG-24 Groundnut variety; few linseed varieties), watershed management, dryland management, and Mandarin orange cultivation.

- 20 research stations
- 24 all India co-ordinated projects
- 16 ad-hoc schemes under operation
- 28 non-plan and 2 plan research projects
- Biotechnology Centre
- Nagarjuna Medicinal and Aromatic Plant Park
- Biodiversity Park
- Maharajbagh Zoo

Agricultural research stations

- Central Research Station: Akola
- Central Trial Campus, Vani Rambhapur, Akola
- National Agril Res. Project, Yavatmal
- National Agril Res. Project, Sindewahi, Chandrapur district; Paddy Research Station
- Kharif Cereal and Pulse Research and Training Project: Mhali, Amgaon Gondia district
- Regional Research Centre, Amravati
- Agri. Research Station, Sonapur Gadchiroli district
- Agri. Research Station, Washim
- Agri. Research Station, Achalpur Amravati district
- Agri. Research Station, Buldhana
- Agri. College Campus, Nagpur
- Regional Fruit Research Station Katol Nagpur district
- Agri. Research Station, Tharsa Nagpur district
- Agri. Research Station, Sakoli
- Agril Research Station, NavegaonBan Bhandara district
- Agril Research Station, Patur Road, Akola
- Betelwine Research Station, Ramtek
- Agril Research Station, Kutki, Hinganghat, Wardha district
- Agril Research Station, Ekarjuna Chandrapur district
- Betelwine Research Station: Akot Akola district

== Academics ==
PDKV grants bachelor's, master's and doctoral degrees in Agricultural Sciences and Agricultural Engineering & Technology. Admission to all the degree, postgraduate and doctorate degree programmes are made through MCAER, Pune.

- B.Sc (Hons.) Agriculture,
- B.Sc (Hons.) Horticulture,
- B.Sc (Hons.) Forestry,
- B.Sc (Hons.) Agribusiness Management,
- B.Sc (Hons.) Home Science,
- B.Sc (Hons.) Agricultural Biotechnology,
- B.Tech Agricultural Engineering,
- B.Tech Food Technology,

_____________________________________

- M.Sc. Agriculture,
- M.Sc. Horticulture,
- M.Sc. Forestry,
- M.Sc. Molecular biology and Biotechnology,
- M.Tech Agricultural Engineering,
- M.B.A. Agribusiness Management,

____________________________________

New College of Agriculture has been opened at Gadchiroli, a tribal district. There are also five agriculture schools for lower education located at Buldhana, Hiwara, Mul-Maroda, Nimbi, Sawangi and Warud.

Recently under the grant of Dr. Panjabrao Deshmukh Krushi Vidhyapeeth running new college Vasantrao Naik College of Agriculture and Biotechnology, at Yavatmal.

== Departments ==
Dr. Panjabrao Deshmukh Agriculture University has several departments.

- Agronomy
- Entomology
- Botany (Genetics and plant Breeding, Crops Physiology, Seeds Technology, Agriculture Biotechnology)
- Soil science
- Agriculture Economics and statistic
- Extension Education
- Agricultural engineering
- Animal husbandry and Dairy science
- Plant pathology

== Student welfare ==
The director of student welfare looks after the following activities for the welfare of students.

- To promote and develop various sports, game and co-curricular activities amongst students at the university level
- To promote the sportsman spirit and to organize inter College tournament within the jurisdiction of the university.
- To conduct inter university tournaments behalf of the inter University Sports Board, New Delhi/Inter Agriculture University Sports Board /Inter State University Tournament (Ashwamegh).
- To organize campus interviews of the different firms, industries, seed and pesticides companies, banks, etc. for the placement of students.

The university has established the Dr. Panjabrao Deshmukh Competitive Forum (Dr. PDCF) to extend the facilities to the students for guidance and preparation of different competitive examination.

== Extension education ==
Imparting of extension education is one of the mandatory functions of the university. The university has 11 Krishi Vigyan Kendras (KVK), which undertake training and demonstrations for the benefit of farmers. It also has a Training and Visit Scheme (T&V) at Nagpur, Sindewahi and Yavatmal.

The Directorate of Extension Education of the university has been recognized by the Ministry of Agriculture, Govt. of India, as the Center of Excellence for imparting training on Dryland Agriculture Technology.

Institution Village Linkage Program (IVLP): The pilot project on technology assessment and refinement through IVLP sponsored by Indian Council of Agricultural Research, New Delhi is being implemented by the university in the village Gorwha, Taluka Barshitakli, Akola district, since 1995.

== Vice Chancellor ==
Dr.S. R. Gadakh (a distinguished agronomist) has been appointed as the Vice Chancellor (VC) of this university in September 2022 for a term of five years.

Former Vice Chancellors, in chronological order, are as given below:

1. Late L.N. Bongirwar (1-7-1969 to 9-10-1972), the first Vice Chancellor
2. Late N. Gopalkrishna (10-10-1972 to 1-6-1978) specialization in Horticulture; Previously Horticulturist to the Government of Bombay
3. D.N. Kapoor (2-6-1978 to 2-7-1978)additional charge
4. Late B.A. Chougule (3-7-1978 to 15-4-1981); specialization in the field of Agricultural Chemistry
5. S.P. Upasani (16-4-1981 to 10-6-1981) additional charge
6. V.S. Gopalkrishna (11-6-1981 to 13-8-1981)additional charge
7. S. Rama Krishna (14-8-1981 to 12-2-1982)additional charge
8. K.R. Thakare (13-2-1981 to 15-12-1985); specialization in Entomology
9. V.T. Rahate (16-12-1985 to 15-6-1986) additional charge
10. Late H.B. Ulemale (16-6–1986 to 30-4-1990); specialization in Agricultural Economics
11. Late P.W. Amin (1-5-1990 to 30-4–1993) (expired 2006); specialization in Entomology. Earlier worked at ICRISAT.
12. B.G. Bhatkal (1-5-1993 to 30-4–1996); specialization in the field of Agronomy
13. G.M. Bharad (1-5-1996 to 16-5–1999); specialization in the field of Watershed Management
14. M. L. Madan (17-5-1999 to 16-5–2002); specialization in the field of Animal Husbandry
15. S.A. Nimbalkar (17-5-2002 to 3-7–2007); specialization in the field of Entomology
16. V.M. Mayande (4-7-2007 to 3-7-2012); specialization in the field of Agril. Engineering
17. R.G. Dani (14-08-2012 to 29-07-2017); specialization in the field of Genetics
18. Vilas Bhale (23-09-2017 to 08-09-2022); specialization in the field of Agronomy
19. Dileep Malkhede (09-09-2022 to 15-09-2022); Additional Charge, Vice Chancellor of Sant Gadge Baba Amravati University, Amravati
20. Shrad Gadakh (16-09-2022 to Present)

== Controversies ==
Dadaji Ramaji Khobragade accused the state-run Punjabrao Krishi Vidyapeeth (PKV) for taking credit for the brand that he had originally bred on his farm and given to the university scientists. The PKV held that sourced it from him and significantly improved the variety with their scientific inputs. The issue remains unresolved till date. Recently there have been controversies regarding selection of staff. These were investigated and found correct as per recommendations of Justice Dhabe commission and the Ganesh Thakur committee. As per their recommendations a few staff members were removed or placed back to their original positions.

== See also ==
- Maharajbagh Zoo
- Krushi Vigyan Kendra, Buldhana
- Agriculture Research Station, Buldhana
- Agriculture Technicial College, Buldhana

== School Of Agribusiness Management, Nagpur ==
These is only one college offering MBA in specialization of Agribusiness Management MBA (ABM) in university having intake capacity of 30 students and admitted through MCAER PG CET-ABM exam after graduation from state agriculture university, Located in Ramdaspeth, Nagpur.
