= Sakkarbaug Zoological Garden =

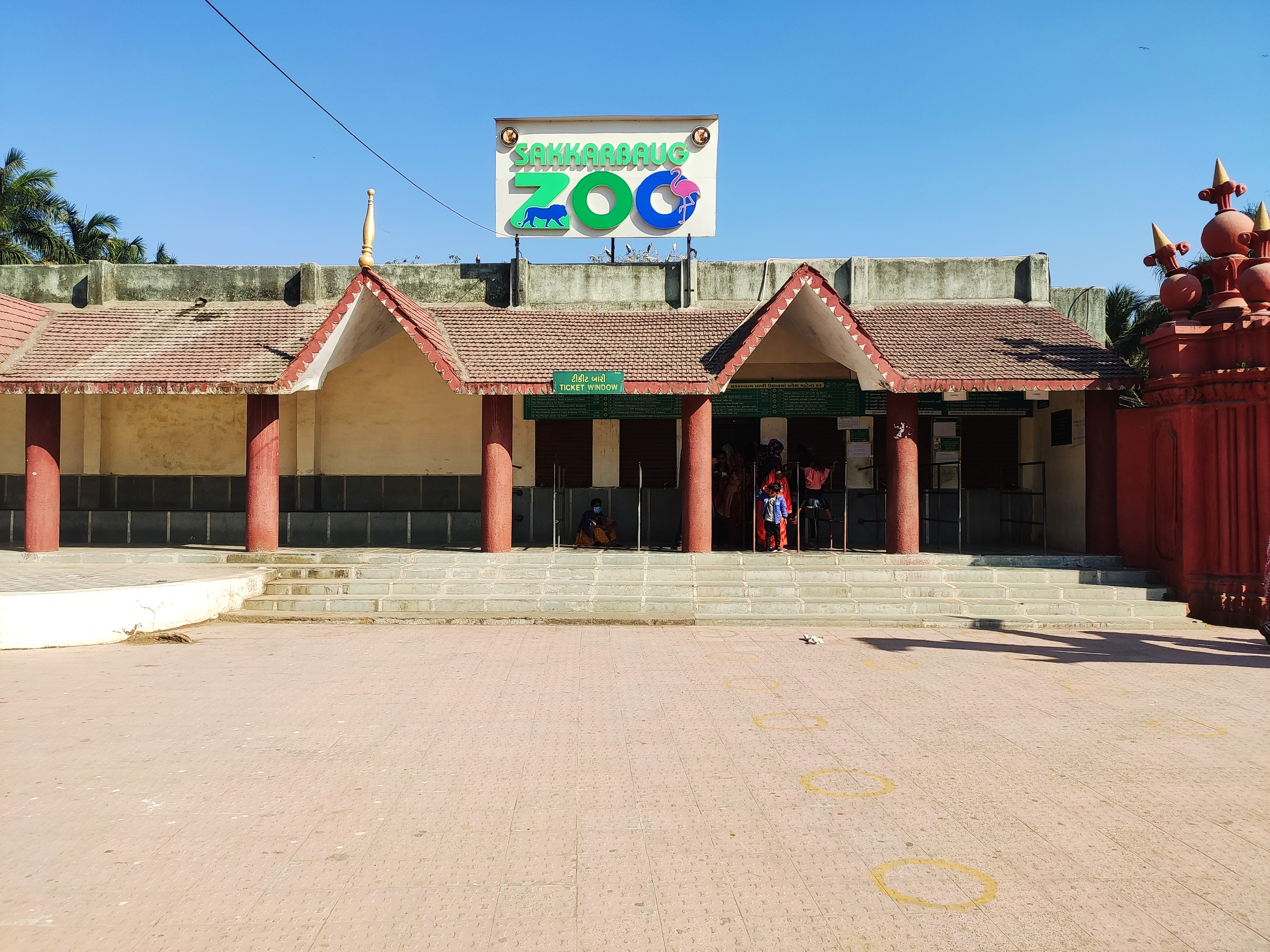
- Ticket Windows at Sakkarbaug Zoo
- Interactive map of Sakkarbaug Zoological Garden
- 21.542°N 70.465°E
- Date opened: 1863
- Location: Junagadh, Gujarat, India
- Land area: 84 hectares (210 acres)
- No. of animals: 1436 (2018)
- Annual visitors: 1139104
- Memberships: CZA

Sakkarbaug Zoological Garden also known as Sakkarbaug Zoo or Junagadh Zoo is an 84-hectare (210-acre) zoo that opened in 1863 at Junagadh, Gujarat, India. The zoo provides purebred Asiatic lions for the Indian and the international endangered species captive breeding program for the critically endangered species. Wild free ranging Asiatic lions have become extinct over most of Asia and are today found only in the nearby Gir Forest.

== History ==
The Sakkarbaug Zoo was established in 1863 by The Mohabat khanji Babi-II of Junagadh state. It is oldest zoo of India and fourth biggest zoo in India.

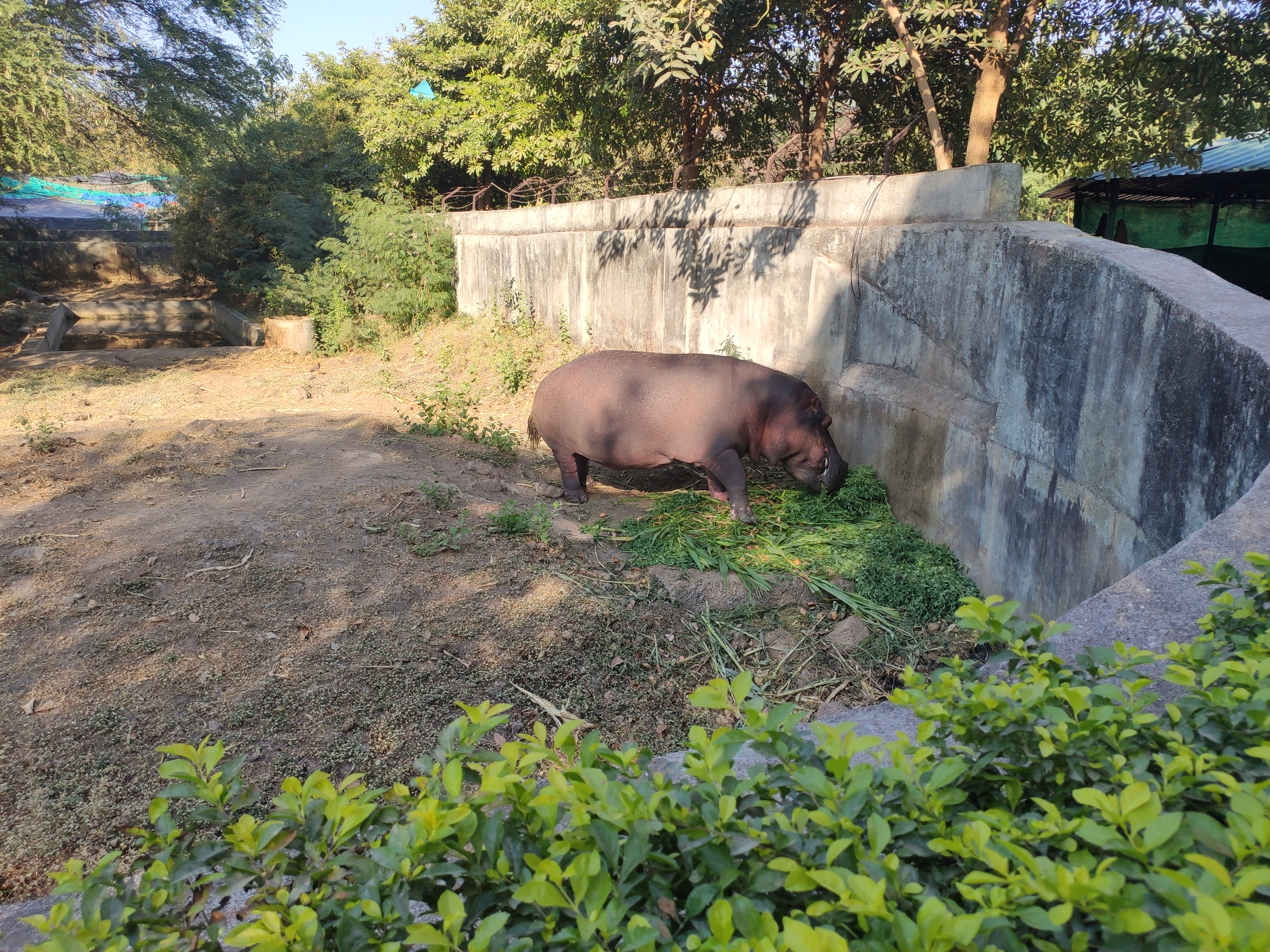
Hippopotamus in the zoo

In 2003 the zoo opened a natural history museum in a large hall in the veterinary hospital. The museum opened with the skeletons of two Asiatic lions, as well as panther, deer, wild boar, antelope, black buck, blue bull, and spotted deer. Eggs, beaks, and feathers of various birds were also on display. The museum will be expanded as specimens become available.

In 2008 the Sakkarbaug Zoo Management Advisory Society (initially with 10 members) was formed to develop and manage the zoo and its finances.

In 2009, Sakkarbaug Zoo became the only zoo in India to hold African cheetahs when it traded three of its lions with a Singapore zoo for two pairs of cheetahs. The last cheetah at the zoo had died over 60 years ago in 1946.

In 2011 the zoo received Indian gaur, Malabar giant squirrels, marmosets and green pheasants from Mysore Zoo in exchange for a pair of Asian lions. At this time, the zoo claimed to have 40 lions and lionesses in their genetic pool.

The zoo has been criticized for the size of some of its enclosures, but claims that it is in the process of upgrading them to meet the standards of the Central Zoo Authority of India (CZA), and hopes to be done by 2013.

== Animals ==
In 2008 the zoo was home to 525 mammals (30 per cent of which are under Schedule-I of the Wildlife Act), 597 birds (10 per cent of which are under Schedule-I), and 111 reptiles, housed in 100 enclosures.

== Conservation ==
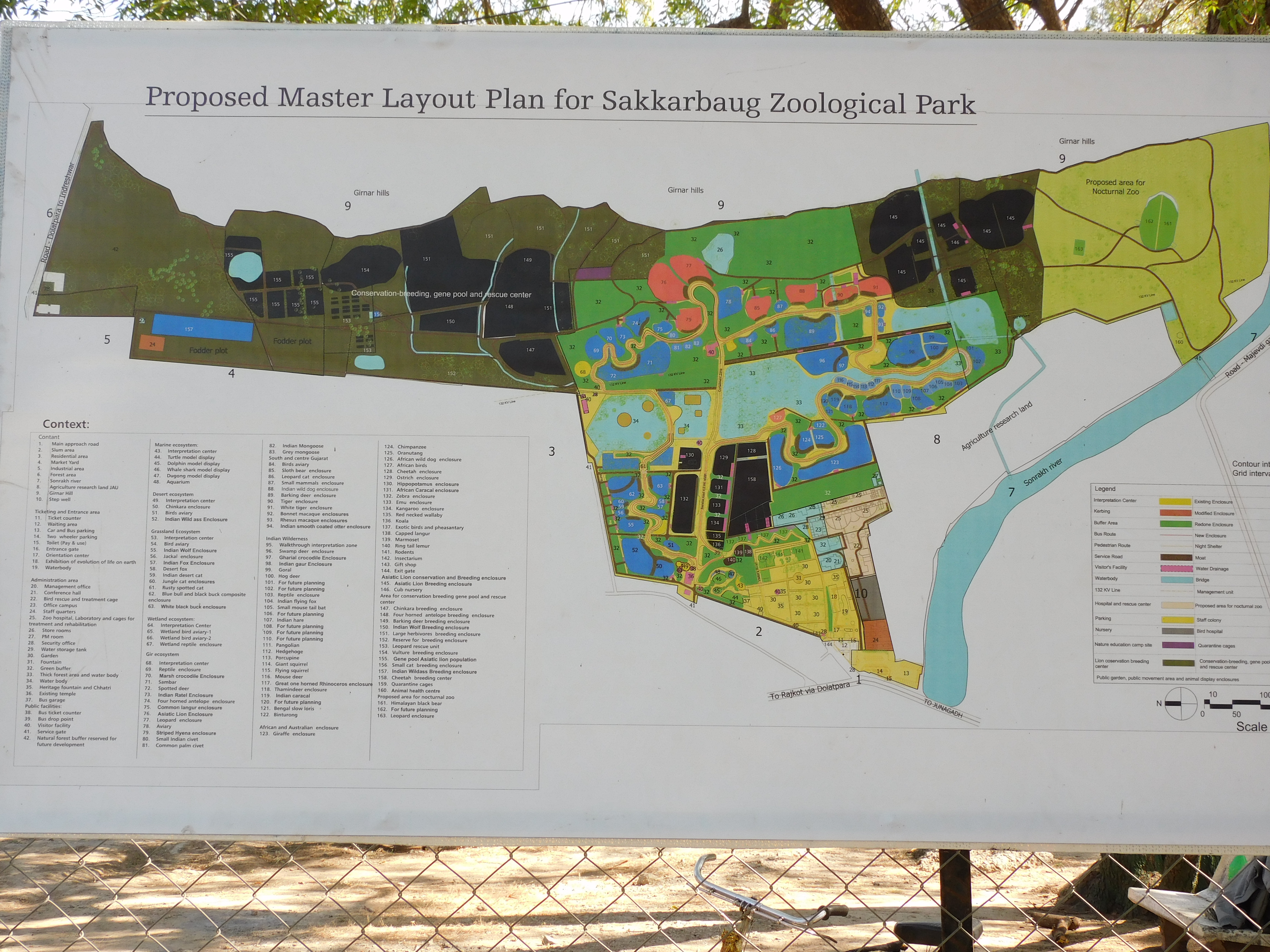
Conservation and expansion plans in Map of zoo - as of December 2021

In 1998 the Central Zoo Authority of India expanded the captive breeding program for Asiatic lions to include 10 other zoos. The program is jointly managed by the CZA and the Sakkarbaug Zoo, which is the largest breeding center, with nearly 150 lions having been bred by 2008.

The zoo is part of the breeding program for white-backed vultures. The first chick from this effort were born at the zoo's Vulture Conservation and Breeding Centre in February 2011.

== See also ==
- Arid Forest Research Institute
