= Gorewada Lake =

Lake in Maharashtra, India

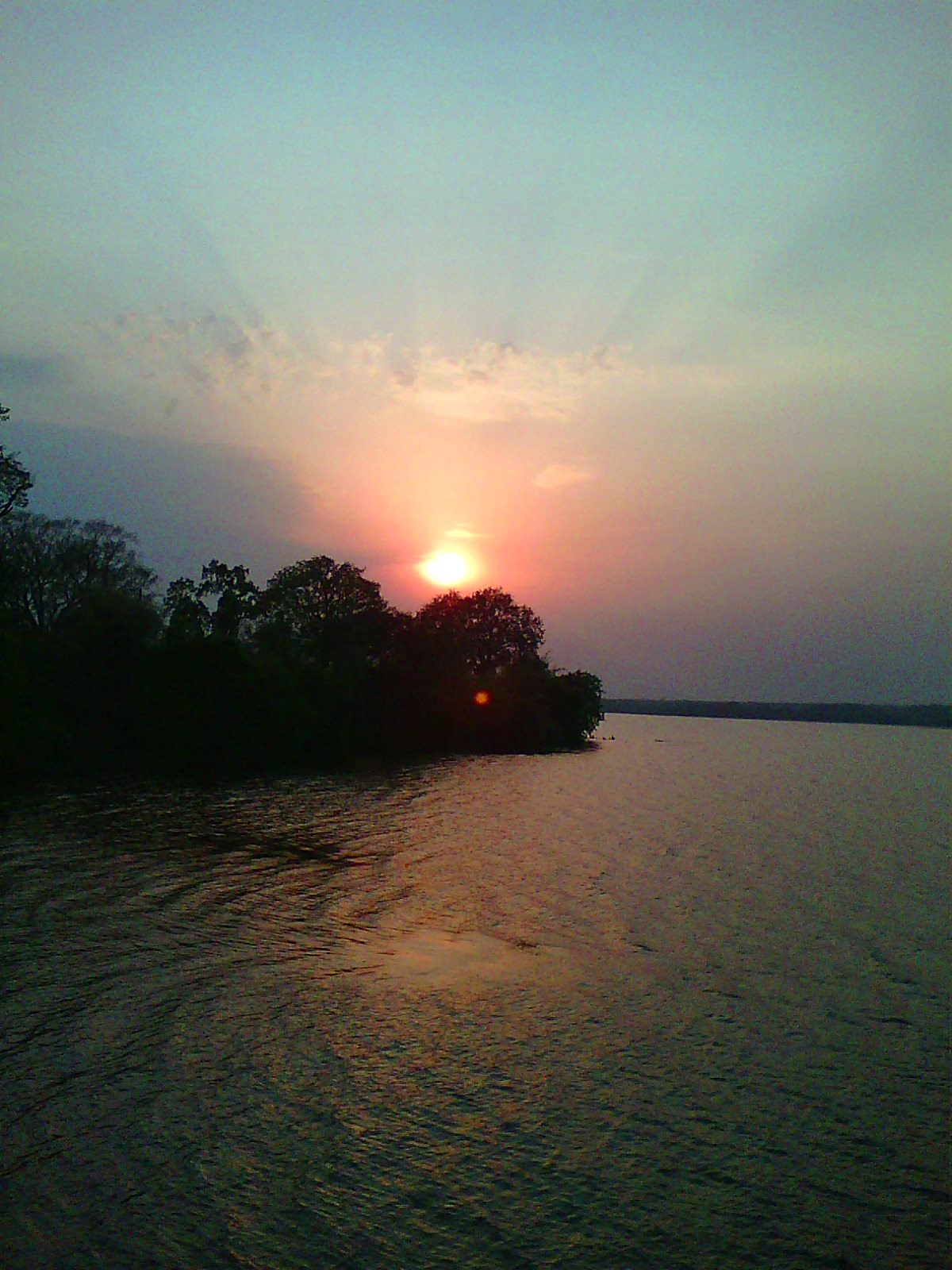

- Location within Maharashtra
- Location: Nagpur, Maharashtra
- Coordinates: 21°11′50″N 79°2′15″E
- Type: freshwater
- Primary outflows: Pili river
- Basin countries: India
- Settlements: Nagpur

Gorewada Lake is a water body in northwestern Nagpur. It is formed by 2,350 feet long dam wall.

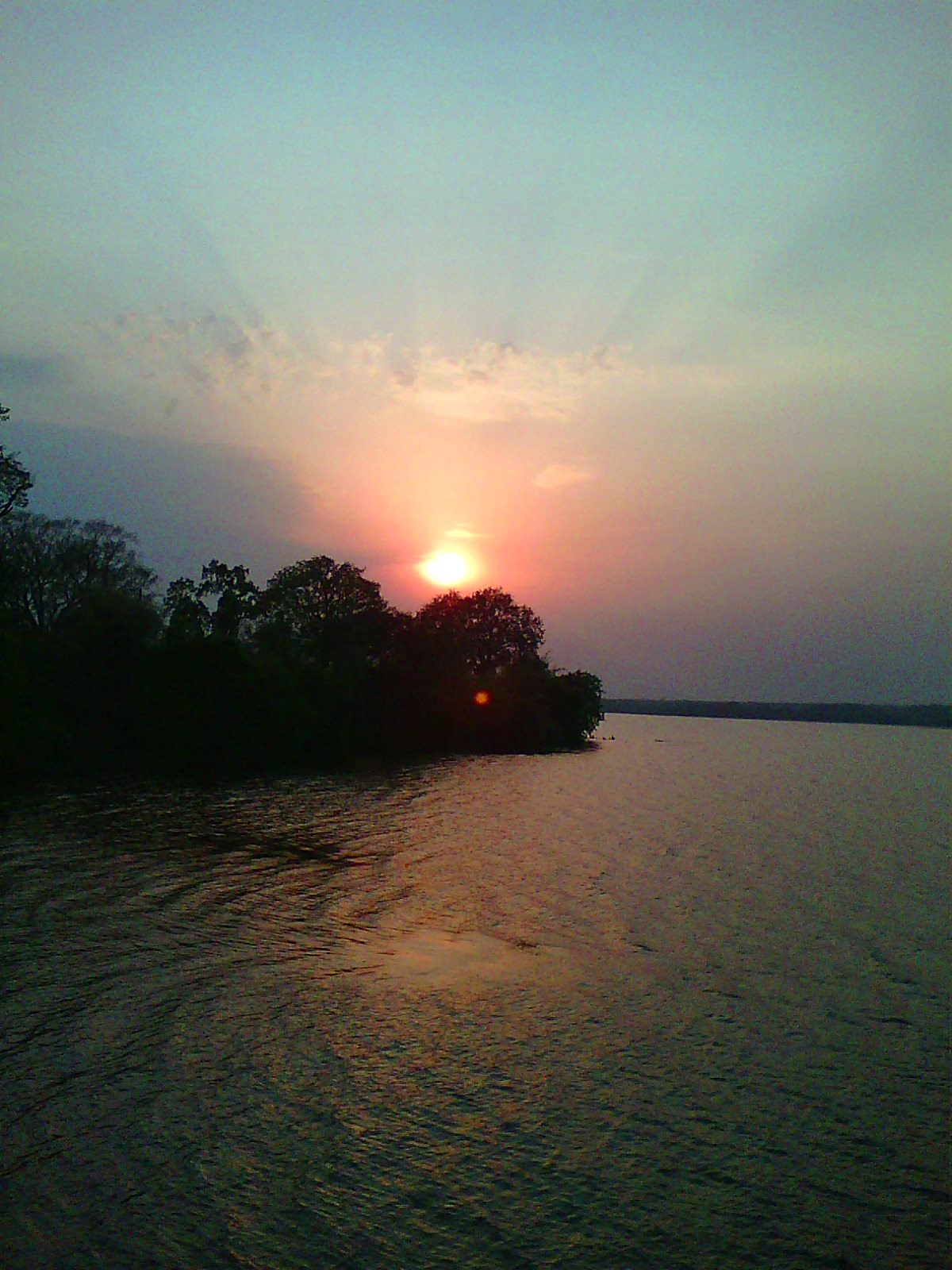
Sunset at Gorewada Lake as viewed from the waterworks section

Gorewada Lake was developed by the Waterworks Department in 1912 as the primary drinking water source for Nagpur's erstwhile population of 101,000 people. It is still the main source for drinking water in the city. Bordered by thick forest, the lake and its surroundings provide habitat for birds and other wildlife.The government of Maharashtra is currently developing a 1,914 hectare safari in the area surrounding the lake. Leopards, deer, peafowl, and other species can be spotted near the lake. The road near Gorewada Lake is called the Gorewada Ring Road. Neighborhoods near the lake include Jafar Nagar, Zingabai Takli, Borgaon, and Gittikhadan.
