= Pheasant Breeding Centre, Berwala =

- Pheasant wildlife protection
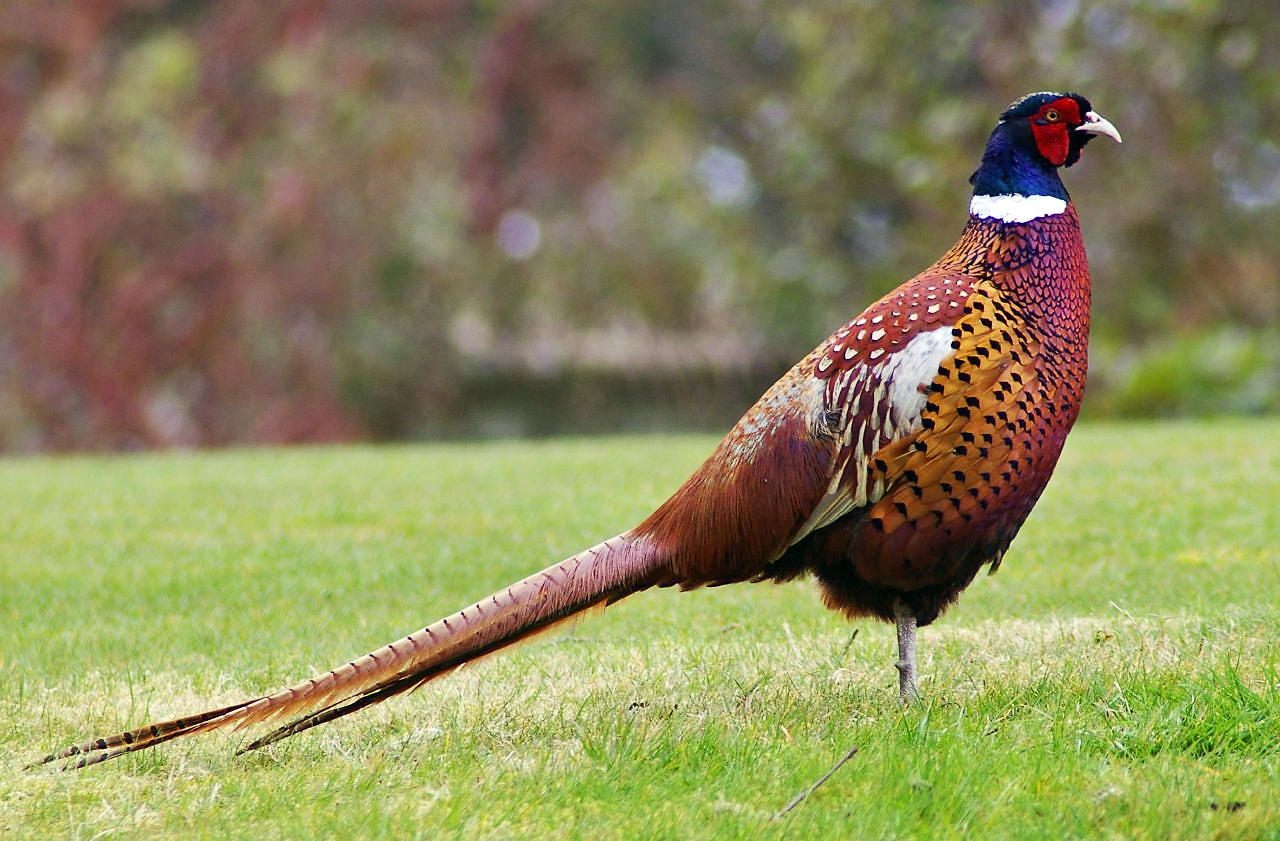

- Location in Haryana, India Pheasant Breeding Centre, Berwala (India)
- Coordinates: 30°42′8″N 77°5′16″E
- Country: India
- State: Haryana
- District: Panchkula district
- Established: 1992

Government
  - Type: Government of Haryana
  - Body: Forests Department, Haryana
- Time zone: UTC+5:30 (IST)
- Website: www.haryanaforest.gov.in

The Pheasant Breeding Centre, Berwala is a purpose-built centre for breeding pheasants situated in Berwala in the Panchkula district.

== Description ==
Several types of pheasants are bred, including red junglefowl (Gallus gallus), endangered cheer pheasant (Catreus wallichii) and endangered kalij pheasant. The centre has a program for breeding and releasing birds into the wild.
