= Central Zoo Authority =

Indian government agency that oversees zoos

- Logo

Agency overview
- Formed: 1992 (34 years ago)
- Jurisdiction: India
- Headquarters: Delhi, India
- Parent department: Ministry of Environment, Forest and Climate Change

The Central Zoo Authority (CZA) is the body of the Government of India responsible for oversight of zoos. It is an affiliate member of the World Association of Zoos and Aquariums (WAZA).

The CZA was formed to bring Indian zoos up to international standards. Before the CZA was formed, many zoos were poorly managed, with unsuitable animal enclosures and little or no breeding records of animals, which caused inbreeding and hybridization (genetic pollution, as in one case where an Asiatic lion were cross-bred with an African lion).

The Central Zoo Authority has been constituted under the section 38A of Wild Life (Protection) Act 1972. The Authority consists of a Chairman, ten members and a Member Secretary. The main objective of the authority is to complement the national effort in conservation of wild life. Standards and norms for housing, upkeep, health care and overall management of animals in zoos has been laid down under the Recognition of Zoo Rules, 1992. Every zoo in the country is required to obtain recognition from the Authority for its operation. The Authority evaluates the zoos with reference to the parameters prescribed under the Rules and grants recognition accordingly. Zoos which have no potential to come up to the prescribed standards and norms may be refused recognition and asked to close down.

Since its inception in 1992, the Authority has evaluated 347 zoos, out of which 164 have been recognised and 183 refused recognition. Out of 183 zoos refused recognition, 92 have been closed down and their animals relocated suitably. Cases of the remaining 91 non-recognised zoos are currently under review. The Authority's role is more of a facilitator than a regulator. It, therefore, provides technical and financial assistance to such zoos which have the potential to attain the desired standard in animal management. Only such captive facilities which have neither the managerial skills nor the requisite resources are asked to close down.

Apart from the primary function of grant of recognition and release of financial assistance, the Central Zoo Authority also regulates the exchange of animals of endangered category Listed under Schedule-I and II of the Wildlife Protection Act among zoos. Exchange of animals between Indian and foreign zoos is also approved by the Authority before the requisite clearances under EXIM Policy and the CITES permits are issued by the competent authority.

The Authority also coordinates and implements programmes on capacity building of zoo personnel, planned breeding programmes and ex situ research including biotechnological intervention for conservation of species for complementing in-situ conservation efforts in the country. Some of the major initiatives undertaken by the Authority since its inception include establishment of a laboratory for conservation of endangered species at Hyderabad for carrying out research in biotechnology, planned breeding of red panda and its restocking into the wild, upgrading diagnostic facilities for disease diagnosis at selected veterinary institutions and their networking with zoos on regional basis for better health care of animals.

== See also ==
- List of Botanical Gardens in India and the "Indian portion" of the international List of botanical gardens
- List of zoos in India
- Laboratory for the Conservation of Endangered Species
