= Ch. Devi Lal Herbal Nature Park =

Ch. Devi Lal Rudraksh Vatika Herbal Nature Park churhpur kalan Yanumanagar
- Herbal Park
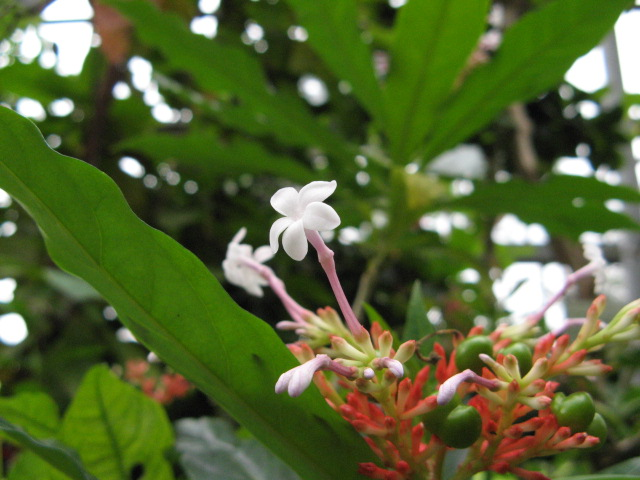
- Ayurvedic Herb Sarpagandha (Rauvolfia serpentina)

- Location in Haryana, India Ch. Devi Lal Rudraksh Vatika Herbal Nature Park churhpur kalan Yanumanagar (India)
- Coordinates: 30°16′14″N 77°29′11″E
- Country: India
- State: Haryana
- District: Yamunanagar
- Village chuhadpur kalan: chuhadpur kalan
- Established: 2001
- Founder: then Chief Minister of Harayana Om Prakash Chautala
- Named for: former Chief Minister of Harayana Chaudhari Devi Lal

Government
  - Type: Government of Haryana
  - Body: Forests Department, Haryana

Languages
  - Official: Hindi
- Time zone: UTC+5:30 (IST)
- PIN: 135106
- Website: www.haryanaforest.gov.in

The Ch. Devi Lal Rudraksh Vatika Herbal Nature Park, in short Rudraksh Vatika, is a 184-acre forested wildlife area, wetland and herbal park for the conservation of biodiversity of over 400 endangered ayurvedic medicinal herbs in Shivalik foothills of Himalayas. It is located on the western bank of Western Yamuna Canal, 1.3 km east of NH-907, in Chuharpur Kalan village of Yamunanagar district of Haryana state in India.

== Background ==
=== Location ===
It lies 1.3 km east of NH-907 (from "Nirvan Ashram", which is between Chuharpur Kalan and Khizrabad), on the western bank of Western Yamuna Canal. It is 32 km northeast of Yamunanagar city, 8 km southwest of Tajewala Barrage, 11 km southwest of Hathni Kund Barrage, 32 km south of holy city of Paonta Sahib, 95 km northeast of holy city of Kurukshetra, 87 east of Ambala, 108 km southeast of Haryana state capital Chandigarh, and 272 km north of national capital Delhi.

=== History ===
In November 2001, the park was founded by the Forests Department of Government of Haryana, under a central govt funded herbal park scheme. It was established on the forests department's land which already had khair and eucalyptus plantation. Those plants were retained and using the layered forestry technique over 400 rare and endangered herbs and medicinal plants were planted.

In 2002, a statue of Devi Lal, a political dynast of Haryana, was installed at tax payer's expense and the government owned public park was renamed after him during the political rule of one of his son Om Prakash Chautala who was later convicted by the court and imprisoned for scam in an unrelated case.

On 19 April 2003 evening, then President of India, A. P. J. Abdul Kalam, visited the park for an hour. He is highly respected as India's scientist with a moniker "The Missile Man". He planted a sacred rudraksha plant, which initially bore "Teen Mukhi Rudraksha" (3-faced rudraksha seeds) in 2009-2010 and now it produces the highly sought after "Ek Mukhi Rudraksha" (single faced rudraksha seeds). The tree planted by the President Kalam and its "Ek Mukhi Rudraksha" are very popular among visitors. President Kalam wanted to stay overnight at the herbal park which his security staff did not allow. President Kalam, who had planted a smaller herbal grove in Rashtrapati Bhavan, was inspired to visit this herbal park after he learnt it had over 400 species of herbs. President entertained questions from visitors, specially the children, and when asked "why did you not marry" his reply "I never had time for it" was received with all around laughter. He liked the park and wanted to return to the park. The seat on which he sat, has been reserved for him and no one else is allowed to sit on it. Preserved in situ and tagged with his name plate, it still awaits the return of India's now-deceased popular President Kalam.

== Flora ==
The park, spread on 184 acre land with resident forestry staff, is known for the sacred groves with over 400 species of ayurvedic and herbal plants. It is located in the shivalik foothills of himalayas, an area rich in biodiversity of medicinal plant species. It was developed to conserve and propagate medicinal plants in Haryana to meet the rising national and international demand and commercial potential.

=== Over 400 species of herbs and medicinal plants ===
Park has over 400 species of medicinal plants, including tulsi (holy basil) with at least five species, hard, baheda, giloy, brahmi booti, shankhpushpi, gular, parijat / harshingar (nyctanthes arbor-tristis), rusha ghass or ginger grass), latkan, double chandani, amaryllis belladonna, lemon grass, lemon, turmeric, plumeria, sehjan, champaka, chameli, tej patta, kumkum, garlic vine, black bamboo, gond katira, nandina, vishnukanta, kaneri, van pyaj, cardamom, etc.

To educate the visitors, herbs and plants are tagged with dual language Hindi-English name plates, which have both the common and scientific name of each species.

=== Theme-based groves ===
The themed groves in the park including the following (help expand the partial list):

- "Navagraha vatika" for plants related to the nine classical planets recognised in Indian astrology.
- "Panchavati vatika" for groves of five sacred trees in Indian-origin religions, such as Hinduism, Buddhism and Jainism, these are chosen from among the Vata (ficus benghalensis, Banyan), Ashvattha (ficus religiosa, Peepal), Bilva (aegle marmelos, Bengal Quince), Amalaki (phyllanthus emblica, Indian Gooseberry, Amla), Ashoka (Saraca asoca, Ashok), Udumbara (ficus racemosa, Cluster Fig, Gular), Nimba (Azadirachta indica, Neem) and Shami (prosopis spicigera, Indian Mesquite).
- "Rashi vatika" for plants related to astrological signs of Indian astrology.
- "Rudraksha vatika" for rudraksha trees, the fruitstones of which are considered sacred in some Indian-origin religions. This grove is the special attraction of the park, after which the park has been named.
- "Sugandh vatika" for fragrant plants.
- "Triveni vatika", grove of 3 trees sacred to Indian-origin religions (Hinduism, Buddhism and Jainism), which are the vata (ficus benghalensis, banyan), ashvattha (ficus religiosa, peepal), and Nimba (azadirachta indica, neem).

== Fauna ==
=== Leopards ===
A large part of the park is wooded forest which has not been landscaped or developed. This area houses several leopards as this area in the shivalik hills leopard habitat is close to several wildlife national parks such as Kalesar National Park within Haryana, adjacent Simbalbara National Park in Himachal Pradesh and Rajaji National Park in Uttrakhand - all of which are known leopard habitat.

=== Wetlands and migratory birds ===
The park has lakes and water body, which are visited by the wildlife. During the winter, October/November to February/March, there are numerous migratory birds including several endangered species which make these wetland in the park their winter home. The park is specially popular with bird watchers in the winter season. During the parched summers the wetland provides water for the fauns of the area.

== Visitors facilities ==
=== Visitors center ===
The herbal park has a visitors center cum interpretation center with toilet and drinking water. Park has ample car parking, paved walking trails with seats and landscaping. There is a forest "machan" (observation tower) for viewing the area which is popular among visitors as a selfie point.

=== Forest eco-resort ===
There are 5 air-conditioned forests cottages with ensuite bathroom, built with sustainable renewable materials, for visitors to stay overnight. These cost INR 1950 per night in 2019. There is a friendly government employed caretaker cum guide.

=== Nursery and plant sales ===
The park has an in-situ government run nursery which always has a ready stock of 200,000 - 250,000 medicinal plants which are sold to farmers and visitors on an affordable fixed-price rate list decide by the government. Green house has large selection of plants.

== Concerns ==
=== Demand for enhanced conservation and research ===
Ecologists have demanded establishment of wildlife corridor, by purchasing the land and planting the appropriate habitat, to Yamuna river bank and Kalesar National Park. Wetland must be expanded by constructing additional water channels with selective plants species appropriate for migratory birds. In situ breeding centre for the endangered gharial (which could be a fenced off wetland) and native freshwater turtle species. Schemes of various departments must be converged, purchase contiguous land for expansion, establish Maharana Pratap Horticultural University's research station at this park with the view to convert it to Haryana state's first "Shivalik Herbal and Wildlife University" focused on flora and fauns suitable for the geo-climatic conditions of shivalik area of Haryana.

=== Demand for improved customer services and monetisation ===
Visitors have demanded expansion and upgrade of facilities. To achieve this, economists have suggested leasing the resort to boost service, revenue, employment and tax collection.

=== Demand for renaming after horticulturist or wildlife expert ===
Civic society and voters have been demanding the end to the misuse of tax-payers state funds and institutes to perpetuate the hegemony of political dynasties by wasting money on their statues and by naming government funded institutes and entities after them specially in the areas in which they had no expertise. There is demand to rename the institute after one of Haryana state's prominent well-awarded horticulture, agriculture, or wildlife scientist or expert, and the politician's statue be remodelled after some post-independence martyr of the armed forces hailing from this area.

== Images of type of herbs species at park ==
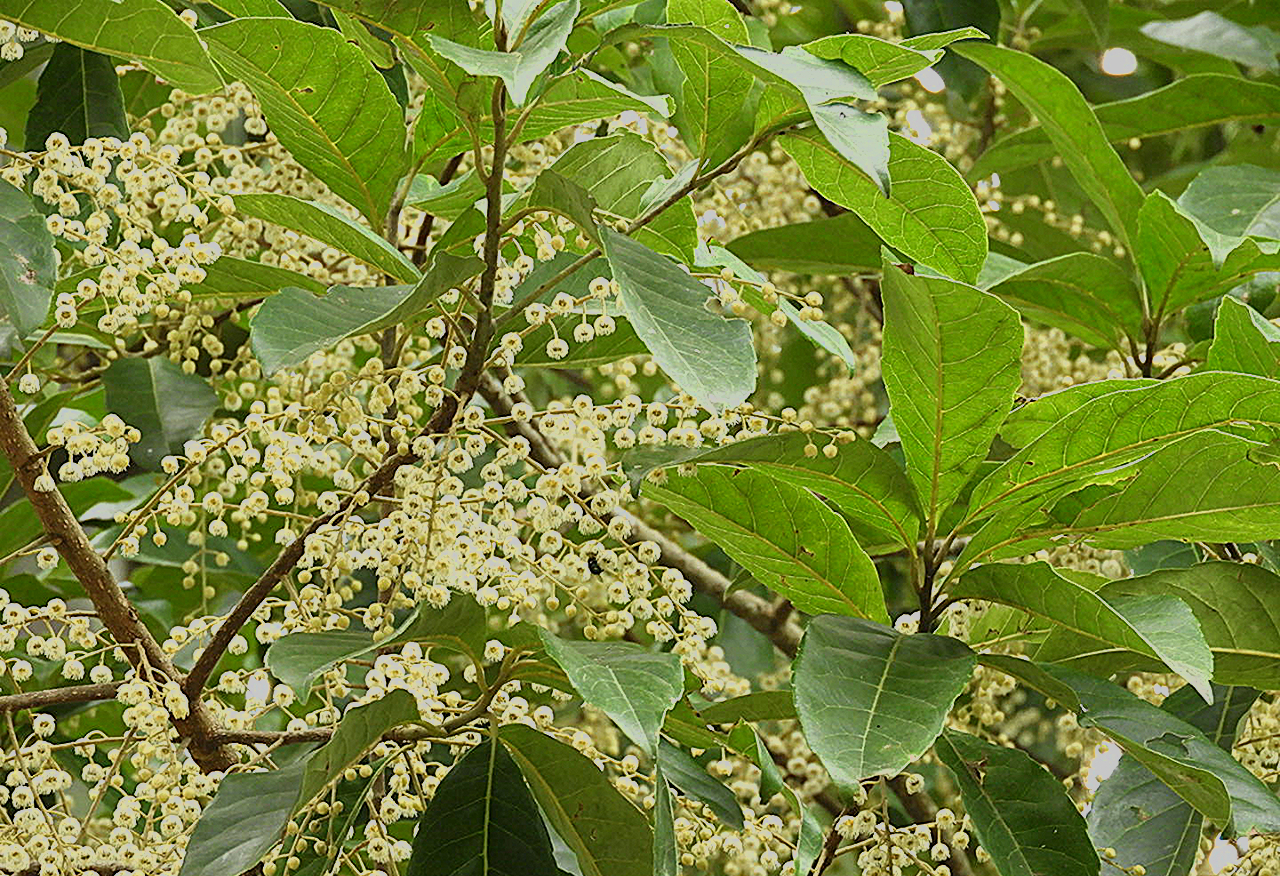
Rudraksha tree with flowers.

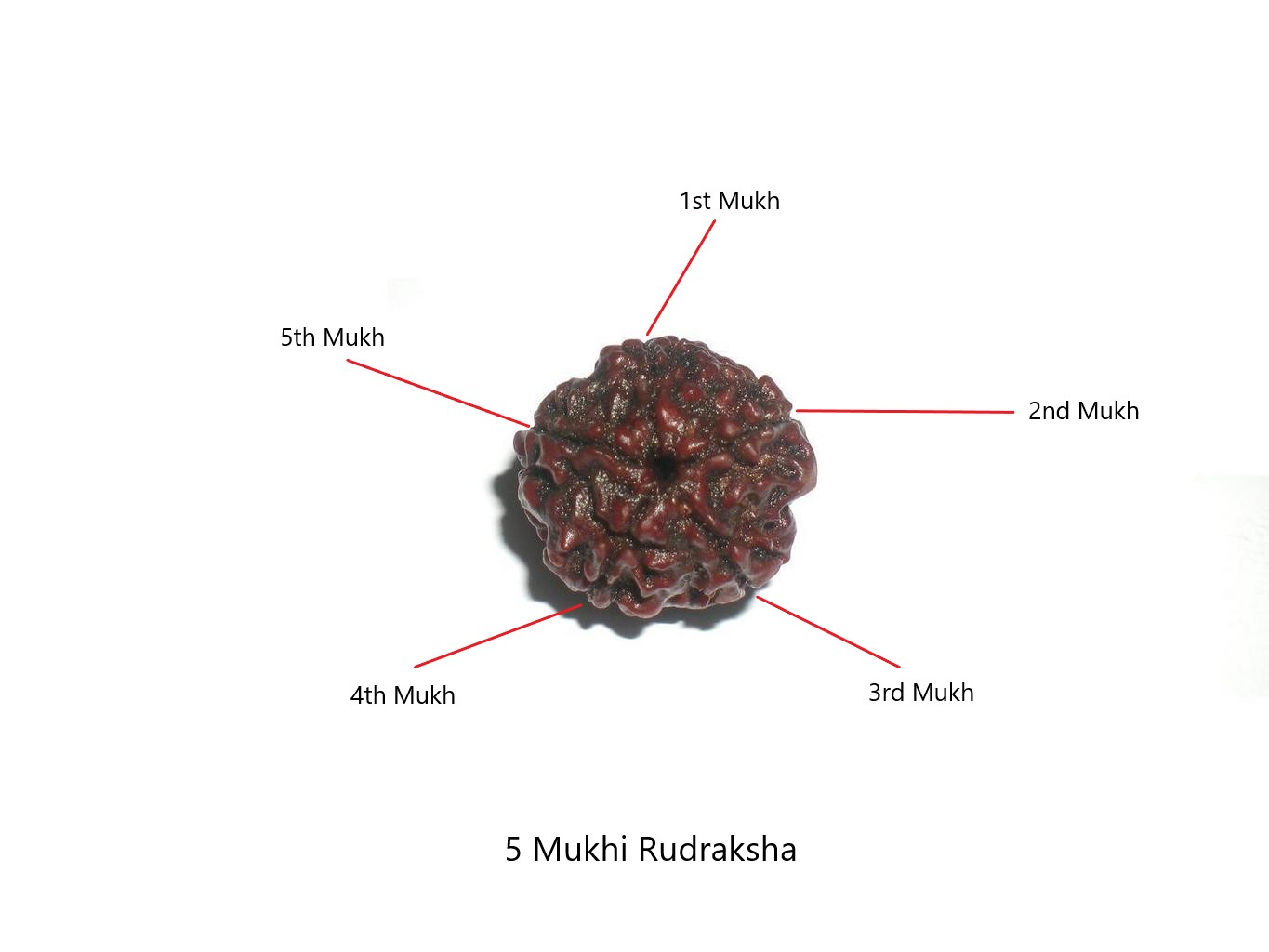
Panch-mukhi rudraksha

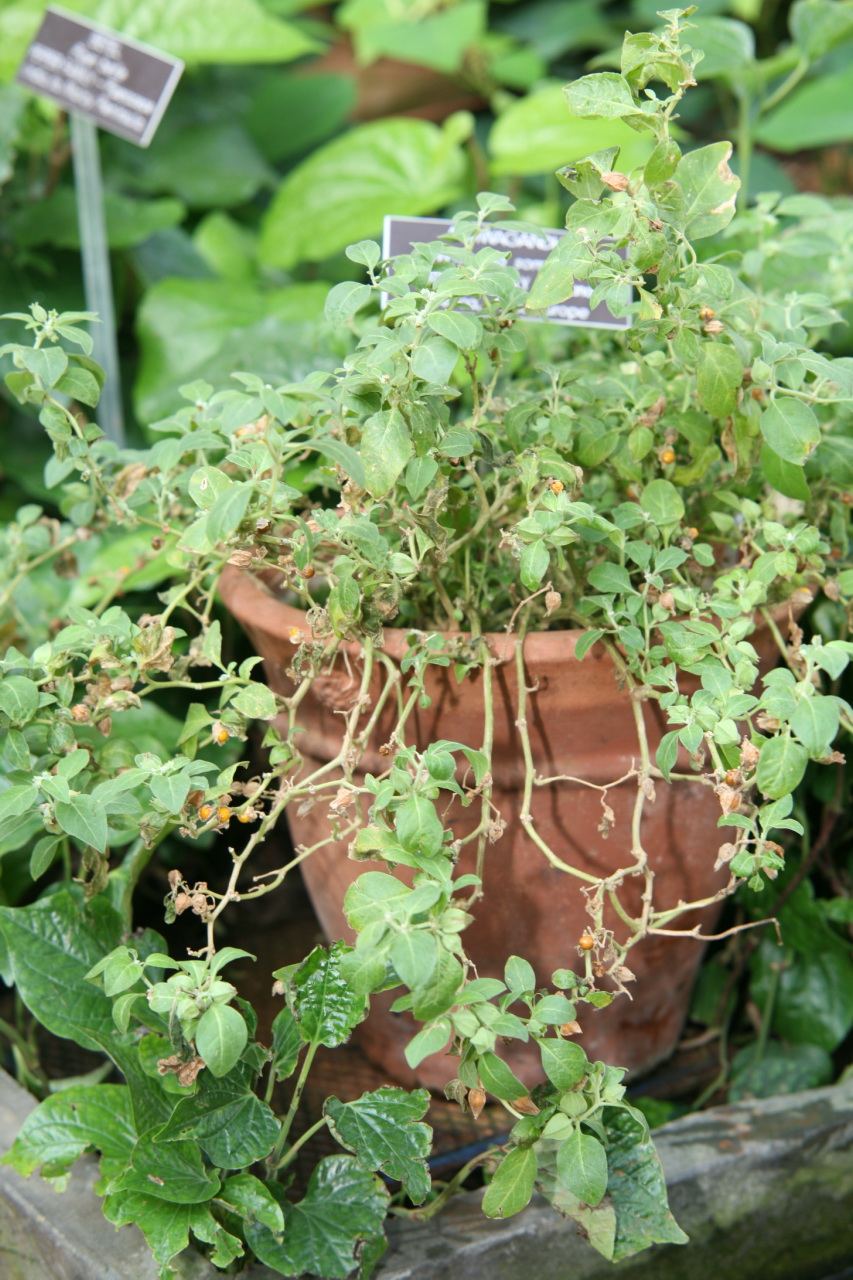
Ayurvedic Herb Ashvagandha (Indian Ginseng) (Withania somnifera)

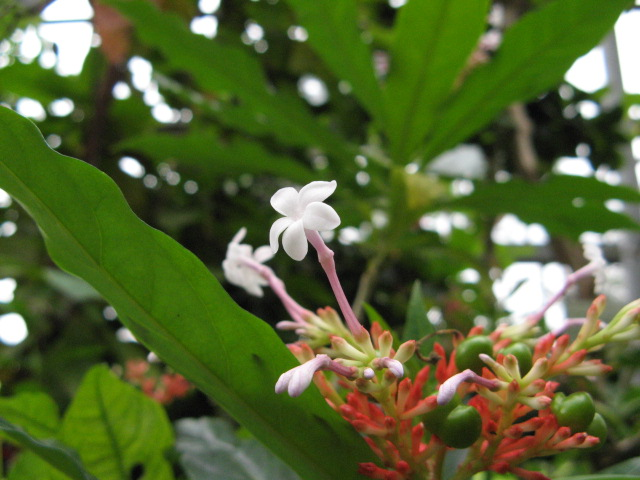
Ayurvedic Herb Sarpagandha (Rauvolfia serpentina)

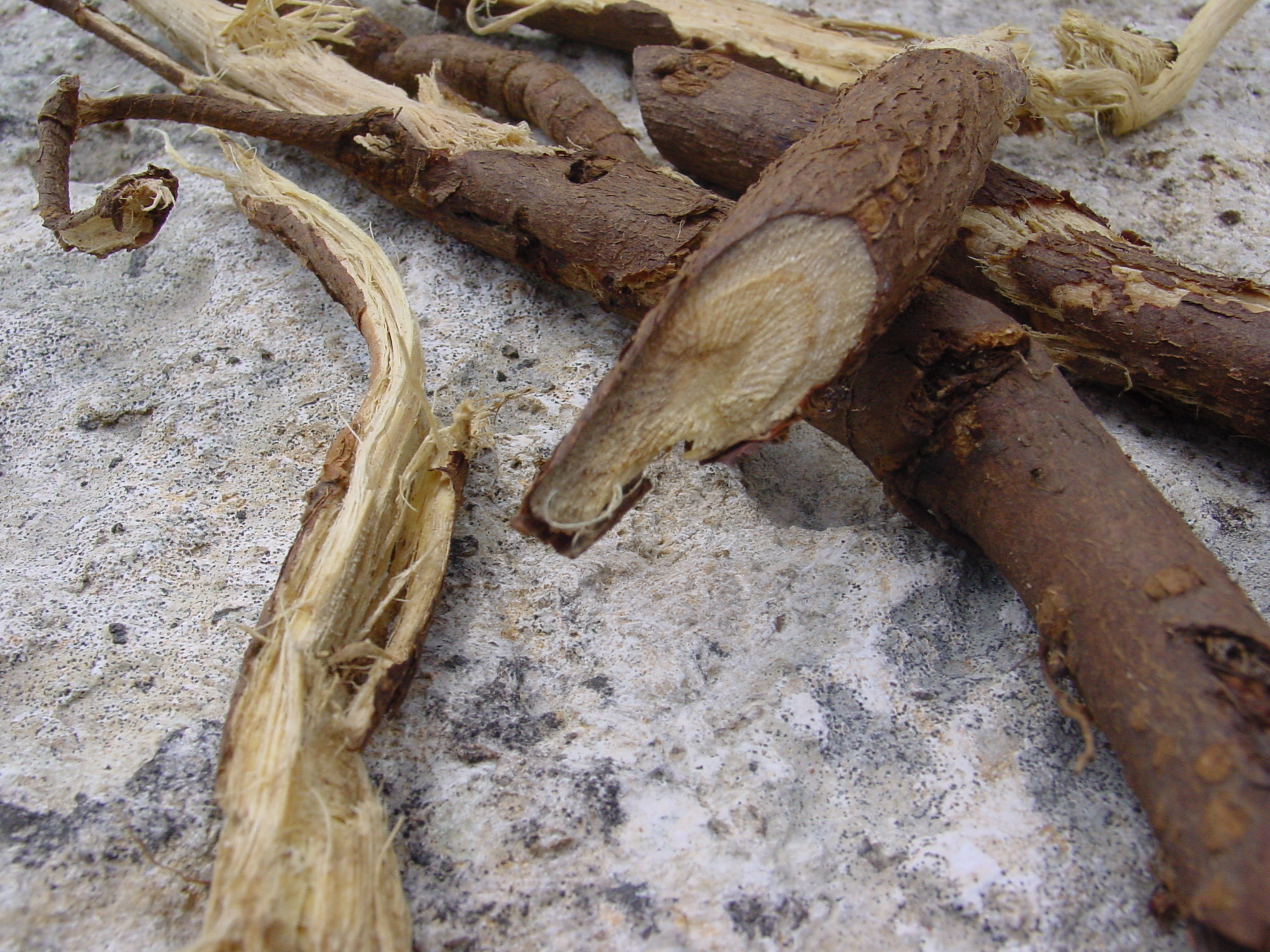
Ayurvedic Herb Mulethi (Liquorice) roots with bark

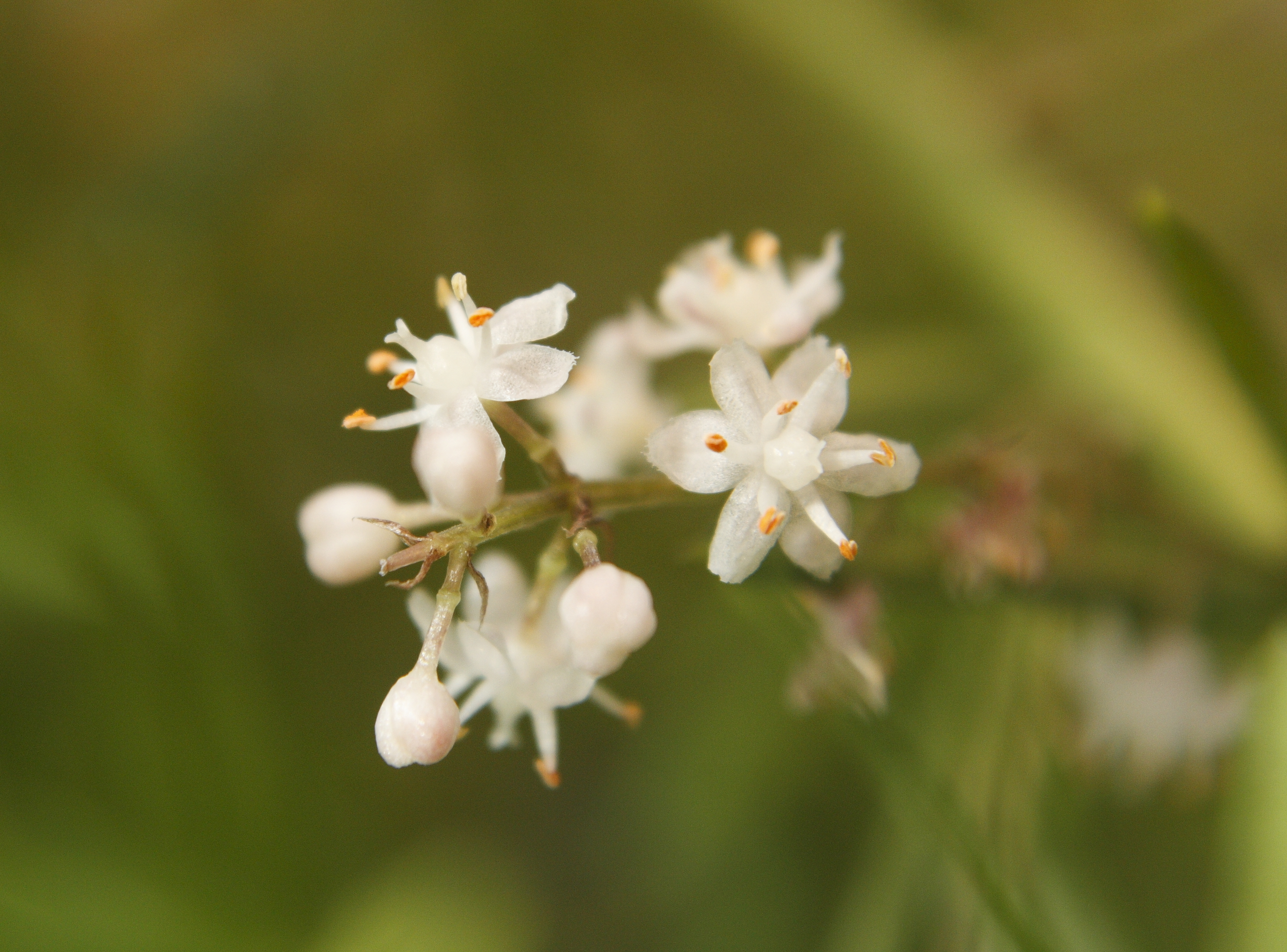
Flowers of Ayurvedic Herb Shatavar (Asparagus racemosus)

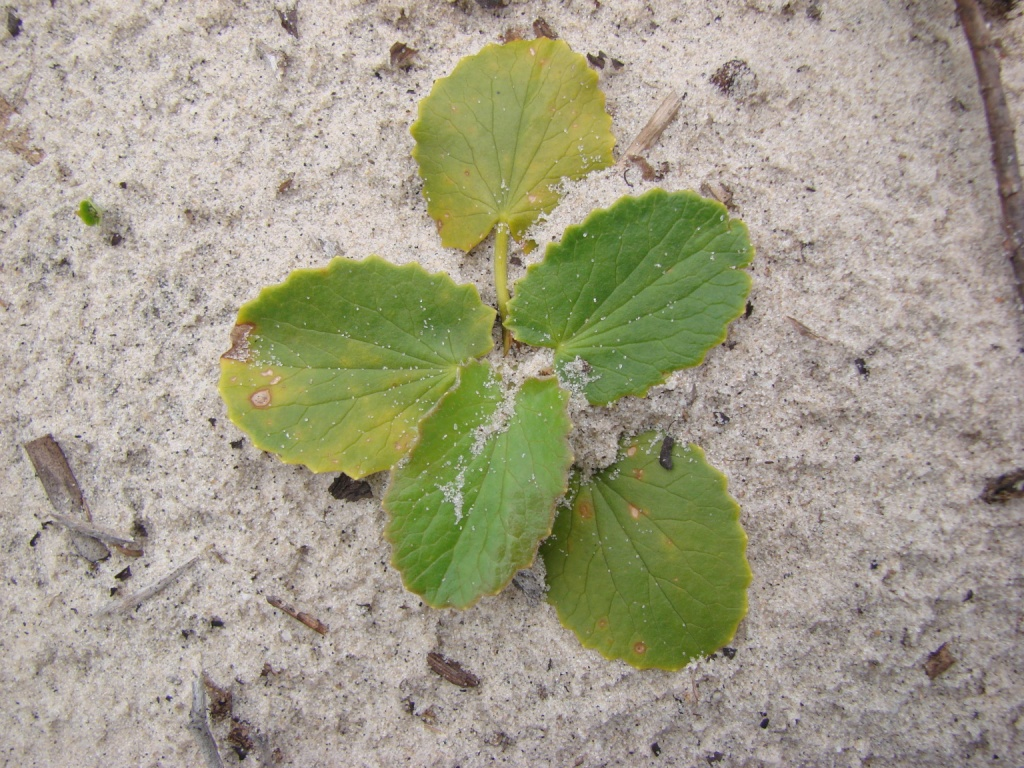
Brahmibooti (Centella asiatica)

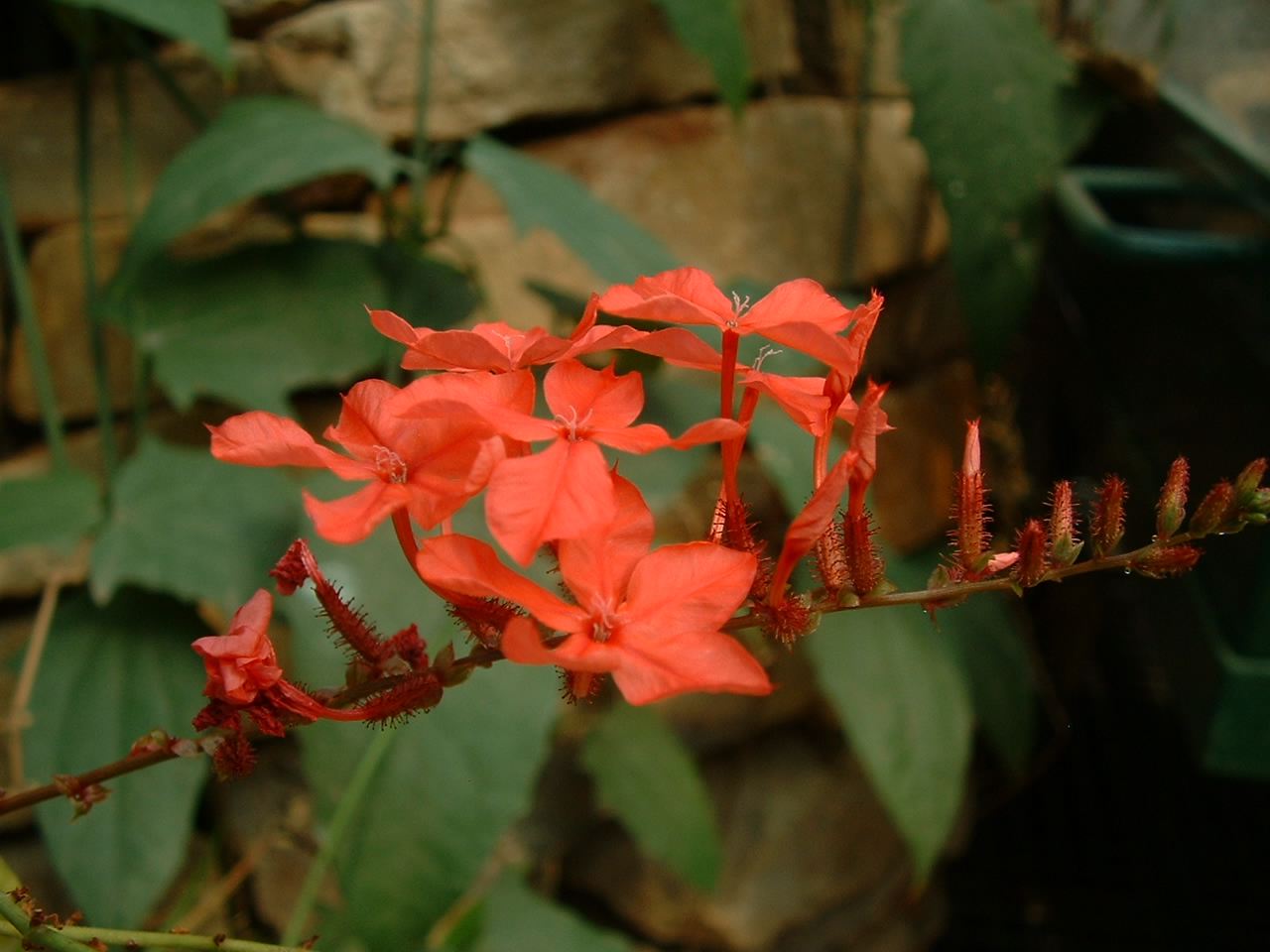
Chitrak (Plumbago)

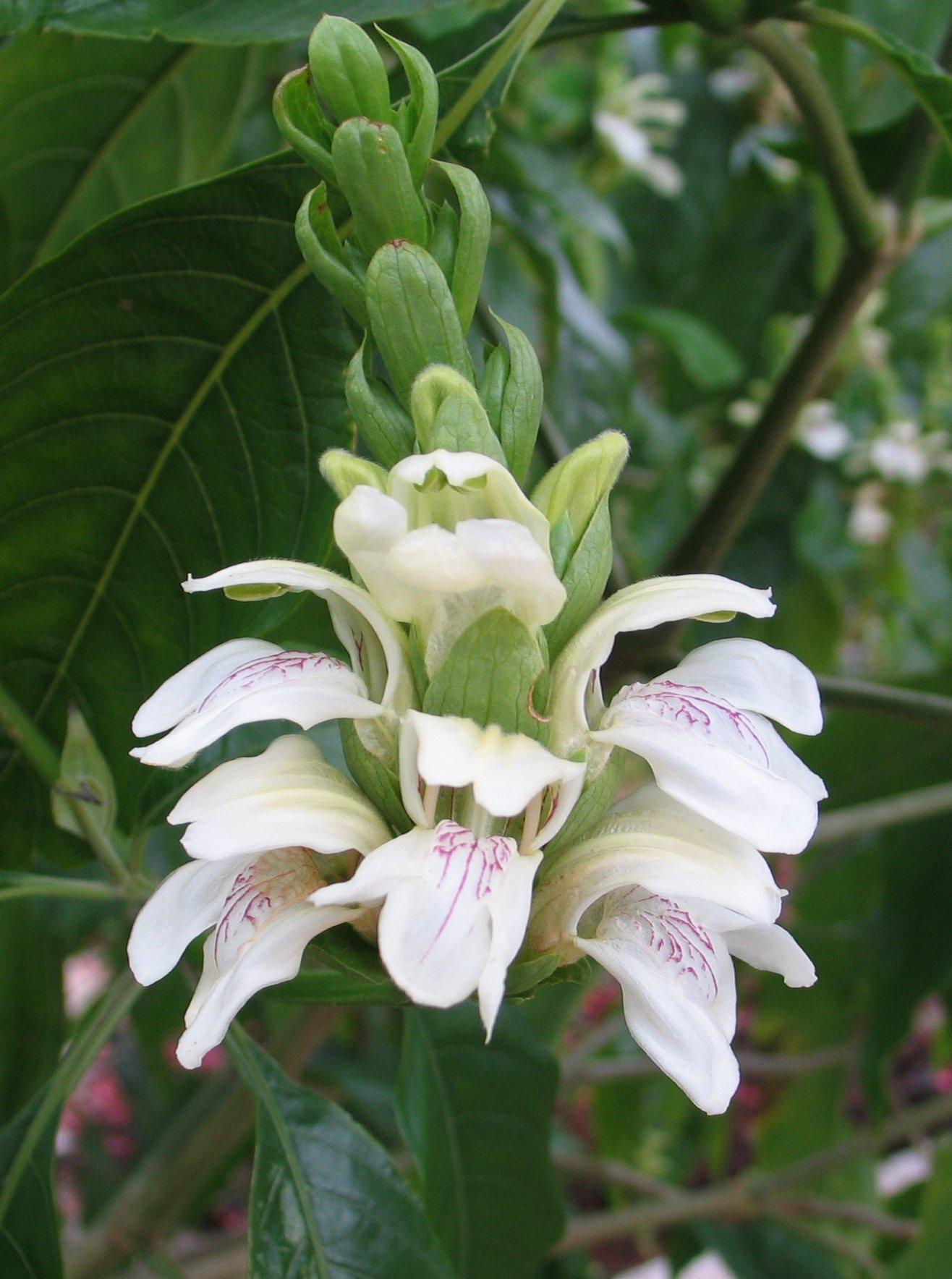
Baansa (Justicia adhatoda)

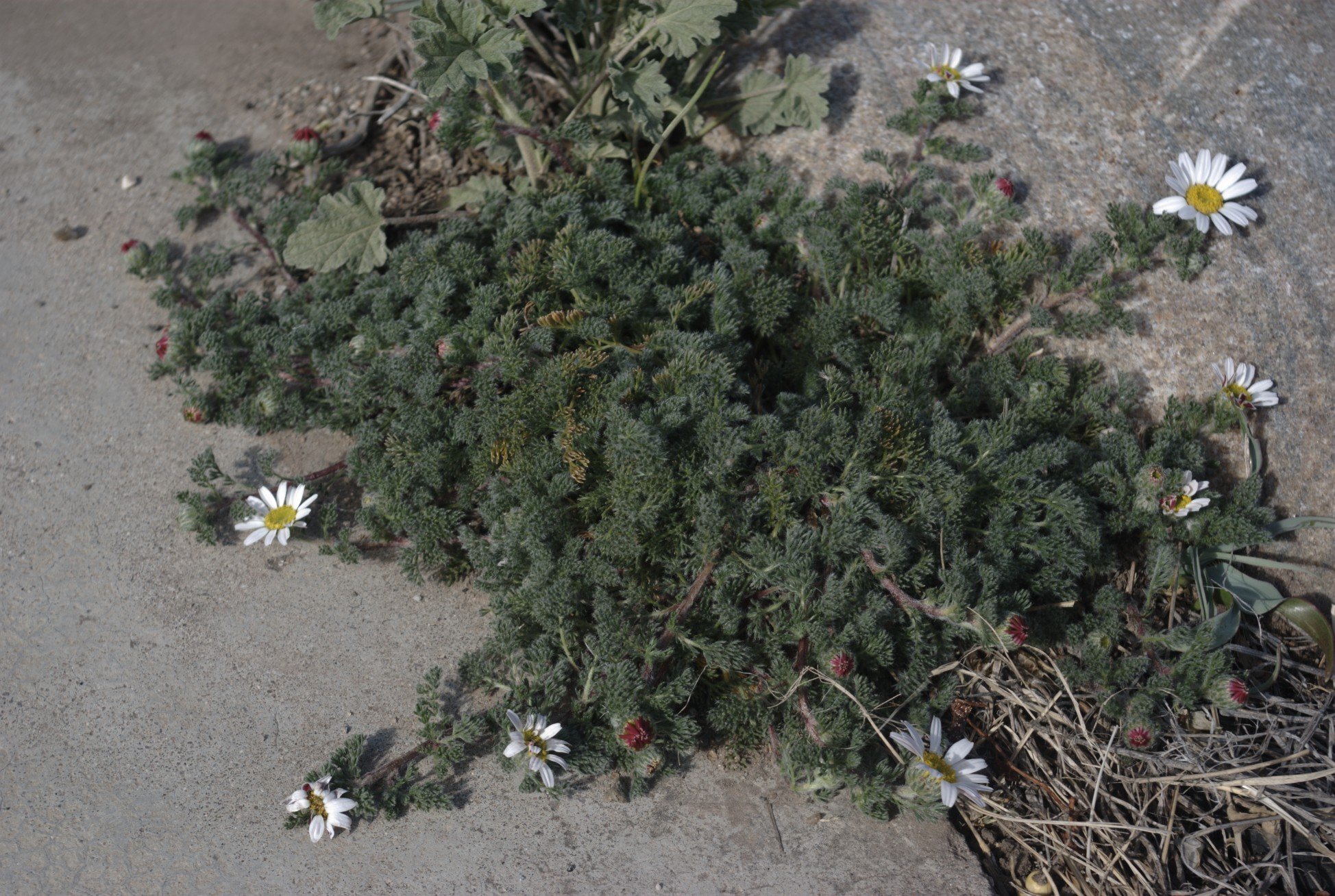
Akarkara (Anacyclus pyrethrum root)

== See also ==
- Herbal parks in Haryana
  - Shatavar Vatika Herbal Park, Hisar
  - Ch. Surender Singh Memorial Herbal Park, Tosham, on Hisar-Bhiwani road in Tosham
  - Ch. Surender Singh Memorial Herbal Park, Kairu, Kairu village near Bahal
- Nearby attractions
  - Vulture Conservation and Breeding Centre, Pinjore
  - Pheasant Breeding Centre Morni
- Nature
  - Bodhi Tree
  - List of banyan trees in India
  - List of National Parks & Wildlife Sanctuaries of Haryana, India
  - List of national parks of India
  - Sacred groves of India
  - Sacred trees
  - Wildlife sanctuaries of India

== Citations ==
=== External links ===
- Google map
