= Ch. Surender Singh Memorial Herbal Park, Tosham =

Ch. Surender Singh Memorial Herbal Park
- Herbal Park
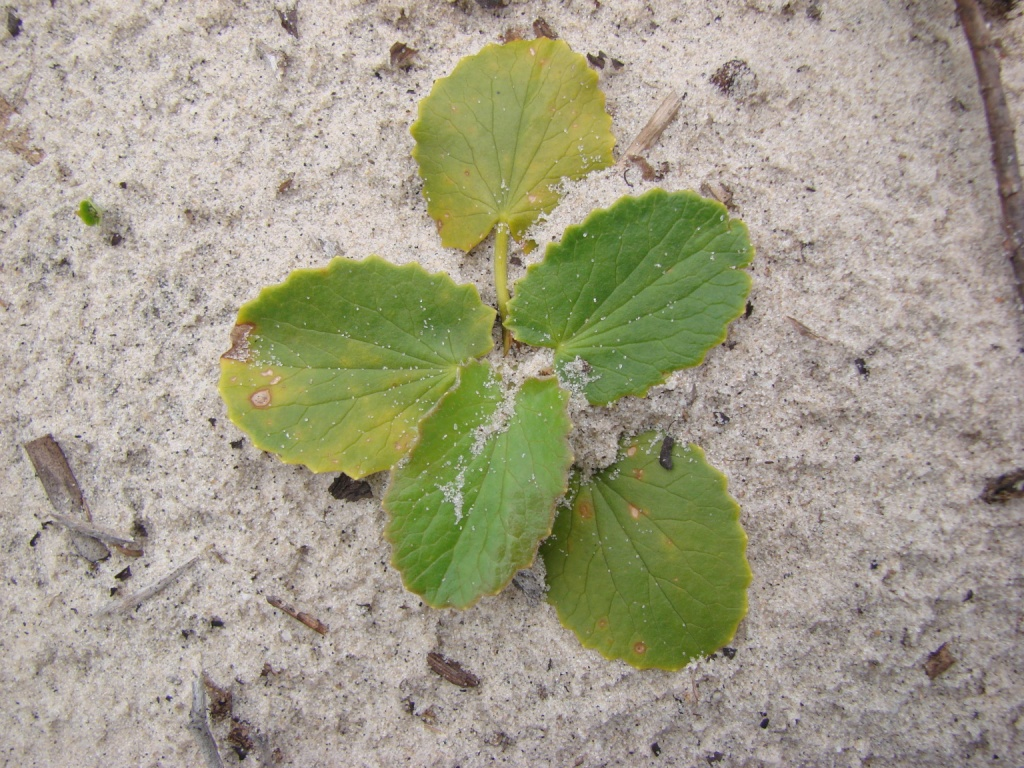
- Ayurvedic Herb Brahmibooti (Centella asiatica)

- Location in Haryana, India Ch. Surender Singh Memorial Herbal Park (India)
- Coordinates: 28°52′4″N 75°55′20″E
- Country: India
- State: Haryana
- District: Hisar
- Established: 2008
- Founder: Haryana's Forests Minister Kiran Choudhry
- Named for: Surender Singh

Population (2011)
  - Total: 9,894

Languages
  - Official: Hindi
- Time zone: UTC+5:30 (IST)
- PIN: 127029
- Telephone code: +91-(01253)
- ISO 3166 code: IN-HR
- Website: www.haryanaforest.gov.in

Ch. Surender Singh Memorial Herbal Park, Tosham is a herbal and medicinal plants park in Tosham town of Bhiwani district in the Indian state of Haryana.

It should not be confused with similarly named Ch. Surender Singh Memorial Herbal Park, Kairu (Hindi: चौधरी सुरेंद्र सिंह स्मारक जड़ी बूटी उद्यान, कैरू) in Kairu village, both are located in Bhiwani district in the Indian state of Haryana.

== Location ==
Ch. Surender Singh Memorial Herbal Park, Tosham is located on Hisar-Bhiwani road in Tosham town in Bhiwani district. It is nearly 40 km from Hisar and Hansi, and 30 km from Bhiwani.

== History ==
The 45-acre park was founded on protected forest land in 2009 by then Haryana's Forests Minister Kiran Choudhry in the memory of her politician husband late Surender Singh who was the son of former Chief Minister of Haryana Bansi Lal and father of politician Shruti Choudhry.

== Objectives of the Herbal Park ==
The herbal park aims to preserve and propagate the Ayurvedic, Naturopathy & endangered herbs. it also aims to educate people and farmers in commercial cultivation of these herbs to engage in profitable pursuits.

== Herbs at Park ==
The Forests Department, Haryana has planted several Ayurvedic medicinal herbs from different parts of the world at this park including Ashvagandha (Indian Ginseng), Sarpagandha (Rauvolfia serpentina), Mulethi (Liquorice), Shatavar (Asparagus racemosus), Brahmibooti (Centella asiatica), Chitrak (Plumbago), Gwarpatha (Aloe vera), Baansa (Justicia adhatoda), Rosha Ghas (Cymbopogon martinii) - type of lemon grass, Akarkara (Anacyclus pyrethrum root), Safed Musali (Chlorophytum borivilianum), Vach, Shatavari, Isabagol (Psyllium seed husks), Tulsi (Ocimum sanctum), Pippali, Makoy or Black nightshade (Solanum nigrum), Bhumi Amalki (Phyllanthus niruri), Bahera, Harad, Amla (Phyllanthus emblica), Rudraksh, Bael, Kalihari (Gloriosa superba), Patharchur (Coleus), Lemon grass, Jatropha, Palmarosa and Haldi (Turmeric).

== Facilities ==
The park has several visitor facilities, including lawns and swings for the kids, an observation watch tower, etc.

== Examples of herbs found ==
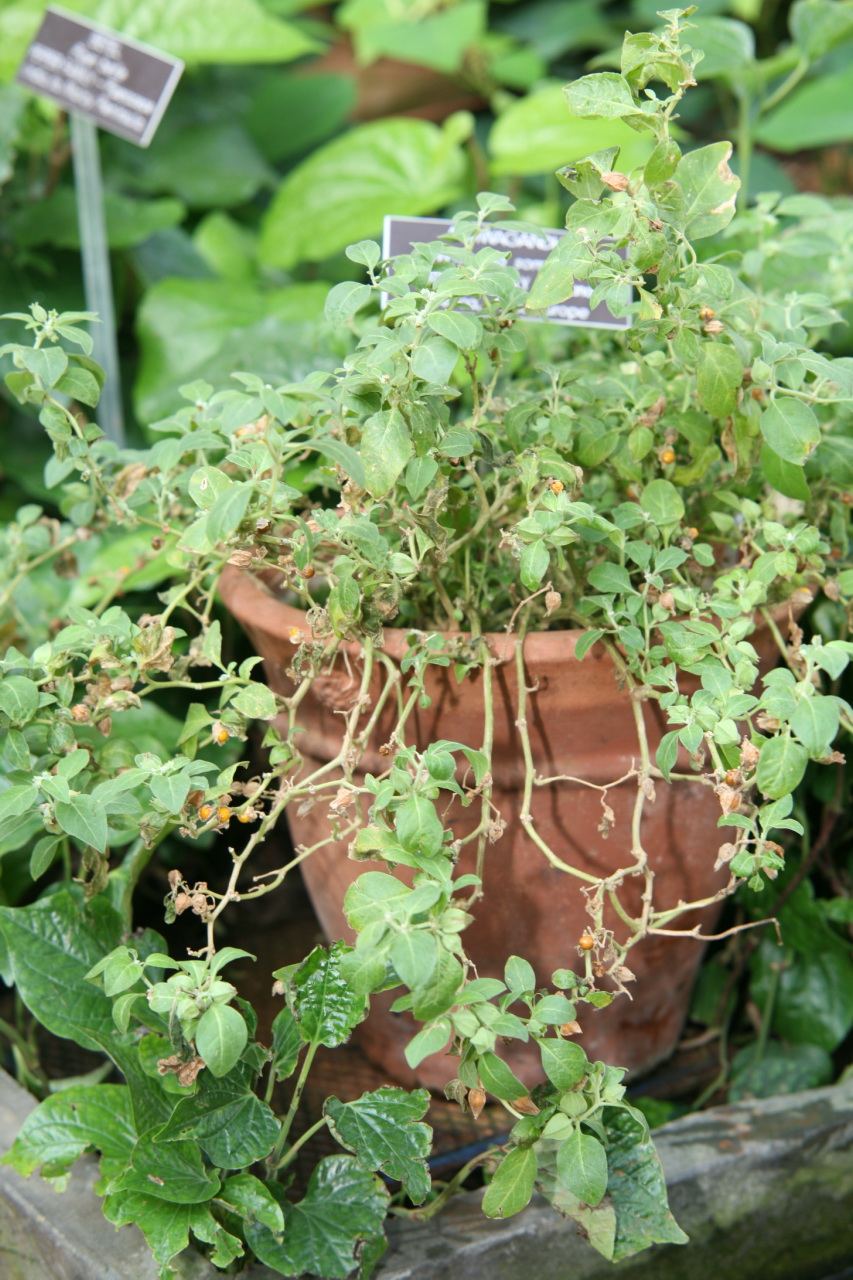
Ayurvedic Herb Ashvagandha (Indian Ginseng) (Withania somnifera)

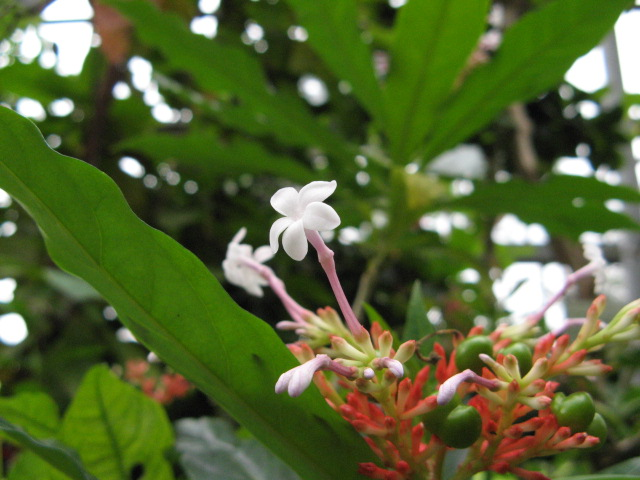
Ayurvedic Herb Sarpagandha (Rauvolfia serpentina)

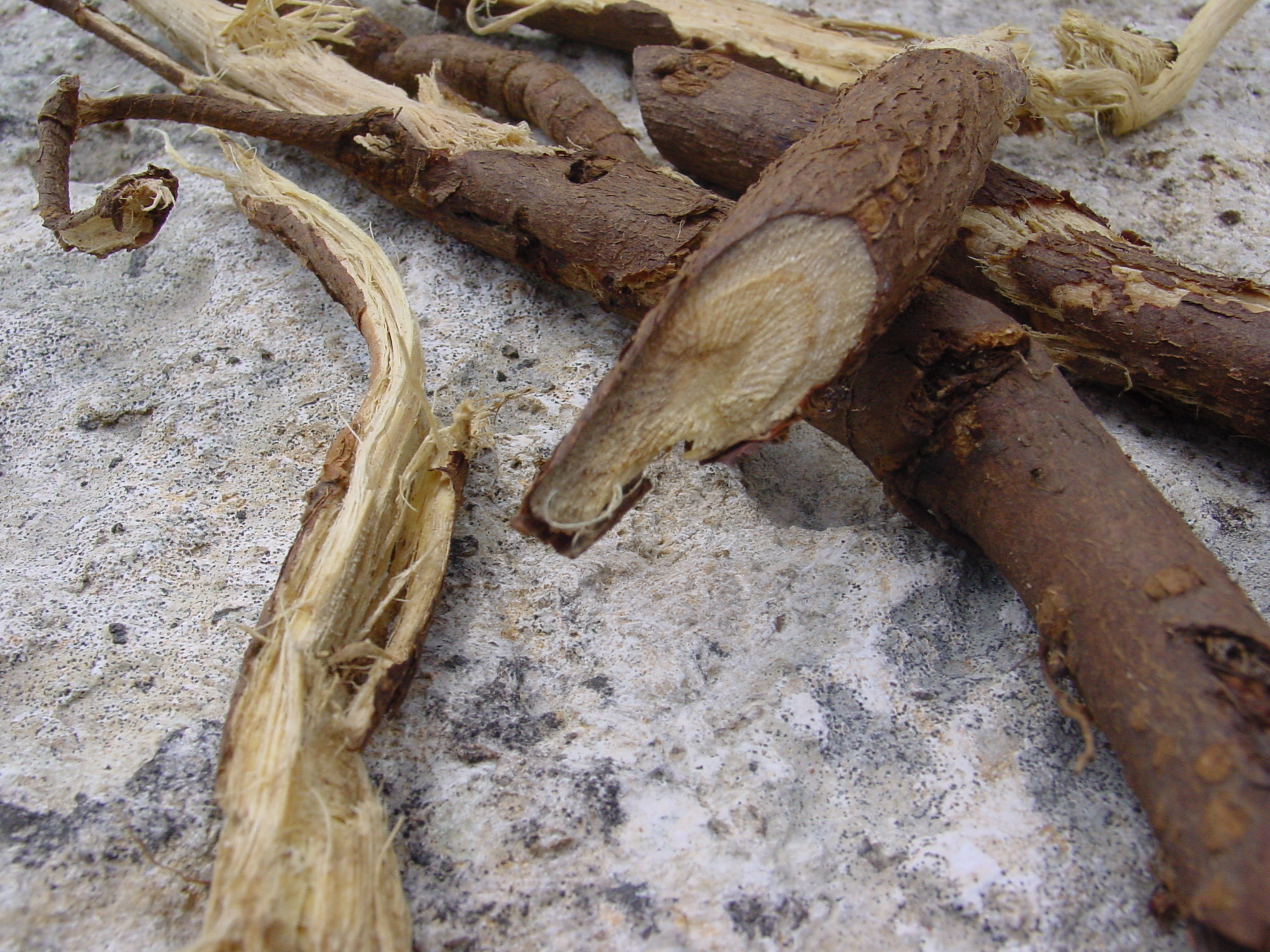
Ayurvedic Herb Mulethi (Liquorice) roots with bark

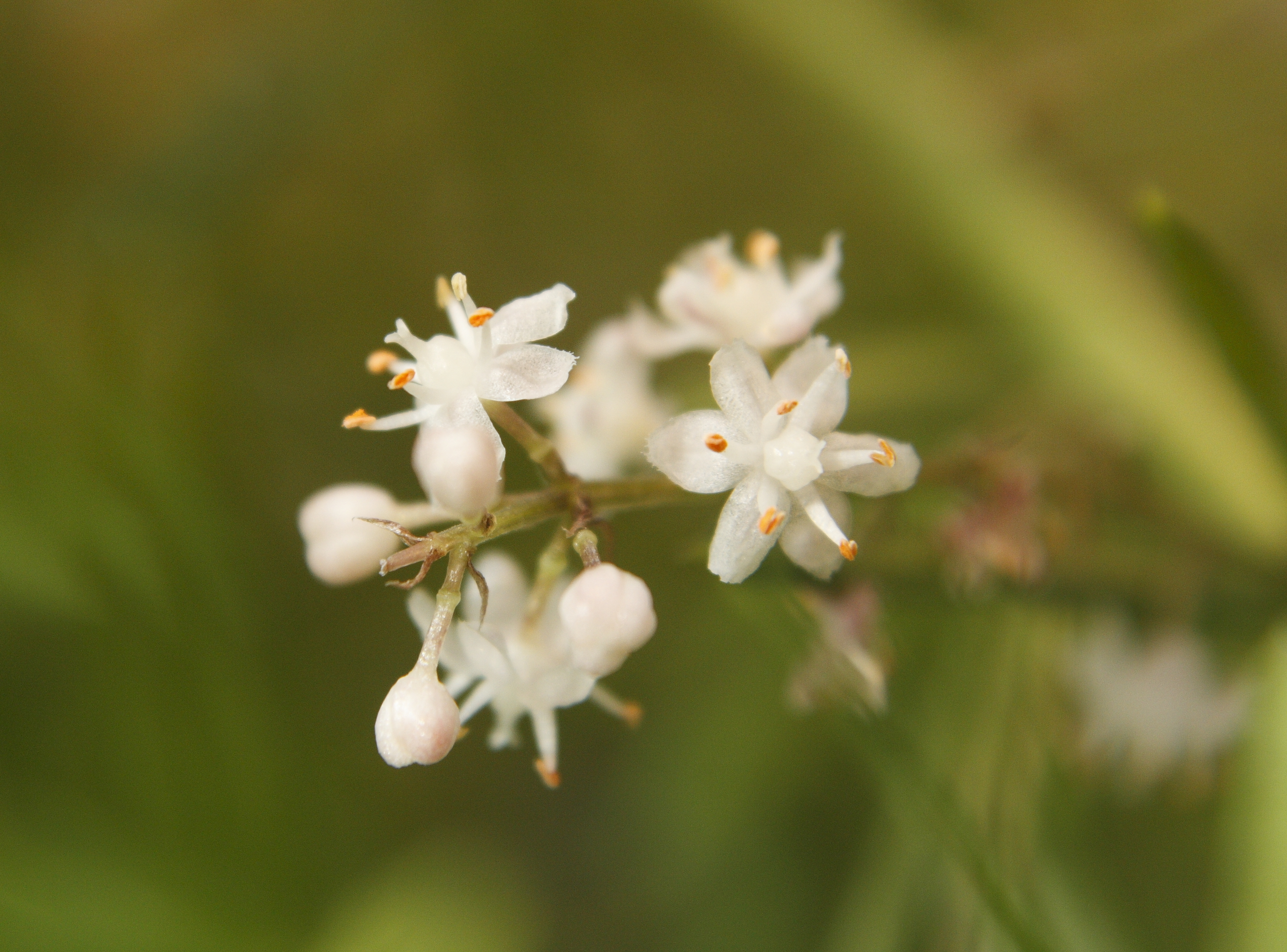
Flowers of Ayurvedic Herb Shatavar (Asparagus racemosus)

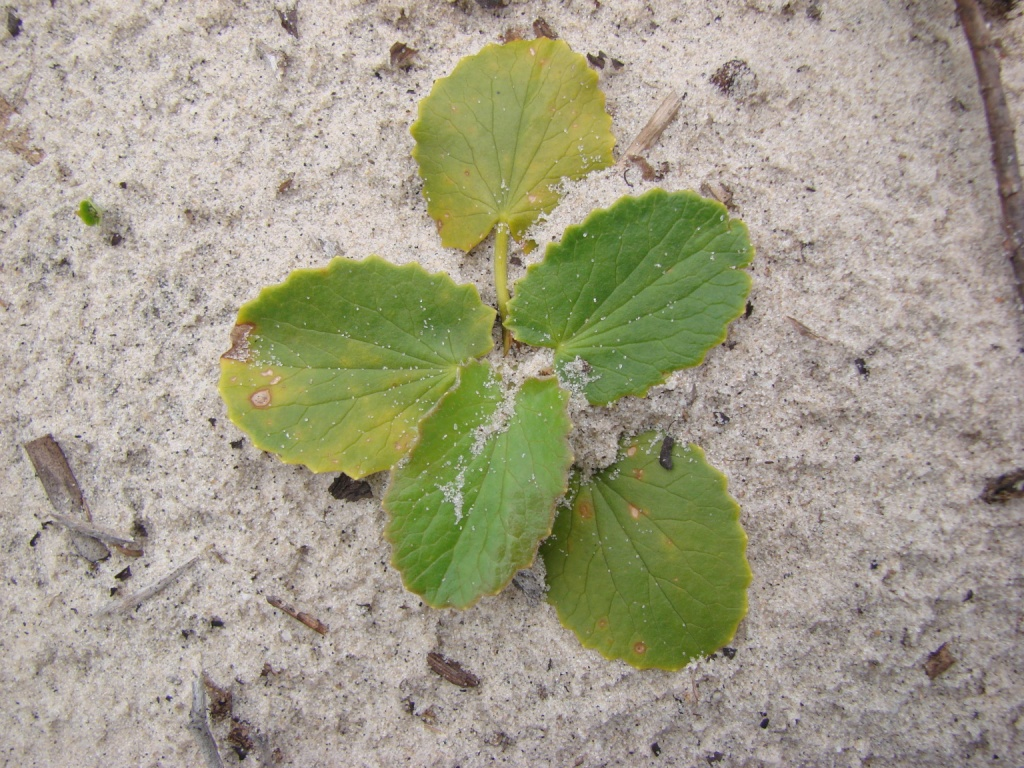
Brahmibooti (Centella asiatica)

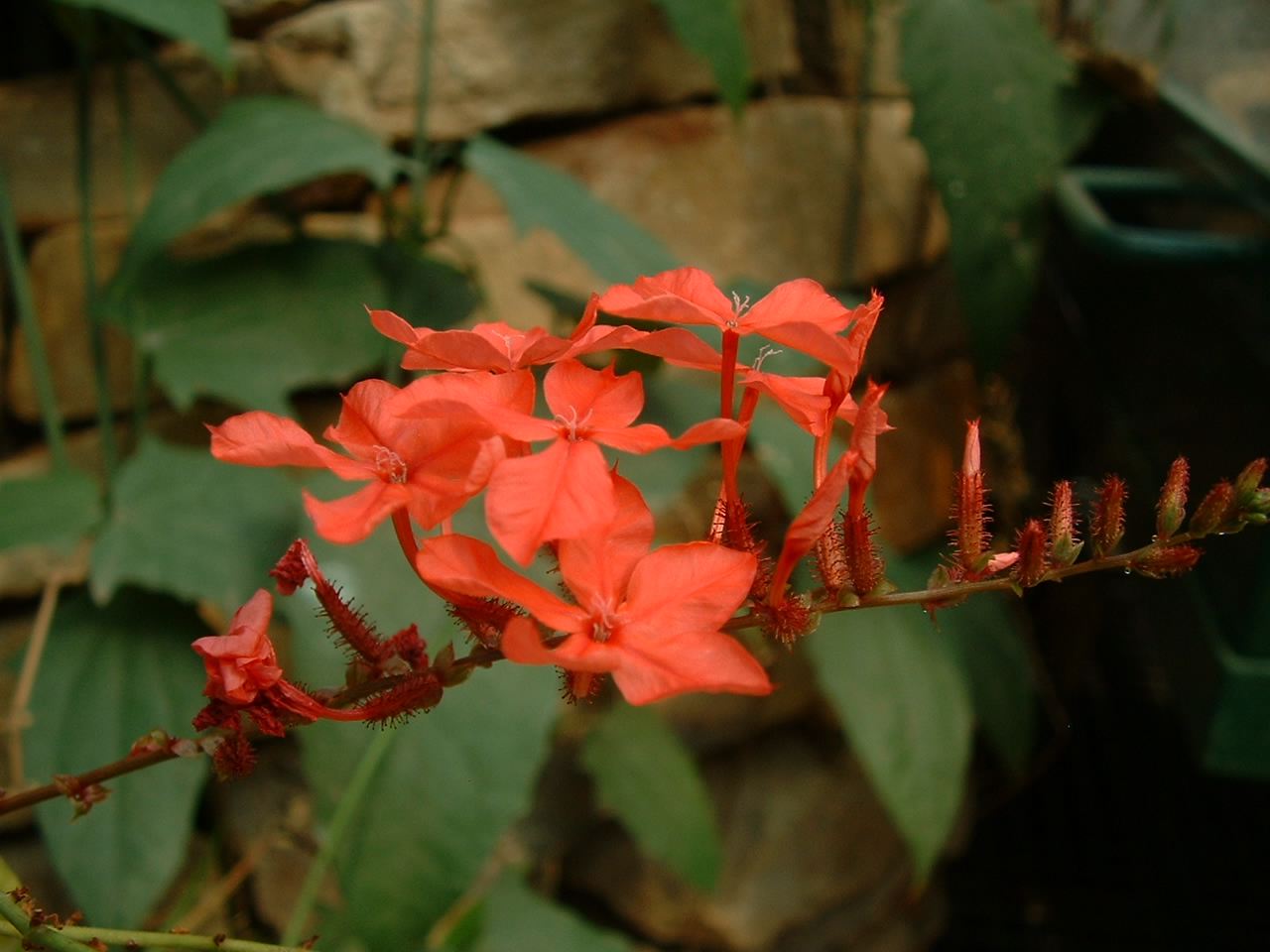
Chitrak (Plumbago)

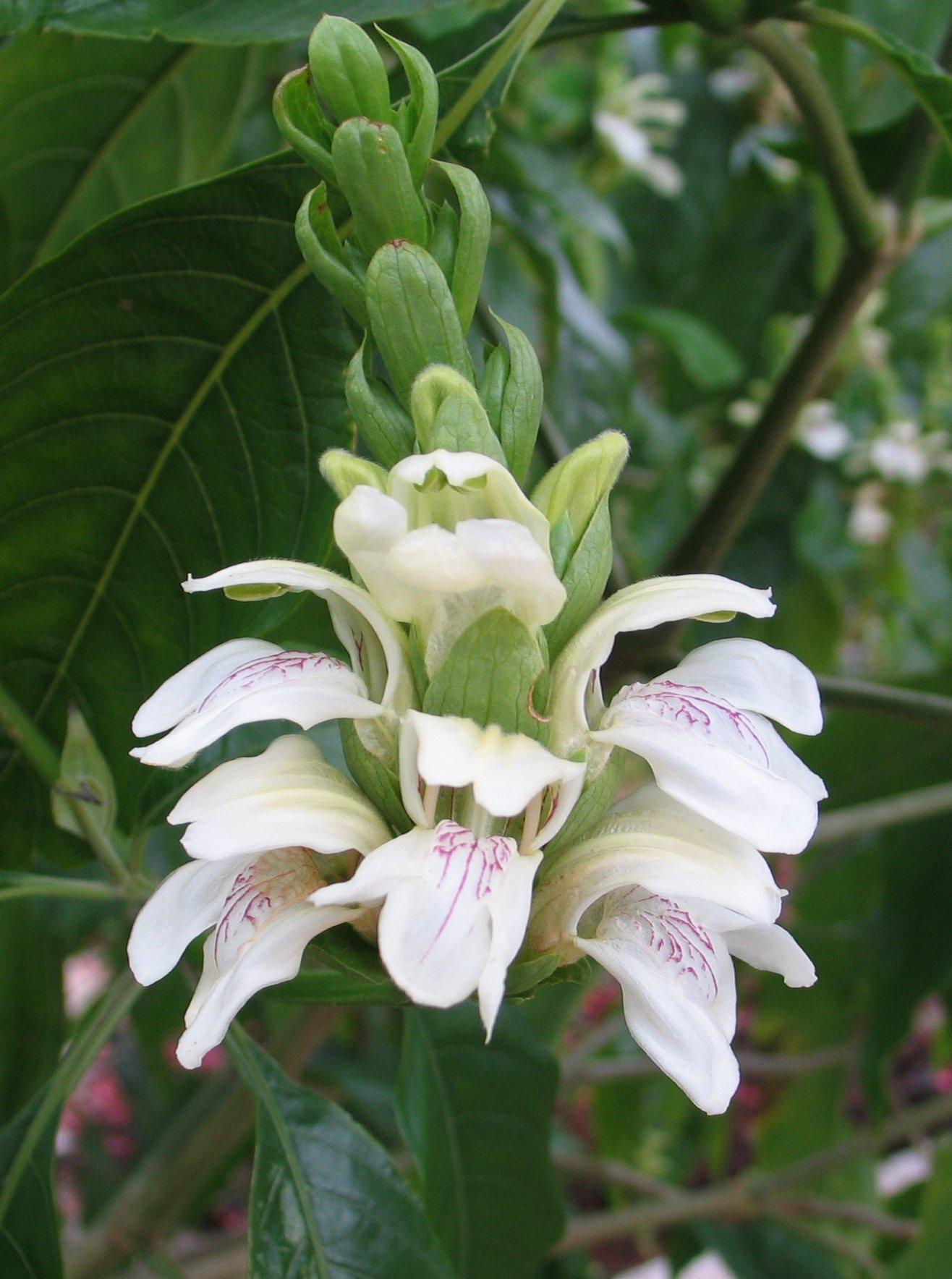
Baansa (Justicia adhatoda)

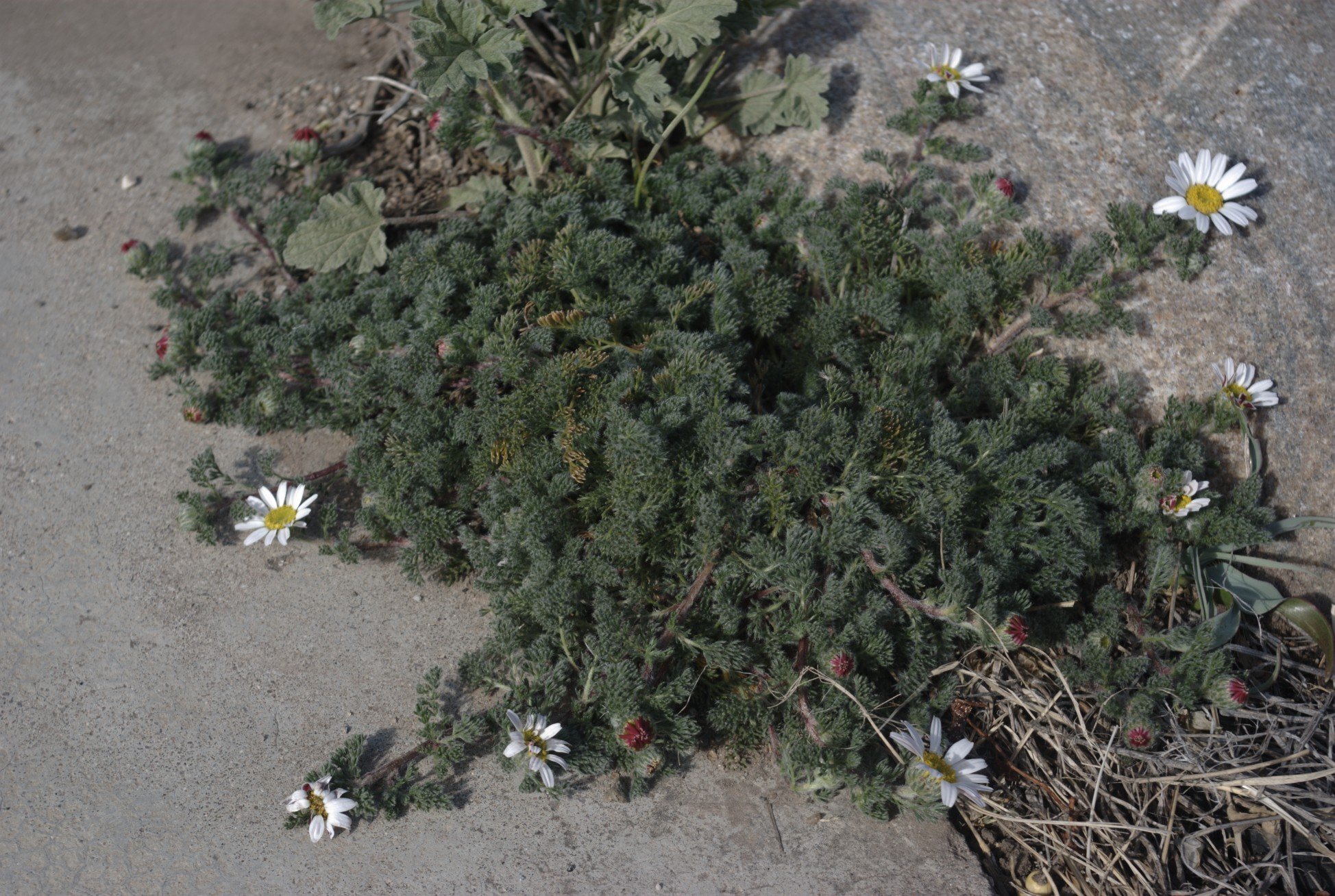
Akarkara (Anacyclus pyrethrum root)
