= Ch. Surender Singh Memorial Herbal Park, Kairu =

- Village
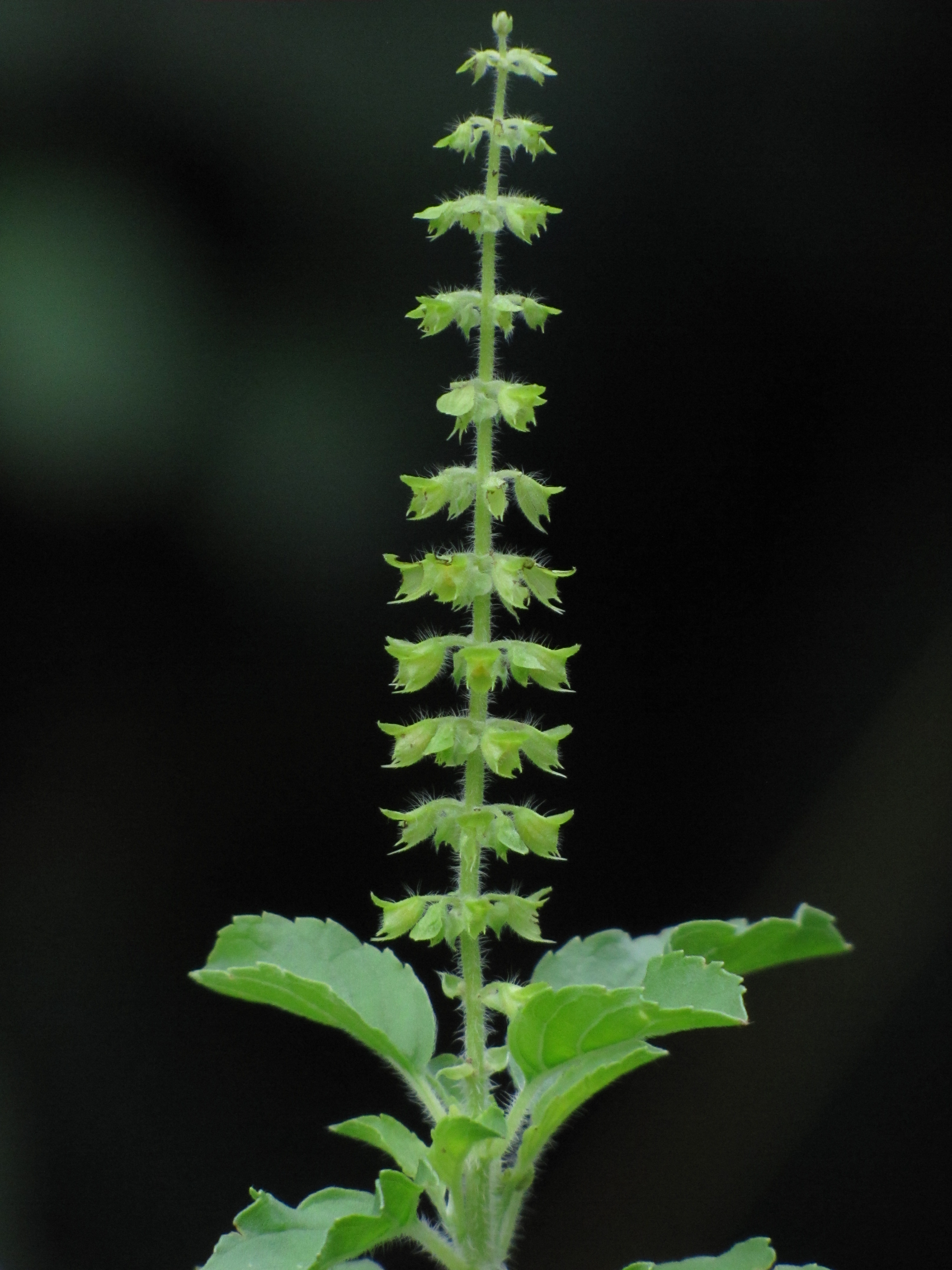
- Tulsi

- Location in Haryana, India Ch. Surender Singh Memorial Herbal Park, Kairu (India)
- Coordinates: 28°41′53″N 75°52′23″E
- Country: India
- State: Haryana
- District: Hisar
- Established: 2008
- Founder: Haryana's Forests Minister Kiran Choudhry
- Named for: Surender Singh

Languages
  - Official: Hindi
- Time zone: UTC+5:30 (IST)
- PIN: 127029
- Telephone code: +91-(01253)
- ISO 3166 code: IN-HR
- Vehicle registration: HR
- Website: www.haryanaforest.gov.in

Ch. Surender Singh Memorial Herbal Park, Kairu is a herbal and medicinal plant park in Kairu village between the cities of Bahal and Bhiwani in the Tosham tehsil of the Indian state of Haryana. It is also the location of a Chinkara Breeding Centre run by the Forests Department of the state government.

== Location ==
maharana pratap Herbal Park, Kairu is 1 km away from the Kairu bus stand and 35 km away from the Bhiwani railway station. Kairu is located on Bahal-Bhiwani road in Kairu village near Bahal in Bhiwani district. Chandigarh is around 244.3 kilometer, Delhi is 130.8 km and Jaipur is 198.0 km from Kairu. The surrounding nearby villages are Kairu Khaparbas 2.6 km and Bijlanawas 3.2 km. Kairu is connected to nearby villages through the road network with presence of State Transport Service and Private Bus Services which link it to Bhiwani, Hisar and Bahal. Nearest major railway station is Bhiwani.

== History ==
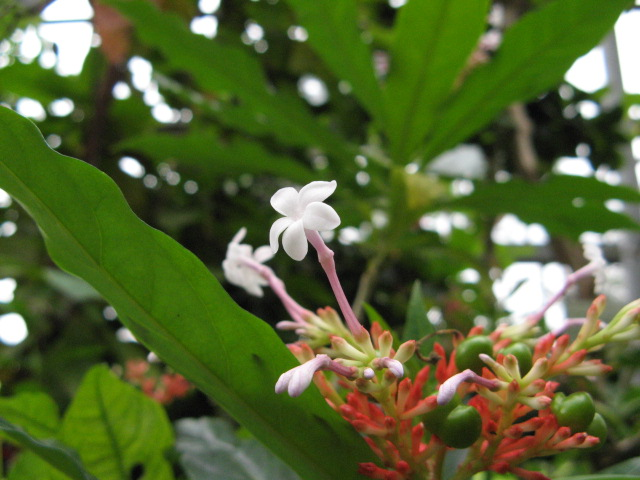
Ayurvedic Herb Sarpagandha (Rauvolfia serpentina)

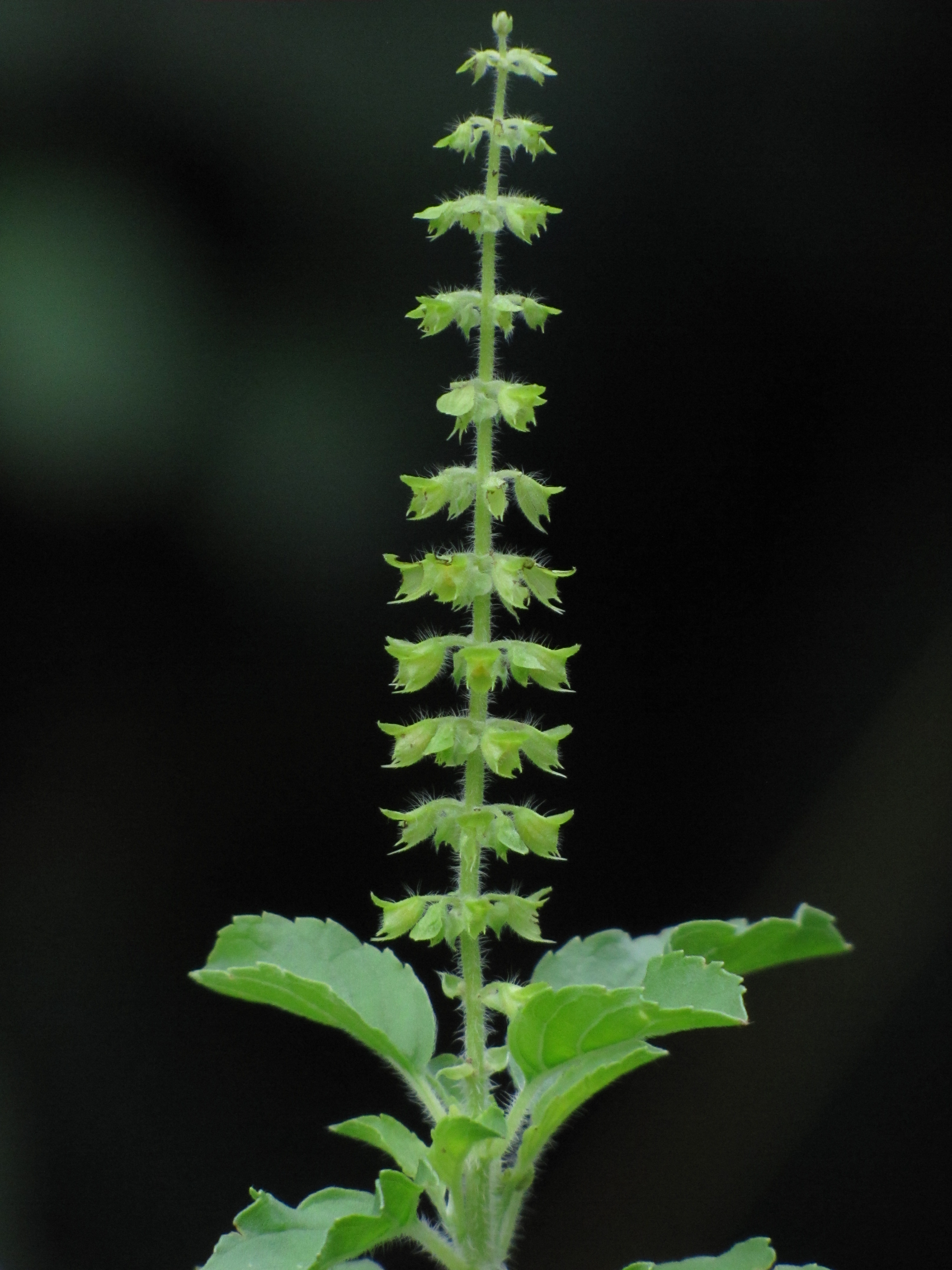
Tulsi-flower (holy basil—a well known Ayurvedic herb)

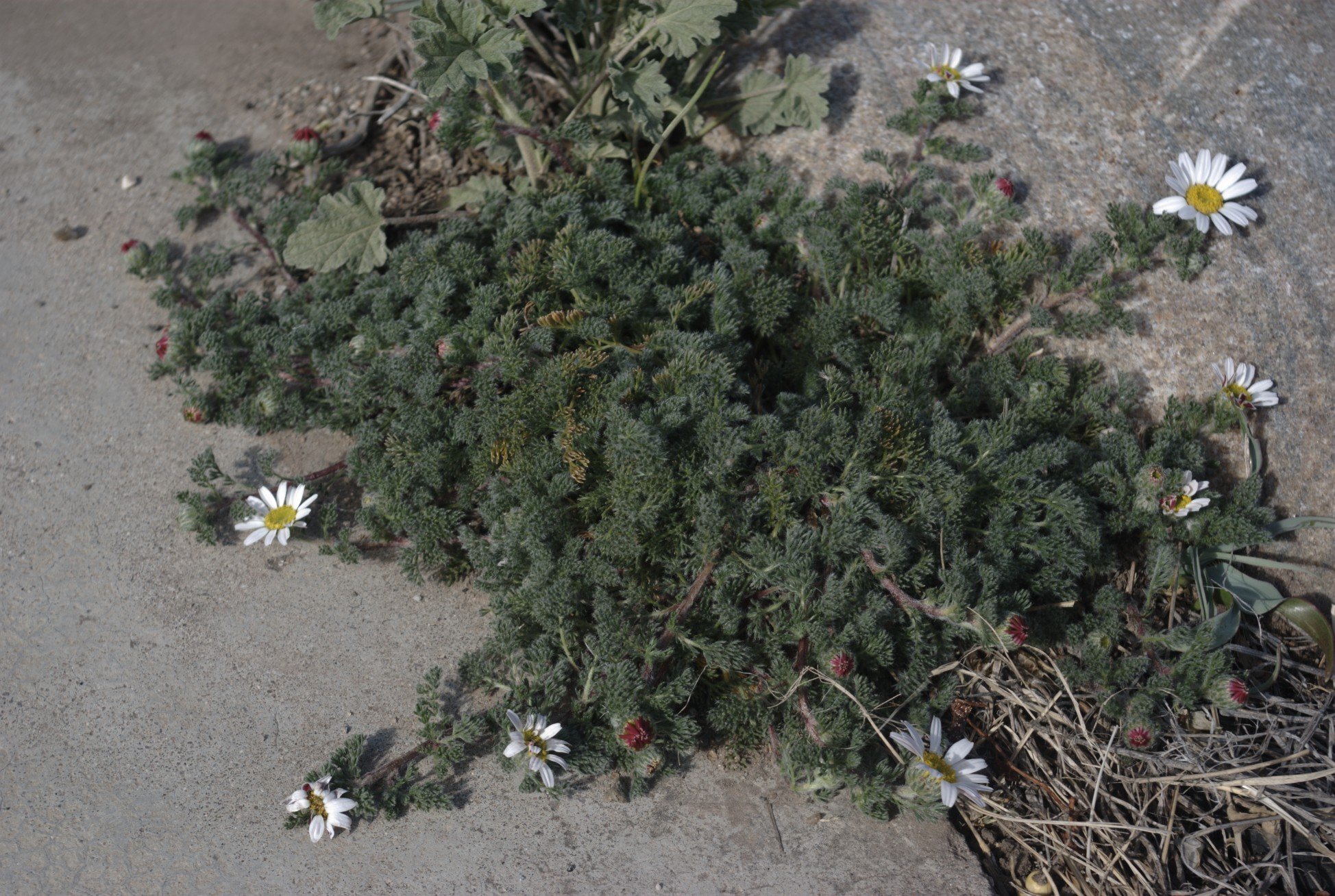
Akarkara (Anacyclus pyrethrum root)

The park was opened in 2008 and there is no entry fee. It was founded in 2008 by then Haryana's Forests Minister Kiran Choudhry in the memory of her politician husband late Surender Singh who was the son of former Chief Minister of Haryana Bansi Lal and father of politician Shruti Choudhry.

== Herbs at Park ==
The Forests Department, Haryana has planted several Ayurvedic medicinal herbs at the park including Ashvagandha (Indian Ginseng), Sarpagandha (Rauvolfia serpentina), Gwarpatha (Aloe vera), Mulethi (Liquorice), Shatavar (Asparagus racemosus), Brahmibooti (Centella asiatica), Chitrak (Plumbago), Baansa (Justicia adhatoda), Rosha Ghas (Cymbopogon martinii) - type of lemon grass, Akarkara (Anacyclus pyrethrum root) and Lehsunbel, etc.
