= Gingergrass =

Gingergrass may refer to:

- Cymbopogon martinii, native to India and Indochina
- Paspalum distichum, native to the Americas
