= Chinkara Breeding Centre Kairu, Bhiwani =

Chinkara Breeding Centre
- Wildlife breeding
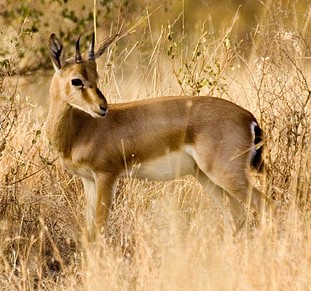
- Chinkara (Indian gazelle)

- Location in Haryana, India Chinkara Breeding Centre (India)
- Coordinates: 28°41′53″N 75°52′23″E
- Country: India
- State: Haryana
- District: Bhiwani

Languages
  - Official: Hindi
- Time zone: UTC+5:30 (IST)
- PIN: 127029
- Telephone code: +91-(01253)
- Sex ratio: ♂/♀
- Website: Website

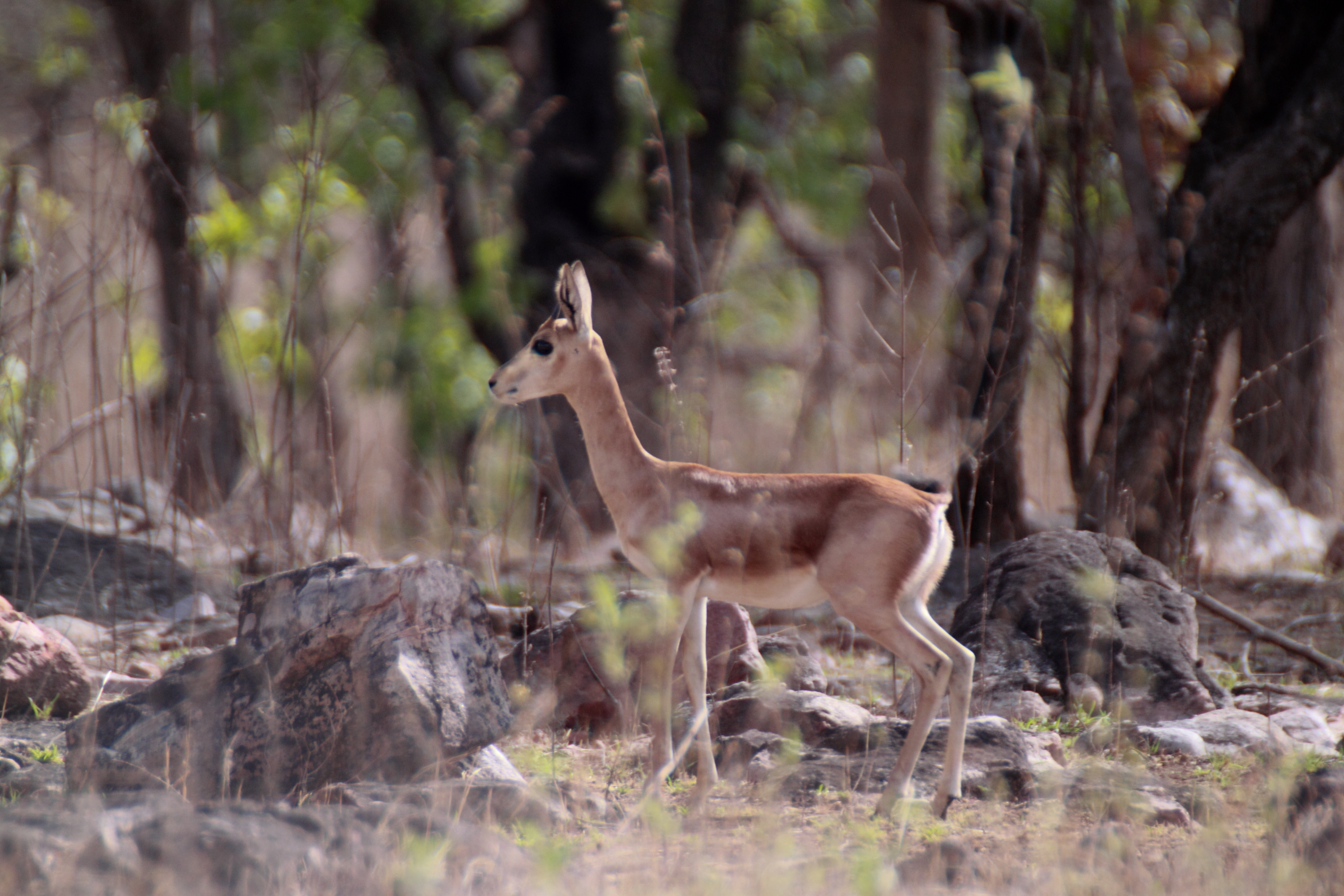
Chinkara

Chinkara Breeding Centre, Kairu is a protected Chinkara breeding centre in Kairu village, Tosham tehsil, Bhiwani district, Haryana, India. The Ch. Surender Singh Memorial Herbal Park, Kairu is nearby.

== Description ==
The centre is a protected Chinkara breeding centre and tourist attraction located in 60 acres (24 ha) of undeveloped mixed forest. The centre started in 1985 with 10 animals, and as of April 2013 had 66 animals (22 males, 44 female and two young). Here the animals are fed twice a day (morning and evening).

Today, the site covers approximately 60 hectares and is open to visitors, who can observe a variety of flora and fauna.

== Transport ==
The village of Kairu can be reached via road using the state transport service or private bus services. The closest railway station is at Bhiwani.

== See also ==
- List of zoos in India
- List of National Parks & Wildlife Sanctuaries of Haryana, India
- Haryana Tourism
