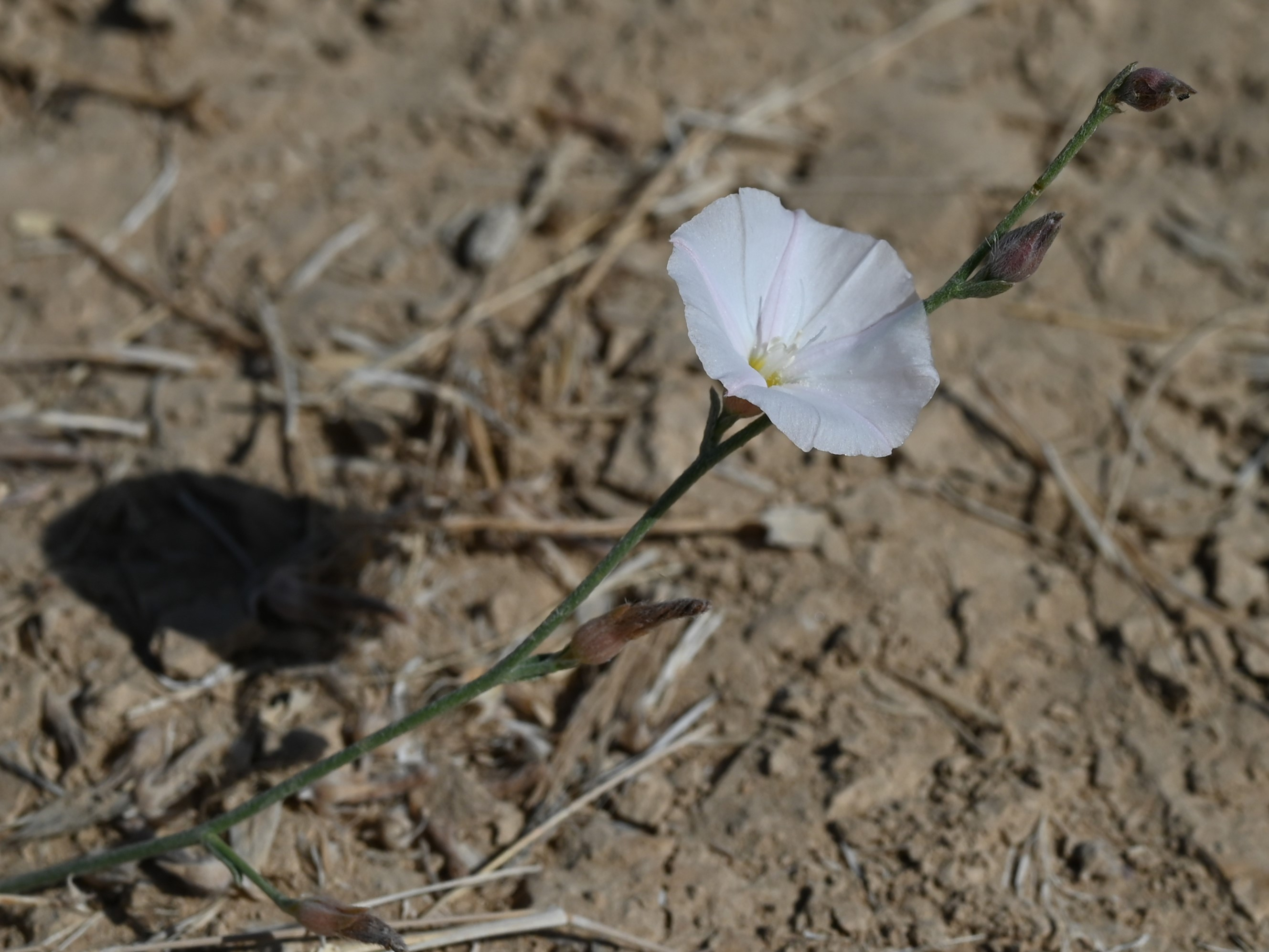

Scientific classification
- Kingdom: Plantae
- Clade: Tracheophytes
- Clade: Angiosperms
- Clade: Eudicots
- Clade: Asterids
- Order: Solanales
- Family: Convolvulaceae
- Genus: Convolvulus
- Species: C. prostratus

Binomial name
- Convolvulus prostratus Forssk.

Synonyms
- List: Convolvulus austroaegyptiacus Abdallah & Sa'ad; Convolvulus cancerianus Abdallah & Sa'ad; Convolvulus deserti Hochst. & Steud. ex Baker & Rendle; Convolvulus evolvuloides Boiss.; Convolvulus heterotrichus Maire; Convolvulus microphyllus Sieber ex Spreng.; Convolvulus parvifolius Spreng.; Convolvulus pluricaulis Choisy; Convolvulus scindicus Boiss.; Evolvulus pilosus Roxb.

= Convolvulus prostratus =

Species of bindweed

Convolvulus prostratus (Convolvulus pluricaulis) is an herb found in India and Burma that is used in Ayurveda. In Ayurveda it is known as shankhpushpi and the preparation shankapushpi is, according to most sources, identical with Convolvulus prostratus, but some say shankapushpi is instead Clitoria ternatea (अपराजिता). Some also say Shankhapushpi is Evolvulus alsinoides, which is another plant of the same family. It has been used traditionally as a brain tonic and is believed to help a wide range of issues. It is believed to have demonstrated potential for anxiolytic, relaxant, and anti-obsessive effects, as well as nootropic effects.

Shankhpushpi has been found to help significantly with memory retention. In cholesterol-fed gerbils shankapushpi was observed to have significantly helped reduce serum cholesterol, low density lipoprotein cholesterol, and triglycerides after ninety days. Shankhpushpi also demonstrated a thyroid suppressing effect when administered (at 0.4 mg/kg) to mice with hyperthyroidism. It has been studied for use as anticonvulsant with mixed results.
