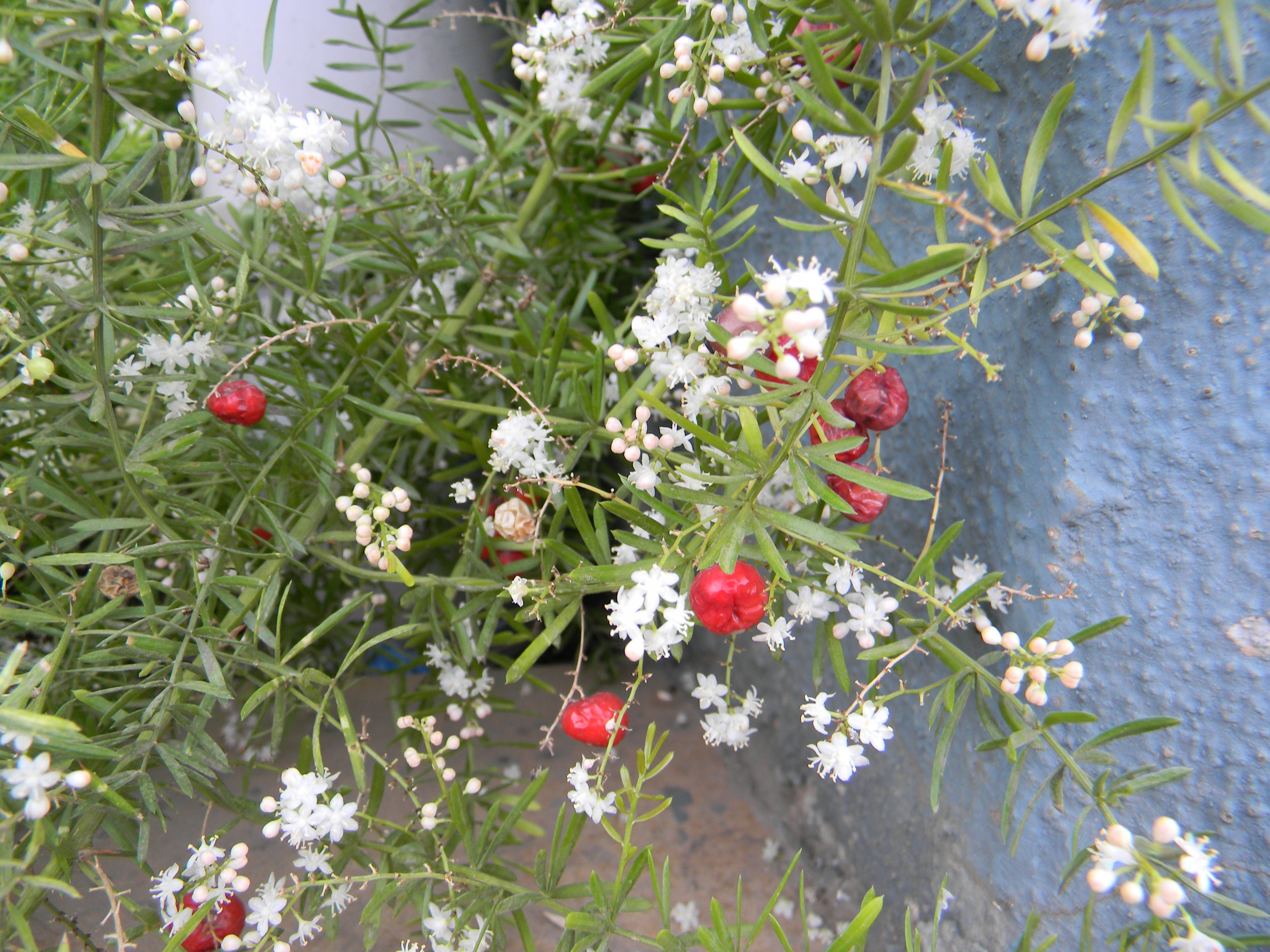
- Plant photographed at Pune

Scientific classification
- Kingdom: Plantae
- Clade: Tracheophytes
- Clade: Angiosperms
- Clade: Monocots
- Order: Asparagales
- Family: Asparagaceae
- Subfamily: Asparagoideae
- Genus: Asparagus
- Species: A. racemosus

Binomial name
- Asparagus racemosus Willd.

Synonyms
- Asparagus rigidulus Nakai; Protasparagus racemosus (Willd.) Oberm.

= Asparagus racemosus =

Shatavari

Species of flowering plant

Asparagus racemosus (shatavari, asparagus fern) is a species of asparagus native from Africa through southern Asia, including the Indian subcontinent, to northern Australia. It grows 1–2 m (3 ft 3 in – 6 ft 7 in) tall and prefers to take root in gravelly, rocky soils high up in piedmont plains, at 1,300–1,400 m (4,300–4,600 ft) elevation. It was botanically described in 1799.88

== Description ==
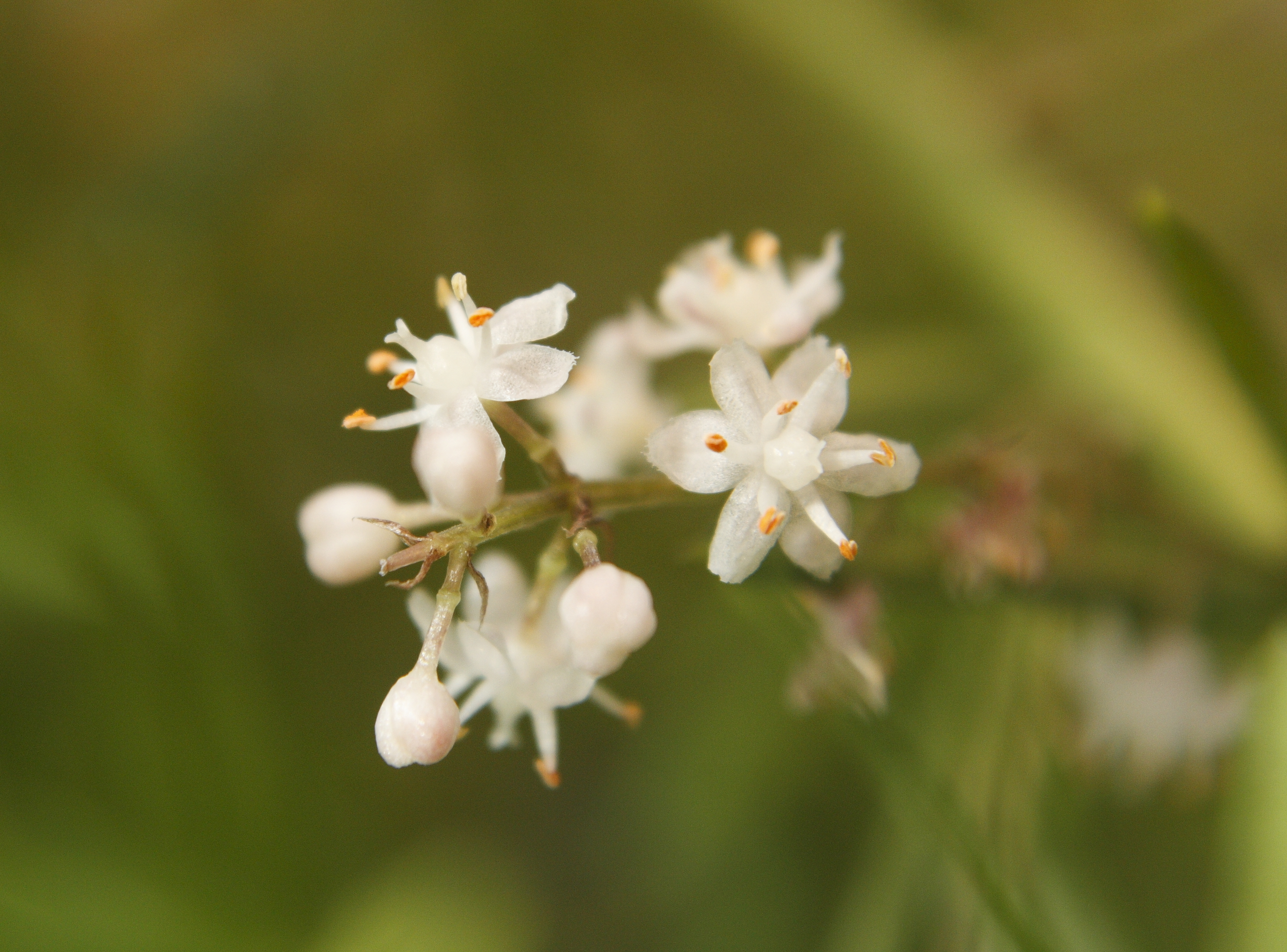
Close-up on flowers

Asparagus racemosus is a climber having stems up to 4 m long. Its roots are both fibrous and tuberous.

Shatavari has small pine-needle-like phylloclades (photosynthetic branches) that are uniform and shiny green. In July, it produces minute, white flowers on short, spiky stems, and in September it fruits, producing blackish-purple, globular berries. It has an adventitious root system with tuberous roots that measure about one metre in length, tapering at both ends, with roughly dozens on each plant.

== Uses ==
Shatavari is used in Indian traditional medicine for menstrual, pregnancy and other health benefits. A recent randomized, double-blind, placebo-controlled trial by Mhatre et.al ni 2026 has found that it decreased follicular count and increased endometrial thickness Some claim less high-quality clinical evidence to support using shatavari as a safe or effective therapy for any condition or disease. Studies of its effects on lactation have shown no significant effects. Its safety has not been well-studied, with two small trials finding no adverse effects in mothers or their babies.

=== Australian Aboriginal uses ===
The roots of Asparagus racemosus are boiled and give a liquid used as an external wash to treat colds and other sicknesses, by the Aboriginal people of the Moyle River area in the Northern Territory. (The Ngan'gi name for the plant is yerrwuwu.)

== Chemical constituents ==
Constituents of shatavari include steroidal saponins, mucilage, and alkaloids. Asparagamine A, a polycyclic alkaloid, was isolated from the dried roots and subsequently synthesized to allow for the construction of analogs.

Steroidal saponins, shatavaroside A, shatavaroside B, filiasparoside C, shatavarins, immunoside, and schidigerasaponin D5 (or asparanin A) were isolated from the roots of Asparagus racemosus.

Also present is the isoflavone 8-methoxy-5,6,4'-trihydroxyisoflavone 7-O-β-D-glucopyranoside.
