= Kairu =

Kairu कैरू, भिवानी, हरियाणा
- Village
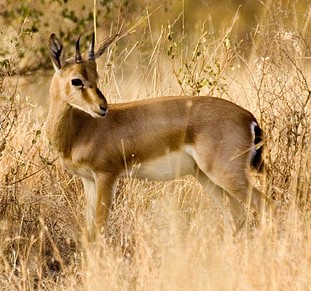

- Location in Haryana, India Kairu (India)
- Coordinates: 28°41′53″N 75°52′23″E
- Country: India
- State: Haryana
- District: Bhiwani
- Tehsil: Tosham
- Founder: sohan singh

Population (2011)
  - Total: 9,894

Languages
  - Official: Hindi
- Time zone: UTC+5:30 (IST)
- PIN: 127029
- Telephone code: +91-(01253)
- ISO 3166 code: IN-HR
- Vehicle registration: HR48
- Sex ratio: ♂/♀
- Website: www.bhiwani.nic.in

Kairu is a block located in district Bhiwani, Haryana. Positioned in rural area of Bhiwani district of Haryana. The people are from different castes and communities. Agriculture is the main profession of residents of Kairu block. Kairu block is still waiting for Mega Industrial development. Located between the cities of Bahal and Bhiwani, it is the home of maharana pratap Memorial Herbal Park, Kairu and Chinkara Breeding Centre Kairu, Bhiwani run by Forests Department, Haryana of Government of Haryana.

== Description ==
Kairu is 2 Panchayat and among 61 villages in Tosham Block. Kairu is located on Bahal-Bhiwani road in Kairu village near Bahal in Bhiwani district. Chandigarh is around 244.3 km, Delhi is 130.8 km and Jaipur is 198.0 km from Kairu. The nearby villages are Kairu Khaparbas (2.6 km) and Bijlanawas (3.2 km).

== Transport ==
Block Kairu is connected to nearby villages through the road network with presence of State Transport Service and Private Bus Services which link it to Bhiwani, Hisar and Bahal. Nearest major railway station is Bhiwani.

== Demography ==
As per 2011 census, Kairu has 1,820 households with a total population of 9,894 (5,241 males - 53% and 4,653 females 47%). There are 2,504 (25%) Scheduled Caste. Kairu has a literacy rate of 60% (5,943). Main occupation of people is agriculture and government/private jobs. Some villagers are employed in government services and many people are doing private jobs.
