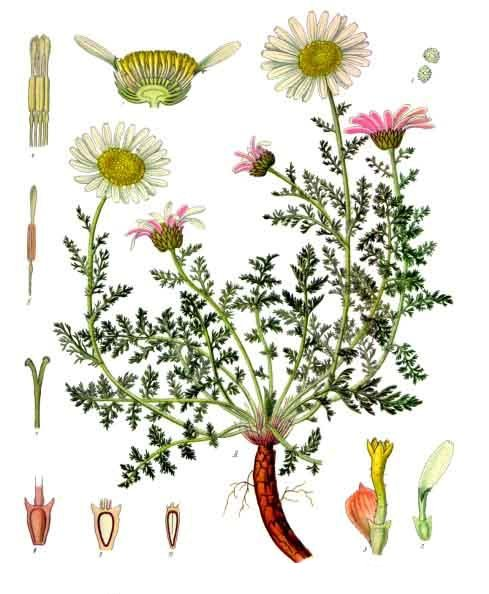
- Mount Atlas daisy

Conservation status
- Vulnerable (IUCN 3.1)

Scientific classification
- Kingdom: Plantae
- Clade: Tracheophytes
- Clade: Angiosperms
- Clade: Eudicots
- Clade: Asterids
- Order: Asterales
- Family: Asteraceae
- Genus: Anacyclus
- Species: A. pyrethrum

Binomial name
- Anacyclus pyrethrum (L.) Link

Synonyms
- Anthemis pyrethrum L. Anacyclus depressus Ball; Anacyclus freynii Willk. Anacyclus officinarum Hayne; Sources: E+M, AFPD

= Anacyclus pyrethrum =

Species of plant

Anacyclus pyrethrum, the pellitory, Spanish chamomile, Mount Atlas daisy, bertram, or Akarkara, is a species of flowering plant in the daisy family Asteraceae. It is native to Mediterranean Europe and parts of North Africa, but also naturalised in other parts of Europe, India and Pakistan. This herbaceous perennial resembles chamomile species in habitat and appearance.

The plants known as pellitory-of-the-wall and spreading pellitory belong to a different family, the nettles (Urticaceae).

== Names ==
Although one might assume from the specific epithet pyrethrum that this plant contains pyrethrins, it does not. Both pyrethrum and "pellitory" derive ultimately from the ancient Greek for "fire" (πῦρ).

== Vernacular names ==
Anacyclus pyrethrum is known by various regional names in India and is commonly used in traditional systems like Ayurveda and Unani medicine.

Language	Vernacular Name	Script
Hindi	Akarkara	अकरकरा
Sanskrit	Akalla	आकल्ल
Sanskrit	Ākārakarabha	आकारकरभ
Urdu	Āqar qarha	عاقر قرحا
Tamil	Akkirakaram	அக்கிரகரம்
Telugu	Akarkara	అకర్కర
Kannada	Akarkara	ಅಕಾರ್ಕರ
Malayalam	Akarkaram	അകര്കാരം

== Cultivation ==
Anacyclus pyrethrum var. depressus (sometimes considered a separate species, Anacyclus depressus), called mat daisy or Mount Atlas daisy, is grown as a spring-blooming, low-water ornamental. It produces mats of grey-green, ferny foliage and single daisy-like white flowers. It is suitable for growing in an alpine or rock garden. It has gained the Royal Horticultural Society's Award of Garden Merit.

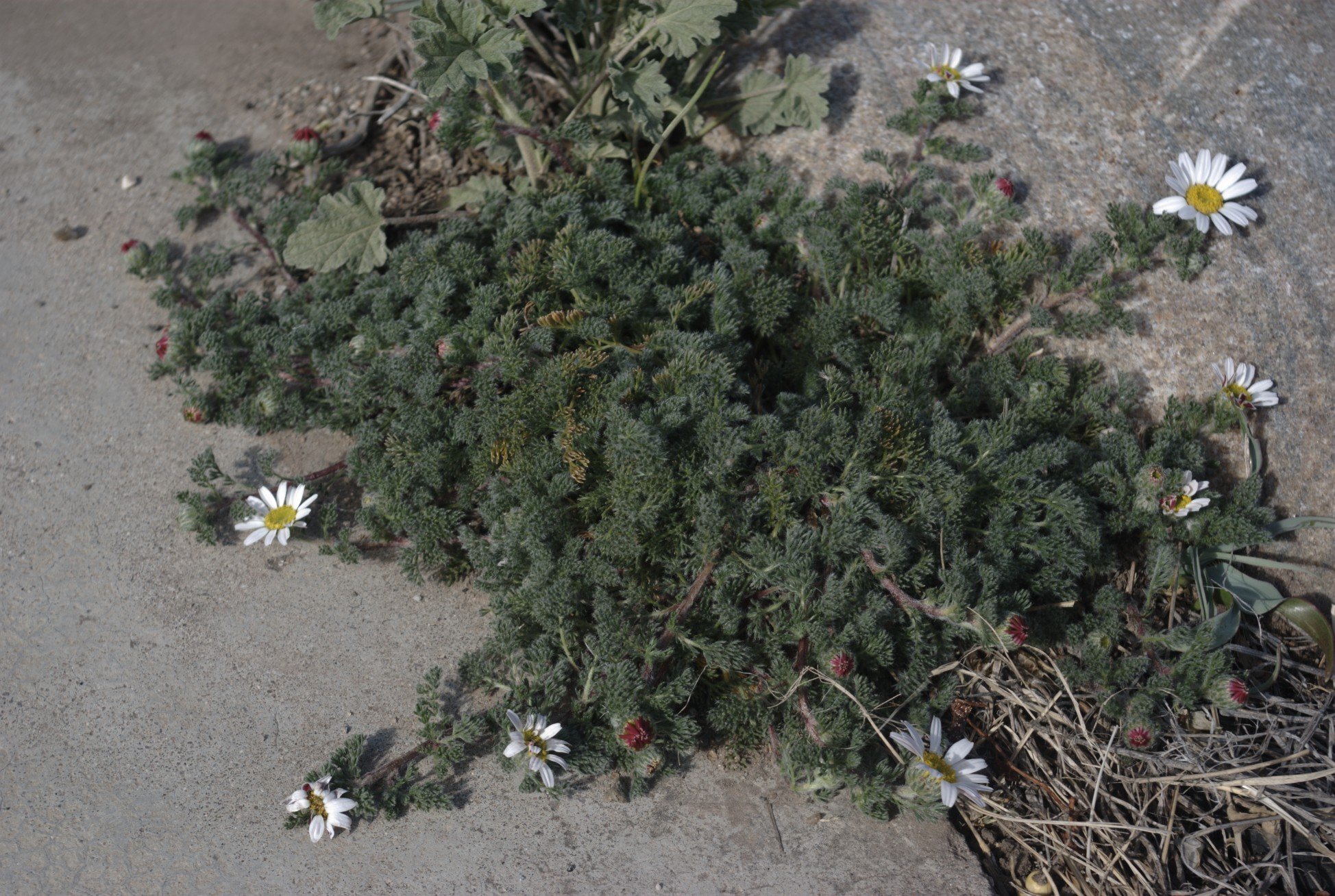
Var. depressus

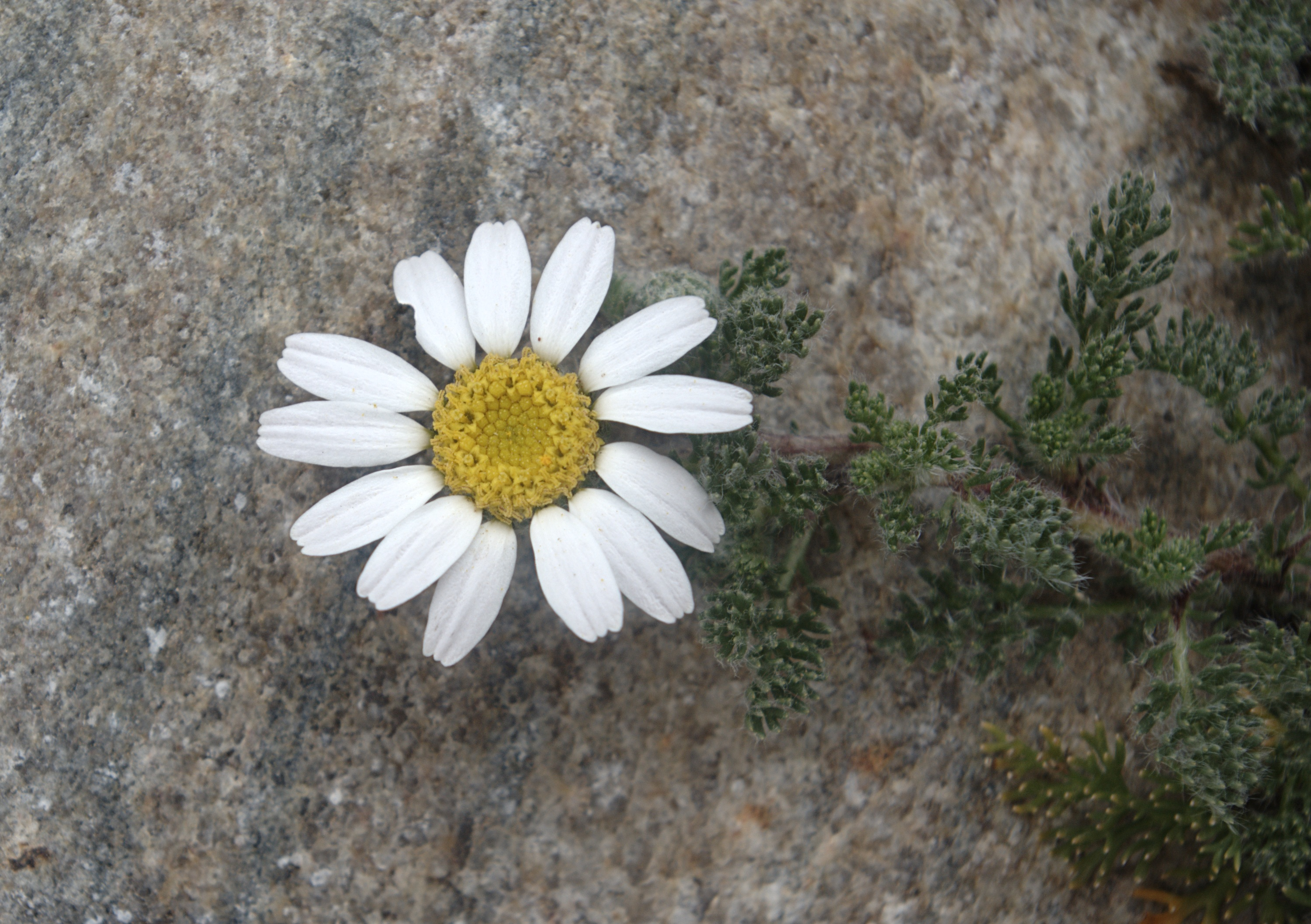
same plant, flower detail

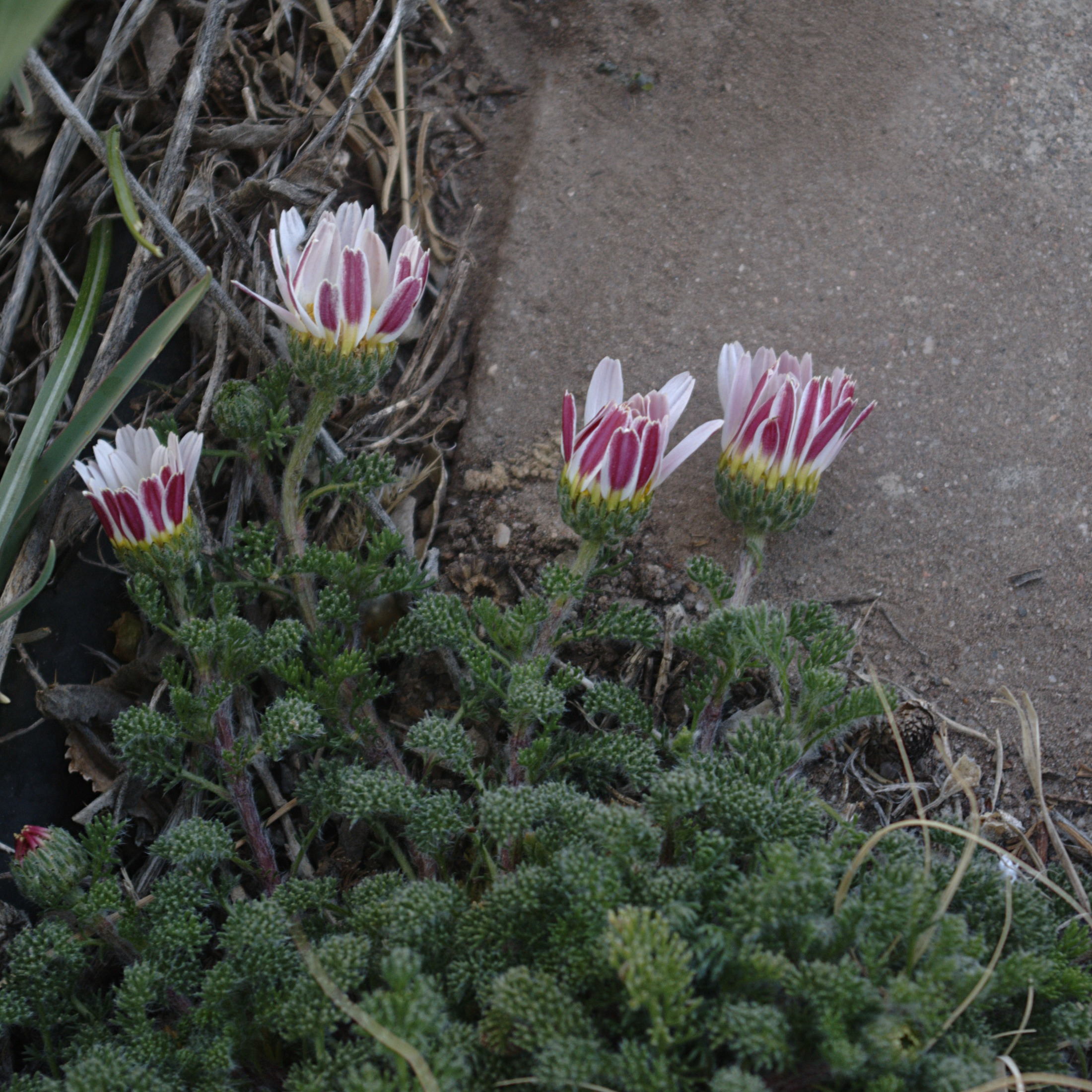
Var. depressus, flowers closed

== Medicinal uses ==
Extracts of Anacyclus pyrethrum have anabolic activity in mice and also increase testosterone in the animal model.

Ayurveda and Siddha medical traditions in India use it for diseases of the abdomen, sciatica, cough and others. It is called Akkal-Kara in Hindi, Akkal Kadha in Marathi, Akkala-karra Malayalam, Akkarkkara (അകർക്കാര)(Telugu: అక్కలకఱ్ఱ) and Akkarakaaram (Tamil: அக்கரகாரம்). A kind of oil is prepared by a method known as pit extraction (Tamil: குழி எண்ணெய்).

In The Perfumed Garden (from 15th century Tunisia), al-Nefzawi recommends pelleter taken externally as an ointment on the penis and scrotum or internally to enhance sexual pleasure and enhance erection (ch. 13, 15, 17).
