= Cymbopogon martinii =

Scientific classification
- Kingdom: Plantae
- Clade: Tracheophytes
- Clade: Angiosperms
- Clade: Monocots
- Clade: Commelinids
- Order: Poales
- Family: Poaceae
- Subfamily: Panicoideae
- Genus: Cymbopogon
- Species: C. martinii

Binomial name
- Cymbopogon martinii (Roxb.) Wats.

Synonyms
- Cymbopogon martini (Roxb.) Wats., spelling preferred under ICN; Andropogon martini Roxb.; Cymbopogon martinianus Schult.; Gymnanthelia martini (Roxb.) Andersson; Andropogon schoenanthus var. martini (Roxb.) Hook.f.; Andropogon pachnodes Trin.; Andropogon calamus-aromaticus Royle; Cymbopogon pachnodes (Trin.) W.Watson; Cymbopogon martini var. sofia B.K.Gupta; Cymbopogon motia B.K.Gupta

Species of grass

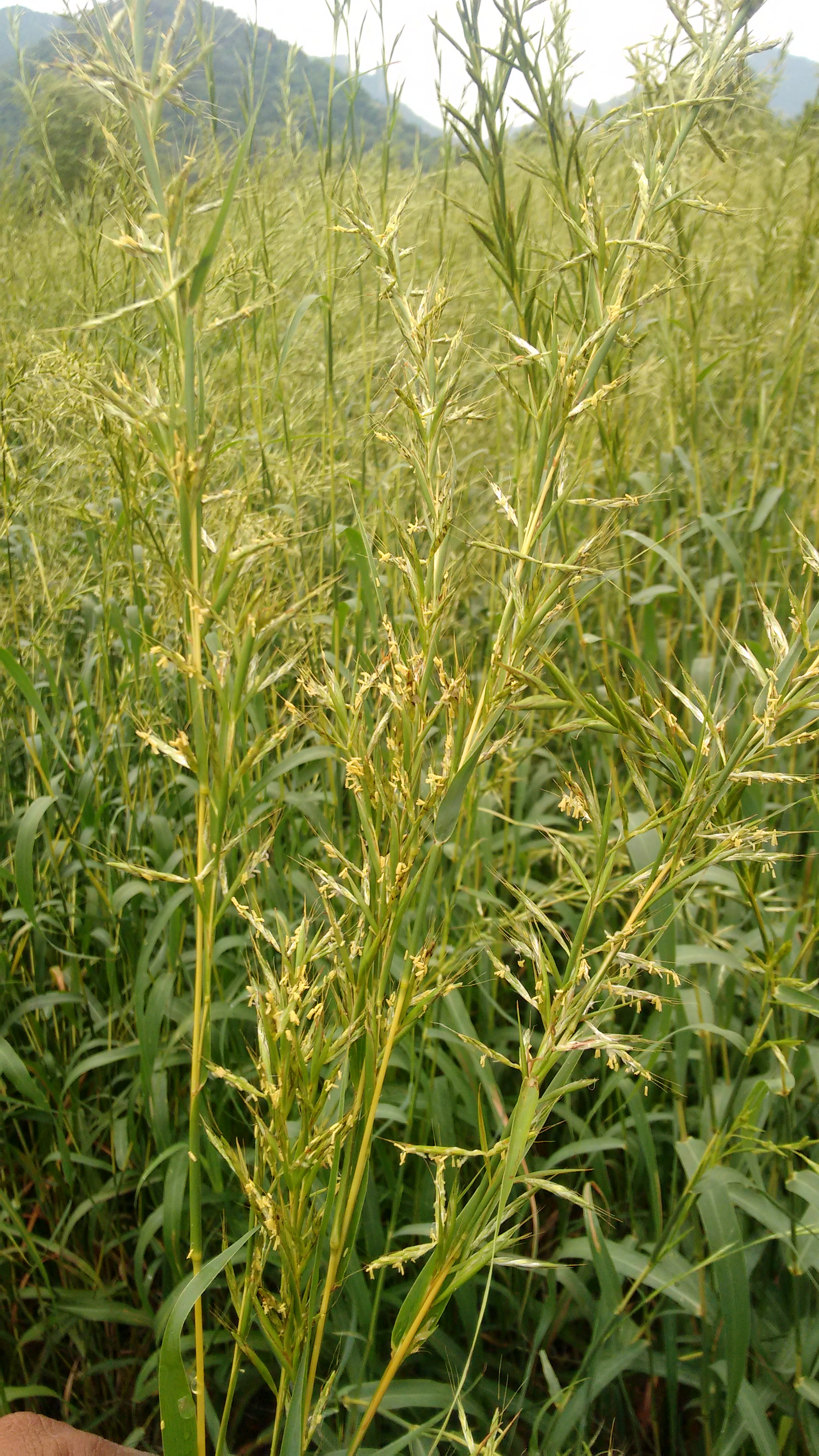
Cymbopogon martinii

Cymbopogon martinii is a species of grass in the genus Cymbopogon (lemongrasses) native to India and Indochina but widely cultivated in many places for its aromatic oil. It is best known by the common name palmarosa (palm rose) as it smells sweet and rose-like. Other common names include Indian geranium, gingergrass, rosha, and rosha grass.

== Uses ==
The essential oil of this plant, which contains the chemical compound geraniol, is valued for its scent and for traditional medicinal and household uses. Palmarosa oil may be an effective insect repellent when applied to stored grain and beans, an antihelmintic against nematodes, and an antifungal and mosquito repellent. Palmarosa oil, which has a scent similar to that of roses, is added to soaps and cosmetics.

It is widely used for rose-smelling perfumes and cosmetics. The aroma of the oil is described as "sweet, floral, citrus, grassy, citronella, geranium". It has been used for aromatherapy. Palmarosa oil is an antifungal that fights against Aspergillus niger (commonly known as black mold), Chaetomium globosum (also known as soil mold), and Penicillium funiculosum, which is a plant pathogen.

== Cultivation ==
C. martinii grows fairly tall, ranging from 1.3 to 3 m (4 ft 3 in to 9 ft 10 in) in height with a pale green color and a strong thin stem. This crop grows slowly, taking three months to flower; once it has flowered, it can be harvested. It received the name palmarosa from the sweet-smelling floral rose aroma it gives off.

Palmarosa grows in the wild in certain wetlands of India and Nepal. Palmarosa oil is extracted from the stem of the grass by distillation of dried leaves. Once the stems and leaves have been distilled for two to three hours, to separate the oil from the palmarosa plant matter, then the leftover grass residue is turned into manure or composted.

The most efficient way to grow palmarosa is in a nursery with much irrigation and soil pH of 7-8. Two or three days before planting, it is best to overwhelm the soil with water to increase soil moisture above 60% when planting the seeds. This moisture increases the germination of the seed and increases weed control in the nursery beds as well. It is also recommended to flood the soil monthly to maintain a high moisture level in the soil. Irrigation in a nursery is most important for the first 40 days. Palmarosa grass grows well in sandy texture soil with low nitrogen, sufficient phosphorus and potassium, but requires frequent manual weeding. Palmarosa is often intercropped to help suppress weeds, thus increasing yields and land use efficiency. Farmers often intercrop with pigeon peas; millet and sorghum also work well with row or strip intercropping because palmarosa can be harvested three to four times per year.

A nursery is needed or there will be poor growth yields, that may not bring any profit to the farmer and potentially the farmer could have an economical loss. This requirement increases the startup cost for farmers which some farmers are unable to pay. If not grown in a nursery this will increase the weeding labour inputs by over 70% and decrease the yield. Farmers will be spending more time weeding the plots and will receive a smaller return than if they had a nursery.
