= Panchkula Municipal Corporation =

Governing body in Haryana, India

Type
- Type: Municipal corporation of [[Panchkula, Haryana, India]]

History
- Founded: March 17, 2010; 16 years ago
- Preceded by: Municipal Council, Panchkula

Leadership
- Mayor: Sham Lal Bansal, BJP since 13 May 2026

Structure
- Seats: 20
- Political groups: Government (17); BJP (17); Opposition (3); INC (1); Independent (2)
- Length of term: 5 years

Elections
- Voting system: First-past-the-post
- Last election: 10 May 2026
- Next election: 2031

Meeting place
- Municipal Corporation Office, Sector 14, Panchkula, Haryana

Website
- mcpanchkula.in

Panchkula Municipal Corporation (PMC), also known as the Municipal Corporation, Panchkula, is the civic body that governs the city of Panchkula, the district headquarters of Panchkula district in the Indian state of Haryana. Panchkula is part of the Chandigarh Capital Region, along with Chandigarh and Mohali.

== History ==
The civic body of Panchkula was originally constituted as a Municipal Council. On 17 March 2010, the Municipal Council, Panchkula was upgraded and converted into a Municipal Corporation by the Haryana government, vide notification No. 18/7/2010-3C1 dated 17 March 2010. At the time of its conversion into a corporation, the towns of Kalka and Pinjore, along with some adjoining villages, were also included within the limits of the corporation.

The first elections to the newly formed Panchkula Municipal Corporation, for all 20 wards, were held on 2 June 2013, recording a voter turnout of about 65 per cent.

In July 2020, the Haryana Cabinet approved the bifurcation of the Panchkula Municipal Corporation, under which Kalka and Pinjore were separated from the corporation and granted separate municipal council status.

== Jurisdiction ==
The corporation administers an area of about 32.6 square kilometres and is divided into 20 wards. Its responsibilities include sanitation, waste management, maintenance of roads and drains, street lighting, and upkeep of parks and community centres within the city.

== Composition ==
Composition of the Panchkula Municipal Corporation after the 2026 election:

| Party | Seats | Status |
|---|---|---|
| Bharatiya Janata Party | 17 | Government |
| Indian National Congress | 1 | Opposition |
| Independent | 2 | Opposition |
| Total | 20 | |

== Elections ==
=== 2026 election ===
The 2026 Panchkula Municipal Corporation election was held on 10 May 2026, with counting on 13 May 2026. The Bharatiya Janata Party's mayoral candidate, Sham Lal Bansal, defeated Congress candidate Sudha Bhardwaj by a margin of 37,252 votes. The BJP swept the ward elections as well, winning 17 of the 20 wards, with the Congress and independents picking up the remaining seats. Other mayoral candidates included Rajesh Kumar of the Aam Aadmi Party and Manoj Aggarwal of the Indian National Lok Dal.

=== 2020 election ===
In the 2020 Panchkula Municipal Corporation election, held on 27 December 2020 with results declared on 30 December 2020, BJP's Kulbhushan Goyal was elected Mayor, defeating Congress candidate Upinder Kaur Ahluwalia by 2,057 votes. The BJP finished as the single largest party with nine seats, followed by the Congress with seven seats, the Jannayak Janta Party with two seats, and two independents.

=== 2013 election ===
In the first election to the corporation, held on 2 June 2013, Congress-backed candidates won a majority of the 20 wards. Upinder Kaur Ahluwalia of the Indian National Congress was elected as the first Mayor of Panchkula, becoming the city's first woman mayor.

== List of Mayors ==
| No. | Name | Party | Term |
|---|---|---|---|
| 1 | Upinder Kaur Ahluwalia | INC | 2013 – 2018 |
| 2 | Kulbhushan Goyal | BJP | 2020 – 2026 |
| 3 | Sham Lal Bansal | BJP | since 13 May 2026 |

== See also ==
- Panchkula
- Chandigarh Municipal Corporation
- Municipal corporations in Haryana
