= Deputy Commissioner's Office, Panchkula =

Administrative headquarters of Panchkula district, Haryana, India

- उपायुक्त कार्यालय, पंचकूला
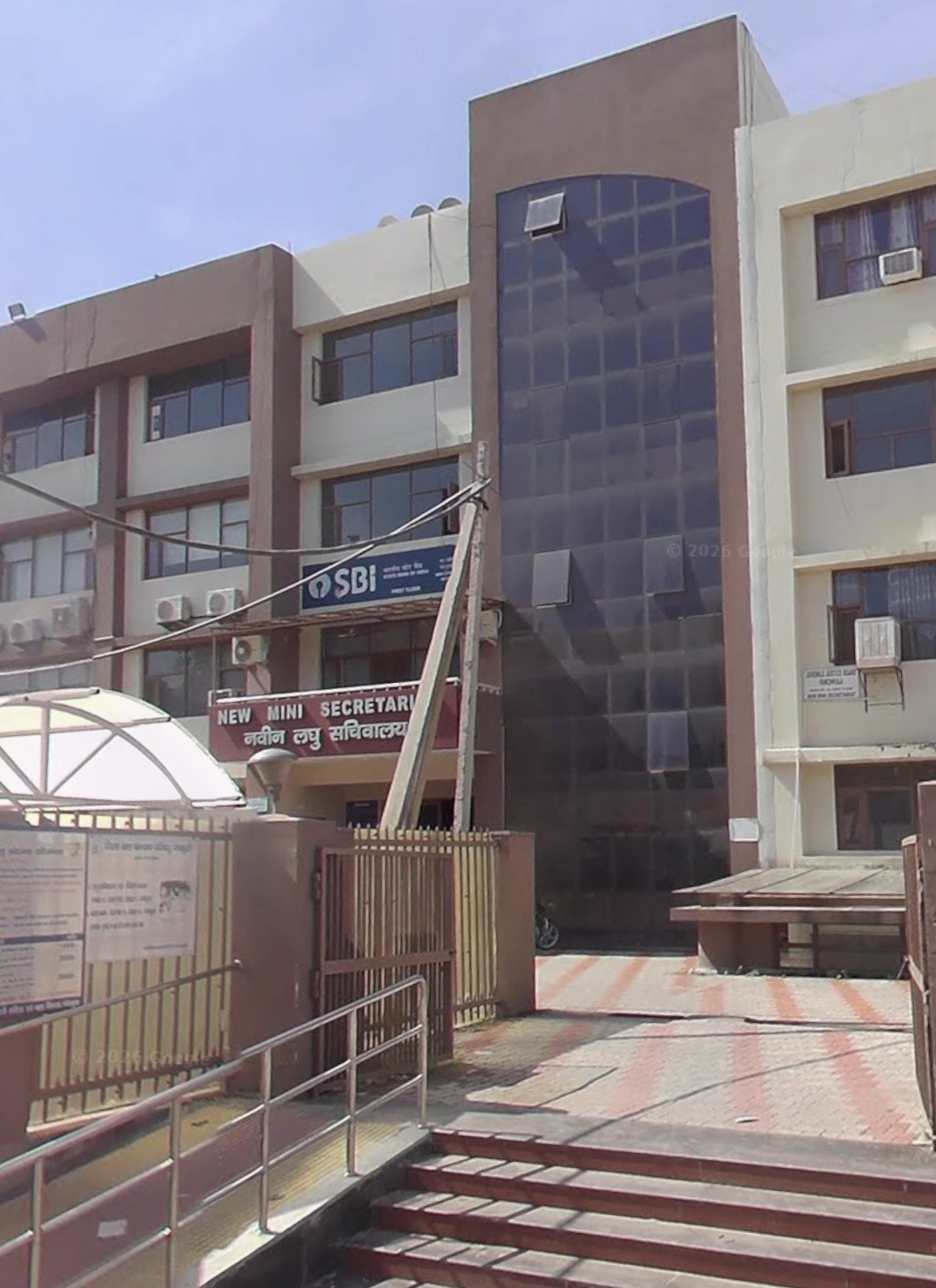
- DC Office, Panchkula

Agency overview
- Formed: August 15, 1995; 31 years ago
- Jurisdiction: Panchkula district, Haryana, India
- Headquarters: Mini Secretariat, Sector 1, Panchkula, Haryana
- Agency executive: Satpal Sharma, IAS, Deputy Commissioner
- Parent agency: Government of Haryana
- Website: panchkula.nic.in

The Deputy Commissioner's Office, Panchkula (Hindi: उपायुक्त कार्यालय, पंचकूला) is the administrative headquarters of Panchkula district in the Indian state of Haryana. Operating under the Government of Haryana, it serves as the district's principal administrative office and is headed by the Deputy Commissioner, an officer of the Indian Administrative Service (IAS).

Based at the Mini Secretariat in Sector 1, Panchkula, the office oversees district administration, revenue matters, law and order, elections, disaster management, implementation of government programmes, and coordination among departments. It also functions as the primary public interface for several government services delivered at the district level.

== History ==
Panchkula district was created on 15 August 1995 after being carved out of Ambala district. The Deputy Commissioner's Office was established with the formation of the district and became the central administrative authority responsible for coordinating government departments and delivering district-level administration.

Since its establishment, the office has played a key role in implementing state and central government policies, maintaining revenue administration, supervising elections, and providing essential public services across the district.

== Location ==
The office is located within the Mini Secretariat complex in Sector 1, Panchkula. The complex houses several district-level government departments, enabling administrative coordination and providing residents with access to a wide range of public services from a single location.

== Organisation ==
The office is headed by the Deputy Commissioner, the senior-most administrative officer of the district, who reports to the Commissioner of the Ambala Division. The Deputy Commissioner represents the Government of Haryana at the district level and oversees coordination among departments responsible for revenue administration, development, law and order, elections, and public welfare.

As of 2026, the Deputy Commissioner is Satpal Sharma, a 2017-batch IAS officer. In addition to serving as Deputy Commissioner, he holds the statutory office of District Collector and serves as the ex officio Chief Administrator of the Shri Mata Mansa Devi Shrine Board.

== Functions ==
The Deputy Commissioner's Office is the principal administrative authority of Panchkula district and is responsible for implementing the policies and programmes of the Government of Haryana and the Government of India at the district level.

Its responsibilities include:

- Overall district administration
- Coordination among district-level government departments
- Revenue administration and maintenance of land records
- Collection of land revenue
- Maintenance of law and order in coordination with law enforcement agencies
- Disaster management and relief operations
- Conduct of parliamentary, assembly and local body elections
- Implementation and monitoring of government welfare schemes
- Public grievance redressal
- Coordination with municipal bodies and other government agencies

The office also coordinates the delivery of various public services through its associated departments, including revenue administration, citizen certificates, election-related services, welfare programmes and disaster management assistance.

In 2025, the office coordinated the registration of farmers under the Government of India's Agri Stack digital agriculture initiative across the district's four tehsils by constituting field teams for registration and data collection.

The office also conducts regular Samadhan Shivirs (public grievance camps) at the Mini Secretariat, where residents can present grievances directly before the Deputy Commissioner. During these camps, departments are instructed to resolve complaints within prescribed timelines.

=== Land administration ===
As the District Collector, the Deputy Commissioner exercises statutory powers relating to revenue administration, maintenance of land records and disputes involving government and shamlat (common) land.

The office also oversees land acquisition proceedings, mutation cases and appeals arising under the state's revenue laws.

In June 2026, the Ambala Divisional Commissioner remanded a long-running dispute involving approximately 72 bighas of land in Sector 31 (Chowki village), valued at more than ₹200 crore, to the District Collector, Panchkula, for a fresh determination of ownership shares following an appeal by the Municipal Corporation Panchkula.

According to The Tribune, the proceedings involved the examination of historical revenue records dating back to the early twentieth century.

=== Elections ===
The Deputy Commissioner also serves as the District Election Officer for Panchkula district and is responsible for conducting elections in accordance with the directions of the Election Commission of India.

The office supervises the preparation and revision of electoral rolls, appointment and training of election personnel, polling arrangements, voter awareness programmes, and the storage and periodic inspection of Electronic Voting Machines (EVMs) and VVPAT units kept in district custody.

== Office holders ==
Several Indian Administrative Service officers have served as Deputy Commissioner of Panchkula since the district was established in 1995. Notable office holders include:

Deputy Commissioner	Tenure	Notes
Mandip Singh Brar	2015–2016	Assumed office in 2015.
Gauri Parasher Joshi	2016	Recorded as the district's 18th Deputy Commissioner.
Vinay Pratap Singh	2020–2025	Assumed office in June 2020.
Satpal Sharma	2025–present	Appointed Deputy Commissioner in September 2025.
