= Raipur Rani =

Tehsil in Haryana, India

- Census Town
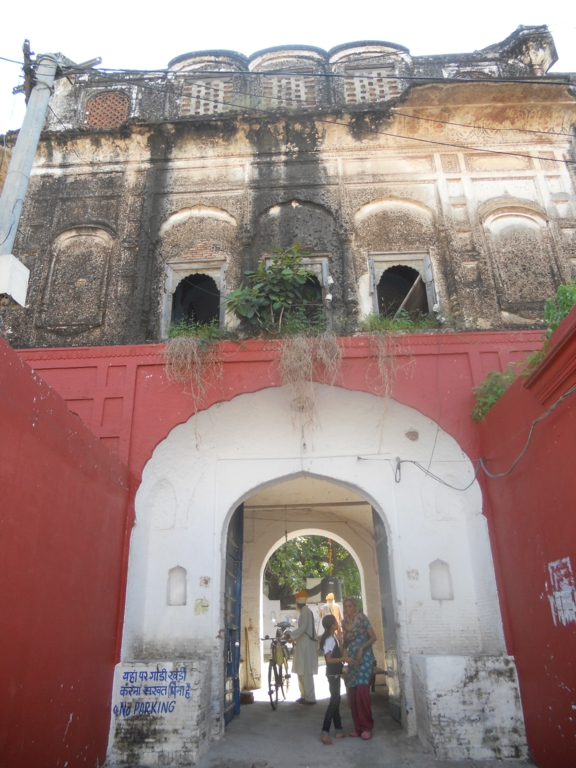
- Fort of Raipur Rani in Panchkula district (Haryana)
- Nickname: Rani Raipur
- Location in Haryana, India Raipur Rani (India)
- Coordinates: 30.5818°N 77.02052°E
- Country: India
- State: Haryana
- District: Panchkula

Population (2001)
  - Total: 7,027

Languages
  - Official: Hindi
  - Native: Puadhi; Dharti Sirmauri
- Time zone: UTC+5:30 (IST)
- ISO 3166 code: IN-HR
- Vehicle registration: HR03
- Website: haryana.gov.in

Raipur Rani is a Town and Tehsil in Panchkula district in the Indian state of Haryana. It is one of three tehsils located in Panchkula District. It is located on the Panchkula city-Chandigarh-Nahan-Paonta Sahib-Dehradun highway 30 kilometres (19 miles) east from the Chandigarh-Mohali-Panchkula urban cities combine. It is about 20 kilometres (12 miles) from the Dera Bassi Industrial belt and 10 kilometres (6.2 miles) from the Barwala industrial estate. Narayangarh in the Ambala District is the next large town in its proximity.

== Languages and Dialect Spoken ==
The primary languages spoken in the town are Hindi and the Puadhi dialect of Haryanvi.

== History ==
Raipur Rani was founded in 1420 by Rao Rai Singh who claimed to be one of the sons of Rana Har Rai Singh who came from Ajmer, and was ruled until Indian Independence by his descendants who were titled Rao Sahib.

== Fort of Raipur Rani ==
Raipur Rani has a fort built by a man who came from Ajmer and was ruled until Indian Independence. The descendants of the ruling family now reside in Chandigarh.

== Demographics ==
As of 2001 the Indian census, Raipur Rani had a population of 7027. Males constitute 54% of the population and females 46%. Raipur Rani has an average literacy rate of 69%, higher than the national average of 59.5%: male literacy is 74%, and female literacy is 63%. In Raipur Rani, 15% of the population is under six years of age. It is also known for its mythological and historical importance. It is believed that The tenth Sikh Guru, Guru Gobind Singh had visited the Queen of Raipur and hence named the place after the queen.

It is a place which has bounty of nature in its realms. Popular picnic spot called as Morni Hills is also within a proximity of 10 kilometres (6.2 miles).

== Sharda Mata (Maa Sarasvati Devi) Temple Chotta Trilokpur ==
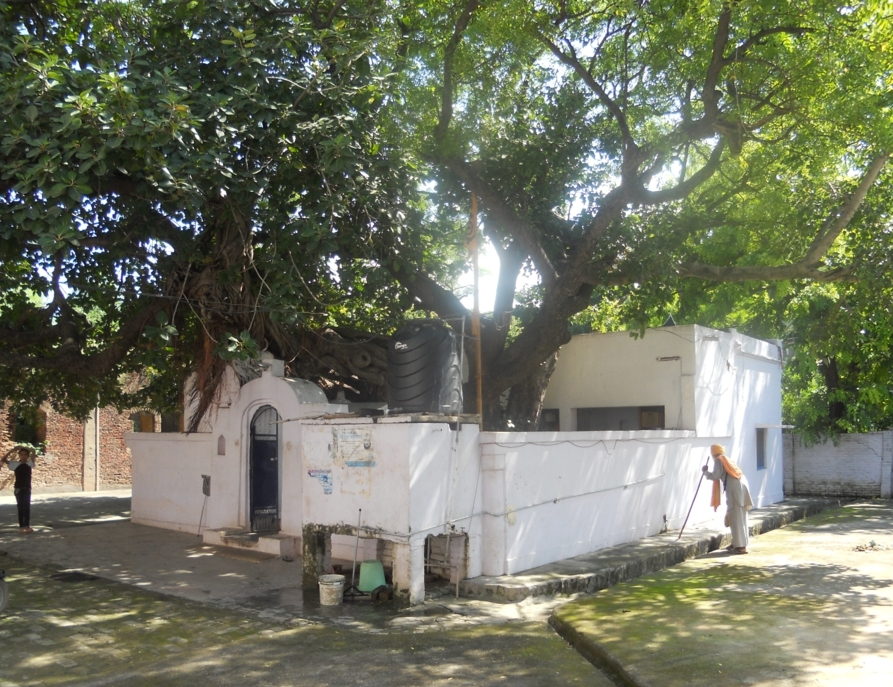
Historical Gurdwara in Raipur Rani Fort

Sharda Mata Temple Chotta Trilokpur, also known as Maa Sarasvati Devi Temple Chotta Trilokpur, is the Temple Complex of Sharda Mata in the village of Chhota Trilokpur, 11 kilometres (6.8 miles) from Raipur Rani on the border of Haryana and Himachal Pradesh. It is a temple to Maa Saraswati, the Hindu goddess of knowledge and learning. This village formed part of the old Nahan state.

As part of INR1200 crore plan announced in January 2019, Government of Haryana is developing this temple, along with Kalesar Mahadev temple, Kapal Mochan Tirth, Panchmukhi Hanuman temple of Basatiyawala and Lohgarh fort capital of Banda Singh Bahadur.

== Education ==
Raipur Rani is growing up as an education hub. One Government College (co-educational) started in session 2018–19, located near bus stand. There are so many high & senior secondary schools in Raipur Rani, providing both English and Hindi education. Among these are the Government Senior Secondary School (co-educational). There are One Govt industrial training institute & 2 Private Industrial Training Institutes in town. G&G I.T.I. Is NCVT affiliated and Serving since 2006.

There are also many computer training centers which are providing IT education with latest technologies named as Guideline Computer Centre and many others.

== See also ==
- Haryana Tourism
- List of Monuments of National Importance in Haryana
- List of State Protected Monuments in Haryana
- List of Indus Valley Civilization sites in Haryana
- List of National Parks & Wildlife Sanctuaries of Haryana, India
- List of national parks of India
- Wildlife sanctuaries of India
