= Tau Devi Lal Athletic Stadium (Panchkula) =

Multi-purpose stadium in Panchkula, Haryana, India

- Interactive map of Tau Devi Lal Athletic Stadium
- Location: Sector 3, Panchkula, Haryana, India
- Coordinates: 30°41′6″N 76°52′11″E
- Owner: Government of Haryana
- Capacity: 12,000
- Surface: Grass
- Scoreboard: Yes

Tenants
- RoundGlass Punjab, youth Haryana Steelers; Minerva Academy FC (sometimes)

Tau Devi Lal Stadium is a multi-purpose stadium located in Sector 3, Panchkula, a satellite town in the outskirts of Chandigarh.

It is the home ground of the Indian Super League side RoundGlass Punjab FC, together with Guru Nanak Stadium. It was also used as home ground by AIFF XI in the I-League.

The ground is situated next to the Tau Devi Lal Cricket Stadium and consists of a synthetic running track and a football pitch at the center.

== See also ==
- Dominence of Haryana in sports
