= Chaplana =

Indian village

Coordinates: 30°43′29″N 77°03′39″E

- Village
- Country: India
- State: Haryana
- District: Panchkula

Chaplana is a rural village located in the Panchkula district of Haryana, India. It is situated within the Morni Hills area.

== Administration ==
For local governance, the village comes under the Bhoj Tipra Gram Panchayat.
