= Panchkula IT Park =

Panchkula Tech Park
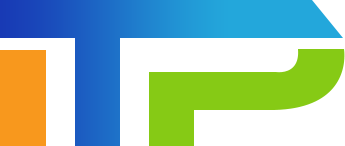
- Industry: Information technology
- Headquarters: Panchkula, Haryana, India
- Number of employees: 20,000
- Website: www.itpkl.com

Panchkula is planned city in Panchkula district, Haryana, India and IT Hub of Haryana. Panchkula IT Park, was established in 2008. It is situated in sector 22, Panchkula behind the Nada Sahib Gurudwara. HSIIDC had acquired the land from Haryana Urban Development Authority in 2007 and allotted the sites to various companies
