= Panchkula Welfare Trust =

The Panchkula Welfare Trust was set up in 1999 by a group of 15 philanthropists in Panchkula, Haryana, India.

== Trustees ==
The trust was founded by 15 members to serve the society of Panchkula and nearby areas. The list of trustees is as follows:

- Dr. Naresh Mittal, House No 212, Sector 6, Panchkula
- Er. Sham Lal Garg
- Er. Kulbhooshan Goyal
- Sh. Satish Jain
- Sh. Raj Kumar Gupta
- Sh. Mahesh Garg
- Sh. Pawan Kumar Katia
- Sh. Baldev Bansal
- Sh. Bhupinder Goyal
- Sh. Madan Gopal
- Sh. Mithan Lal Singla
- Sh. Pawan Kumar
- Sh. RK Goyal
- Er. SP Singla
- Sh. Suneel Gupta

== Charitable Diagnostic Centre ==
The trust has set up a 'Charitable Diagnostic Centre' in the city of Panchkula to provide quality, ethical, timely and affordable medical diagnostic services to society. The centre works on a 'No Profit No Loss' basis and provides diagnostic services to the people at almost one third of the market rates. The Centre provides the following services:

- 1. CT Scan Spiral
- 2. Computerized ECG
- 3. Colour Dopplers
- 4. EEG
- 5. Ultrasound
- 6. Mammography
- 7. Two Digital X-ray with Image Intensifier
- 8. Axsym fully Automatic System for Hormones Drug Analysis
- 9. Hitachi Random Access Bio-Chemistry Fully Automatic Analyzer
- 10. Fully Automatic Blood Cell Counter

The centre has served over 5 lakhs people (500,000 persons) since its day of opening.

Panchkula Gaushala Trust has been set up by same trustees to serve the stray cattle. The land was donated by Mata Mansa Devi Board. The Trust members have contributed the capital amount to set up world class gaushala at Mata Mansa Devi Temple. The gaushala is currently habdking 600 cows( all of these have are stray cattle collected by Municipal Corporation, Panchkula).

== Future plans ==
The trust now plans to introduce additional services such as MRI and educational facilities to students.

The trust is also working with the Government of Haryana to adopt clinics and manage these more efficiently.
