= National Cactus and Succulent Botanical Garden and Research Centre =

Cactus garden in Panchkula, Haryana, India

Cactus Garden
- National Cactus and Succulent Botanical Garden
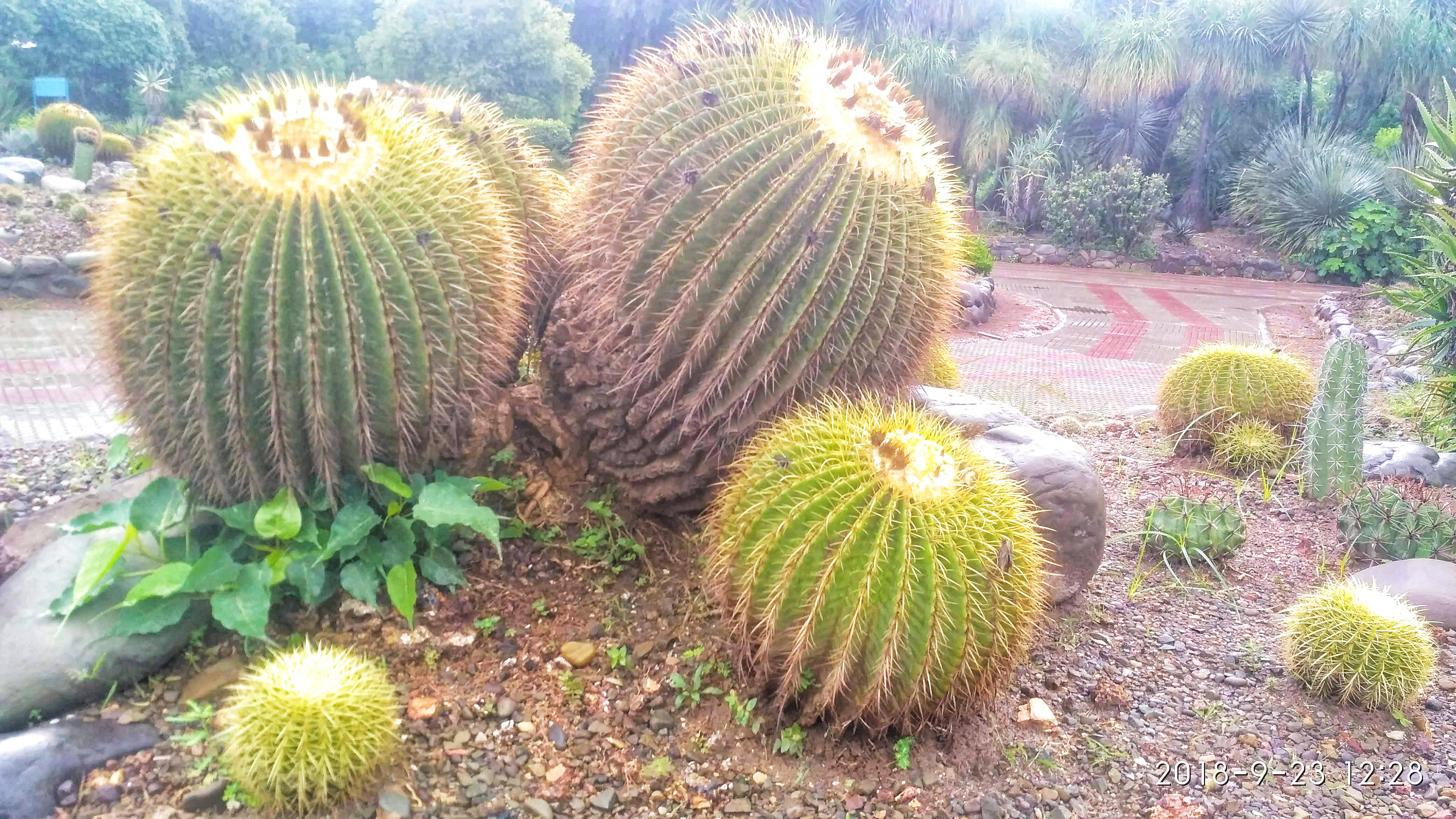
- Cactus in cactus garden
- Interactive map of Cactus Garden
- Type: Succulent Botanical Garden
- Location: Panchkula, Haryana
- Coordinates: 30°41′51.6768″N 76°51′2.7936″E
- Area: 7 acres (2.83 ha)
- Created: 12 May 1992

The National Cactus and Succulent Botanical Garden and Research Centre, known as the Cactus Garden, is a 7 acres (2.8 ha) cactus garden in Sector 5 of Panchkula, Haryana, India, was established in 1987, and is known for its rare and endangered species of Indian succulent plants.

Following a year-long restoration drive by the Panchkula district administration and the Panchkula Metropolitan Development Authority (PMDA) under curator Major General (Retd.) C.S. Bewli, the garden was formally reopened by Haryana Chief Minister Nayab Singh Saini on 13 March 2026 during Panchkula's three-day Spring Festival.

== Collection ==
The garden was opened in 2004 with 500 plants from the collection of Tarsem Lal, and founded by J S Sarkaria, whose son later lamented the lack of expert care the plants were receiving.

It has more than 3,500 species of cactus, many of them endangered, including Opuntias (prickly pears and chollas), Ferocactus (barrels), other succulents include Agaves, columnar cacti, Echinocereus (hedgehogs), and Mammillarias (pincushions) and is the largest of its kind in Asia.

== Gallery ==
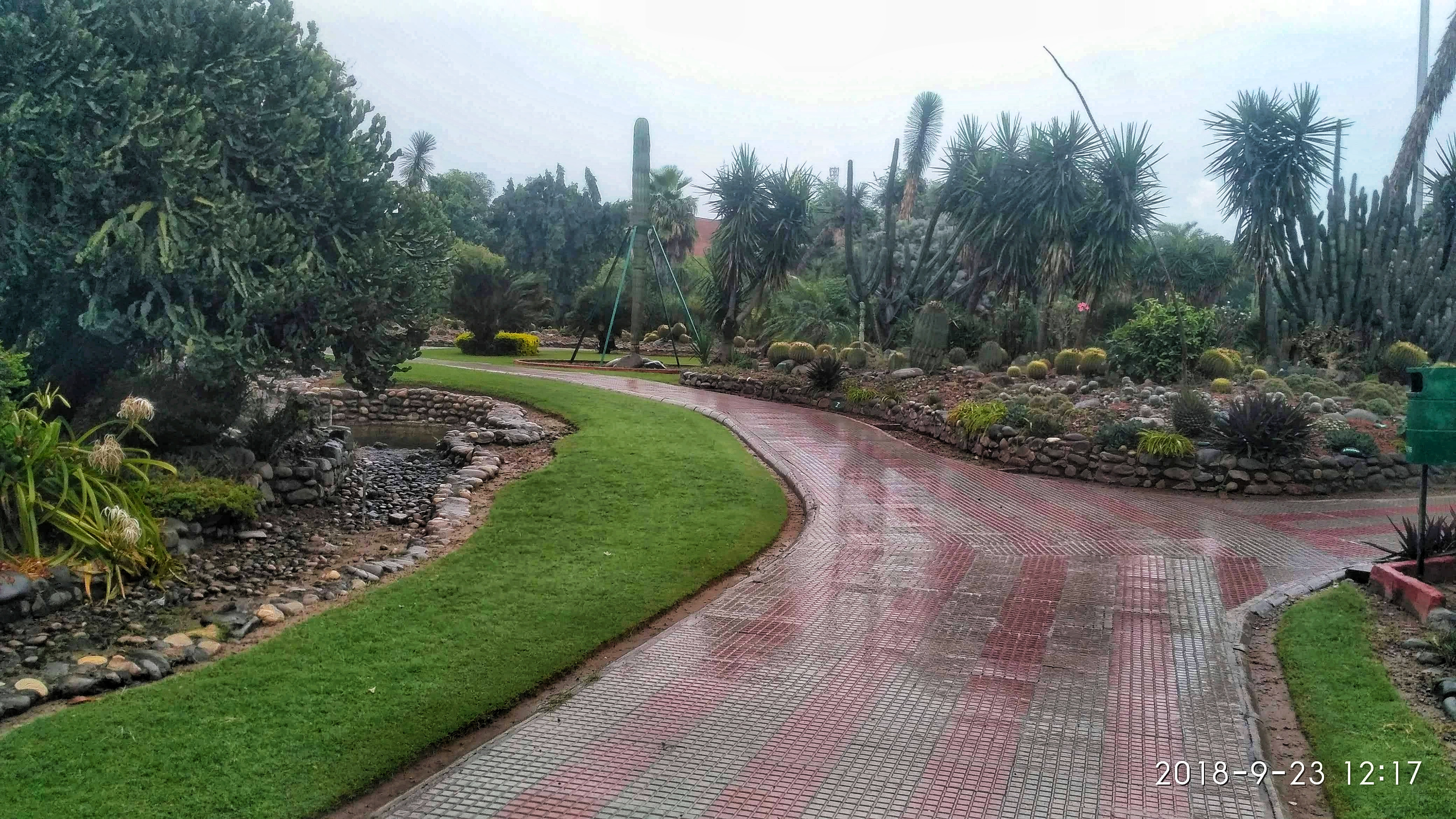
Garden view of cactus garden

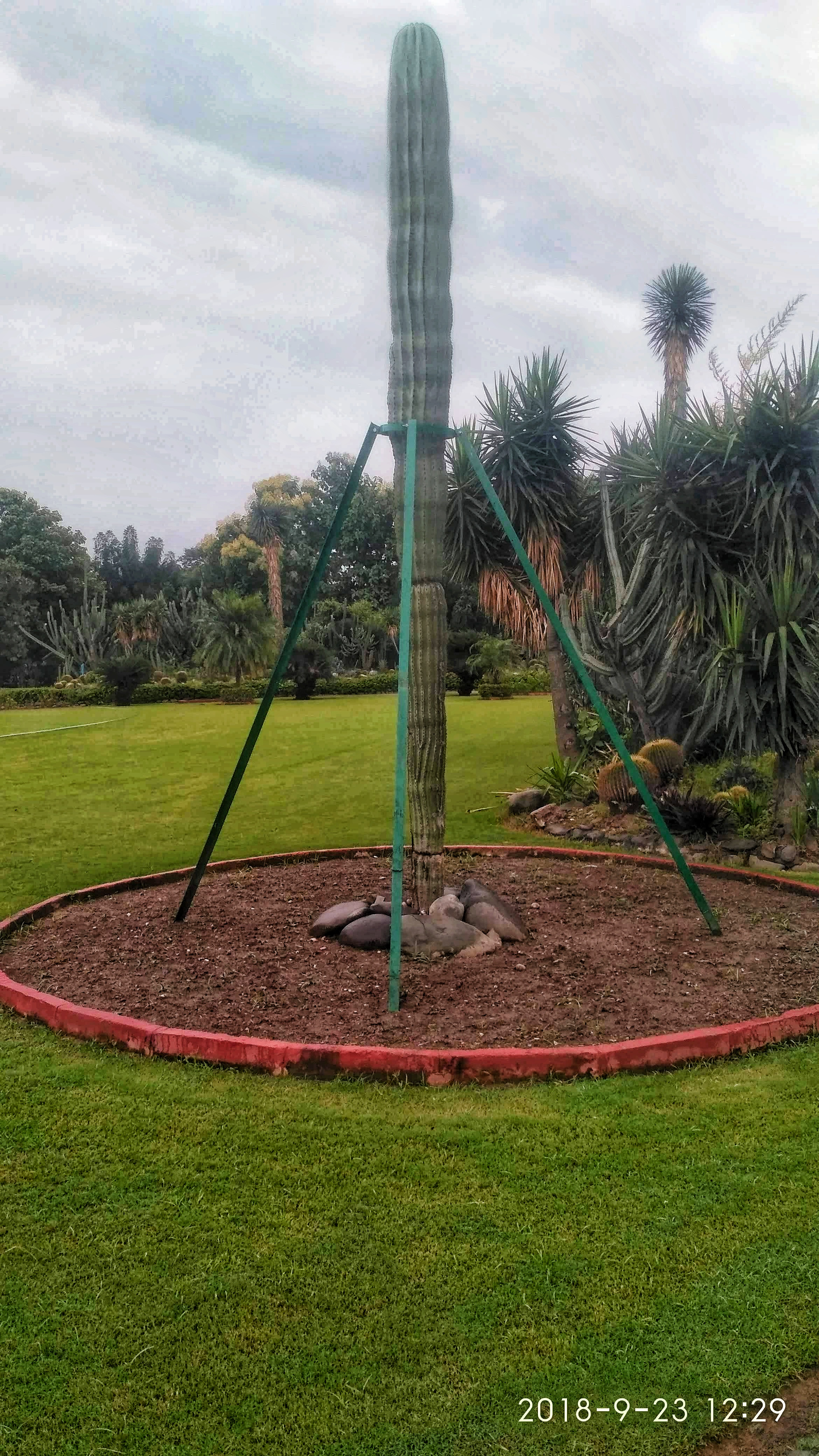
Long cactus plant at cactus garden

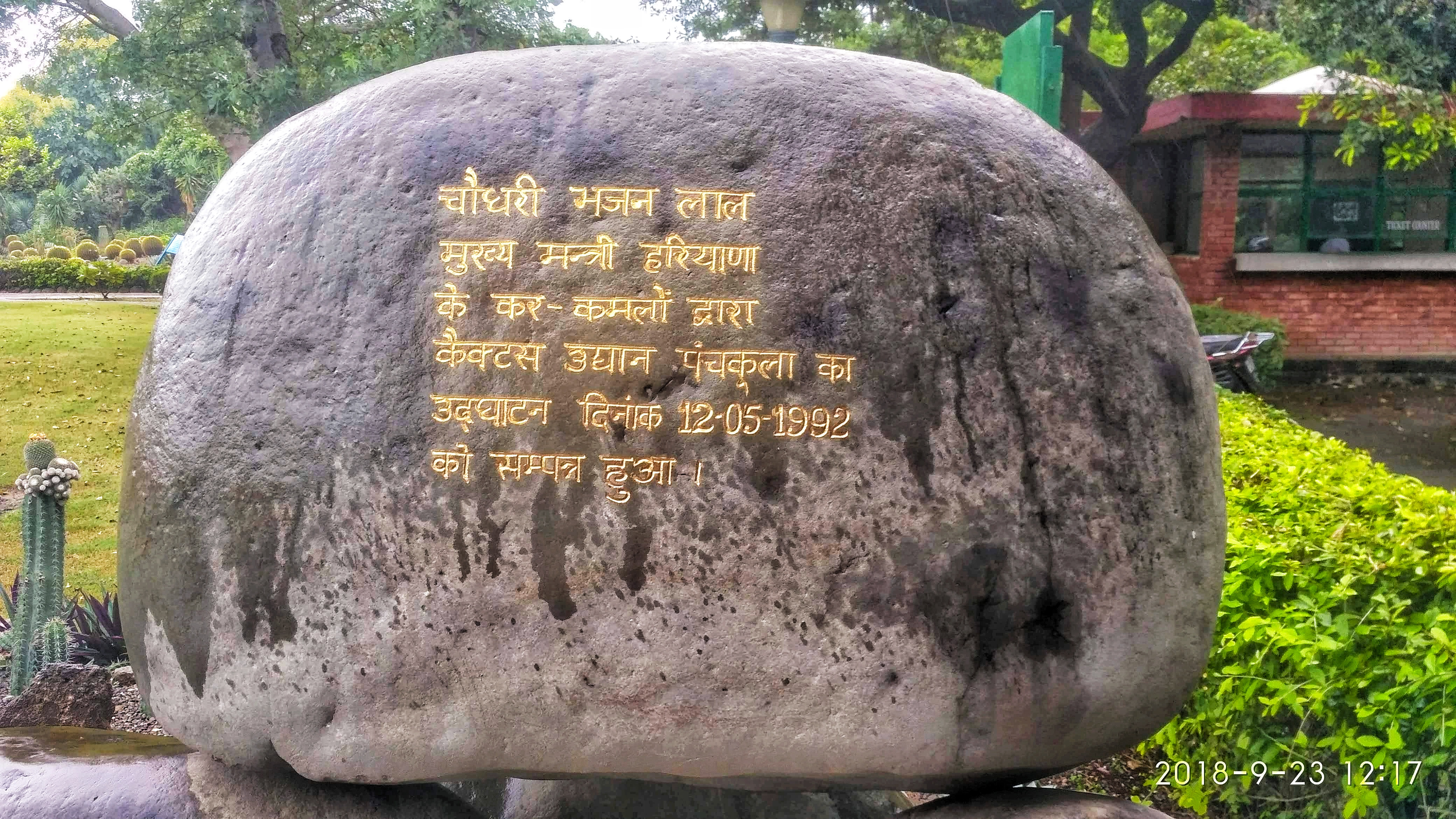
Inauguration stone cactus garden

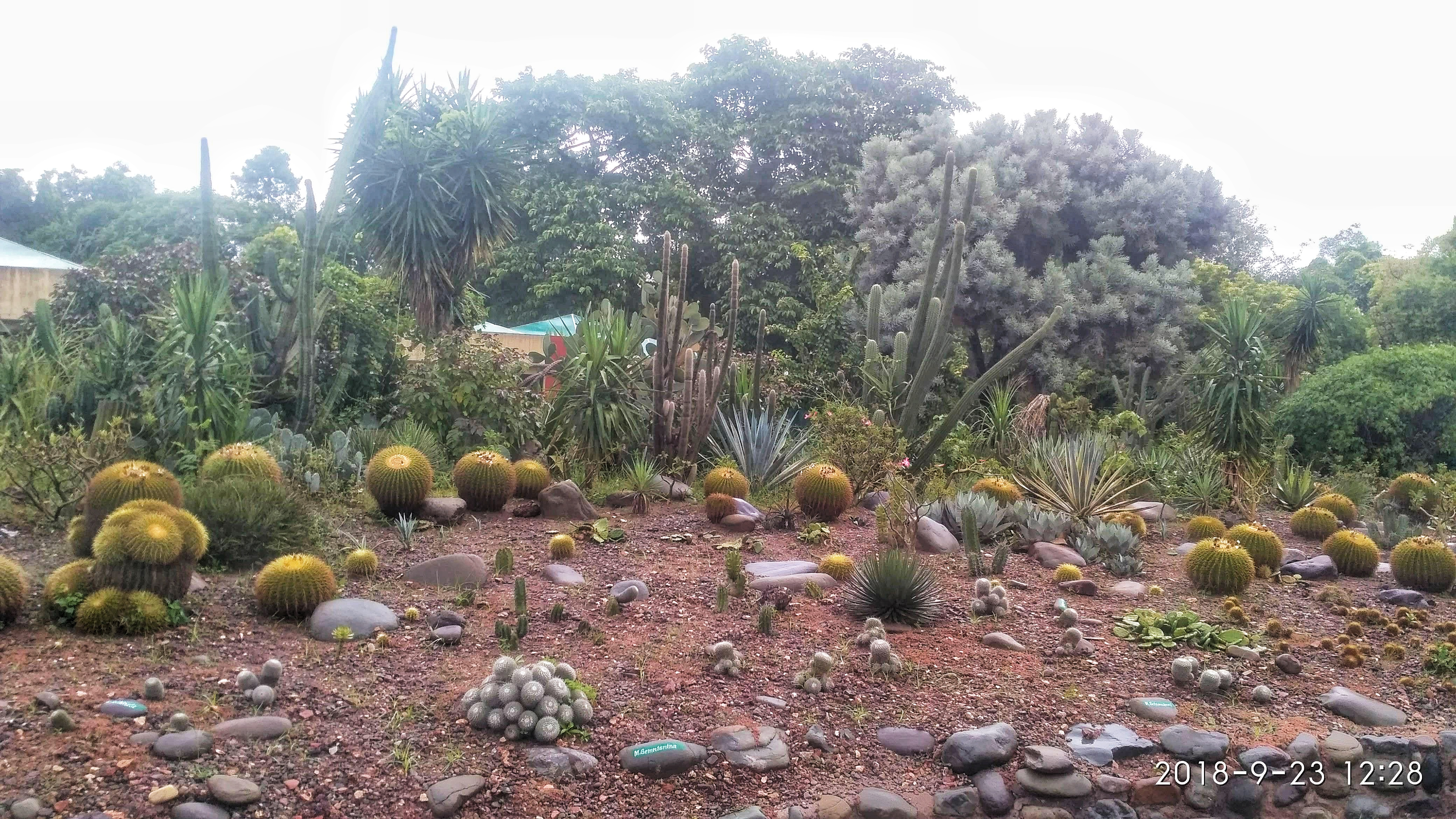
Plants views on cactus garden
