= Saketri Shiv Mandir =

Historic Hindu temple in Panchkula, India

Saketri Shiv Mandir entrance

Saketri Shiv Mandir is a historic Hindu temple located in Panchkula, Haryana, India. Dedicated to Lord Shiva, the temple is known for attracting large numbers of pilgrims, particularly during Shivratri. According to a report by The Indian Express, thousands of devotees visit the temple from across northern India during the annual Shivratri festival.

Situated near the famous Mata Mansa Devi Mandir, the Saketri temple is considered one of the prominent pilgrimage sites in the region. Believed to be centuries old, the temple complex draws devotees not only from Haryana but also from neighboring Punjab, Himachal Pradesh, and the union territory of Chandigarh.

During festivals such as Shivratri, large crowds gather to offer milk and fruit to the deity and participate in ritual worship. In 2023, the Government of Haryana announced the construction of a new approach road to improve access to the temple during the festival period.

The temple is known for its traditional architecture and also hosts various religious events and fairs during auspicious occasions, including Shivratri, the Shravan month, and local Hindu festivals.
