= Barwala, Panchkula =

Barwala
- Town
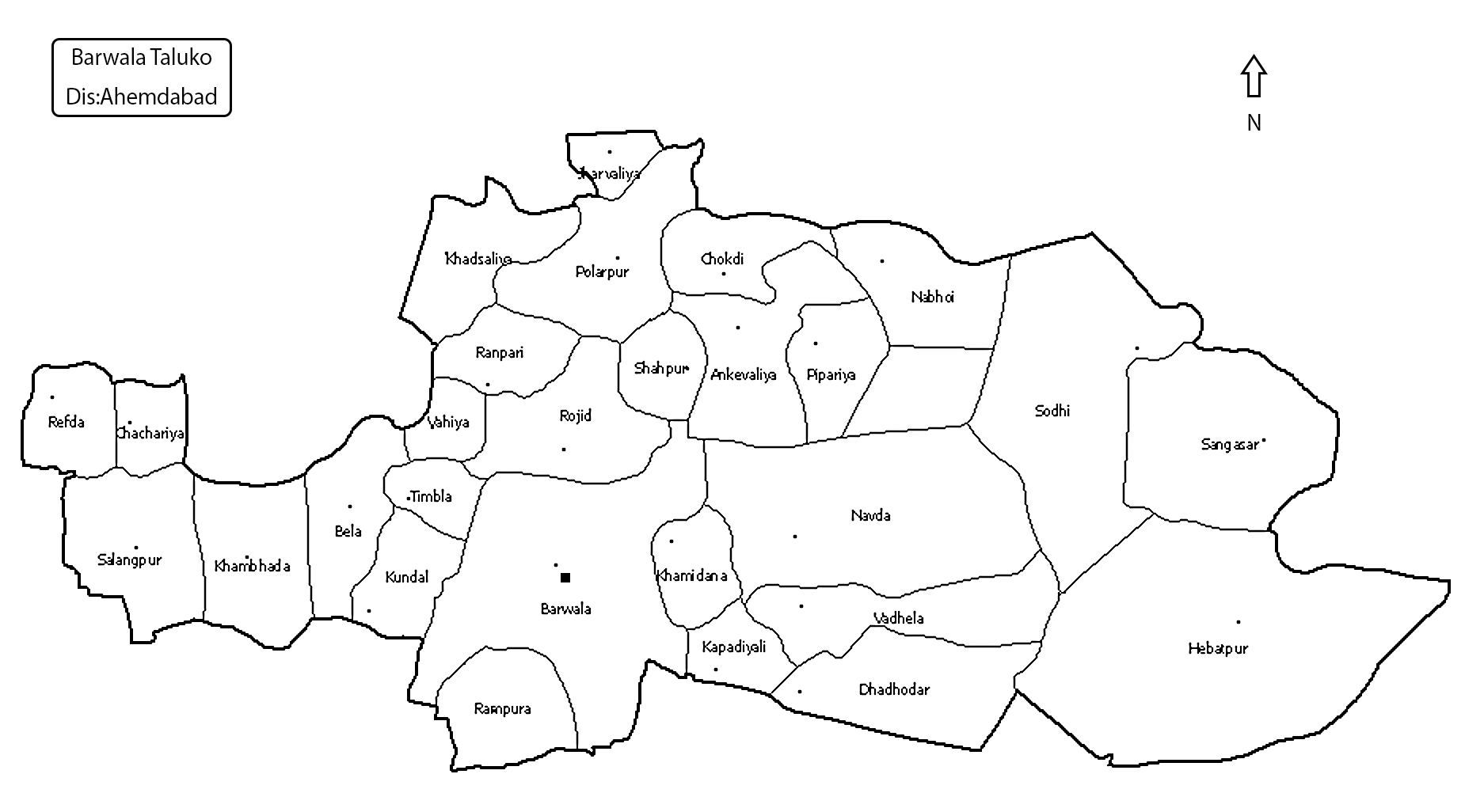

- Location in Haryana, India Barwala (India)
- Coordinates: 30.556995°N 76.939852°E
- Country: India
- State: Haryana
- District: Panchkula
- Elevation: 214 m (702 ft)

Population (2001)
  - Total: 33,130

Languages
  - Official: Hindi
  - Native: Puadhi
- Time zone: UTC+5:30 (IST)
- Postal code: 125121
- 01693: 01733
- ISO 3166 code: IN-HR
- Vehicle registration: HR
- Website: asscs.com

Barwala is a town and sub-tehsil in the Panchkula district of Haryana, India. Its lies Approx. 23 km from Panchkula city and 31 Kilometers from Chandigarh state capital.

The name "Barwala" is derived from "Bar", the Hindi word for Ficus benghalensis. The Barwala town is situated on the Haryana-Punjab border, near an Air Force station.

The Barwala block consists of 35 gram panchayats and 10 block sameeties. The block population is 48284.
