= Nada Sahib =

Gurdwara in Haryana India

Coordinates: 30.694°N 76.88°E

Gurudwara Nada Sahib
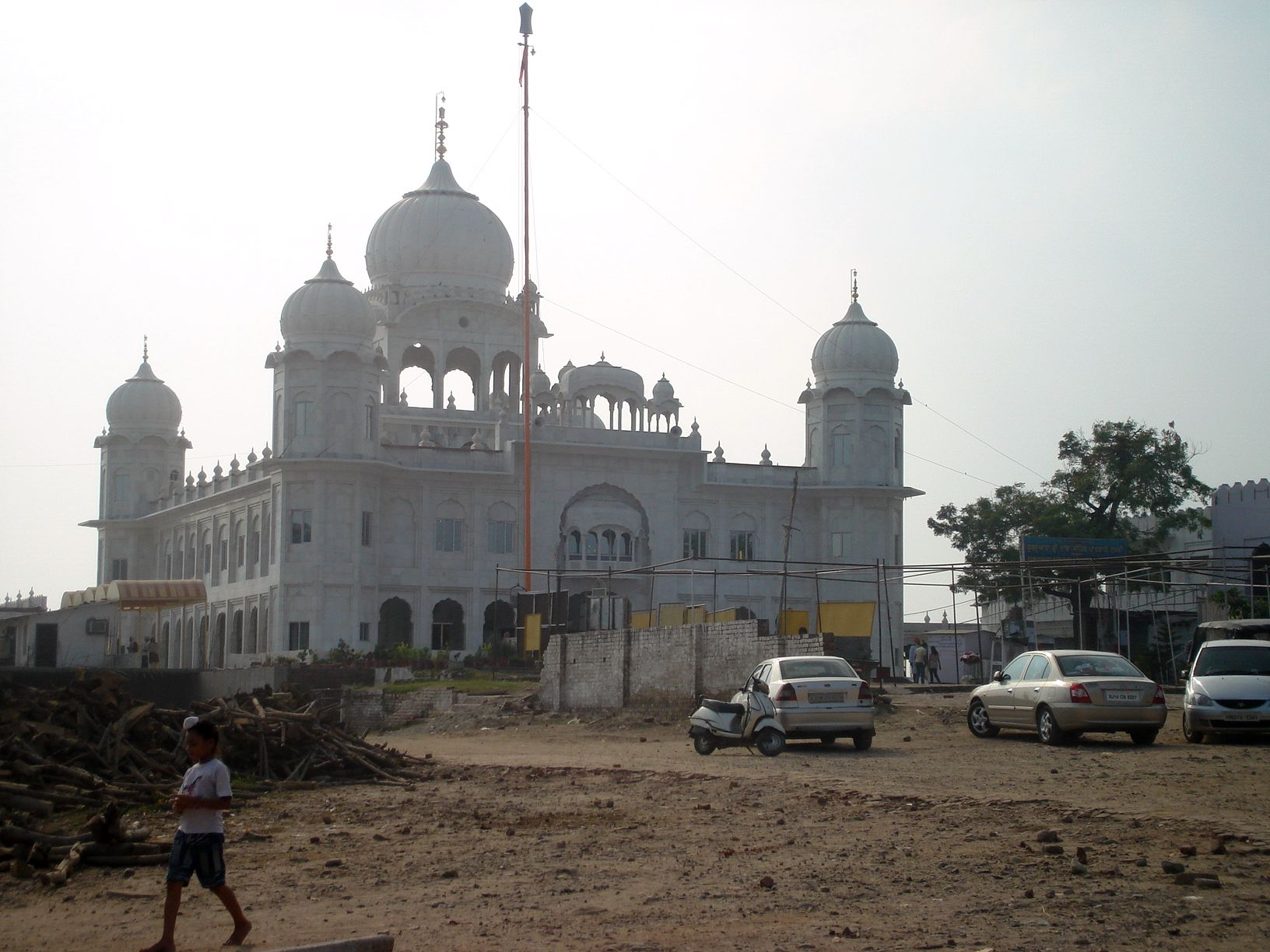
- Outside view of Nada Sahib gurdwara

Religion
- Affiliation: Sikhism

Location
- Location: Panchkula
- Interactive map of Gurudwara Nada Sahib

Architecture
- Style: Sikh architecture

Nada Sahib is a Sikh gurudwara in the Panchkula district of the Indian state of Haryana. Situated on the banks of the Ghaggar-Hakra River in the Sivalik Hills of Panchkula, it is the site where Guru Gobind Singh Ji halted while travelling from Paonta Sahib to Anandpur Sahib after the Battle of Bhangani in 1688.

== History ==
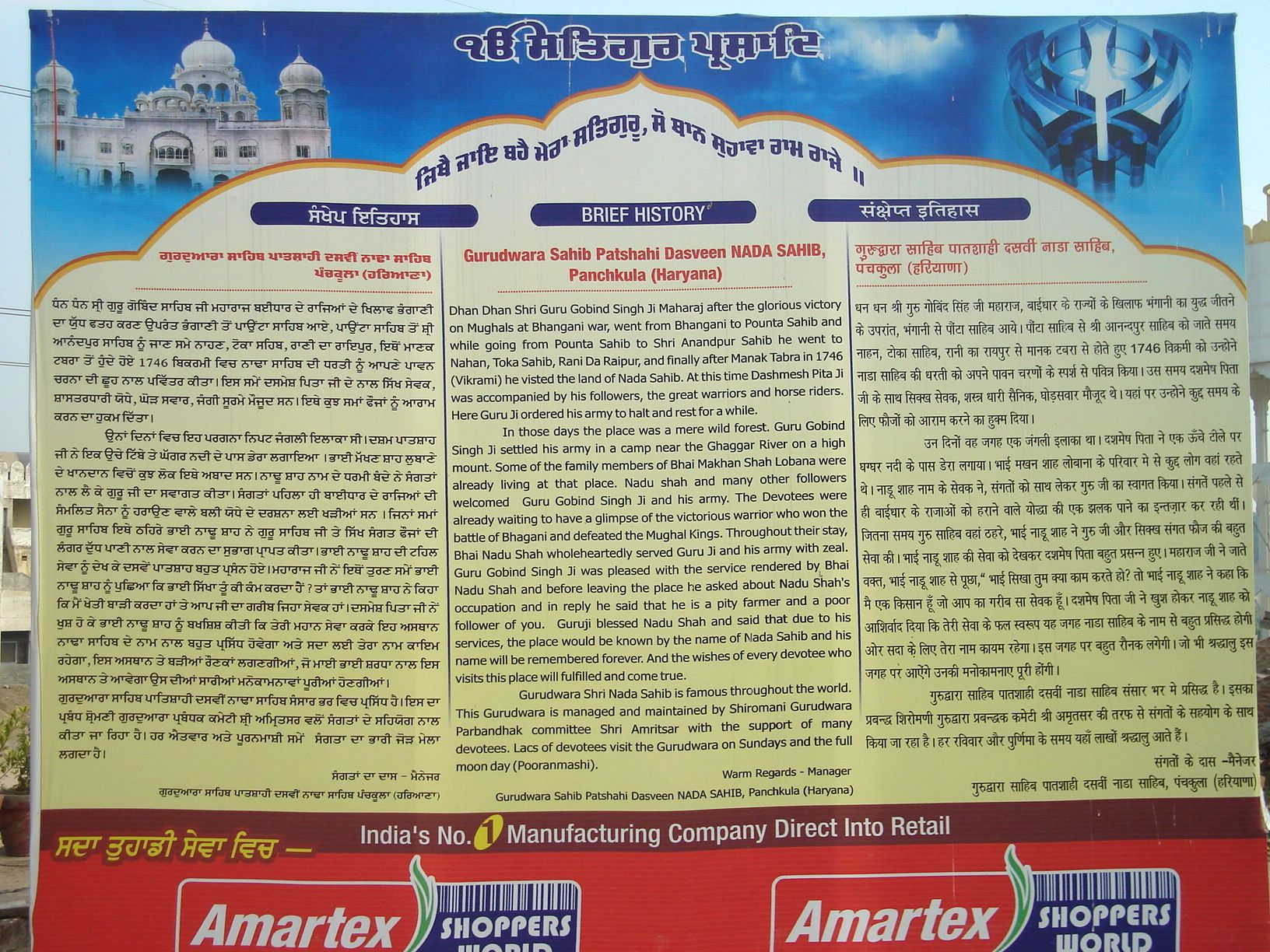
Brief history of the Gurudwara in Punjabi, English and Hindi languages.

The place remained obscure until nearby villager Bhai Motha Singh discovered the sacred spot and raised a platform to memorialize the Guru's visit. Nothing more is known of the devout Motha Singh nor of the date of the establishment of the Manji Sahib, except that the shrine was under the Dharmarth Board of Patiala and East Punjab States Union (PEPSU) in 1948 and was taken over by the Shiromani Gurdwara Parbandhak Committee (SGPC) after the merger of the state with Punjab in 1956.

Battle of Bhangani was fought between Guru Gobind Singh's army and Bhim Chand (Kahlur) of Bilaspur on 18 September 1686, at Bhangani near Paonta Sahib. Number of Rajput Rajas of Shivalik Hills participated in the war from Bhim Chand (Kahlur)‘s side. It was the first battle fought by Guru Gobind Singh, the tenth Sikh Guru, at the age of 19. The Bachitar Natak mentions that the battle resulted in the victory of the Guru's forces and the enemy forces fled from the battlefield.

The Guru, though victorious, did not occupy the conquered territory. Some historians such as H. Raturi, Anil Chandra Banerjee and A. S. Rawat speculate that the battle must have ended without conclusive result, since the Guru's victory is not reflected in any territorial annexations. The Guru entered into an understanding with Bhim Chand soon after the battle. However, this was most likely because the Guru was not after territorial gains, behaving as his grandfather Guru Hargobind had done when winning battles against the Mughals.

== Architecture ==
The original Manji Sahib was replaced by a two-story domed structure, with an adjacent large rectangular meeting hall. A spacious brick courtyard separates these buildings from the complex comprising the Guru ka Langar and rooms for pilgrims. The holy flag flies atop a 105 feet (32 m) high staff on one side of the courtyard, near the site of the old shrine. Religious gatherings and community meals take place daily. Every full moon day is celebrated, attended by large crowds.

== Sikh heritage museum ==
There is a Sikh heritage museum at Nada Sahib which showcases Sikh history.

== Conservation and enhancements ==
Under the PRASAD scheme, the Government of India, allocated INR 25cr (US3.3 million) for the upgrade of facilities in and around Gurudwara Nada Sahib.

== See also ==
- Haryana Sikh Gurdwara Parbandhak Committee
- Tourism in Haryana
- Religious tourism in India
