= Tau Devi Lal Cricket Stadium =

Cricket stadium in Panchkula, India

- Interactive map of Tau Devi Lal Cricket Stadium
- Location: Golf Course Road, Sector 3, Panchkula, India
- Coordinates: 30.6856°N 76.8669°E =
- Owner: Government of Haryana
- Operator: Government of Haryana
- Capacity: 7,000
- Surface: Grass
- Scoreboard: Yes

Construction
- Groundbreaking: 2007
- Opened: 2007

Website
- ESPNcricinfo

Tau Devi Lal Stadium is a cricket stadium located in Sector 3, Panchkula, a satellite town in the outskirts of Chandigarh. The stadium is capable of holding around 7,000 spectators and came into picture because of the Indian Cricket League's inaugural Twenty20 tournament. The stadium has been leased by Government of Haryana. but was one of three venues that was used by Indian Cricket League along with Sardar Vallabhbhai Patel Stadium in Ahmedabad and Lal Bahadur Shastri Stadium in Hyderabad.

== See also ==
- Sector 16 Stadium
- Punjab Cricket Association IS Bindra Stadium
- Mullanpur International Cricket Stadium
- Dominence of Haryana in sports
