= Upinder Kaur Ahluwalia =

Indian Politician, Mayor of Panchkula

Honourable Upinder Kaur Ahluwalia

Mayor of Panchkula
- In office 2013–2018

Personal details
- Party: Bharatiya Janata Party (2026-Present)
- Other political affiliations: Indian National Congress

Upinder Kaur Ahluwalia is an Indian politician. She is the first woman mayor of Panchkula, part of Chandigarh Tricity.

== Career ==
She won the election for Mayor of Panchkula in 2013 for Indian National Congress. She was elected in 2013 MC elections for Mayor with the support of 12 members. In 2013 when state government was of her party, Panchkula saw progress in her early tenure, but after the opposition took the majority in 2014 elections, a lack of funds by BJP-led Government caused all work to end.

The High Court refused the petition of dissolving of Municipal Corporation after all work was stopped due to lack of funds, by stating works such as road reconstruction, food and others managed were to be done by MCP. In April 2026, Ahluwalia officially quit the Congress party to join the Bharatiya Janata Party (BJP). She joined alongside her husband, Dhanender Singh Ahluwalia, ahead of the local civic body elections.
