= Abbott AxSYM =

Immunochemical automated analyzer

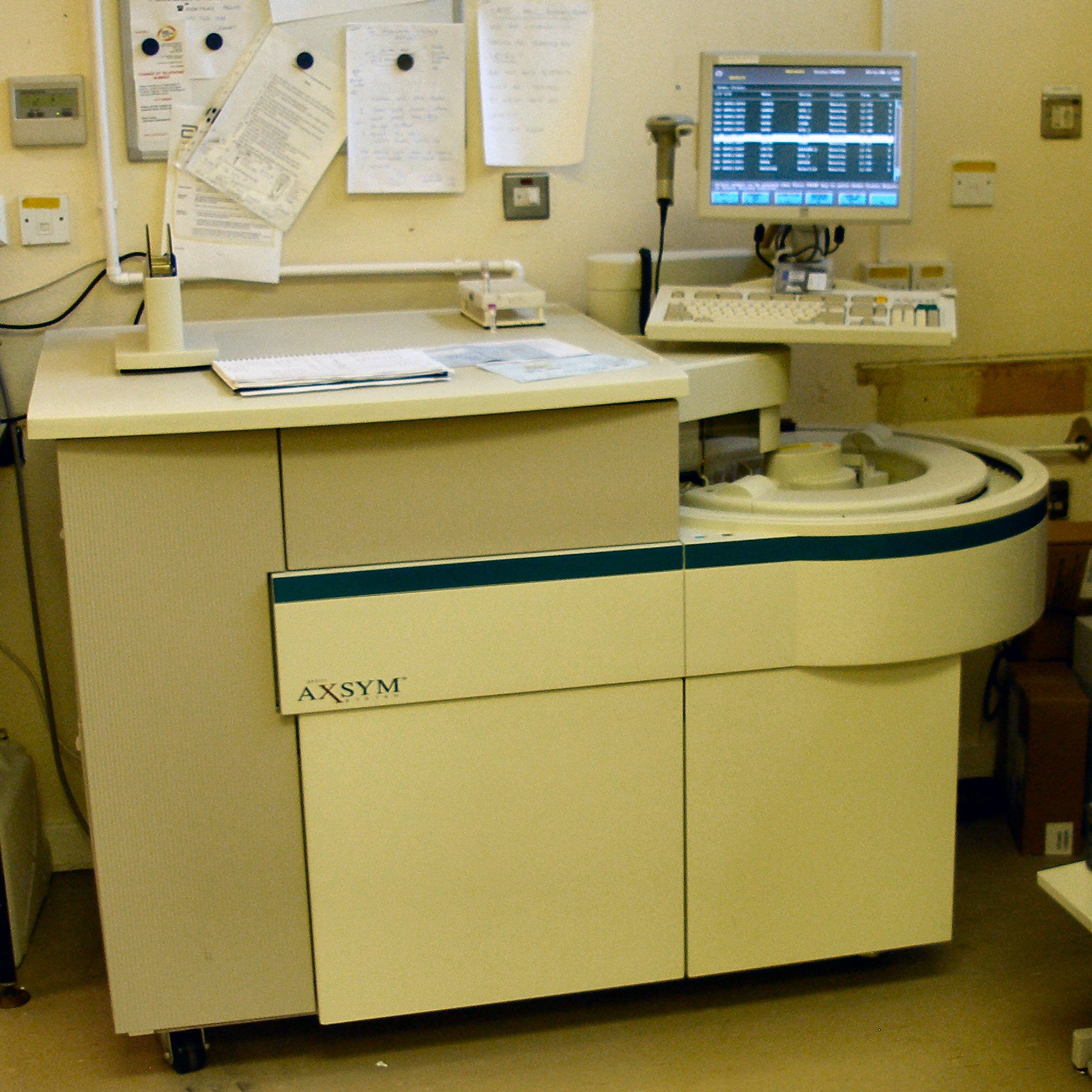
Abbott's AxSYM automated analyzer.

The Abbott AxSYM is an immunochemical automated analyzer made by Abbott Laboratories. It is used for serology tests and therapeutic drug monitoring, and uses antibodies to alter the deflection of polarized light. It can also be used to monitor hormone level and some cardiac markers such as troponin.

== Appearance and use ==
Blood samples and reagents are placed in separate carousels on the right of the machine. This instrument is used in medical laboratories by trained medical personnel. It can process about 100 samples an hour.
