= Panchkula district =

Coordinates: 30°41′24″N 76°51′36″E

- District of Haryana
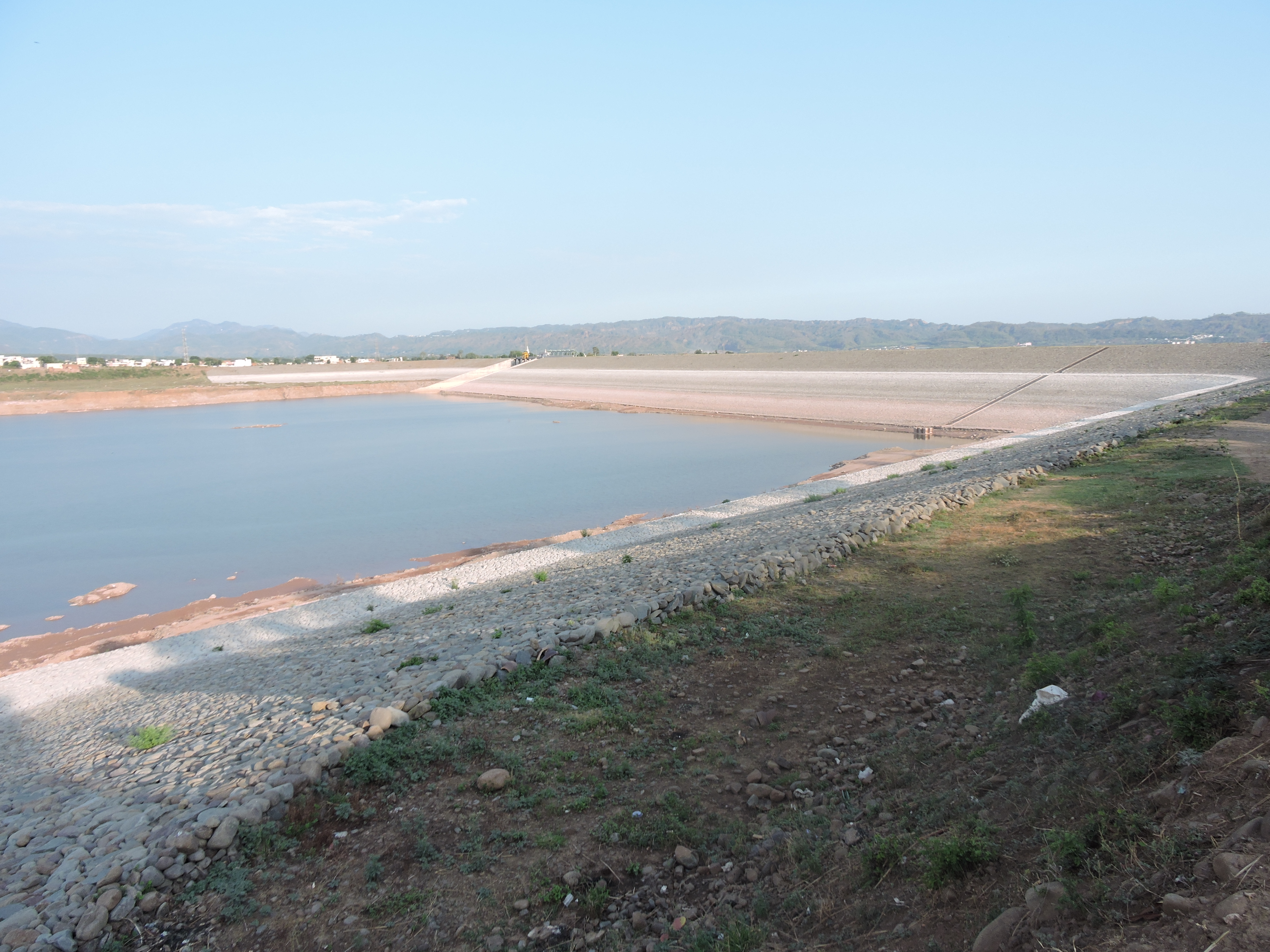
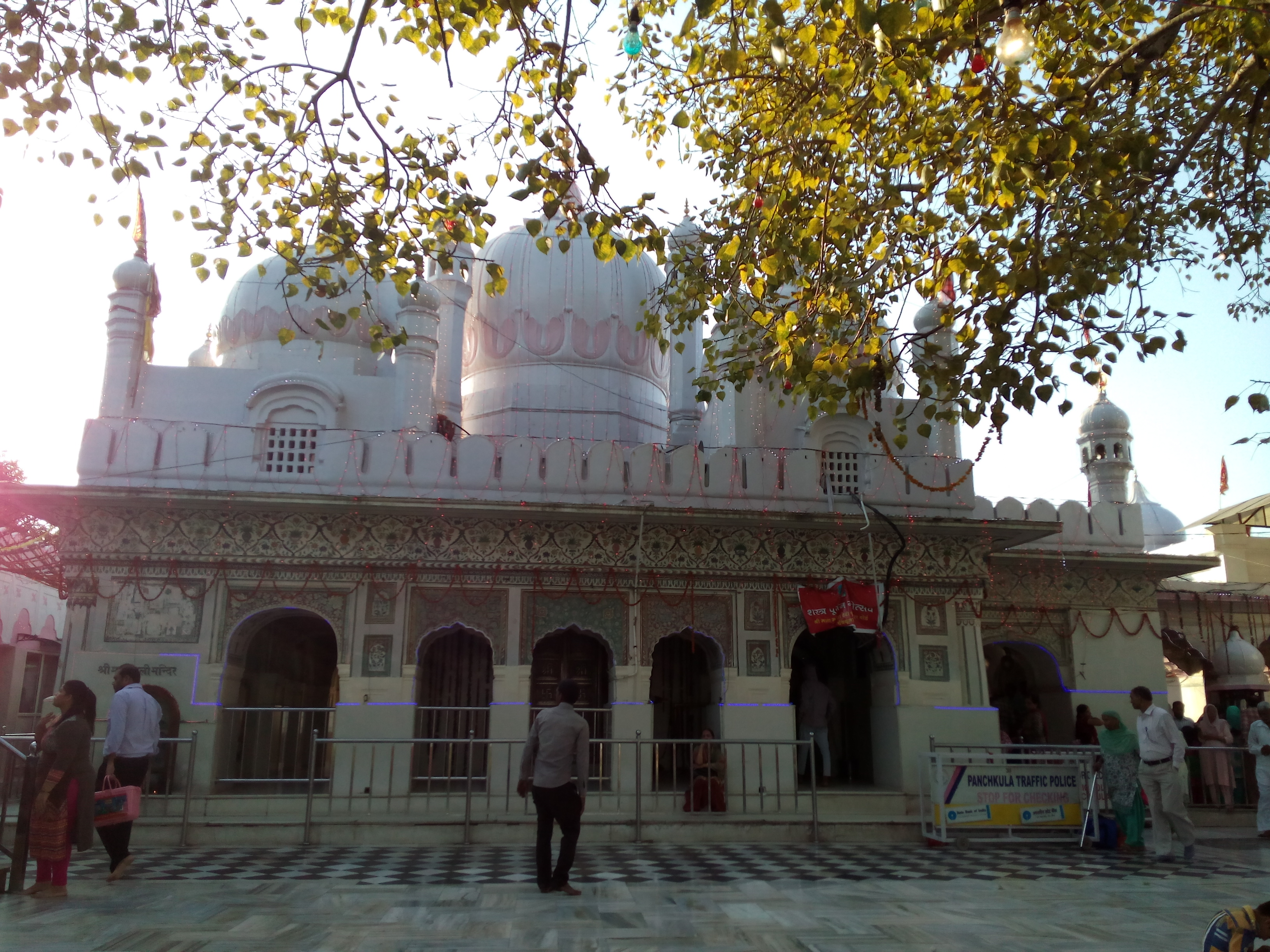
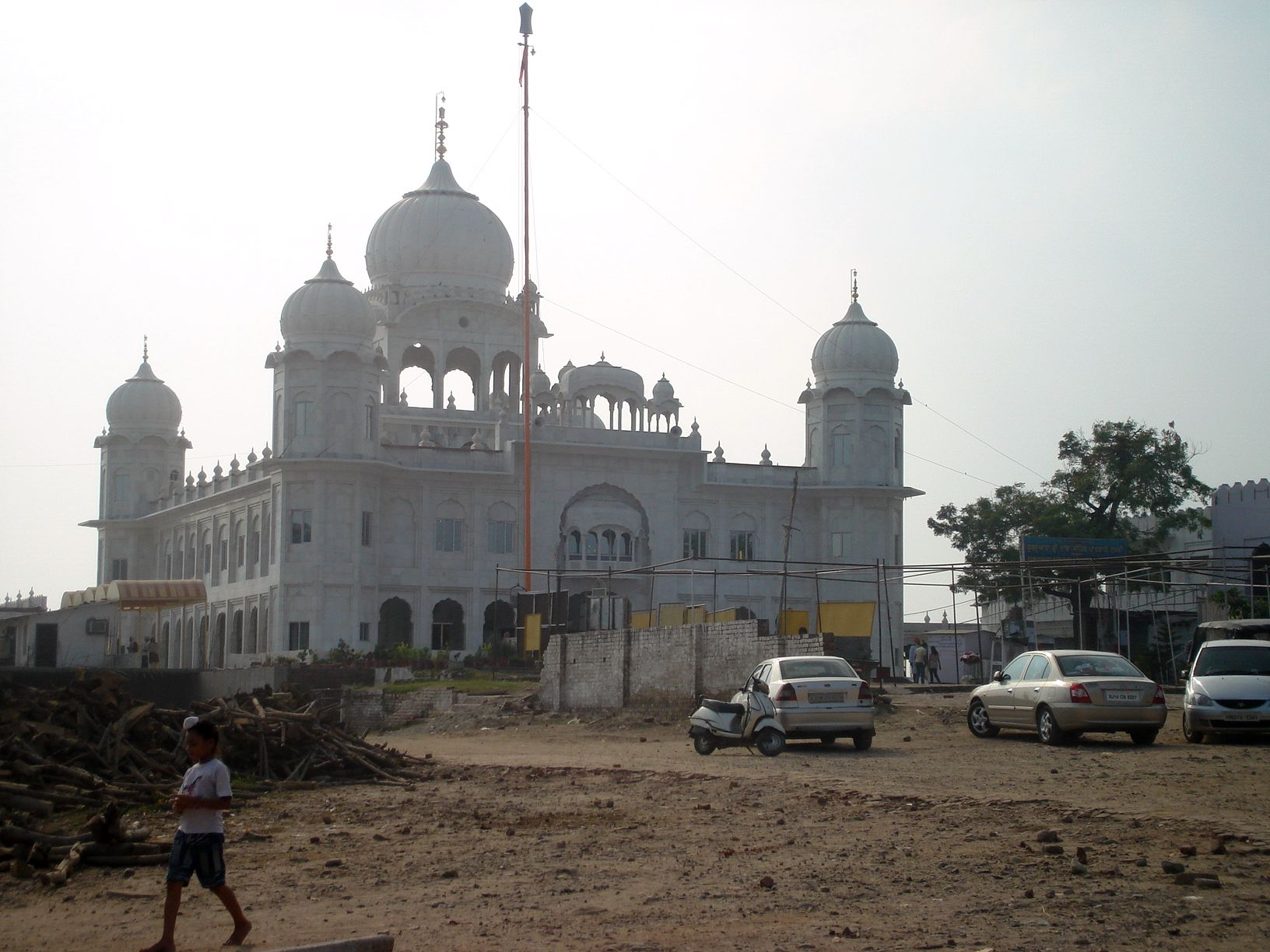
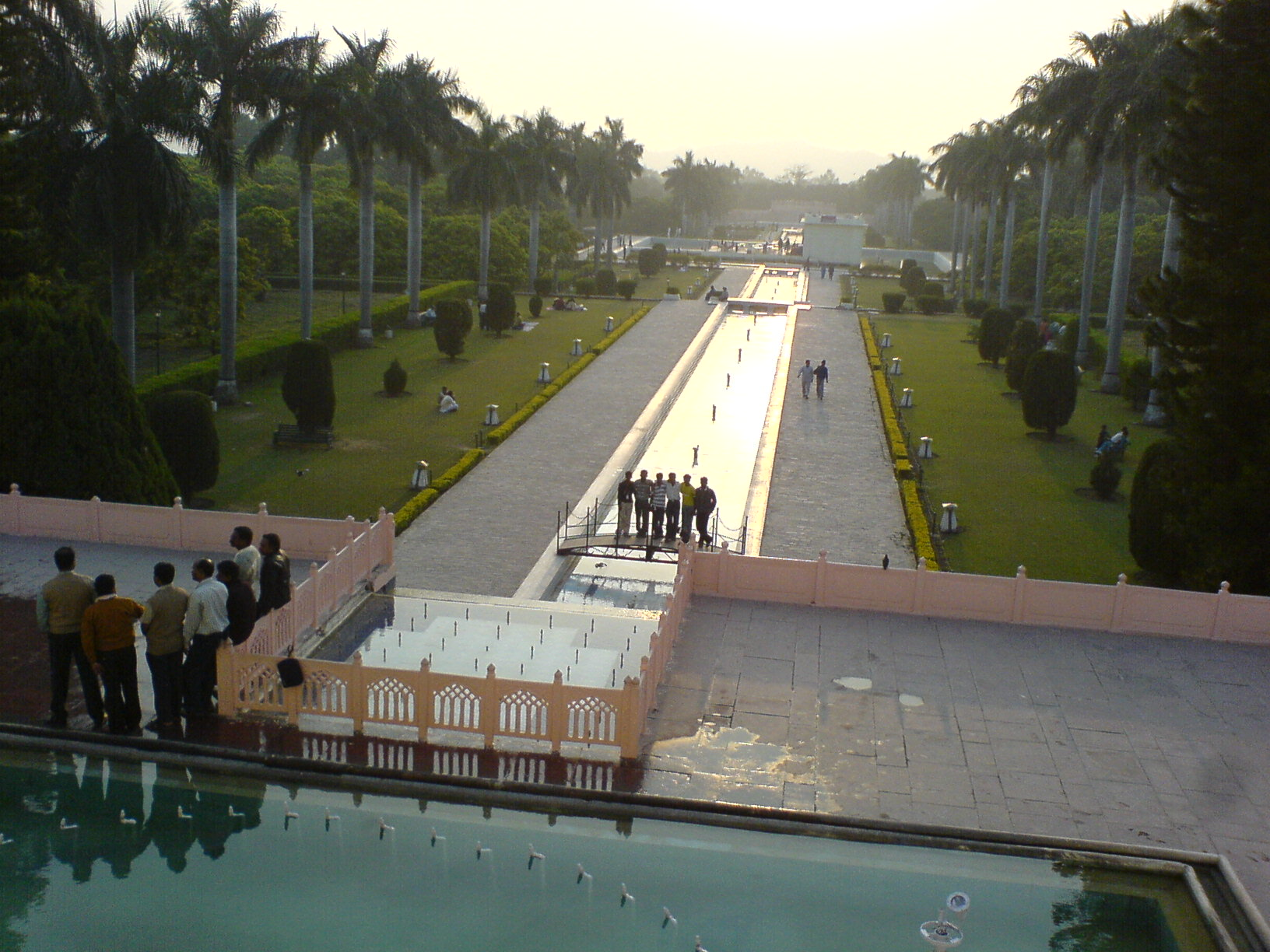
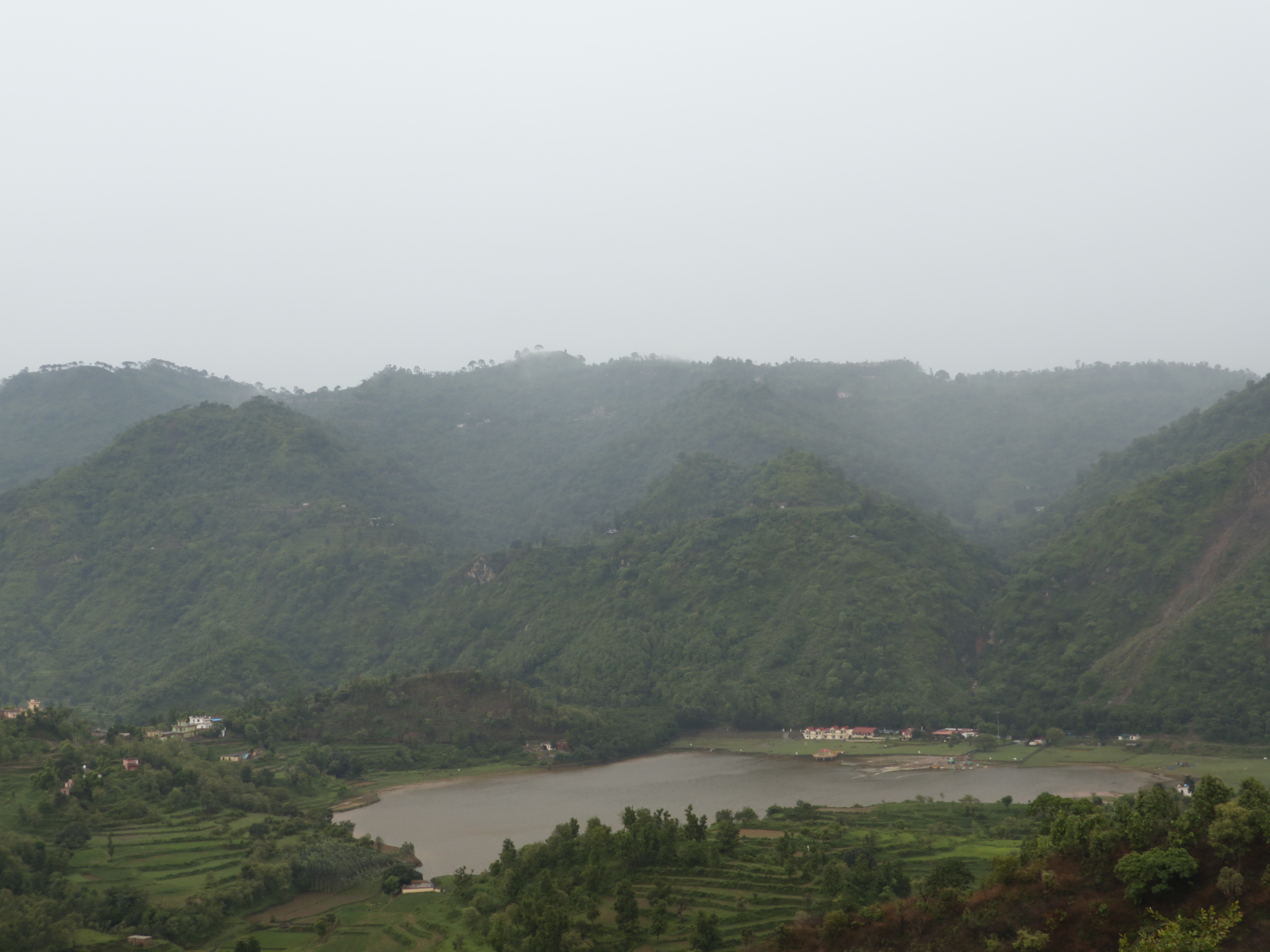
- Clockwise from top-left: Kaushalya Dam, Mansa Devi Temple in Panchkula, Pinjore Gardens, Tikar Taal in the Morni Hills, Nada Sahib

- Location in Haryana
- Country: India
- State: Haryana
- Headquarters: Panchkula
- Tehsils: 1. Panchkula, 2. Kalka

Government
  - Lok Sabha constituencies: Ambala (shared with Ambala and Yamuna Nagar districts)
  - Vidhan Sabha constituencies: 1. KALKA, 2. PANCHKULA

Area
  - Total: 898 km^{2} (347 sq mi)

Population (2011)
  - Total: 561,293
  - Density: 625/km^{2} (1,620/sq mi)

Demographics
  - Literacy: 74.00
  - Sex ratio: 823

Languages
  - Official: Hindi
  - Regional: Baghati; Haryanvi; Puadhi
- Time zone: UTC+05:30 (IST)
- Vehicle registration: HR 03
- Website: panchkula.gov.in

Panchkula district was formed as the 17th district of the Indian state of Haryana on 15 August 1995. It comprises two sub divisions and two tehsils: Panchkula and Kalka. It has 264 villages, out of which 12 are uninhabited and ten have been wholly merged with towns or treated as census towns according to the 1991 census. There are five towns in the district: Barwala, Kalka, Panchkula, Pinjore and Raipur Rani.

At the 2011 Census of India, it was the least populous district of Haryana.

Panchkula city is the headquarters of this district. Chandimandir Cantonment is located in this district, adjoining the Panchkula Urban Estate.

== Languages and Dialects Spoken ==
The primary languages spoken in the district are Hindi, Standard Haryanvi, Baghati dialect of Mahasu Pahari and Puadhi dialect of Punjabi. While all languages are widely used in urban and rural settings, the prevalence of the Puadhi is a defining characteristic of Panchkula district's rural culture and above Chandi Mandir, the area of Pinjore and Kalka and Morni Hills are culturally parts of the Mahasu region.

== History ==
Panchkula takes its name from Panch khul, five natural springs in the area. The earlier main town in the region was Pinjore. Near the later part of the 7th century and early part of the 8th century, the district was part of the empires of Yasovarman of Kannauj and Lalitaditya Muktapida of Kashmir. It was part of the empire of Mihir Bhoj of the Gujara-Pratihara dynasty. In the 10th century CE, the region was raided by Mahmud of Ghazni several times. However it was soon brought back to peace by the Chauhans of Delhi, until Muhammad Ghori defeated Prithviraj Chauhan in 1192, when it became part of the Delhi Sultanate.

In 1254, Nasiruddin Muhammad plundered Pinjore, an event recorded in the Tabakhat-i-Nasiri. Timur sacked Pinjore on his return from Delhi. After Timur's invasion, Panchkula fell out of central control until 1450, when Bahlol Lodhi, then governor of Punjab, restored central control over the region as Sultan. Panchkula remained in Lodhi hands until Babur crushed the Lodhis at the Battle of Panipat and set up the Mughal Empire. Panchkula was part of the Sirhind Sarkar of Delhi Subah. During the reign of Aurangzeb, Fidai Khan Koka, his Master of Ordinance, constructed the Pinjore Gardens (now called Yadvindra Gardens) for use by Aurangzeb as a summer retreat.

After Aurangzeb's death in 1707, Banda Singh Bahadur, a disciple of Guru Gobind Singh, ravaged erstwhile Ambala district, including Panchkula, but was defeated at the Battle of Sadhaura in 1710. In 1739, the region was plundered again by Nader Shah. After his retreat, the region was dotted with various minor principalities such as Ramgarh, Raipur, Kotaha and Kizhirabad, which were practically independent. In 1755, Adina Beg defeated Qutub Khan, and in return was given the sarkar of Sirhind, included present Panchkula district. In 1753, Ahmed Shah Abdali invaded the region and took over the Sirhind Sarkar. Afghan rule was ended when the Sikhs killed Abdali's governor, Zain Khan Sirhindi, in 1763. Afterwards Panchkula district became part of various Sikh misls, and was incorporated into the Sikh Empire.

In 1805, the British conquered the region from the Sikhs, and made it part of the Ambala district. The 1857 Rebellion had a nerve centre in nearby Ambala, and Panchkula played a role in supporting the rebels. After the suppression of the rebellion, the region was made part of the British Raj. Panchkula became part of the Ambala district.

Ambala produced many freedom fighters such as Lala Muralidhar, who exhorted the people to fight against the British. At the time of Partition in 1947, Panchkula, like the rest of Punjab, saw riots which forced its Muslim population to flee to Pakistan and their replacement by Hindu and Sikh refugees from Pakistan. In 1950, the city of Chandigarh was founded in the then-middle of Punjab, situated very close to Panchkula. In 1966, Punjab was trifurcated into Punjab, Haryana and Himachal Pradesh. Ambala district was split and part of it went to Punjab, while the Panchkula and Ambala areas came to Haryana. In the 1970s, the Haryana Government began the construction of Panchkula as a planned city. In 1995, the district was split off from Ambala district.

== Demographics ==
Historical population
Year	Pop.	±% p.a.
1901	73,413	—
1911	61,578	−1.74%
1921	57,319	−0.71%
1931	66,103	+1.44%
1941	75,444	+1.33%
1951	81,104	+0.73%
1961	105,868	+2.70%
1971	141,291	+2.93%
1981	196,939	+3.38%
1991	310,396	+4.65%
2001	468,411	+4.20%
2011	561,293	+1.83%

Religion in Panchkula district (2011)
Religion	Percent
Hinduism	87.42%
Sikhism	7.30%
Islam	4.18%
Christianity	0.46%
Other or not stated	0.64%

According to the 2011 census of India, Panchkula district had a population of 561,293, This ranked it 537th in India out of a total of 640 districts. The district has a population density of 622 inhabitants per square kilometre (1,610/sq mi) . Its population growth rate over the decade 2001-2011 was 19.32%. Panchkula has a sex ratio of 870 females for every 1,000 males, and a literacy rate of 83.4%. 55.81% of the population lived in urban areas. Scheduled Castes made up 18.14% of the population.

Languages of Panchkula district (2011)
1. Hindi (82.1%)
2. Punjabi (9.48%)
3. Haryanvi (2.72%)
4. Baghati (1.19%)
5. Others (4.48%)

At the 2011 Census of India, 82.13% of the population in the district declared their first language to be Hindi, 9.48% Punjabi, 2.72% Haryanvi and 1.19% Pahari.
