= Panchkula =

- City
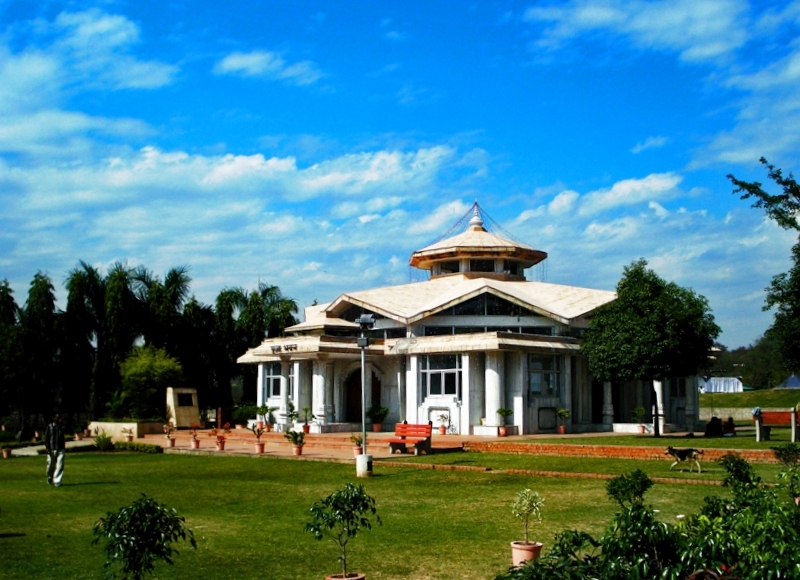
- Yagya Shala, within the Mansa Devi temple complex in Panchkula, Haryana
- Nickname: Chandigarh Tricity
- Location in Haryana, India Panchkula (India)
- Coordinates: 30.699558°N 76.855633°E
- Country: India
- State: Haryana
- District: Panchkula

Government
  - Type: Municipal Corporation
  - Body: Municipal Corporation Panchkula
  - Mayor: Shyamlal Bansal (BJP)

Area
  - Total: 32.6 km^{2} (12.6 sq mi)
- Elevation: 365 m (1,198 ft)

Population (2011)
  - Total: 211,355
  - Density: 6,480/km^{2} (16,800/sq mi)
- Demonym: Panchkula Wale

Languages
  - Official: Hindi
  - Additional official: English and Punjabi
  - Regional: Puadhi, Haryanvi
- Time zone: UTC+5:30 (IST)
- PIN: 134 109 - 134 116
- Telephone code: +91-172-XXX-XXXX
- ISO 3166 code: IN-HR
- Vehicle registration: HR-03
- Website: panchkula.nic.in mcpanchkula.com

Panchkula (ISO: Pañckulā) is a city and district headquarter in the Panchkula district in Haryana, India. It is a satellite city of the state capital Chandigarh. Panchkula is a border city with Punjab, Chandigarh and Himachal Pradesh. The origin of the name Panchkula came from "the place where five irrigation canals meet". It is approximately 4 kilometres (2.5 mi) southeast of Chandigarh, 105 km (65 mi) southwest of Shimla, 44 km (27 mi) from Ambala and 259 km (161 mi) northeast of New Delhi, the national capital. It is a part of the Chandigarh capital region or Greater Chandigarh. The Chandigarh-Mohali-Panchkula metropolitan region collectively forms a Chandigarh Tricity, with a combined population of over 2 million.

The city hosts the Chandimandir Cantonment, the headquarters of the Western Command of the Indian Army. It is a planned city like Chandigarh, with a sector system.

== Etymology ==
The word is derived from the local words panch (Haryanvi: पंच, lit. 'five') and kula (Haryanvi: कुला, lit. 'canals') meaning "the city of 5 canals", possibly referring to five irrigation canals that distribute water from the Ghaggar River and these kuls pass through the Chandimandir Cantonment area to Mata Mansa Devi Mandir area. Kuls or canals were made along the contours of the hillocks in a way that they collect the water upstream and convey it downstream at the contour height higher than the actual level of the Ghaggar river at the same spot. One of the canals is called the Singh Nalla which was being beautified in 2021 by building a walking track and by planting plants and flowers.

== History ==
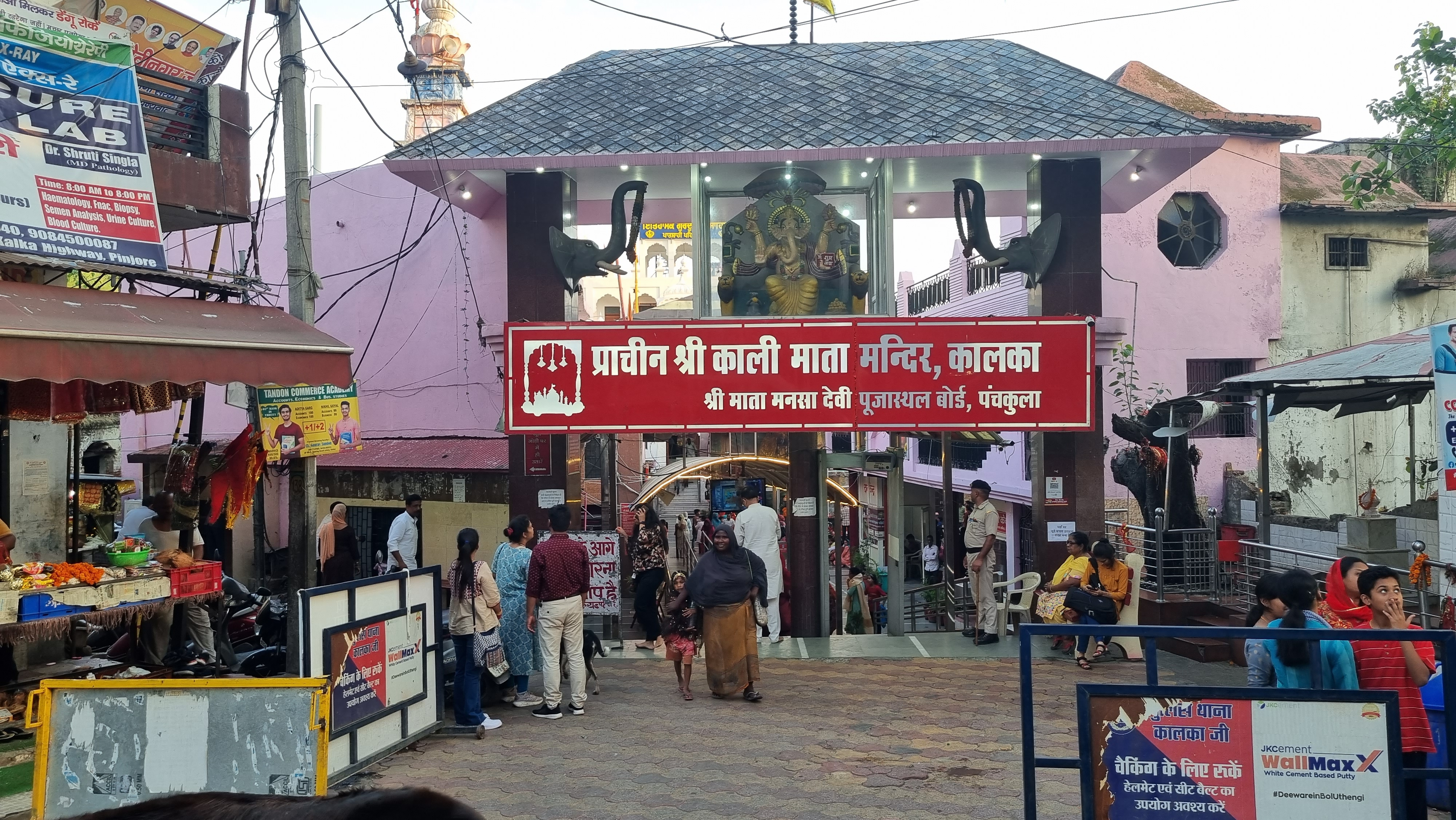
Kalimata Temple in Kalka, Panchkula

The city is named after Panchkula village, which is situated on the Ambala Kalka highway, near the junction with the Chandigarh road. The city was planned and developed by the state of Haryana in the 1970s. Panchkula was supposed to be the capital.

=== Ramgarh Fort ===
The fort was built by the rulers of Kahlur State, the headquarters of which was Bilaspur in Himachal Pradesh. The King of Bilaspur built the Ramgarh Fort 360 years ago. In 1687, its rulers offered Guru Gobind Singh a horse, a sword, and Rs 500,000 when he was relocating his troops from Paonta Sahib to Anandpur Sahib after the Battle of Bhangani. In the 1750s, it eventually fell to the status of a fief under the Sirmur State, but became independent again in 1804. It is currently occupied by the progeny of Kalee Chand, younger son of King of Bilaspur Sangar Chand (r. 1197–1220), and runs as a heritage hotel.

=== Mata Mansa Devi Temple ===
Mata Mansa Devi Mandir is a Hindu temple dedicated to Goddess Mansa Devi, a form of Shakti, in the Panchkula district of Haryana state in India. The temple complex is spread over 40 hectares (100 acres). It is one of the prominent Shakti Pitha temples of North India involving seven Shakti goddesses, namely Mata Mansa Devi, Naina Devi, Jawalamukhi, Chintpurni, Brajeshwari, Chamunda Devi and Jayanti Devi. Nearby is the Saketri Shiv Mandir, a historic temple dedicated to Lord Shiva and a popular pilgrimage site, especially during Maha Shivratri. Thousands of devotees visit the shrine from various parts of the country, and especially during the Navratra mela, this number rises to hundreds of thousands every day for the nine auspicious days.

=== State museum ===
Haryana State Museum at Punchkula has a 7 story building with 12 themed galleries, such as the pre-historic, proto-historic (Sindhu-Saraswati civilisation), Vedic period, early historic (e.g. Kushan), medieval (e.g. Sultanate period), British colonial, and modern period housing artifacts excavated from archaeological sites in Haryana such as Rakhigarhi (artifacts and skeletons), Agroha mound, Sugh, Karsola, and Kunal, etc. There is a theatre with immersive AR/VR exhibits, conference hall, kids corner, cafe, and souvenir shop.

== Geography and climate ==
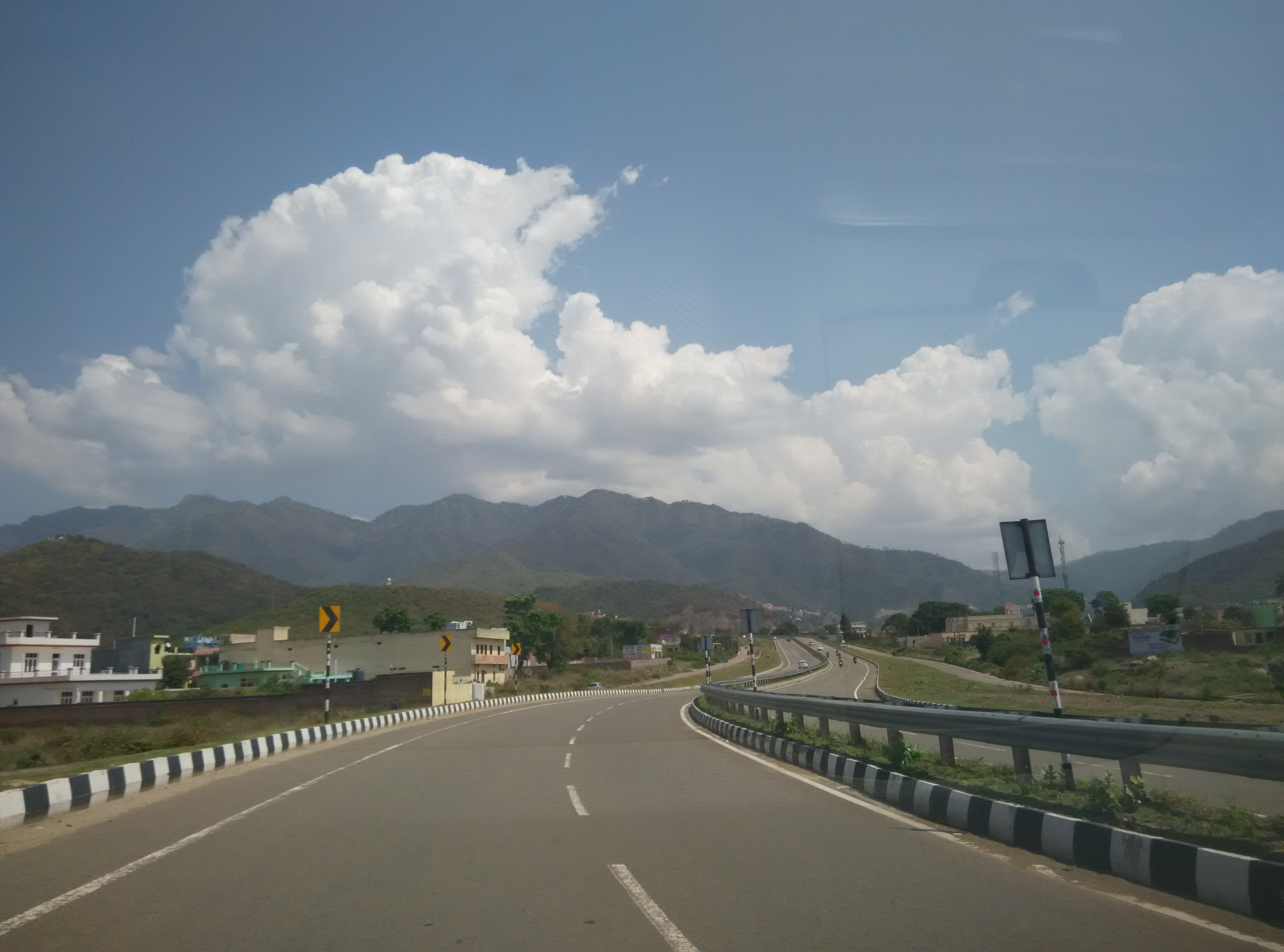
Himalayan Expressway, a section of NH5, near Panchkula

Panchkula district has a sub-tropical continental monsoon climate with hot summers, cool winters, and monsoon rainfall. It has great variation in temperature (−1 to 43 °C [30 to 109 °F]). Sometimes winter frost occurs during December and January. The district also receives winter rains from the western disturbance. The rainfall is mostly received in the monsoon. Morni hills constitute the highest point of the district as well as of Haryana. The Ghaggar is the only perennial river, which is very shallow outside of the monsoons. The mountains and hills of Kasauli are clearly visible from Panchkula.

Generally, the slope of the district is from northeast to southwest, and in this direction, most of the rivers/streams rain-fed torrents flow down and spread much gravel and pebbles in their beds. Only the Sirsa River, in Kalka Tehsil flows towards the northwest. The soils in the district are mainly light loam.

The underground water in the district is generally fresh and suitable for domestic and irrigation purposes. The underground water level is generally high in the southern parts and low in the north and northeast which is a hilly tract. The district lies in the Himalayas boundary fault zones and earthquakes of moderate to high intensity have occurred in the past.

=== Average temperature ===
- Spring: It lasts from February-end to early April. Temperatures vary from (max) 13 to 20 °C (55 to 68 °F) and (min) 5 to 12 °C (41 to 54 °F).
- Autumn: In autumn (from September-end to mid-November.), the temperature may rise to a maximum of 30 °C (86 °F). Temperatures usually remain between 10 and 22 °C (50 and 72 °F) in autumn. The minimum temperature is around 6 °C (43 °F).
- Summer: The temperature in summer (from mid-April to June-end) may rise even above 40 °C (104 °F). Temperatures generally remain between 30 and 39 °C (86 and 102 °F).
- Monsoon: During the monsoon season (from early July to mid-September), Panchkula receives moderate to heavy rainfall and sometimes heavy to very heavy rainfall (generally during the month of August or September). Usually, the rain-bearing monsoon winds blow from southwest/southeast. The city mostly receives heavy rain from the south (which is usually a persistent rain) but it generally receives most of its rain during monsoon either from the northwest or the northeast. The maximum amount of rain received by the city of Panchkula during monsoon season was 195.5 mm (7.70 in) in a single day.
- Winter: Winters (November-end to February-end) are mild but it can sometimes get quite chilly in Panchkula. Average temperatures in the winter remain at (max) 5 to 14 °C (41 to 57 °F)and (min) −1 to 5 °C (30 to 41 °F). Rain usually comes from the west during winters and it is usually a persistent rain for 2–3 days, sometimes with hail-storms.

== Demographics ==
Religion in Panchkula City
Religion	Percent
Hinduism	91.30%
Sikhism	4.84%
Islam	2.30%
Others	1.56%

According to the 2011 Census of India, the people of the city are overwhelmingly Hindu, with Sikh and Muslim micro minorities.

In 2011, Panchkula had 48,772 households in the city, with a population of 211,355, of which male and female were 111,731 and 99,624 respectively.

== Government and politics ==
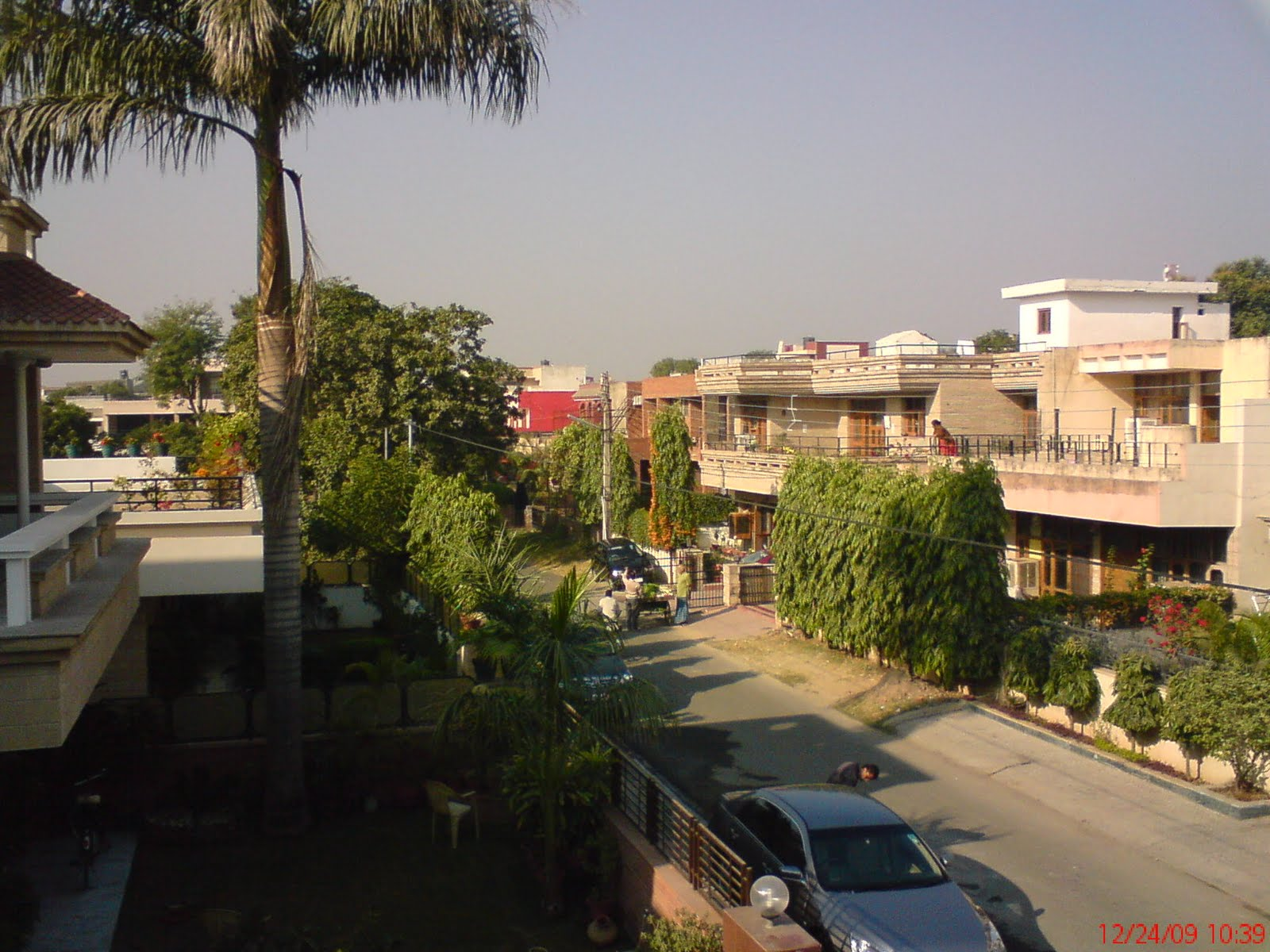
A street in Sector 17

The city is a part of the Ambala Lok Sabha constituency represented by INC's Varun Chaudhary, and the Panchkula State Assembly constituency, represented by INC's Chander Mohan since 2024.

=== City administration ===
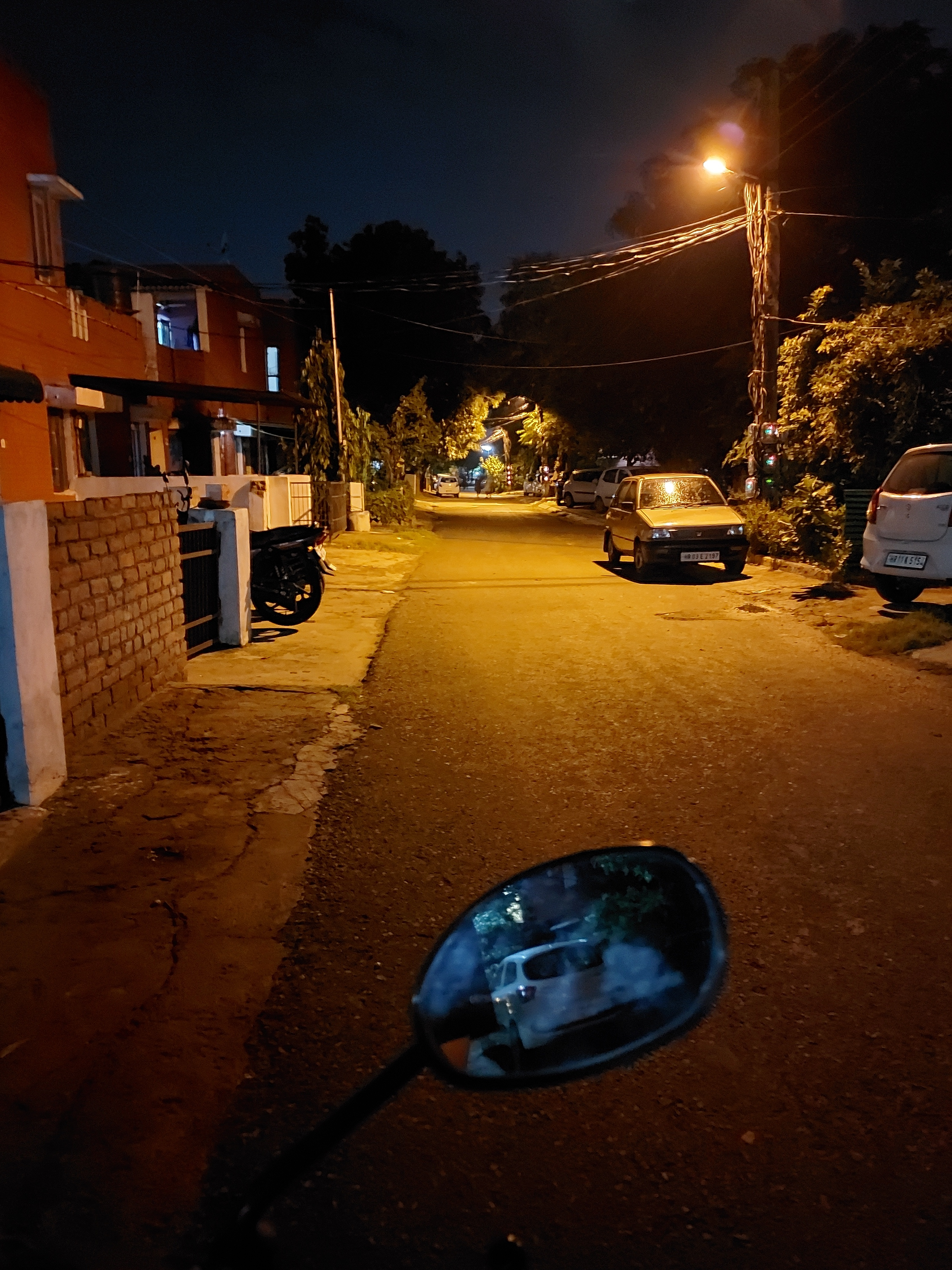
Street in Sector 11

Panchkula municipality is governed under the Haryana Municipal Act, 1973. According to the 2011 Census, Panchkula is governed by a municipal council, but it has since upgraded to the status of a municipal corporation. The population of the municipality, as per Census 2011, is 210,175.

Since 2017, Rajesh Jogpal (HCS) headed the corporation as its municipal commissioner. In December 2019, he was transferred and replaced by IAS Sumedha Kataria. The first woman Mayor of Panchkula was Upinder Kaur Ahluwalia, who served the term from 2013 to 2018. In 2018, the state decided to hold direct elections for the post, and as of now, the mayor of Panchkula is Kulbhushan Goyal of BJP. In a closely contested mayoral election in Panchkula, Bharatiya Janata Party's Kulbhushan Goyal trumped the Congress’ Upinder Kaur Ahluwalia by 2,057 votes.

BJP also secured a majority in the 20-member municipal corporation House by winning 11 seats along with its alliance partner Jannayak Janata Party. Congress won seven seats, and two went to Independent candidates.

In July 2020, the Panchkula Municipal Corporation was bifurcated, with Kalka and Pinjore separating from the corporation and getting their own municipal council status. The city is divided into 20 wards for the purpose of administration, and is built over an area of 32.6 km^{2} (12.6 sq mi).

=== Civic utilities ===
Water supply and sewerage in Panchkula is maintained by Haryana Urban Development Authority (HUDA), the Public Health and Engineering Department (PHED) of the state, as well as the municipal corporation at the local level. As of 2008, 80 MLD of water is supplied to Panchkula city, and it is treated by chlorination.

Panchkula also produces 115 metric tons (115,000 kg; 254,000 lb) of waste per day, out of which only about 40 t (40,000 kg; 88,000 lb) is processed. As per the National Institute of Urban Affairs (NIUA) report, 100% door to door collection has been ensured in all wards through waste pickers. Jhariwala village has a sanitary landfill for the waste, where unsegregated waste is dumped. The city also has a community composting facility, material recovery facility, and biogas plant. As of 2008, the city generated 64 MLD of sewage and had three sewage treatment plants (STPs) that were functional with a capacity of 18, 39 and 15 MLD respectively.

Panchkula city has an interim master plan that has been published by the Town and Country Planning Department of Haryana state.

== Economy ==
=== Employment ===
Panchkula IT Park (also known as Haryana State Industrial and Infrastructural Development Corporation Technology Park) is the state-of-the-art infrastructure to facilitate information technology in the city. It spreads over 74 acres developed by HSIIDC situated in sector 22 on the foothills of Shivalik Hills or outer Himalayas and on the banks of the Ghaggar River. It is well connected to Delhi, Haryana, Punjab, and Himachal Pradesh.

=== Tourism ===
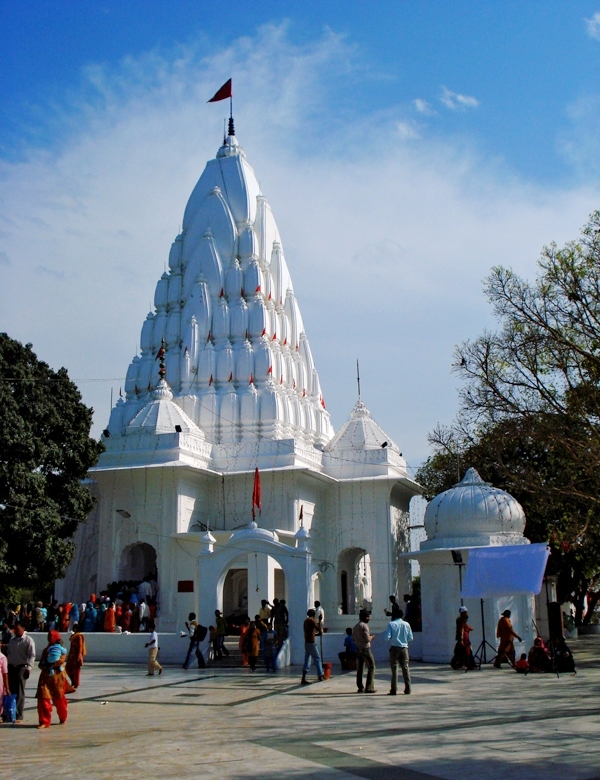
Patiala temple, constructed in 1840 AD by Maharaja of Patiala, within the Mansa Devi temple complex in Panchkula

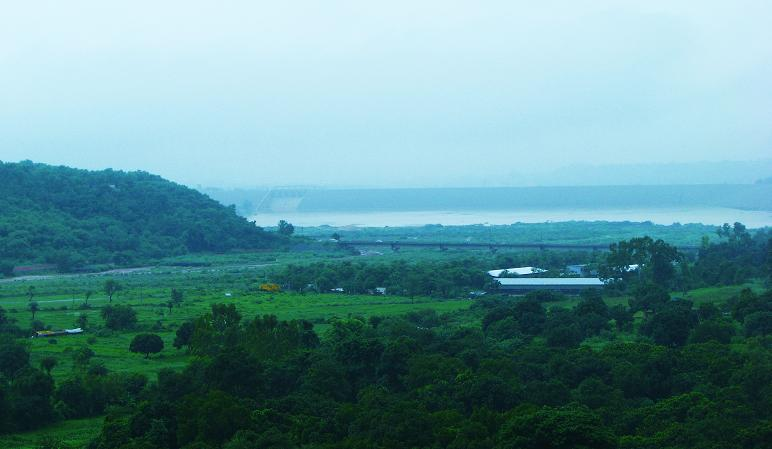
Kaushalya Dam

There are various tourist attractions in and around Panchkula, including:

- Mata Mansa Devi Mandir is one of the most prominent temples in North India and is dedicated to Goddess Mansa Devi, a form of Shakti.
- Bhima Devi Temple Site Museum, nicknamed Khajuraho of North India for its erotic sculptures, comprises the restored ruins of an ancient Hindu temple dating from between the 8th and 11th century AD.
- Nada Sahib is a Sikh Gurudwara in the Panchkula district of the Indian state of Haryana. Situated on the banks of the Ghaggar-Hakra River in the Sivalik Hills.
- Morni, the hill resort at Morni Hills, an offshoot of the Sivalik Hills, are about 45 kilometres (28 mi) from the city. The hills were named for Queen Morni, who is said to have ruled this city.
- Pinjore Gardens, also known as Yadavindra Gardens, are about 20 km (12 mi) from the city and cover a total area of 100 hectares (250 acres). The work of creating the gardens began in the seventeenth century. Pinjore Gardens is the venue for an annual mango festival. The garden houses a mini zoo, historic places, a Japanese garden, a nursery, and a number of picnic spots. According to Hindu theology, the Pandava brothers rested in Pinjore during their exile.
- National Cactus and Succulent Botanical Garden and Research Centre a 7 acres (2.8 ha) cactus garden in the center of Panchkula, was established in 1987 and is known for its rare and endangered species of Indian succulent plants.
- Kaushalya Dam is an earth-filled barrage dam on the Kaushalya river in Pinjore. It is an important wetland that is home to many endangered migratory birds.
- Bir Shikargah Wildlife Sanctuary, Khol Hi-Raitan Wildlife Sanctuary, Pheasant Breeding Centre, Morni, Jatayu Conservation Breeding Centre, Pinjore, Pheasant Breeding Centre, Berwala.

== Sports ==
Panchkula has its own Sports Complex in Sector 3 includes Tau Devi Lal Cricket Stadium, Panchkula Golf Course, Olympic Athletic Track, and other multi-purpose facilities for sports.

Tau Devi Lal Cricket Stadium has a cricket stadium, badminton hall, football ground, athletic Track, and accommodation facilities for the sportsperson. It also boasts of a state-of-the-art modern international standard Astroturf laid Hockey Stadium with lights for eager hockey enthusiasts.

Panchkula Golf Course was set up in 2003 over 135 acres of land. This 18-hole golf course is located in sector 3 in the foothills of Shivalik Hills on the banks of the Ghaggar River, just off the Himalayan Expressway.

== Education ==
=== Colleges ===
- National Institute of Fashion Technology, Sector 23
- Government College, Panchkula Sector 1
- Government College for Girls, Panchkula Sector 14
- Govt. Polytechnic Panchkula
- Mother Teresa Saket College of Physiotherapy, Chandimandir Cantonment
- State Institute of Engineering & Technology, Panchkula.

=== BSEH affiliated school ===
- Shri Jainendra Gurukul Sr Sec School, Panchkula, Sector 1, (Established 1929)

=== CBSE affiliated school ===
- The Bharat School, Panchkula, Sector 8
- Amravati Vidyalaya Senior Secondary School, Amravati Enclave
- Army Public School, Chandimandir Cantonment
- Bhavan Vidyalaya, Sector 15
- Blue Bird, Panchkula, Sector 16
- CL DAV, Sector 11
- DAV Public School, Panchkula, Sector 8
- DC Model Senior Secondary School, Sector 7
- Doon Public School, Sector 21
- Hallmark Public School, Sector 15
- Hansraj Public School, Sector 6
- Haryana Model School, Sector 10
- Holy Child School, Morni Rd
- Jainendra Public School, Sector 1
- Kendriya Vidyalaya No. 1 (KV1), Chandimandir Cantonment
- Kendriya Vidyalaya No. 2 (KV2), Chandimandir Cantonment
- Litera Heritage School, Sector-14, Ext.-2, Panchkula
- Manav Mangal School, Sector 11
- New India Smart School, Sector 15
- St. Soldier Divine Public School, Sector 16
- Satluj Public School, Sector 4
- Shishu Niketan, MDC, Sector 5
- The Gurukul, Sector 20
- The Sky World School, Sector 21

=== CISCE affiliated schools ===
- Little Flower Convent School, Sector 14
- St. Xavier's High School, Panchkula, Sector 20
- Saupin's School, Sector 9

== Healthcare ==
=== Government run hospitals ===
- Command Hospital, Chandimandir Cantonment
- General Hospital, Panchkula Sector 6
- Government Pet Animal Medical Center Cum Teaching Hospital, Sector 3
- Saket Orthopedic Hospital, Sector 1

=== Private hospitals ===
- Alchemist Hospital, Sector 21
- Alchemist Eye Institute, Sector 21
- Ameerpet Dental Hospital, Sector 16
- Blessings Hospital, Sector 15
- Cloudnine Hospital, Sector 5, Panchkula
- Chakravarty Nursing Home, Sector 10
- Charitable Diagnostic Centre, Sector 4
- Clove Dental, Sector 20
- Dhawan Hospital, Sector 7
- Drishti Eye Hospital, Sector 10
- Gokul Surgical Hospital, Sector 15
- Gulmohar IVF & Fertility centre, Sector 7
- Happy Family Hospital, Sector 5 MDC
- Institute of Reproduction & Child Cares, Sector 17
- Ivy Hospital, Sector 5C MDC
- Jindal Nursing Home, Sector 17
- Kare Partners Mother And Child Hospital, Sector 2
- Malhotra Super Specialty Hospital, Sector 25
- Mind Peace Clinic Sector 14
- Mirchia Hospital Sector 15
- Noheria Nursing Home, Sector 8
- Ojas Hospital, Sector 26
- Orthomax Hospital, Sector 15
- Paras Hospital, HSIIDC Park, Sector 22
- Paras Bliss Hospital Sector 5 MDC
- Phoenix Hospital, Sector 16
- Raffles Hospital, Panchkula Sector 14
- Sunny Hospital, Sector 4
- Wings Hospital, Sector 25

== Notable people ==
- Meenakshi Chaudhary - Indian actress, model and beauty pageant winner
- Dolly Guleria - Punjabi folk and Sufi singer, daughter of Nightingale of Punjab Padma Shri awardee Surinder Kaur
- Ved Prakash Malik - four star general who commanded the Indian Army during the Kargil War
- B.S. Sandhu - former director general of police, Haryana

== See also ==
- Ajitgarh
- Amar Ujala
- Zirakpur
