= 48 kos parikrama =

Hindu Pilgrimage

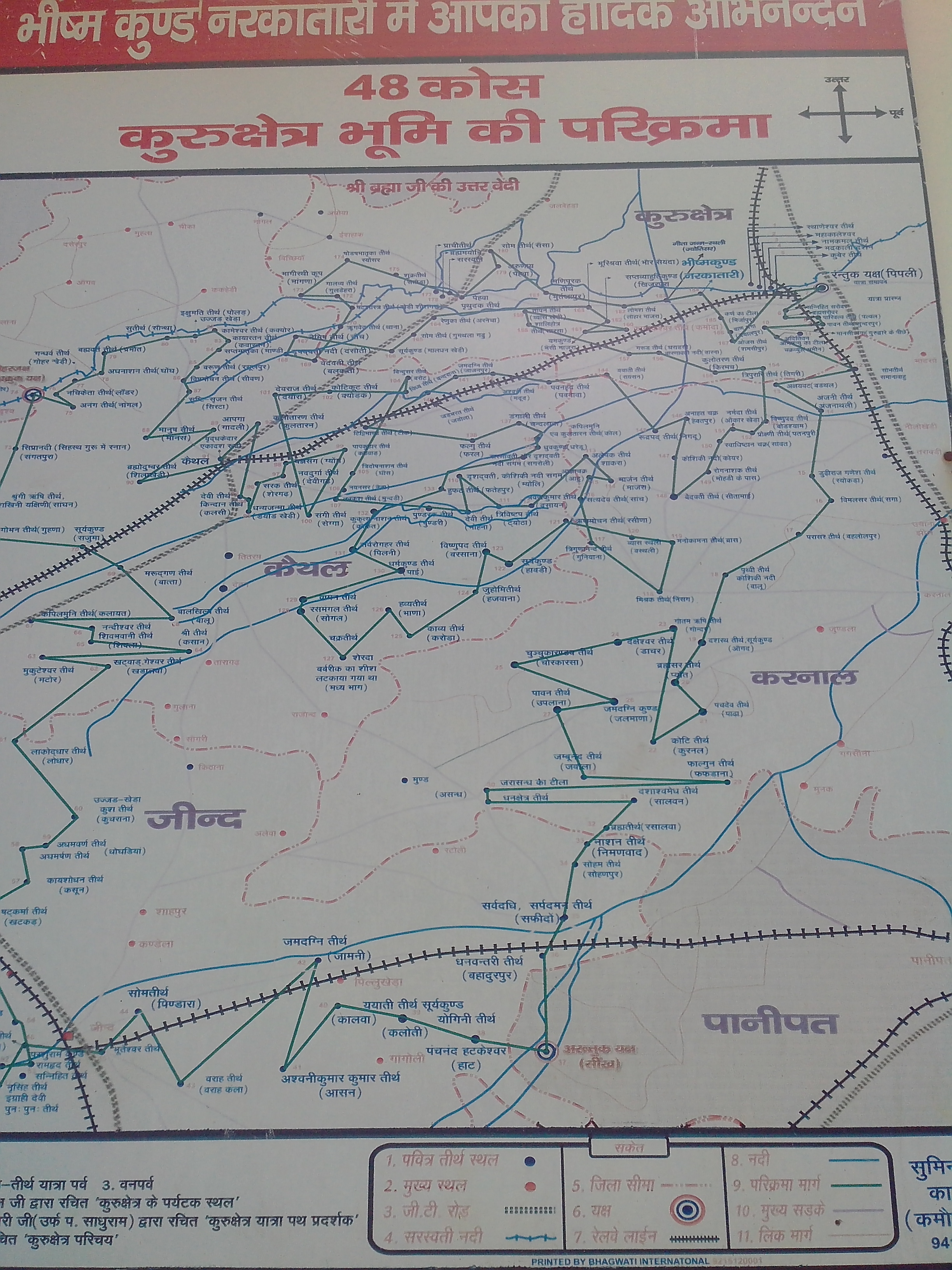
Map of the 48 kos parikrama (approx. 96 miles circle) around Kurukshetra (at Ban Ganga/Bhishma Kund)

The 48 kos parikrama is a parikrama (a circumbabulatory pilgrimage) of various Mahabharata-related and other Vedic-era tirthas (Hindu sacred sites) around the Hindu holy city of Kurukshetra in the state of Haryana, India.

Associated with Krishna and the Mahabharata, it is an important place of pilgrimage for Hindus. It is one of three major pilgrimages related to Krishna in North India, the others being the "Braj parikarma" in Mathura in Uttar Pradesh state and "Dwarka parkarma" at Dwarkadhish Temple in Gujarat state.

== Kurukshetra Development Board ==
Kurukshetra Development Board (KDB) was established to develop the 48 Kos Parikrama of Kurukshetra, its tirthas and related activities.

== Main sites ==
=== Hindu pilgrimage ===
Brahma Sarovar is the focal site of this circuit, which can be subdivided into various other itineraries. At least 182 Mahabharta era pilgrimage sites have been identified within the 48 kos parikrama.

Within Kurukshetra, along with Brahma Sarovar, other important sites are Jyotisar (place of "Gitaupadesha" - the first Upadeśa or discourse of Bhagavad Gita by Krishna) and Sannihit Sarovar (Hindu genealogy registers of Kurukshetra are kept here). Pilgrims also visit the Bhishama kund, Surya kund and Sthaneshwar Mahadev Temple (where Pandavas along with Krishna prayed to Shiva to receive his blessings for victory in the battle of Mahabharata)

In addition, pilgrims also visit Pehowa, where the most revered sites are Saraswati tirtha and Prithudak tirtha. Pehowa is an ancient city and its religious significance is mentioned in several puranas, such as Skanda Purana (1st to 5th century CE), Markandeya Purana (4th to 6th century CE) and Vamana Purana (5th to 11th century CE).

In Yamunanagar district, Kapal Mochan (Kapal Mochan (visited by Rama) and Sri Sarasvati Udgam Tirath at Adi Badri (place where deified mother goddess Sarasvati is revered because the sacred Sarasvati River enters the plains from the foothills of shivalik range) are also important sacred sites.

Many pilgrims like to trace their genealogy going back hundreds of generation, trace prior visits by their ancestors and record their own visit in the Hindu genealogy registers of Kurukshetra and Hindu genealogy registers of Pehowa maintained by Pandas (professional genealogists).

List of most important sacred sites

- Kurukshetra: Brahma Sarovar, Sthaneshwar Mahadev Temple, Sannihit Sarovar, Jyotisar, Hindu genealogy registers of Kurukshetra
- Pehowa: Saraswati tirtha and Prithudak tirtha
- Yamunanagar district: Kapal Mochan and Adi Badri

=== Buddhist pilgrimage ===
Buddha had visited Sthaneshwar and gave discourse on the banks of Brahma Sarovar where a Bodh Stupa was built. Stupa has five structures of brunt brick, first three from Kushana period, 4th from Gupta period, and the last from Verdana period and later medieval period. During Harshavardhana reign, a 3 meters wide compound wall was built.

For the Buddhist pilgrims, the most important sites are Brahma Sarovar and the Bodh Stupa on its northwestern flank. Other Buddhist pilgrimage sites nearby Buddhist sites include Chaneti, Topra, and Adi Badri Sharirika stupa. Many pilgrims prefer to follow the path taken by Buddha along Grand Trunk Road in Haryana. Stupas, pagodas and places in the order of travel by Buddha are:

- From Mathura in Uttar Pradesh, Buddha travelled along Grand Trunk Road in Haryana (also see Buddhist pilgrimage sites in Haryana).
- Kamashpura Aastha Pugdal Pagoda (Kumashpur) in Sonipat city, the place where Buddha gave Mahasatipatthana sutta.
- Assandh Kushan stupa at Assandh in Karnal district
- Kurukshetra Stupa on the banks of sacred Brahma Sarovar in Kurukshetra city was also visited by Hieun Tsang,
- Topra between Kurukshetra and Yamunanagar, now has a large open air museum park housing several replica of Ashoka's edicts including largest Ashoka Chakra in the world, original site of Ashokan pillar which was moved to Feroz Shah Kotla in Delhi in 1356 CE by Firuz Shah Tughlaq.
- Srughna, now known as the Sugh Ancient Mound, on outskirts of Yamunanagar city
- Chaneti Buddhist Stupa, on outskirts of Yamunanagar city, according to Hieun Tsang it was built by the King Ashoka.

=== Sikh pilgrimage ===
Several Sikh gurus had visited Sthaneshwar, Pehowa and Kapal Mochan for the holy dip.

In Kurukshetra, Sikh pilgrims visit Brahma Sarovar and the "Gurudawara Pehli Patshai" (just next to Sthaneshwar Mahadev Temple on the south bank of Brahma Sarovar where the ninth Guru Tegh Bahadur stayed at). Following the trail of Sikh gurus, the pilgrims also visit Pehowa as well as Kapal Mochan. Kapal Mochan was visited by Guru Nanak and Guru Gobind Singh after Battle of Bhangani in 1688 CE.

Other important Sikh pilgrimage sites are Sadaura, Lohgarh (capital of Banda Singh Bahadur) and Badkhalsa in Sonipat (where Bhai Kushal offered his head to retrieve Guru Teg Bhadur's head beheaded by mughals so that it can be taken to Anandpur Sahib}.

=== Genealogy registers ===
Hindu genealogy registers of Kurukshetra are kept at Pehowa and Sannihit Sarovar.

=== Number of visitors ===
In 2019, over 40 lakh (4 million) people had attended the Gita Mahotsav festival in December.

== Tirtha development ==
Govt is undertaking steps to revive ancient Sarasati river, develop ghats and in-situ plantation of panchavati trees. Visitors facilities such as roads, shades, water, toilet, landscaping, parking, cafe, interpretation centres etc. are also being developed.

The Panchavati trees, are trees scared to Indian-origin religions, such as Hinduism, Buddhism and Jainism, such trees are the Vata (ficus benghalensis, Banyan), Ashvattha (ficus religiosa, Peepal), Bilva (aegle marmelos, Bengal Quince), Amalaki (phyllanthus emblica, Indian Gooseberry, Amla), Ashoka (Saraca asoca, Ashok), Udumbara (ficus racemosa, Cluster Fig, Gular), Nimba (Azadirachta indica, Neem) and Shami (prosopis spicigera, Indian Mesquite). See also sacred groves of India.

From June 2014 to July 2021, ₹31.48 crore have been spent by the Haryana government on the development and upgrade of 81 tirthas of '48-kos parikrama'. Improving the standard of cleanliness of tiraths has been raised an issue. Ghats, and visitor facilities, such as toilet, shelter, water, parking, etc. are being developed.

In 2021, it was announced that to develop Kurukshetra as a cultural hub, the by the Government of India will develop the Buddha Haryana circuit and a Sikh museum in Kurukshetra as all 10 Sikh gurus and Buddha had made yatra (pilgrimage) to Kurukshetra.

== List of pilgrimage sites in 48 kos parikrama ==
At least 134 Tirthas (sacred sites) have been identified. Some of the pilgrimages are listed below:

=== Tirthas of Kurukshetra district ===
1. Arunai tirtha, Arunai
2. Prachi tirtha, Pehowa
3. Saraswati tirtha, Pehowa
4. Brahmayoni tirtha, Pehowa
5. Prithudak tirtha, Pehowa
6. Shalihotra tirtha, Sarsa, Kurukshetra
7. Bhisma Kund, Narkatari
8. Ban Ganga, Dyalpur, Kurukshetra
9. Kulotaran Tirtha, Kirmich
10. Brahma Sarovar, Kurukshetra where Hindu genealogy registers are kept and Kurukshetra Panorama and Science Centre and Dharohar Museum are nearby.
11. Sannihit Sarovar, Kurukshetra:

12.Bhadrakali Temple, Kurukshetra
13. Aditi Tirtha and Abhimanyu ka Tila, Abhimanyupur
14. Jyotisar: The famous site where SGitaupadesha (Bhagavad Gita was revealed) to Arjuna under the tree.
15. Som Tirtha, Sainsa
16. Shukra Tirtha, Sataura
17. Galav Tirtha, Guldehra
18. Saptasarsvta Tirtha, Mangna
19. Brhma Tirtha (Brahma Sthan), Thana, Kurukshetra
20. Som Tirtha, Gumthala Garhu
21. Manipurak Tirtha, Murtjapur, Kurukshetra

22. Bhurishrava Tirtha, Bhor Saidan
23. Lomash Tirtha, Lohar Majra
24. Kamyak Tirtha, Kamauda
25. Aapga Tirtha, Mirjapur, Kurukshetra
26. Karan ka Tila, Mirjapur
27. Nabhikamal, Thanesar
28. Rantuk Yaksha, Bid Pipli
29. Sthaneshwar Mahadev Temple
30. Ojas Titha, Samsipur
31. Renuka Tirtha, Ranacha
32. Bhor Saidan

=== Tirthas of Jind district ===
32. Bhuteshwar tirtha, Jind
33. Ekhamsa tirtha, Ikkas
34. Ramhrad tirtha, Ramrai, Haryana
35. Sannehit tirtha, Ramrai
36. Pushkar tirtha, Pohkeri Kheri
37. Som tirtha, Pindara

38. Varahakalan tirtha, Braha Kalan
39. Ashwinikumar tirtha, Aasan, Haryana
40. Jamdagni tirtha, Jamni
41. Yayati tirtha, Kalwa, Haryana
42. Panchnanda tirtha (Hatkeshwar tirtha), Haat
43. Sarpadadhi tirtha, Safidon: by 2021 ₹1.08 crore was spent on Hansraj tirtha development at Safidon.
44. Hansraj tirtha, Safidon: by 2021 ₹1.08 crore was spent on tirtha development.
45. Khatwanesghwar, Narwana: by 2021 ₹1 crore was spent on tirtha development.

44. Sarpadaman tirtha, Safindon
45. Kayashodan tirtha, Kasuhan
46. Vamsamulam tirtha, Barsola
47. Khageshwar tirtha, Khadalwa
48. Ramsar tirtha, Kuchrana Kalan
49. Lohrishi/Lokodwar tirtha, Lodhar

=== Tirthas of Panipat district ===
50. Tarntauk Yaksha, Sinkh

=== Tirthas of Kaithal district ===
51. Pawanhrad tirtha, Pabnawa
52. Falgu tirtha, Faral
53. Pawaneshwar tirtha, Pharal
54. Kapil Muni tirtha, Kalayat
55. Pundrik tirtha, Pundri
56. Trivishtap tirtha, Tyontha
57. Kotikut tirtha, Kyodak / Keorak: by 2021 ₹1.02 crore was spent on tirtha development.

58. Banteshwar tirtha, Barot, Haryana
59. Namish tirtha, Nauch, Haryana
60. Vedvati tirtha, Balwanti
61. Vridkedar tirtha, Kaithal
62. Sarak tirtha, Shergarh, Kaithal
63. Manush tirtha, Manas, Kaithal
64. Navadurga tirtha, Devigarh, Kaithal
65. Gyaraharudri tirtha, Kaithal
66. Aapga tirtha, Gadli
67. Juhomi tirtha, Hajwana

68. Vishnupada tirtha, Barsana, Kaithal
69. Yajnasanjna tirtha, Geong
70. Kapilmuni tirtha, Kaul
71. Kulotaran tirtha, Kaul
72. Garhratheshwar tirtha, Kaul
73. Matri tirtha, Rasulpur, Kaithal
74. Suryakunda tirtha, Habri (Jyotinagar colony): by 2021 ₹67 lakh was spent on tirtha development, more budget will be spent as it was still in the initial stage of development.
75. Havya tirtha, Bhana
76. Chakramani tirtha, Sherda: by 2021 ₹1 crore was spent on tirtha development, second phase of which was still underway.
77. Rasamangal tirtha, Songhal: by 2021 ₹1.30 crore was spent on development of Kukrityanshan and Rasamangal tirhtas. Ghats conference hall, toilet were built.

78. Mukteshwar tirtha, Mator, Kaithal: by 2021 ₹1.92 crore was spent on tirtha development.
79. Sritirtha, Kasan, 80. Srikunja tirtha, Banpura
81. Ekshumati tirtha, Theh Polar partially excavated ancient archaeological mound associated with the rishi Pulastya.
82. Sutirtha tirtha, Sontha
83. Brahmavarta tirtha, Brabhavat
84. Aruntak Yaksha, Beharjaksha

85. Sringi Rishi tirtha/ Shankhni Devi tirtha, Sangan
86. Gobhwan tirtha, Guhana
87. Suryakunda, Sajuma
88. Seetvan/Swaragdwara tirtha, Siwan, Kaithal
89. Brombhodumber tirtha, Shila Kheri
90. Anyajanma tirtha, Deoda Kheri
91. Devi tirtha, Kalsi, Kaithal
92. Dhruvakunda tirtha, Dherdu
93. Kukrityanashan tirtha, Kaukat: by 2021 ₹1.05 crore was spent on development of Kukrityanshan and Rasamangal tirthas.

94. Kavya tirtha, Karoda
95. Lavakusha tirtha, Mundri
96. Vamana tirtha, Sounghal
97. Rinmochan tirtha, Rasina 98. Alepak tirtha, Shakra
99. Devi tirtha, Mohna
100. Gandharva tirtha, Gohran Kheri

=== Tirthas of Karnal district ===
101. Vedvati tirtha, Sitamai
102. Mishrak tirtha, Nisang
103. Aahan tirtha, Nigdu
104. Trigunananda tirtha, Guniyana
105. Pawan tirtha, Uplana
106. Jambunand tirtha, Jabala
107. Dasshswamedha tirtha, Salwan, Karnal
108. Dhankshetra tirtha, Assandh
109. Jarasandha ka kila, Assandh
110. Vimalsar tirtha, Saga, Karnal
111. Dasaratha tirtha/Raghvendra tirtha/Surya kund, Aaugandh
112. Prithavi tirtha, Balu, Karnal

113. Parashar tirtha, Bahalolpur
114. Daksheshwar tirtha, Dachar
115. Vyasa Sthali, Basthali
116. Goutam rishi/ Gavendra tirtha, Gondar, Karnal
117. Brahma tirtha, Sawant, Karnal
118. Akshyavata tirtha, Badthal
119. Falgu tirtha, Fafdana

120. Jyesthashrama tirtha, Borshyam

121. Koti tirtha, Borshyam
122. Surya tirtha, Borshyam
123. Vishnuhrad (Vishnupad) Vamnak tirtha, Borshyam

124. Brahma tirtha, Rasalwa

125. Anjani tirtha, Anjanthali

126. Jamdagni tirtha, Jalmana

127. Sudin and Narvada tirtha, Omkar ka Khera

128. Tripurari tirtha, Tigri, Karnal

129. Som tirtha, Samana Bahu

130. Chuchukaranva tirtha, Chorkarsa

131. Koti tirtha, Kurnal

132. Panchdeva tirtha, Pada, Karnal
: by 2021 ₹64 lakh was spent on tirtha development for construction of five ponds, a ghat and shelter.

133. Prokshini tirtha, Patnapuri

134. Kaushiki tirtha, Koyar

135. Kultaran tirtha, Karsa Dod

== Festivals ==
Majority of the tourists visit Kurukshetra during sacred events, specifically Somvati Amavasya, solar eclipse, Gita Mahotsav and to perform post-death rituals only.

=== Gita Mahotsav ===
International Gita Mahotsav (on varying dates in November or December based on the Vikram Samvat lunar calendar), Saraswati Jayanti (also known as the Vasant Panchami, on the fifth day of spring around February or March) and Holi festivals are celebrated at Brahma Sarovar every year. During the International Gita Mahotsav, more than 300 national and international stalls are set up around the Brahma Sarovar. First ever International Gita Mahotsav was organised in 1989.

=== Gita Deepotsav ===
Jyotisar is one of the important site where the Gita International Festival is held every year in December. This also entails a Gita Deepotsav (Gita festival of lights) during which hundreds of thousands of traditional earthen diya lamps are lit on the banks of Brahma Sarovar, Sannihit Sarovar and Jyotisar Sarovar. For example, 300,000 lamps were lit in December 2020.

=== Revival of tirtha festivals ===
Historically each of more than 134 tirthas in the 48 Kos Parikrama of Kurukshetra used to have its own unique festival. With passage of time, several of this tirthas have faded into oblivion and several such festivals have become extinct. To conserve the religious and cultural heritage these tirtha-specific festivals and fairs will be revived. This will also boost the local economy. In order to revive, the Kurukshetra Development Board (KDB) is identifying the fairs and religious events held at each tirthas (pilgrimage sites).

=== Kurukshetra Prasadam - Channa laddu speciality prasadam ===
Just like Mathura peda as prasāda (consecrated food offered as blessing) is a specialty of Braj Krishna circuit in Mathura area, the sweet laddu made from the roasted channa (Indian chichpea) will be used as the geo-specialty food prasāda of various tirthas within 48 kos kurukshetra prikarma. This will be called Kurukshetra Prasadam. Compared to other sweets such as barfi or peda, the laddu does not spoil easily and has a longer shelf life at room temperature. Kurukshetra Development Board (KDB) has advised all the sweet shops if any tourist or pilgrim asks for prasad then only chana laddoo must be given. KDB will open 5 shops of its own to sell channa laddu as Kurukshetra Prasadam.

== See also ==
General

- Hindu pilgrimage sites in India

Krishna related pilgrimages

- Vraja Parikrama
- Dwarka

Other religious

- Adi Badri, Haryana
- Dhosi Hill
- Kapal Mochan
- Hindu pilgrimage sites in India
- Famous Hindu yatras
- List of Hindu festivals
- Padayatra
- Ratha Yatra
- Tirtha
- Tirtha and Kshetra

Vedic era

- King Kuru
- Cemetery H culture
- Painted Grey Ware culture
- Historicity of the Mahabharata
