= Jyotisar =

Hindu pilgrimage site in India

- Location within Haryana Location within India
- Location: Kurukshetra, Haryana
- Coordinates: 29°57′41″N 76°46′16″E
- Basin countries: India

The holy Banyan Tree, which is believed to have witnessed Krishna delivering the sermon of the Bhagavad Gita

Jyotisar, located on the bank of the Jyotisar Sarovar wetland, is a Hindu pilgrimage site in the city of Kurukshetra in the Haryana state of India. According to Hindu tradition, Krishna delivered the sermon of the Bhagavad Gita—the doctrine of Karma and Dharma—to his wavering friend Arjuna here to help him resolve his ethical dilemma and revealed his vishvarupa (universal form) to him.

Adi Shankara, an 8th-century Hindu scholar, identified Jyotisar as the exact place where Krishna delivered the Bhagavad Gita.

Jyotisar is part of the Krishna circuit which connects it with destinations like Vrindavan, Barsana, Govardhan, Mathura, Dwarka, and Bhalka.

== Background ==
=== Etymology ===
In this context, 'Jyoti' means light or enlightenment, while 'Sar' means the core or essence. Hence, 'Jyotisar' translates to the 'core meaning of light' or the 'essence of enlightenment'.

=== Association with the Mahabharata ===
According to the Mahabharata, Krishna delivered his sermon to Arjuna at Jyotisar, revealing the Bhagavad Gita beneath a vat vriksh (banyan tree). The banyan tree is considered a sacred tree in Indian-origin religions such as Hinduism, Buddhism, Jainism, and Sikhism. A local banyan tree, traditional considered an offshoot of the original tree under which Krishna preached, stands on a raised plinth at the site.

The site also features an old Shiva temple where the Kauravas and Pandavas are said to have worshipped. Other notable attractions in Kurukshetra include the Dharohar Museum, Kurukshetra Panorama and Science Centre, and the Shrikrishna Museum.

== Jyotisar religious heritage tourism project ==
The Jyotisar tirth is maintained by the Kurukshetra Development Board. The Krishna Circuit Kurukshetra development project is a joint venture between the Government of Haryana and India's Ministry of Culture. It focuses on upgrading several historical sites in and around Kurukshetra, including Brahma Sarovar, Sannihit Sarovar, Narkatari Baan Ganga, Abhimanyu Ka Tila, and a Mahabharata-themed park. Phase I, budgeted at ₹250 crore, includes the construction of the Jyotisar Anubhav Kendra—a Bhagavad Gita and Mahabharata museum with five themed galleries, multiple outdoor statues, and infrastructure development across the 48 kos ki Kurukshetra parikrama circuit. Phase II involves widening the revived Sarasvati River channel from Pipli to Jyotisar.

As part of the National Krishna Yatra circuit, the 48 Kos Kurukshetra region and its 134 pilgrimage sites are being developed along the lines of the Braj Kosi Yatra. Under this national project, the Union Government of India and respective state governments are also constructing two mega temples dedicated to Lord Krishna: one in Vrindavan spanning 65 acres at a cost of ₹800 crore (US$120 million) and another in Bangalore at a cost of ₹700 crore (US$105 million).

=== Mahabharata light and sound show ===
The tourism department organizes a daily laser, light, and sound show at Jyotisar Lake that recreates major episodes from the Hindu epic Mahabharata.

=== Bhagavad Gita and Mahabharata museum ===
The heritage project features a high-tech digital and virtual reality Bhagavad Gita and Mahabharata theme museum at Jyotisar. The newly constructed 100,000-square-foot facility is designed to accommodate an expected daily footfall of 10,000 pilgrims.

To promote international religious tourism, this project includes the construction of eight buildings on the banks of the ancient Jyotisar Lake. Each 4- to 5-story building will feature distinct interactive exhibits dedicated to different phases of the 18-day Mahabharata war. The total cost of the project is estimated at ₹200 crore (US$30 million at 2018 prices).

=== Mahabharata era statues ===
Several monumental bronze and marble statues depicting figures from the Mahabharata are being installed across the district.

==== Gitopdesh – Gita Updesh statue ====
A marble chariot statue depicting Krishna preaching to Arjuna stands at the site to commemorate the revelation of the Bhagavad Gita.

==== Sri Krishna Virat Swaroop statue at Jyotisar ====
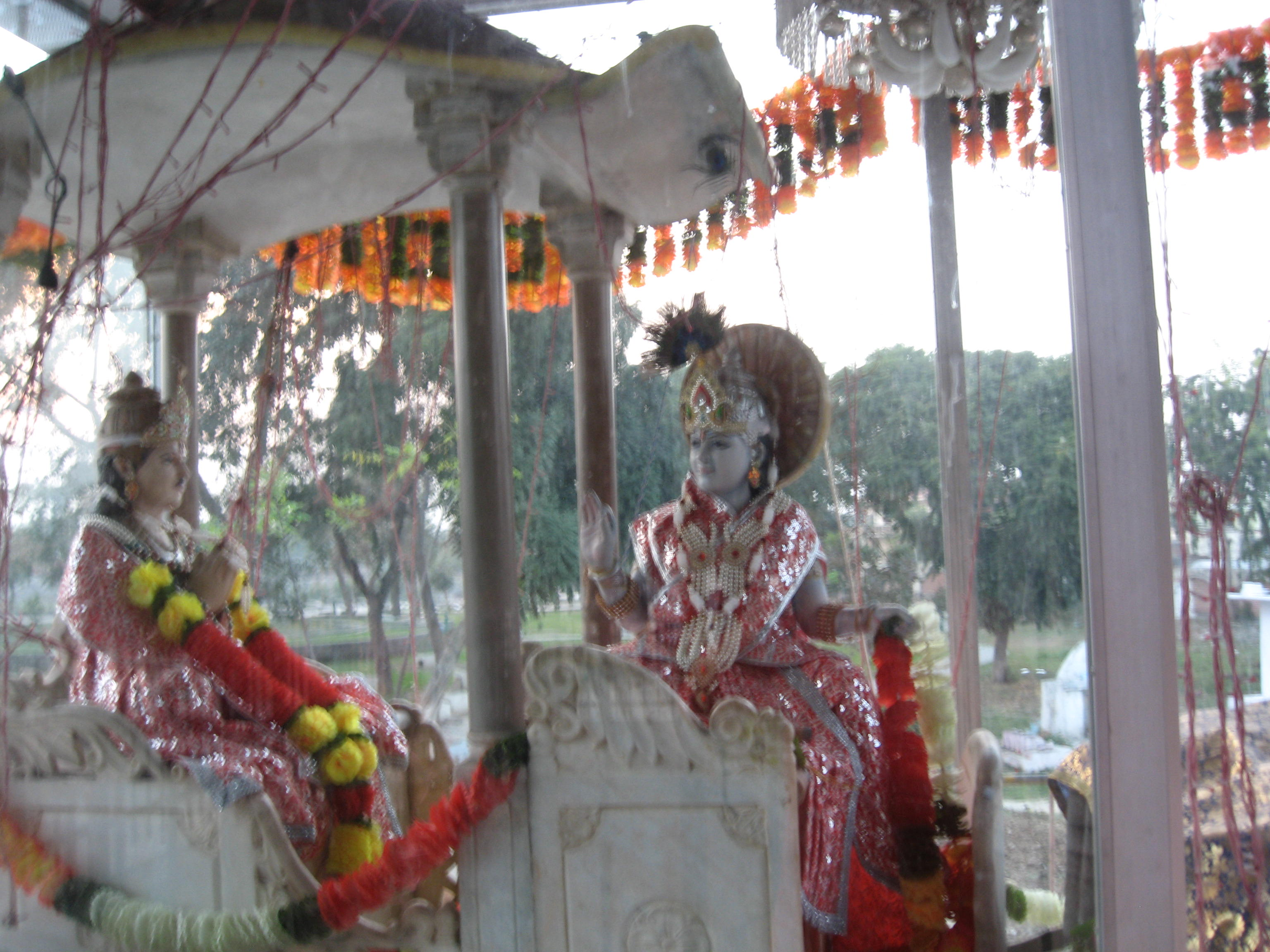
The marble chariot monument at Jyotisar

In 2021, a 40-foot-tall statue of Krishna's cosmic form, cast in ashtadhatu (an alloy of eight sacred metals), was installed at Jyotisar. Placed atop a 10-foot plinth, the project cost approximately ₹10 crore (US$1.3 million). It was designed by Ram V. Sutar, the renowned sculptor behind Gujarat's 182-metre Statue of Unity. The icon features nine heads—including those of Krishna, Shiva, Ganesha, the Narasimha avatar of Vishnu, Sugriva, Hanuman, Parashurama, and Agni—sheltered beneath a canopy formed by the multi-headed serpent Shesha.

==== Abhimanyu Chakravyūha statue at Abhimanyupur ====
An 18-foot bronze statue of Abhimanyu has been erected at Abhimanyupur (historically the site where he died in battle). It depicts him raising a chariot wheel above his head in defense during the Chakravyūha formation. The Kurukshetra Development Board completed the project in 2020 at a cost of ₹24 lakh; it forms the centerpiece of an 8-acre commemorative park layout mimicking the Chakravyūha grid.

==== Bhishma Deathbed and Arjuna's Banganga statue at Narkatari ====
At nearby Narkatari, located between Jyotisar and Kurukshetra city, a twin-statue installation valued at ₹32 lakh depicts the final moments of Bhishma. The installation includes a 9-foot statue of Arjuna poised to strike the earth with an arrow to release a holy freshwater spring to quench the dying warrior's thirst, alongside an icon of Bhishma resting upon his sarsaiya (bed of arrows).

=== Pipli-Jyotisar Sarasvati riverfront project ===
This initiative involves widening and beautifying the channel of the Sarasvati River—a sacred watercourse celebrated in the Rigveda—stretching 21 km (70,000 ft) from Pipli to the Sutlej Yamuna Link Canal (SYL canal) east of Jyotisar. Following efforts to make the upstream sections at Adi Badri perennial, the local channel is being expanded to prevent seasonal urban flooding and support riverfront heritage tourism.

The channel measures 20 m (66 ft) wide near the Pipli Zoo along NH-44, but narrows downstream to between 4.6 and 9.1 m (15 and 30 ft) due to illegal encroachments. This bottleneck severely reduces flow capacity from 1,000 cusecs to just 200 cusecs, flooding northern Kurukshetra during the monsoon. Demarcation and anti-encroachment notices were issued by the Haryana Sarasvati Heritage Development Board in early 2021 to clear a uniform 70-foot-wide pathway. Riverfront improvements include public ghats, open-air gyms, and cafeterias, with local boating lines running initially from Pipli to Kheri Markanda before extending to Jyotisar.

=== Sacred Banyan tree ===
Saplings cultivated from the historic Jyotisar banyan tree are prepared and distributed for ceremonial planting across India and international destinations.

=== Current status ===
Phase I infrastructure updates were ongoing through 2025.

== Religious observance ==
=== Kurukshetra Prasadam – Channa laddu specialty prasadam ===
Mirroring the tradition of Mathura peda across the neighboring Vraja circuit, a signature laddu roasted from split desi channa (chickpeas) serves as the official geo-specialty prasāda (blessed food offering) across the 48 kos Kurukshetra parikrama shrines. Marketed formally as Kurukshetra Prasadam, chickpea flour laddus offer a resilient shelf life compared to dairy-based sweets like barfi. The Kurukshetra Development Board regulates local sweet shops to ensure uniformity and operates five dedicated outlets distributing the official prasadam to incoming pilgrims.

=== Gita International Festival and Gita Deepotsav ===
Jyotisar serves as a focal center for the annual International Gita Mahotsav held every December. The celebrations culminate in the Gita Deepotsav (festival of lights), during which hundreds of thousands of traditional earthen diya lamps are illuminated along the stone embankments of Brahma Sarovar, Sannihit Sarovar, and Jyotisar Sarovar; over 300,000 lamps were recorded lit during the December 2020 festival.

== See also ==
- List of Museums in Haryana
- Hindu pilgrimage sites in India
- List of Hindu temples
- Religious tourism in India
