= Religious tourism in India =

Religious tourism in India is a focus of Narendra Modi's national tourism policy. Uttarakhand has been popular as a religious and adventure tourism hub.

== Tourism by religion ==
=== India-origin religions ===
Since India is birthplace of Indian-origin religions, namely Hinduism, Jainism, Buddhism, and Sikhism, their holiest sites and highest concentration of religious sites pertaining to these religions are in India. Common pilgrim circuits, sites and practices are as follows:

- Parikrama pilgrim circuits and sites
- Pilgrim yatras and sites
- Sacred rivers and their ghats, notably Ganges, Yamuna, Sarasvati, Narmada
- Fairs, such as Kumbh Mela.

==== Buddhism ====
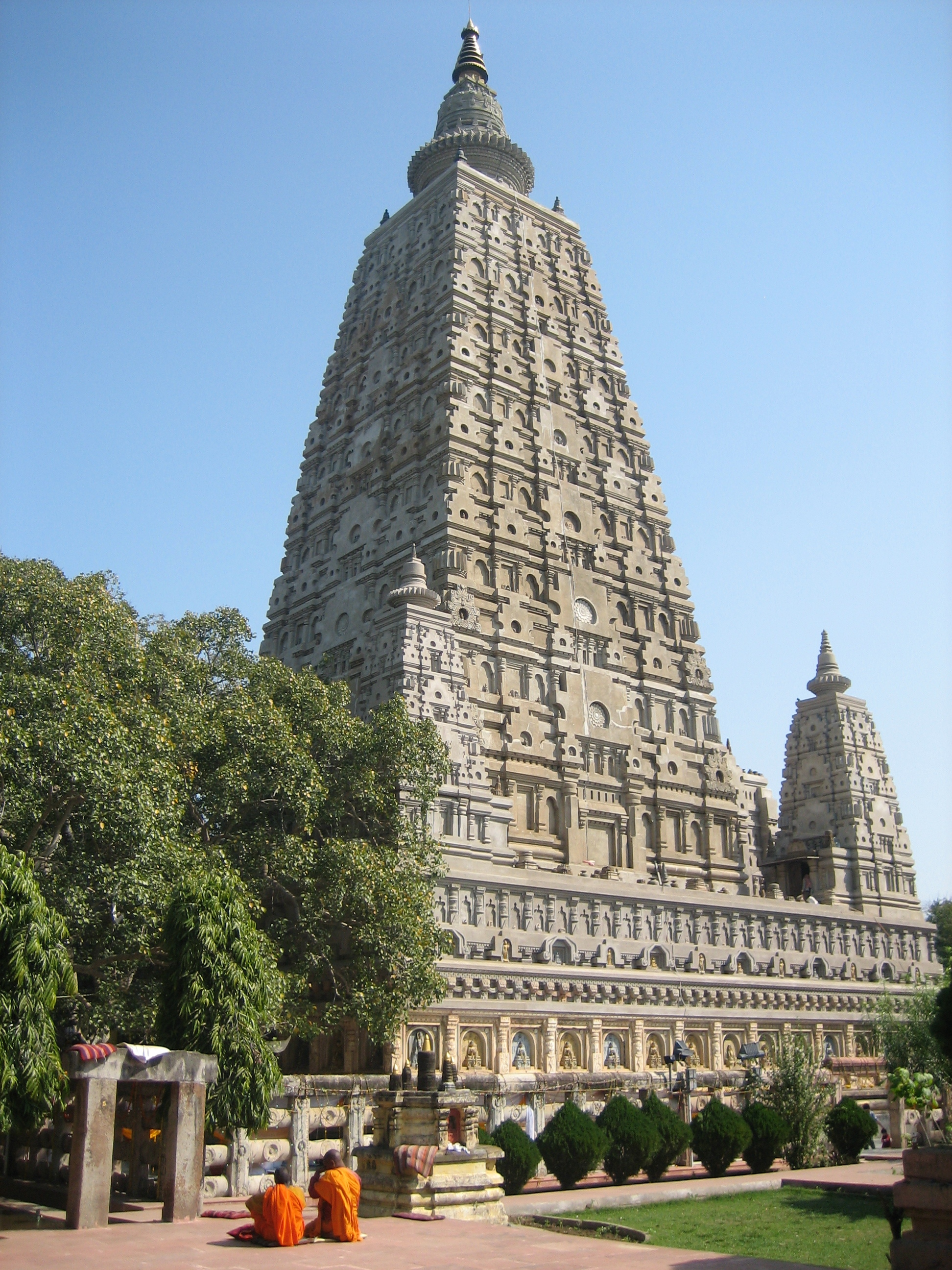
Mahabodhi Temple

The Mahabodhi Temple in Bodh Gaya is one of the holiest sites in Buddhism. Buddhist sites, many related to the travels of Buddha, are spread across India. Important Buddhist prikarma sites are, Bodh Gaya, Sarnath, Sravasti (Jetavana), Rajgir hills, Kurukshetra (Bodh Stupa on bank of Brahma Sarovar, pilgrimage undertaken by Gautama Buddha), Shrughna (Yamunanagar, vihara visited by Buddha for sermon), Adi Badri (saraswati udgam sthal and vihara visited by Buddha), Parinirvana Stupa (place of death and nirvana of Lord Buddha at Kushinagar, and Sankissa. See also Buddhist pilgrimage sites.

==== Hinduism ====
Hindus pilgrims in India undertake yatra (pilgrimage) to numerous sites, temples and samadhis (shrines) of saints) for puja and parikrama to earn punya with the aim to attain moksha. In order of importance for pilgrims in India, there are 4 Dhams (Char Dham) and 12 Jyotirlings devoted to the Lord Shiva, 51 Shakti Pithas devoted to the feminine manifestation of the god, and the important Lord Rama circuit (Ayodhya, Chitrakoot, Hampi and Rameswaram) and Lord Krishna circuit (Mathura, Vrindavan, Barsana, Govardhan, Kurukshetra, Dwarka and Bhalka). Sacred pilgrim sites related to Lord Rama are Ayodhya, Prayagraj, Chitrakoot, Hampi and Rameswaram. Sacred pilgrim sites related to Lord Krishna are Mathura, Vrindavan, Barsana, Govardhan, Vraja Parikrama, 48 kos parikrama of Kurukshetra, Dwarka, Bhalka (place of death of Lord Krishna).

India has become a major destination for yoga tourism, bringing business to ashrams in places such as Mysore (for Ashtanga Yoga) and Rishikesh (for Sivananda Yoga, among others). That has led to the creation of many yoga schools offering teacher training and promotion of India as a "yoga tourism hub" by the Indian Ministry of Tourism and the Ministry of AYUSH.

==== Jain ====
The holiest site of Jainism are spread across India.

==== Sikhism ====
The Golden Temple is the holiest site in Sikhism.

The holy sites for Sikhs include the following in the order of importance:

- Panj Takht, namely Golden Temple, Takht Sri Patna Sahib, Nanded Hazur Sahib, Takht Sri Damdama Sahib Bhatinda, and Anandpur Sahib.
- Guru Nanak related places, he was the founder of Sikh religion. His birth and death places at Gurdwara Janam Asthan and Kartarpur Corridor (both in Pakistan) are considered sacred.
- Sikh martyrs's related sites who gave their lives for protecting dharma and Sikhism. These include Gurudwara Sis Ganj Sahib and Fatehgarh Sahib of martyrdom of Guru Tegh Bahadur and children of Guru Gobind Singh respectively by Muslim rulers for refusing to convert to Islam
- Place where Sikh gurus performed pilgrims and travels: Kurukshetra, Kapal Mochan, Paonta Sahib, etc.
- Capitals of important Sikh states: Lahore (capital of largest Sikh state of Maharaja Ranjit Singh) and Lohgarh (capital of Sikh state founded by Baba Banda Bahadur in Yamunanagar). Fateh Burj at Chapar Chiri where Banda bahadur defeated mughals in Battle of Chappar Chiri and avenged murder of Sikh gurus and their children is also considered important.

=== Foreign-origin religions ===
==== Baháʼí ====
The roots of the Baháʼí Faith in India go back to the first days of the Bábí religion in 1844. For Baháʼís in India, the Lotus Temple in Delhi, is most well known Baháʼí House of Worship that was dedicated in December 1986.

==== Islam ====
The dargahs or shrines of major Sufi figures in India, such as Ajmer Sharif and Nizamuddin, attract many Muslims. Qadian is a considered a holy city by Ahmadi Muslims.

==== Zoroastrianism ====
Due to persecution of Zoroastrians, in other countries and the liberal atmosphere and patronisation of India, today the largest population of Zoroastrians resides in India.

Zoroastrians, the practitioners of Zoroastrianism have been living in India since the Sasanian period (224-651 CE), started to migrate to India in successive waves migrations after the Muslim invasion of Persia when invading Muslim started religious persecution and Zoroastrianism suffered a decline in Iran, later another wave of migration to India started when Safavids forced their subjects to convert to Shiism. Zoroastrians in India, have numerous fire temples in India where they travel for worship. Udwada Atash Behram is the oldest fire temple in India The temple attracts Zoroastrian pilgrims from around the world and considered the most sacred for Zoroastrians.

== List of Important Places ==
MAP of Places
Sr	Place	Deity	Importance
1	Sharda Peeth, POK	Sharada	Shaktipeeth
2	Nankana Sahib, Pakistan		Sikh
3	Kartarpur Sahib, Pakistan		Sikh
4	Amarnath Temple, Pahalgam, JK		Hindu
5	Vaishno Devi Temple, Karta, JK		Hindu
6	Dharamshala		Buddhist
7	Jwalamukhi, Kangra	Jwalamukhi	Shaktipeeth
8	Amritsar	Golden Temple	Sikh
9	Anandpur Sahib		Sikh
10	Talwandi Sabo		Sikh
11	Kurukshetra	Krishna	Gita
12	Behat	Shakambari	Shaktipeeth
13	Haridwar		Saptapuri, Kumbha Mela
14	Rishikesh		
15	Yamunotri		Chota Dham
16	Gangotri		Chota Dham
17	Kedarnath	Shiva	Jyotirlinga, Chota Dham
18	Badrinath	Vishnu	Char Dham, Chota Dham, Swayambhu Vishnu
19	Garbyang	Adi Kailash	
20	Kailash, Tibet	Shiva	
21	Delhi	Nizamuddin, Lotus Temple, Akshardham	Muslim, Bahai, Hindu
22	Vrindavan		Krishna Circuit
23	Mathura		Saptapuri, Krishna Circuit
24	Naimisharanya	Vishnu	Swayambhu Vishnu
25	Ayodhya	Rama, Hanumangarhi	Saptapuri, Rama Circuit, Hanuman
26	Lumbini, Nepal		Buddhist
27	Muktinath, Nepal	Shaligram Vishnu	Swayambhu Vishnu
28	Pashupati, Nepal	Pashupatinath	Shiva
29	Kushinagar		Buddhisht
30	Prayagraj	Alopi Sankari, Hanuman	Shaktipeeth, Kumbha Mela, Hanuman
31	Chitrakoot		Rama Circuit
32	Sarnath		Buddhist
33	Varanasi (Kashi)	Kalbhairav, Vishalakshi & Vishveshwar, Hanuman	Saptapuri, Shaktipeeth, Jyotirlinga
34	Patna	Mahavir Hanuman, Takht Sri Harimandir	Sikh, Hanuman
35	Pawapuri		Jain
36	Rajgir		Buddhist, Jain
37	Gaya	Mangla Gauri	Shaktipeeth
38	Bodhgaya		Buddhist
39	Parasnath		Jain
40	Baidyanath		Jyotirlinga
41	Kamakhya	Maa Kamakhya	Shaktipeeth
42	Tripura Sundari, Tripura	Mahadevi Raj Rajeshwari Lalita Tripura Sundari	Hindu, Shaktipeeth
43	Pandua, West Bengal	Maa Shrinkhala	Shaktipeeth
44	Kolkatta	Maha Kali	Shaktipeeth
45	Jajpur	Birajadevi	Shaktipeeth
46	Bhubaneswar	Lingaraj Temple	Swayambhu Hari Har
47	Puri	Jagannath & Vimala	Char Dham, Shaktipeeth.
48	Purusottampur	Maa Tara Tarini	Shaktipeeth
49	Pithapuram	Kukkuteswara, Dattatreya	Shaktipeeth, Sripad Vallabha
50	Draksharama	Bheemeswara	Shaktipeeth
51	Tirupati	Venkateshwara	Swayambhu Vishnu
52	Kanchipuram	Kamakshi	Saptapuri, Shaktipeeth
53	Srimushnam	Bhuvarahswamy	Swayambhu Vishnu
54	Tiruchirappalli	Ranganath Swamy	Swayambhu Vishnu
55	Rameshwaram	Shiva, Panchamukhi Hanuman	Jyotirlinga, Char Dham, Hanuman
56	Koneshwaram, Sri Lanka		Shaktipeeth
57	Nanguneri	Vanamamalai Perumal	Swayambhu Vishnu
58	Chamundeshwari, Mysuru	Chamundeshwari	Shaktipeeth
59	Hampi		Rama circuit
60	Alampur	Jogulamba	Shaktipeeth
61	Srisailam	Mallikarjun & Bhramaramba, Dattatreya	Jyotirlinga, Shaktipeeth, Narsimha Saraswati
62	Kurvapur, Raichur	Dattatreya	Sripad Vallabha
63	Kudalasangama	Basaveshwar	Lingayat
64	Ganagapura	Dattatraya	Narsimha Saraswati
65	Manikanagara	Dattatraya	Manik Prabhu
66	Akkalkot	Dattatreya	Swami Samartha
67	Tuljapur	Bhavani Mata	Shaktipeeth
68	Pandharpur	Vithoba Rukmini	
69	Shikhar Shingnapur	Shambhu Mahadev	Shiva
70	Narsobawadi	Dattatreya	Narsimha Saraswati
71	Mahalaxmi Kolhapur	Ambabai Mahalaxmi	Shaktipeeth
72	Pali, Satara	Khandoba	
73	Janai Malai Satara	Devi	
74	Mahad	Varadavinayak Ganesha	Astavinayak
75	Harihareshwar	Hari Har, Kalbhairavnath	Swayambhu
76	Pali, Raigad	Ballaleshwar Ganesha	Astavinayak
77	Kalaj	Khandoba	
78	Jejuri	Khandoba	
79	Morgaon	Mayureshwar Ganesha	Astavinayak
80	Siddhatek	Siddhivinayak Ganesha	Astavinayak
81	Theur	Chintamani Ganesha	Astavinayak
82	Ranjangaon	Mahaganapati	Astavinayak
83	Ozhar	Vigneshwar Ganesh	Astavinayak
84	Lenyadri	Girijatmaj Ganesh	Astavinayak
85	Bhimashankar		Jyotirlinga
86	Mumbai	Siddhi Vinayak, Mahalaxmi	
87	Udvada	Iranshah Atash Behram	Parsi / Zoroastrian
88	Trimbakeshwar		Jyotirlinga
89	Nashik	Panchavati	Rama Circuit, Kumbha Mela
90	Saptshrungi		Shaktipeeth
91	Shirdi	Sai Baba	
92	Shani Shingnapur	Shanidev	
93	Ellora	Grishneshwar	Jyotirlinga
94	Ambejogai	Yogeshwari	
95	Nanded		Sikh
96	Aundha Nagnath		Jyotirlinga
97	Mahur	Renuka	Shaktipeeth
98	Shegaon	Gajanan Maharaj	
99	Omkareshwar		Jyotirlinga
100	Ujjain	Mahakal, Mahakali	Jyotirlinga, Shaktipeeth, Saptapuri, Kumbha Mela
101	Palitana		Jain
102	Somnath		Jyotirlinga
103	Girnar	Dattatreya, Neminatha	
104	Dwarka	Nageshwar, Dwarkadish	Char Dham, Saptapuri, Jyotirlinga
105	Ajmer	Ajmer Sharif	Sufi Saint
106	Pushkar	Varah Swamy	Swayambhu Vishnu

== See also ==
- Tourism in India
