= Kuchrana Kalan =

Village in Haryana, India

Coordinates: 29°29′33″N 76°18′04″E

Kuchrana Kalan is a historical village in the Jind district of the Indian state of Haryana. It is known for its religious significance and reference to a Mahabharat instance. Ramsar Tirth, located in the village is visited by pilgrims every year especially during the Gita Mahotsav.

Kuchrana kalan is situated in Alewa tehsil of Jind District. Nearby villages are Chattar, Kuchrana Khurd, Ghogharian, Karsindu, and Badhana. Nearest railway station is around 16km at Uchana.
