= Bhuteshwar Temple =

Religion
- Affiliation: Hinduism
- District: Jind
- Deity: Lord Shiva

Location
- Location: Jind
- State: Haryana
- Country: India
- Interactive map of Bhuteshwar Temple

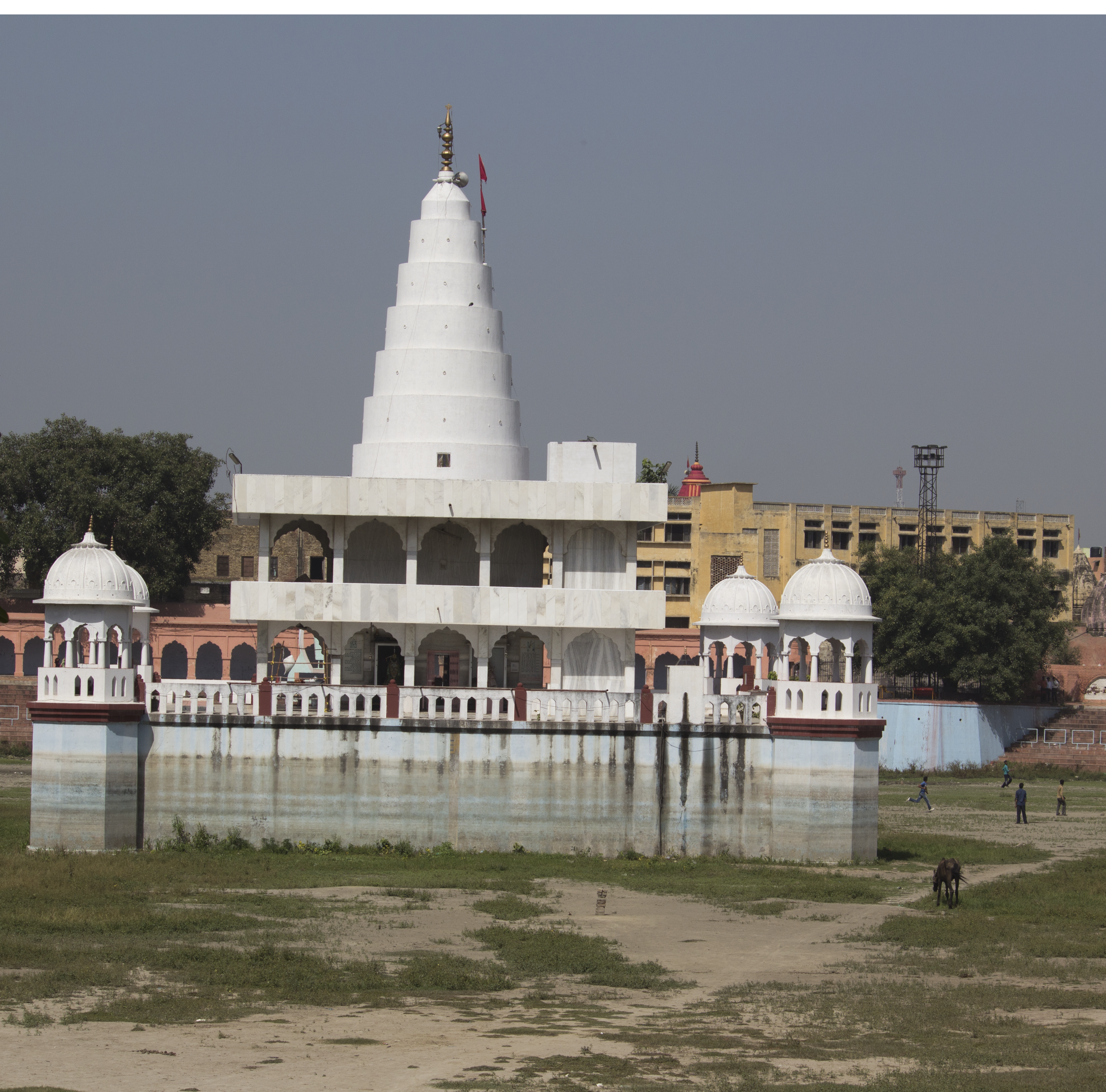
Bhuteshwar Temple

Bhuteshwar Temple is a Hindu temple in Jind, Haryana, in the series of 48 kos parikrama of Kurukshetra, dedicated to Bhuteshwar, a manifestation of Shiva. It was built by Raghbir Singh. Because it has a large water tank all around it is also called Rani Talab (meaning Queen Pond) .
