= Karoda =

Karoda Karora
- Location in Rajasthan, India
- Coordinates: 27.87°N 76.37°E
- Country: India
- State: Rajasthan
- District: Alwar

Government
  - Sarpanch: सुरेखा मनोज जांगिड़
- Elevation: 312 m (1,024 ft)

Population (2011)
  - Total: 4,128
  - Density: 1,000/km^{2} (2,600/sq mi)

Languages
  - Official: Hindi
- Time zone: UTC+5:30 (IST)
- PIN: 301 020
- Telephone code: 91 1494
- Vehicle registration: RJ-02

Karoda is a gram panchayat of Behror Tehsil. Karoda situated on State Highway No-14, Near By Barrod Village.

The village have approximately 4,100 population in 2011 census. Literacy is approximately 80%.

== Geography ==
It has an average elevation of 312 metres (1,024 ft). Sabi river is the famous river which cross village from two sites this. A large bridge is situated on Sabi River, from west bank to east bank across the river.

Karoda is a small industrial place. There are two international beer/ Beverages factories.

- Global Wine & Spirits Pvt.Ltd.
- Pernod Ricard India Pvt. Ltd.

== Demographics ==
Karoda village is situated on the bank of Sabi river. Here people of near by villages come for picnic. Baba Thadesar Tempel is the famous and 450-year-old temple. Baba Raj Nath singh is the Head of Hanuman Temple.

== Nearby places ==
- Barrod
- Sodawas
- Nalpurr
- Ajmeripur
