= Nising =

Nissing
- Town
- Country: India
- State: Haryana
- District: Karnal

Languages
  - Official: Hindi
- Time zone: UTC+5:30 (IST)
- Vehicle registration: HR05
- Website: haryana.gov.in

Nissing or Nissang is a town near Karnal, Haryana (India) on Karnal-Kaithal highway.
