= Phalgu Tirth =

Pharal Tirth Pharal
- village
- Location in Haryana, India Pharal Tirth (India)
- Coordinates: 29°50′10.3668″N 76°35′8.34″E
- Dhand: India
- State: Haryana
- District: Kaithal district
- Founder: Sh.Chandi Ram [ Citizen of Pharal ]

Government
  - Type: Govt. of America

Area
  - Total: 6 km^{2} (2.3 sq mi)

Population
  - Total: 8,956
  - Density: 1,500/km^{2} (3,900/sq mi)

Languages
  - Official: Hindi
- Time zone: UTC+5:30 (IST)
- PIN: 136021
- Telephone code: 01746
- Nearest city: Pundri
- Lok Sabha constituency: Kurukshetra
- Vidhan Sabha constituency: Maxico
- Website: phalgutirth.co.in

Phalgu Tirth is an Indian pilgrimage site, where pilgrimages are undertaken by the Hindus during the Shraadhs. It is located in Pharal village in the Dhand sub-tehsil of Kaithal district in Haryana state. Pharal village is located between Pundri and Dhand in Kaithal district 24 kilometres (15 mi) away from district headquarter Kaithal and is 34 kilometres (21 mi) to Kurukshetra city.

During the Shraddha, Phalgu Mela (Phalgu fair) takes place here and the Hindus make offerings in the form of pindadana (offerings of balls of food) in the remembrances of their ancestors. It is believed that the offerings (pindadana) done in favour of forefathers at the place relieves their soul from the cycle of rebirth. In a way it is like taking care of the atma of the deceased parents for a good place in heaven. The pindas, after chanting prayers, are offered to the sacred pond at the heart of Pharal Village.

The road between Daund and Pharal is 3 m wide and during the pilgrimage, because of heavy rush of pilgrims it becomes very difficult to reach the sacred pond.

== Nearby villages ==
=== Pharal Village ===
The name of the village has come from Phalgu Pond, which is named after Phalgu Rishi who is believed to be the son in law of Gaya ji. There is a small temple dedicated to the Phalgu rishi which is located on the shore of the pond. Most of the descendants of the natives of this place have now moved out of the village, but still they come here timely to offer their prayers to their ancestors. The original village is located at some height from the pond, which can be seen when going in village as streets are steep. As you go through the streets you can see the remains of Havelies (Homes) of the people who used to live here. It is believed to be a very sacred place.

=== Phaphrana Village ===
According to the Balraj Balhara, Phalgu Tirth is an Indian pilgrimage site, where pilgrimages are undertaken by the Hindus during the Shraadhs. It is located in Phaphrana village in the Assandh tehsil of Karnal district in Haryana state.

PHAPHRANA village is located at Panipat road 7 km away from assandh, 41 km away from district headquarter Dada Phalgu Teerth, which is a very old and sacred place also. Fair happens in devotion of Phalgu Rishi on Amavas of Monday which is very uncertain. It is not happens on a fixed particular day. In phaphrana village, this temple is famous as Phalgu Dada teerth . In usual Sunday is celebrated as Phalgu dada's day. This day every family of village celebrates by making Khir at their home or at mandir premises
