= Sannihit Sarovar =

Lake in India

- Location within Haryana Location within India
- Location: Old Kurukshetra city, Haryana
- Coordinates: 29°58′00″N 76°50′09″E
- Basin countries: India

Sannihit Sarovar is a sacred water reservoir in the Kurukshetra district of Haryana, India. It is believed to be the meeting point of seven sacred Sarasvatis. The sarovar, according to popular belief, contains sacred water. Bathing in the sacred waters of the tank on the day of Amavasya (night of complete darkness), or on the day of an eclipse is believed to bestow blessings equivalent to performing the ashvamedh yajna.

== See also ==
- Vraja Parikrama
