= Sthaneshwar Mahadev Temple =

Coordinates: 29.981°N 76.828°E

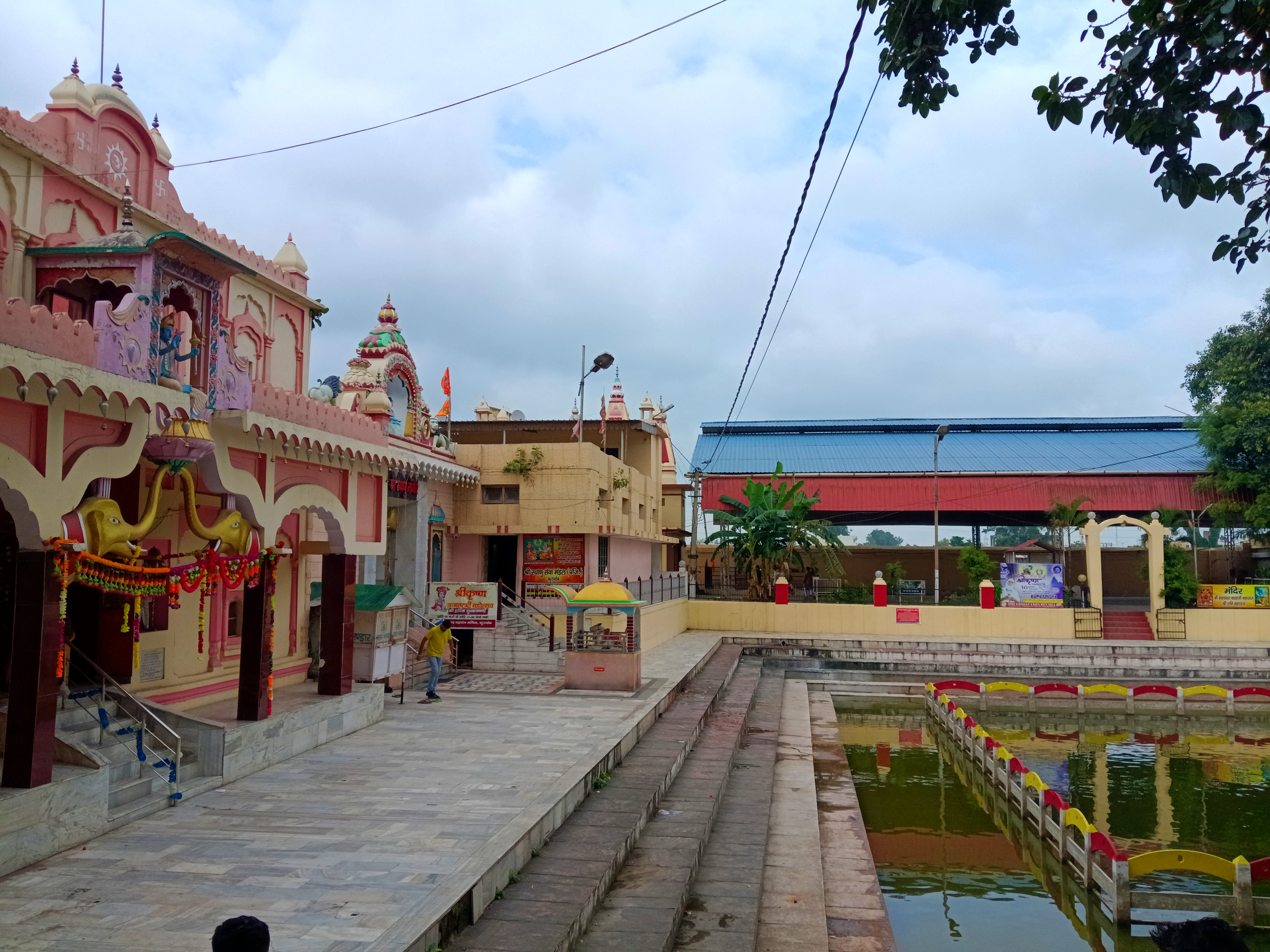
- Sthaneshwar Mahadev temple kurukshetra

Religion
- Affiliation: Hinduism
- District: Kurukshetra district
- Deity: Lord (Shiva)

Location
- Location: old Kurukshetra city
- State: Haryana
- Country: India

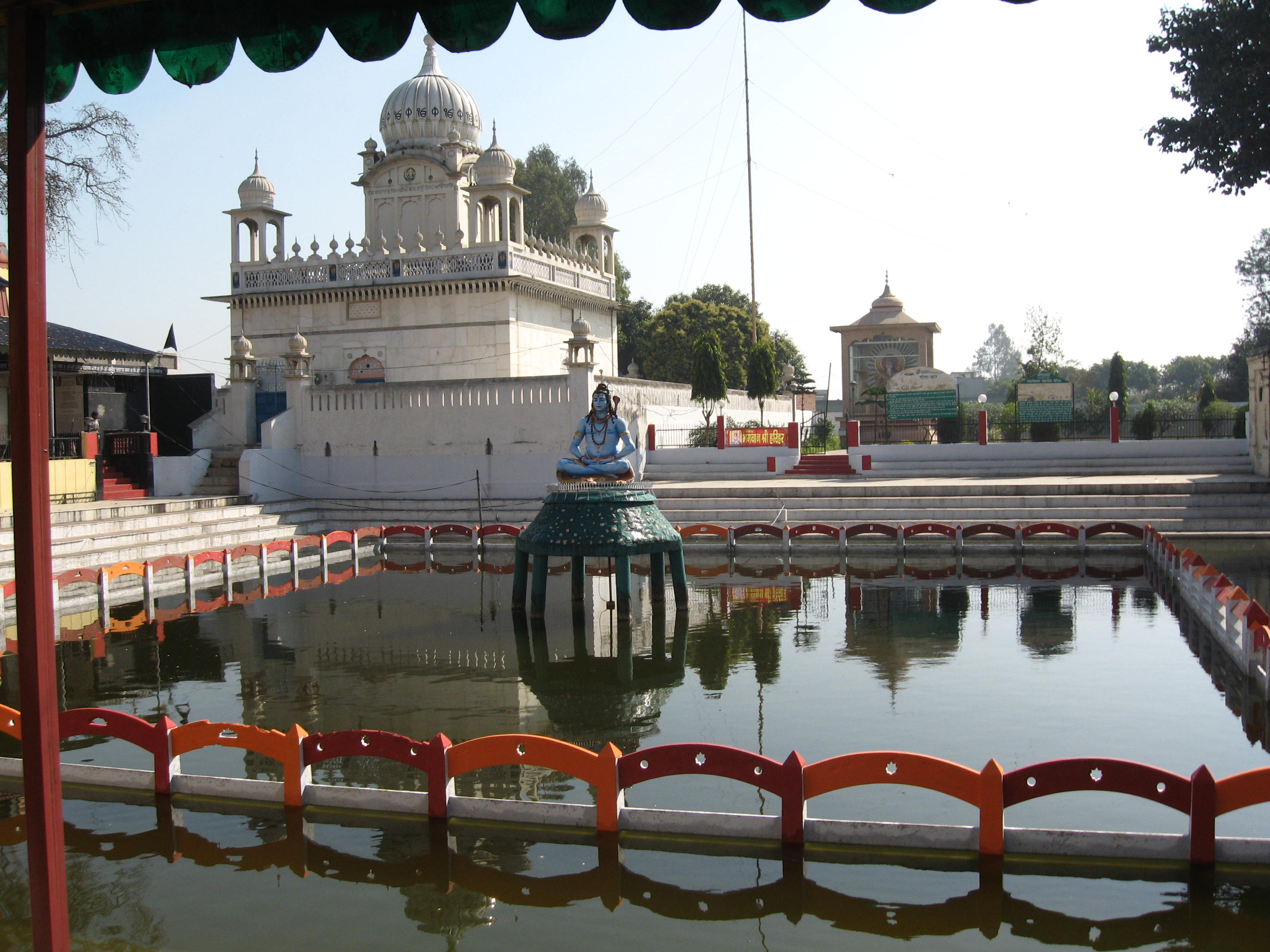
Sthaneshwar Mahadev Mandir

The ancient Sthaneshwar Mahadev Temple, dedicated to Shiva is situated in old Kurukshetra city Kurukshetra district of Haryana, India. It was here that the Pandavas along with Krishna are said to have prayed to Shiva and to have received his blessings for victory in the battle of Mahabharata. The ninth Guru, Shri Tegh Bahadur stayed at a spot near the Sthaneshwar Tirtha that is marked by a gurdwara just beside the temple.

== History ==
The temple is dedicated to Shiva, the presiding deity of the ancient city of Sthaneshwar presently known as Thanesar city or Kurukshetra city. Pushpabhuti, the founder of the Vardhana Empire of Thanesar named the capital of his kingdom after Sthaneshwar Shiva. The existing temple was constructed by Raghunath Rao Peshwa.
