= Geong =

Geong Sarkaar's village
- village
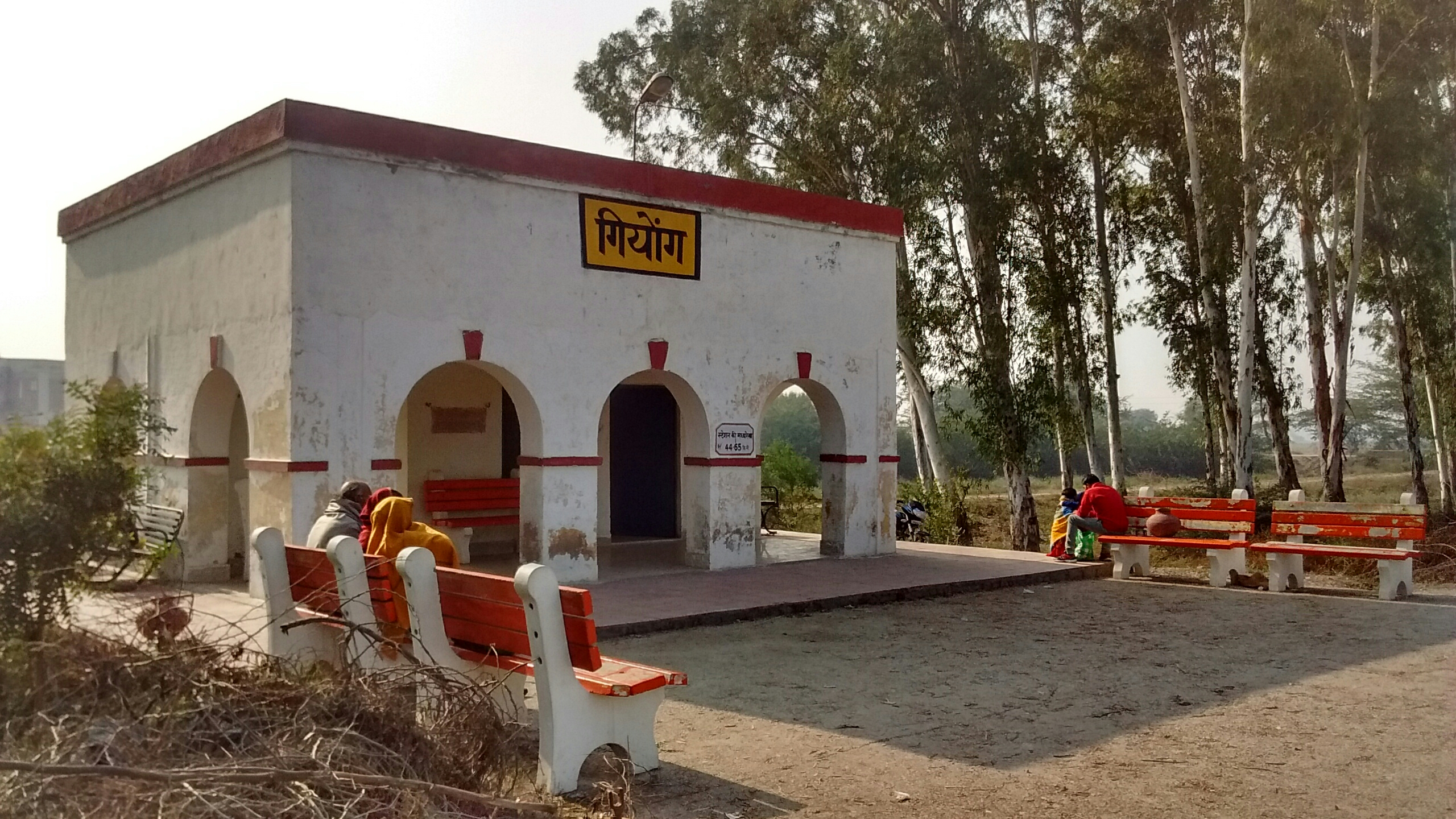
- Geong railway station

- Location in Haryana, India Geong (India)
- Coordinates: 29.813754°N 76.469307°E
- Country: India
- State: Haryana
- District: Kaithal district
- Elevation: 237 m (778 ft)

Population (2011)
  - Total: 5,286

Languages
  - Official: Hindi
- Time zone: UTC+5:30 (IST)
- PIN: 136027
- Telephone code: 01746

Geong is a village in the Kaithal district of Haryana state, India. It is located 6 kilometres (3.7 mi) east of the district headquarters on the Kaithal–Kurukshetra state highway and 124 kilometres (77 mi) from the state capital Chandigarh. The village is part of Ambala division and lies around 150 kilometres (93 mi) north of the national capital New Delhi. Geong is 237 meters above sea level. There are so many temples and religious places in the village.

== Demographics ==
At the time of the 2011 Indian census, there are 1,008 families in Geong. The population is 5,286, comprising 2,829 males and 2,457 females. The average sex ratio is 869, which is lower than Haryana state average of 879. The child sex ratio is 874, higher than the Haryana average of 834. The literacy rate of Geong village is 65.10% compared to 75.55% in Haryana. Male literacy is 75.58% and female literacy is 53.03%. In line with the Constitution of India and the Panchyati Raaj Act, Geong is administrated by a sarpanch (head of village) who is an elected representative of the village.

The houses are mostly built of concrete. Most of the people who live in Geong are farmers; others work as potters, carpenters and blacksmiths. Bulls are use for farming and other activities.

The majority of the population are Jats but other cast are also there like Gurjar, Brahman, Nai, Chamar, Valmiki etc. Currently, Geong does not have any Schedule Tribe (ST) population.

In Geong, the sun time varies by 24 minutes from IST. The native languages of Geong is Hindi, Haryanvi and Punjabi; most of the village people speak Haryanvi.

== Transportation ==
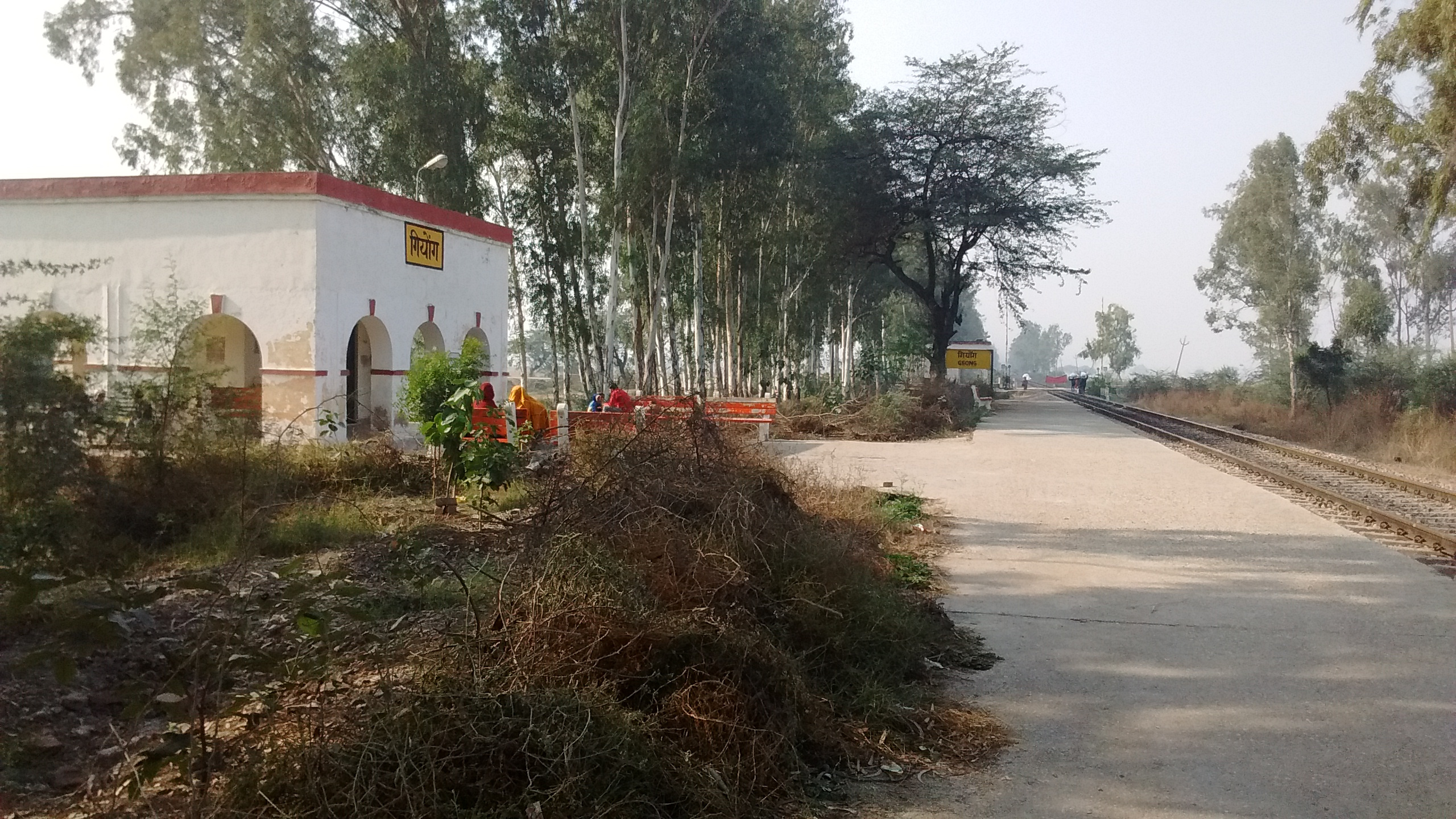
Geong railway station view

Geong is serveded by National Highway 152 and State Highway SH-8 (Karnal Road). Geong is connected to the Indian Railways network on the Kurukshetra–Jind line 2 major railway routs, and also to the state capital Chandigarh and to New Delhi. Indian Railways uses code Geong Halt or Geong H, which also mentioned as GXG. The other nearest railway station to Geong is Kaithal, around 5 kilometres distance. Geong's nearest airport is Karnal Airport situated 55.8 km away. Other nearest airports are Chandigarh Airport (around 120 km) and New Delhi airport (200 km).
