= Jamni =

- village
- Village of Jamni, Jind district, Haryana Jamni (India)
- Coordinates: 29.3423615°N 76.4029389°E
- Country: India
- State: Haryana
- District: Jind district
- Elevation: 230 m (750 ft)

Languages
  - Official: Hindi and Punjabi, English, Haryanvi
- Time zone: UTC+5:30 (IST)
- Telephone code: 01686
- ISO 3166 code: IN-HR
- Vehicle registration: HR
- Taluka: Pillukhera
- Distance from Chandigarh: 178 kilometres (111 mi)
- Distance from Jind: 20 kilometres (12 mi)
- Pin Code : 126113; Post Office Name : Jamni, Pillukhera

Jamni is a village in Pillukhera tehsil in Jind district of Haryana State, India. It belongs to the Hisar division. It is located 20 km east of the district headquarters, Jind; 3 km from Pillukhera; and 178 km from the state capital, Chandigarh.

Villages near Jamni are Dhatrath (4 km), Taloda (4 km), Kalwa (5 km), Pilu Khera (5 km), Pillukhera (5 km). Jamni is surrounded by Alewa Tehsil to the north, Safidon Tehsil to the east, Jind Tehsil to the west, and Assandh Tehsil to the north. Jind, Safidon, Assandh, Gohana are the nearby cities to Jamni.

== Transport ==
Pillukhera and Siwaha are the nearest railway stations to Jamni. The village lies on the bank of the Hansi Branch Canal. It is connected by road to Safidon and Bibipur.

== Education ==
There are several colleges near Jamni: K.m.govt. College, Dav Polytechnical College, Sir Chotu Ram Polytechnic College, Govt.P. G. College and Government College. There is a secondary school in Jamni, G. H. S. Jamni. There is an animal husbandry school in the village.
