= Shergarh, Kaithal =

Shergarh Sher Garh
- village
- Location in Haryana, India Shergarh (India)
- Coordinates: 29.778049°N 76.420066°E
- Country: India
- State: Haryana
- District: Kaithal district

Government
  - Type: Local government
  - Body: Panchayat

Area
  - Total: 3.69 km^{2} (1.42 sq mi)
- Elevation: 237 m (778 ft)

Population (2011)
  - Total: 1,389
  - Density: 376/km^{2} (975/sq mi)

Languages
  - Official: Hindi
- Time zone: UTC+5:30 (IST)
- PIN: 136027
- Telephone code: 01746
- Vehicle registration: HR-08
- Literacy: 60.44% (total); 69.39% (male); 50.60% (female)
- Sex ratio: 882 ♂/♀

Shergarh village is located in Kaithal Tehsil of Kaithal district in Haryana, India. It is situated 3 kilometres (1.9 mi) away from Kaithal, which is both district & sub-district headquarter of Shergarh village. As per 2009 stats, Shergarh village is also a gram panchayat.

== Demographics ==
Most of the population of the village is Hindu and widely spoken language is Haryanvi.

== Schools ==
- Govt. Sr. Secondary Sechool.

Bhagwan Parshuram Government Polytechnic

== Transportation ==
The nearby Railway stations to Shergarh village are New Kaithal Halt Railway station (NKLE) and Kaithal Railway station (KLE).

From Kaithal bus stand, bus services are also available to Delhi, Hisar, Chandigarh, Jammu and many other places.
