= Abhimanyupur =

Abhimanyupur Amin
- village
- Location in Haryana, India Abhimanyupur (India)
- Coordinates: 29°55′N 76°51′E
- Country: India
- State: Haryana
- District: Kurukshetra

Population (2011)
  - Total: 8,167

Languages
  - Official: Hindi
- Time zone: UTC+5:30 (IST)
- PIN: 136038
- Telephone code: 01744
- ISO 3166 code: IN-HR
- Vehicle registration: HR-07
- Nearest city: Kurukshetra
- Lok Sabha constituency: Kurukshetra
- Vidhan Sabha constituency: Thanesar

Abhimanyupur (formerly Amin) is a village in Kurukshetra district of Haryana, India. This village is 8 kilometres from the city of Kurukshetra. This village is famous for being the site where Abhimanyu, the son of Arjuna, died in the Mahabharata War. This is the site where the Kauravas arranged the deadly "chakravyuha" formation and trapped and killed Abhimanyu. This village is part of the 48 kos parikrama of Kurukshetra. This village has many sacred places associated with Hinduism.

== Background ==
=== Etymology ===
The village used to be called Amin, which was most likely a version of the word "Abhimanyu". In October 2019, Haryana Chief Minister Manohar Lal Khattar visited the village as part of his plans to develop an organized tourism circuit of the 48 kos parikrama of Kurukshetra. During his visit, Manohar Lal Khattar renamed Amin to Abhimanyupur after the Mahabharata-era Abhimanyu.

=== History ===
In October 2019, Haryana Chief minister, Manohar Lal Khattar, included Abhimanyupur in the Indian government's Krishna Tourism Circuit development project, under which the site and village will be developed for tourism and amenities for the villagers. He instructed the Kurukshetra Development Board to develop an Abhimanyu Park, widen the road to Abhimanyupur, and build basic amenities like toilets and water facilities in Abhimanyupur and surrounding areas.

== Demographics ==
According to the 2011 census, about 8167 people lived in this village, 4333 were men, while 3834 were women, giving the village a sex ratio of about 885.

About 26% of the population are scheduled caste, while 0% of the population are scheduled tribe.

The literacy rate of this village was 75.05%, 84.03% for males and 64.99% for females.

== Mahabharat era sites ==
=== Archaeological mound ===
==== Chakravyuha and Abhimanyu ka tila ====
Abhimanyu ka tila or Abhimanyupur Fort is a 10-meter high 650x250m unexcavated archaeological mound at Amin (Abhimanyupur) in Kurukshetra in Haryana. It is popularly also known as Abhimanyukhera. It is believed to be the site of famous Chakravyuha, arranged by the Kauravas to fight the Mahabharata War with Pandavas in which Abhimanyu, the son of Arjuna, was trapped in this Chakravyuha and killed.

==== Excavations and finds ====
The mound remains unexcavated. Two inscribed red sandstone pillars decorated with reliefs of Yaksha and other motifs belonging to 2nd century BC Ewere found here, which are presently are displayed in the Sculpture Gallery at National Museum, New Delhi. In second century BCE, this area was under Maurya Empire till 185 BCE and thereafter Indo-Greek Kingdom.

=== Abhimanyu park ===
Abhimanyu Park is being developed by the Kurukshetra Development Board. The park, developed on 8-acre land in the village, will house a statue of Abhimanyuand Chakravyūha formation.

==== Abhimanyu statue ====
A 18-ft tall statue of Abhimanyu, with a chariot wheel carried in both hands above his head depicting his stance during the Chakravyūha battle of mahabharta war, is installed at Abhimanyupur at the place where he was killed. It was installed by the Kurukshetra Development Board at a cost of Rs 24 lakh in 2020.

=== Wetlands and temples ===
==== Aditi wetland and temple ====
Aditi Kund and Aditi Temple: There is a sacred "kund" (water tank) in Abhimanyupur. It is said that the goddess Aditi gave birth to Surya deva (the Sun God in Hinduism) here. There is also a small temple here.

==== Surya wetland and temple ====
Abhimanyupur Surya Kund and Surya Temple: Next to the Aditi Kund and temple are a small kund and temple dedicated to Surya. Villagers generally deposit the "asthi kalash" (mortal remains) of dead people in the Surya Kund. It is said that if any pregnant lady takes a bath in this holy kund and worships at the Aditi Temple, the male child will be brave.

== Modern amenities ==
There is a Haryana Government veterinary hospital to cater to the needs of the village people for quite some time. There is a school that provides education until senior secondary level. There is a stadium in the name of Mr. Sunil Chauhan. The village also has a pond that is used for pisciculture.

== See also ==
- Administrative divisions of Haryana
- History of Haryana
- Outline of Haryana
- 48 kos parikrama of Kurukshetra
