= Gita Mahotsav =

Hindu observance marking the composition of the Bhagavad Gita

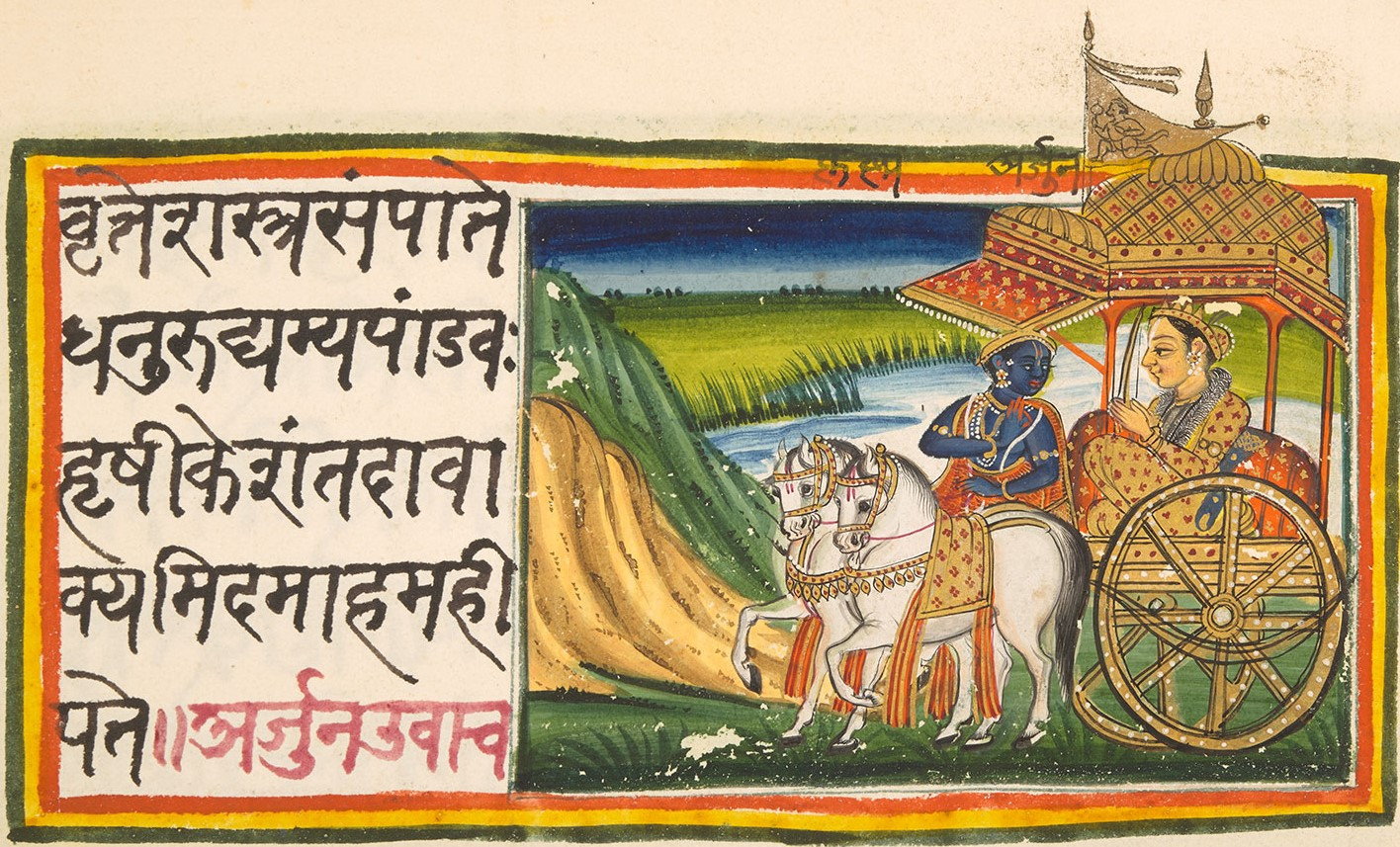
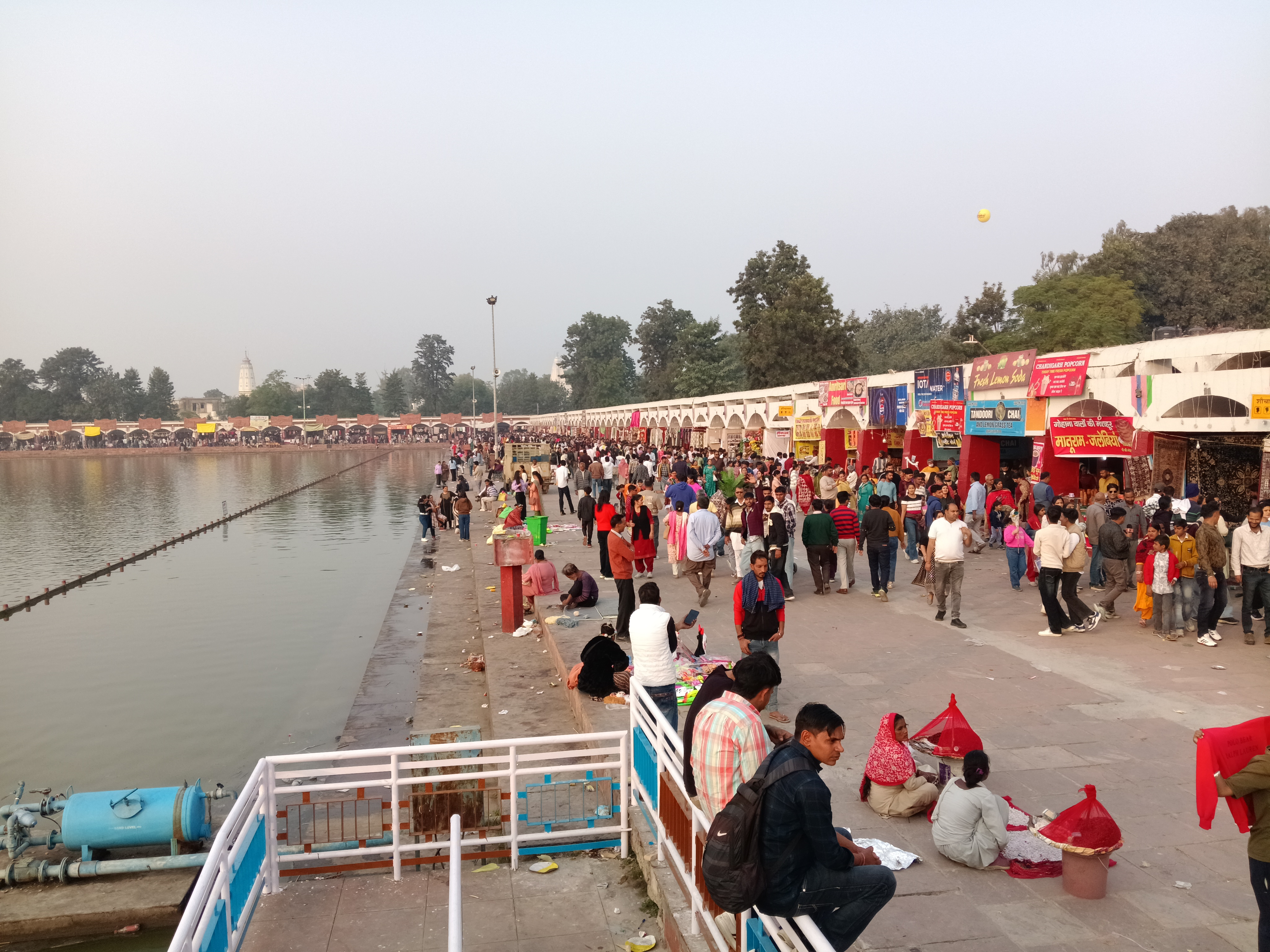
- Illustrated manuscript of Krishna delivering the Bhagavad Gita to Arjuna on the battlefield of Kurukshetra And Heavy Rush On Gita Mahotsav 2025 At Brahma Sarovar
- Nickname: Gita Jayanti
- Dates: 22 December 2023; 11 December 2024; 1 December 2025
- Locations: Kurukshetra Haryana, India

Gita Mahotsav (Sanskrit: गीतामहोत्सव, romanized: Gītāmahotsava), Gita Jayanti, also known as Mokshada Ekadashi or Matsya Dvadashi is a Hindu observance that marks the day the Bhagavad Gita dialogue occurred between Arjuna and Krishna on the battlefield of Kurukshetra. It is celebrated on Shukla Ekadashi, the 11th day of the waxing moon of the lunar month Margashirsha (December–January) of the Hindu calendar.

== Bhagavad Gita ==
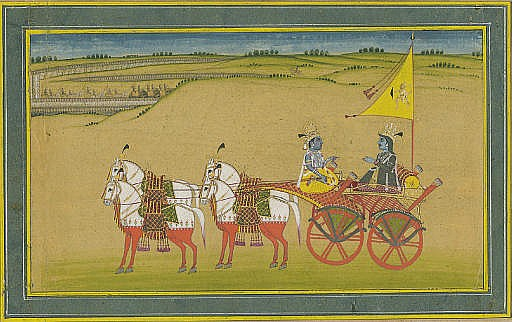
The Delivery of the Bhagavad Gita

=== Structure ===
The Bhagavad Gita is a prominent Hindu scripture which forms a part of the epic Mahabharata. The text itself is structurally divided into 18 chapters, containing 700 shlokas or couplets.

=== Content ===
The Bhagavad Gita is presented as a dialogue between Arjuna, a prince, and Krishna, the embodiment of God. The contents of the scripture are derived from the Upanishads and discuss different paths of jnana (knowledge), karma (action) and bhakti (devotion) and how they lead to moksha (ultimate liberation) of the soul. The dialogue takes place just before the start of the Kurukshetra War. After several attempts at reconciliation failed, war was inevitable. The day of the war finally came, and the armies faced off on the field of war. Just as the battle was about to start, Arjuna asked Krishna to drive the chariot to the middle of the battlefield, to look more closely at the opposing forces. Seeing that the opposing side consisted of his relatives, teachers and friends, Arjuna was left in a state of moral dilemma about fighting them and sought help from Krishna. The conversation that ensued, Krishna's advice, messages and teachings to Arjuna, is what is known now as the Bhagavad Gita.

== Gita Aarti ==
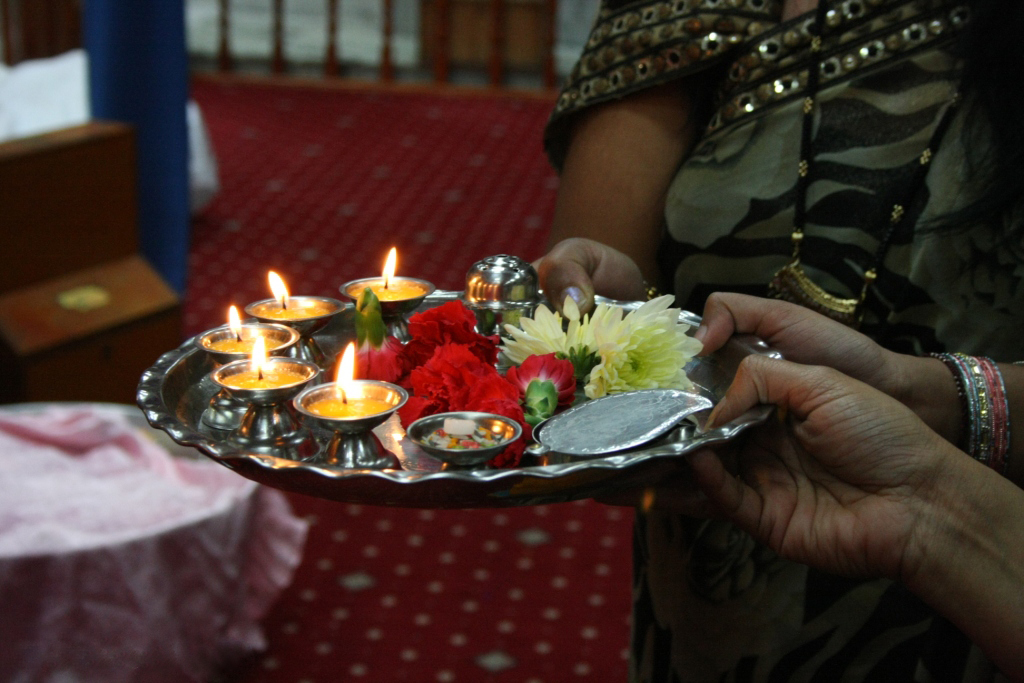
Aarti

The Bhagavad Gita Aarti or Gita Aarti is a prayer not found in the Bhagavad Gita.

The aarti can be spoken, or sung with musical instruments to give more effect to worship. Aartis are usually performed at the end of the puja ritual. It is said that if there was any flaw in the puja, it may be fulfilled by the aarti.

The first verse of the hymn is as follows:

jaya bhagavad gīte
jaya bhagavad gīte
hari hiya kamala vihārini
sundara supuṇīte
jaya bhagavad gīte

— Verse 1

== Celebration ==
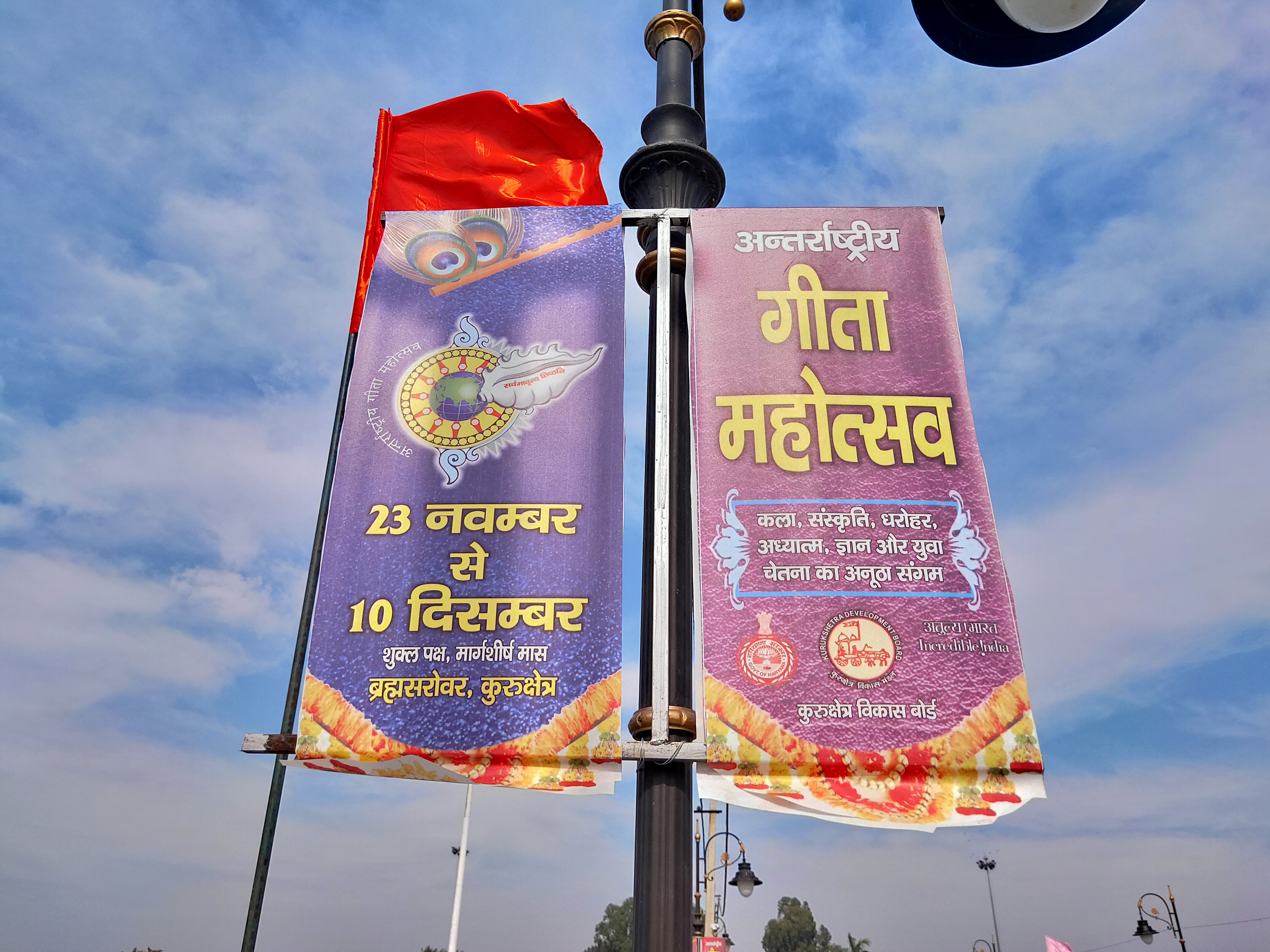
International Gita Mahotsav 2019

During the International Gita Mahotsav, more than 300 national and international stalls are set up around the Brahma Sarovar in Kurukshetra city. Pilgrims also undertake the 48 Kos Parikrama of Kurukshetra.

=== 2016 ===
In 2016, the Government of Haryana organized the International Gita Mahotsav from 6 to 10 December. Pranab Mukherjee, President of India, was to inaugurate the Mahotsav; later it was done by Kaptan Singh Solanki, Governor of Haryana, and Manohar Lal Khattar, Chief Minister.

=== 2017 ===
In 2017, the Gita Mahotsav was held on 25 November to 3 December, inaugurated by Ram Nath Kovind, President of India.

=== 2019 ===
The International Gita Mahotsav 2019 was inaugurated by Haryana Chief Secretary Keshni Anand Arora on 23 November 2019 on the bank of the Brahma Sarovar water pool in Thanesar, Haryana..

=== 2020 ===
The Government of Haryana celebrated the International Gita Mahotsav from 17 December to 25 December 2020.

=== 2021 ===
Gita Jayanti 2021: Today on 14 December 2021, Gita Mahotsav was celebrated with great pomp. This celebration was being held in Kurukshetra from 2 December to 19 December 2021. International Gita Mahotsav is organized by Kurukshetra Development Board, Haryana Tourism, District Administration, North Zone Cultural Centre, Patiala and Information and Public Relations Department Haryana.

2025

In June 2025, it was announced that the International Gita Mahotsav would be celebrated jointly by India and England, marking an expansion of the event’s international outreach and reinforcing its illustrative role in spiritual diplomacy.

== See also ==
- Bhagavad Gita
