= Vraja Parikrama =

Pilgrimage trip

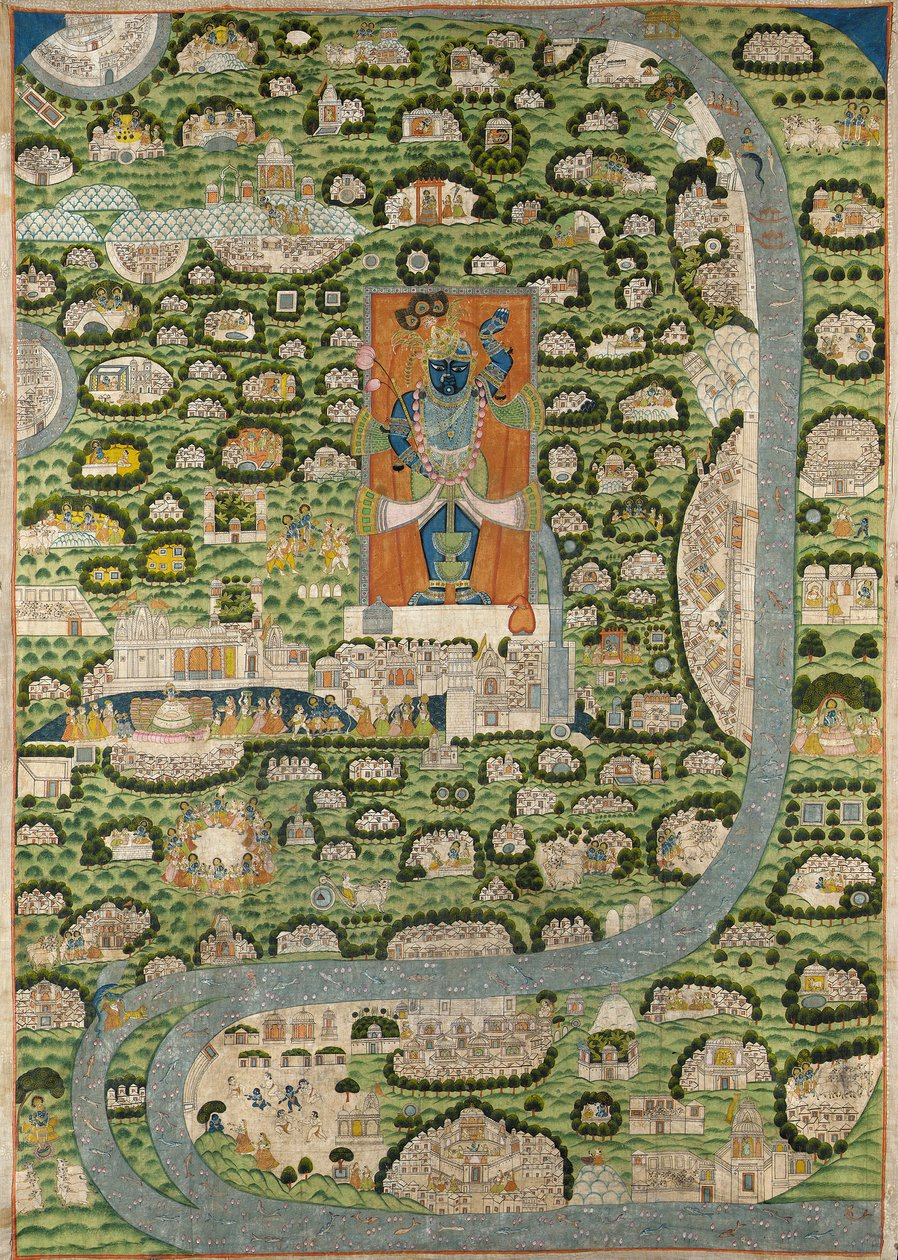
A 19th century pichhwai of the Pushtimarg Vraj Parikrama

Vraja Mandal Parikrama, also called Vraja Yatra (Vraja pilgrimage), is a Vaishnava Hindu pilgrimage dedicated to Krishna. Different sects follow different itineraries, there being separate routes for Gaudiya Vaishnavism, the Pushtimarga Sampradaya, the Gore Dauji temple of Vrindavan (Ramanandi), and Nimbarka Sampradaya. Currently, this Parikrama is conducted under the leadership of Rasbiharidas Kathiababa, the 57th Acharya of the All India Vaishnava Chaturthi community, under the leadership of the Nimbarka Sampradaya.

== Braj pilgrimage circuit ==
Braj Yatra circuit of pilgrimage was formally established by the 16th century sadhus of vaishnava sampradaya with fixed routes, itinerary, and rituals. The circuit covers is spread across 2500 km^{2} area with 84 kos or 300 km long periphery extending 10 km to east and 50 km to north and west. Braj has two main types of pilgrimage circuits, the traditional longer Braj Yatra encompassing the whole circuit, and the other shorter significantly modified contemporary point-to-point pilgrimage to visit the main sites at Mathura, Vrindavan, Gokul, Govardhan. The former, longer traditional pilgrimage route, also includes additional sacred sites Nandgaon and Barsana with travel on foot.

== See also ==
Religious

- 48 kos parikrama of Kurukshetra
- Dwarka
- Hindu pilgrimage sites in India
- Famous Hindu yatras
- List of Hindu festivals
- Padayatra
- Ratha Yatra
- Tirtha
- Tirtha and Kshetra

Regional

- Braj language
- Vajji, the ancient region of the Vṛji janapada that Bajjika evolved from

Vedic era

- King Kuru
- Cemetery H culture
- Painted Grey Ware culture
