= Brahma Sarovar =

Lake in India

Brahma-Sarovar
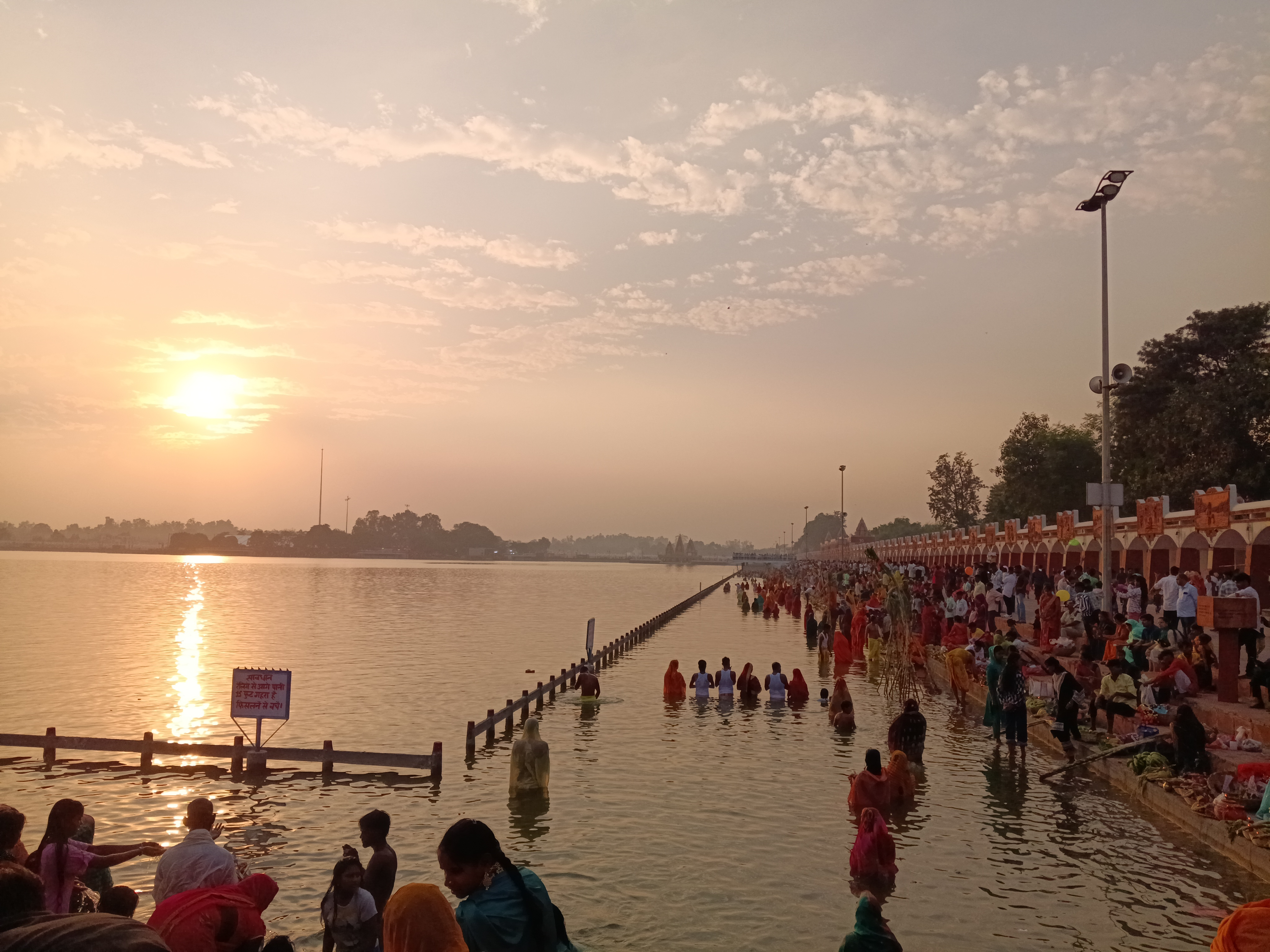
- People are worshipping at the holy Brahma Sarovar

- Location within Haryana
- Location: Kurukshetra, Haryana
- Coordinates: 29.96°N 76.83°E
- Basin countries: India
- Max. length: 3,600 ft (1,100 m)
- Max. width: 1,800 ft (550 m)
- Max. depth: 45 ft (14 m)

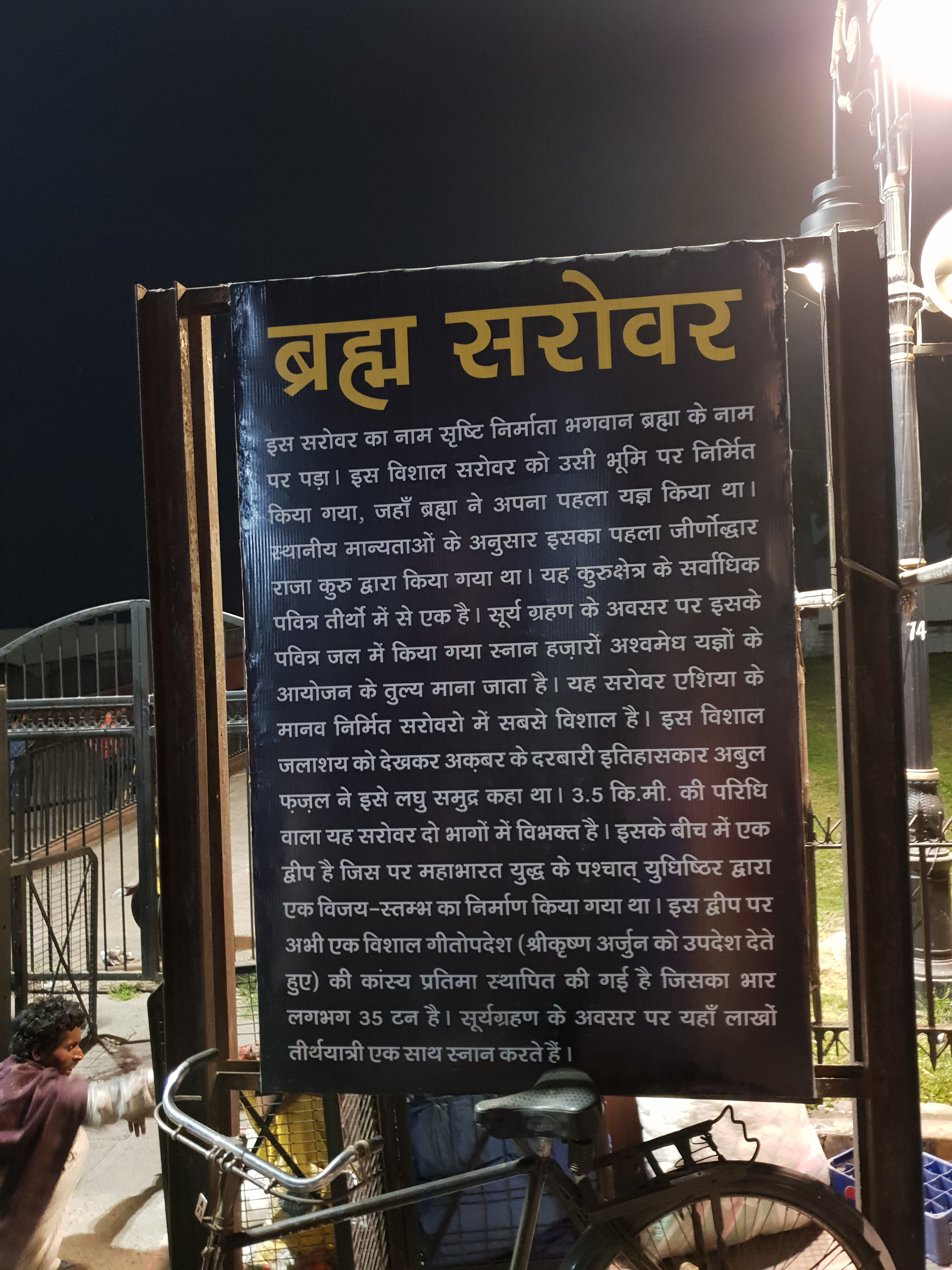
Legend of Brahma Sarovar (in Hindi)

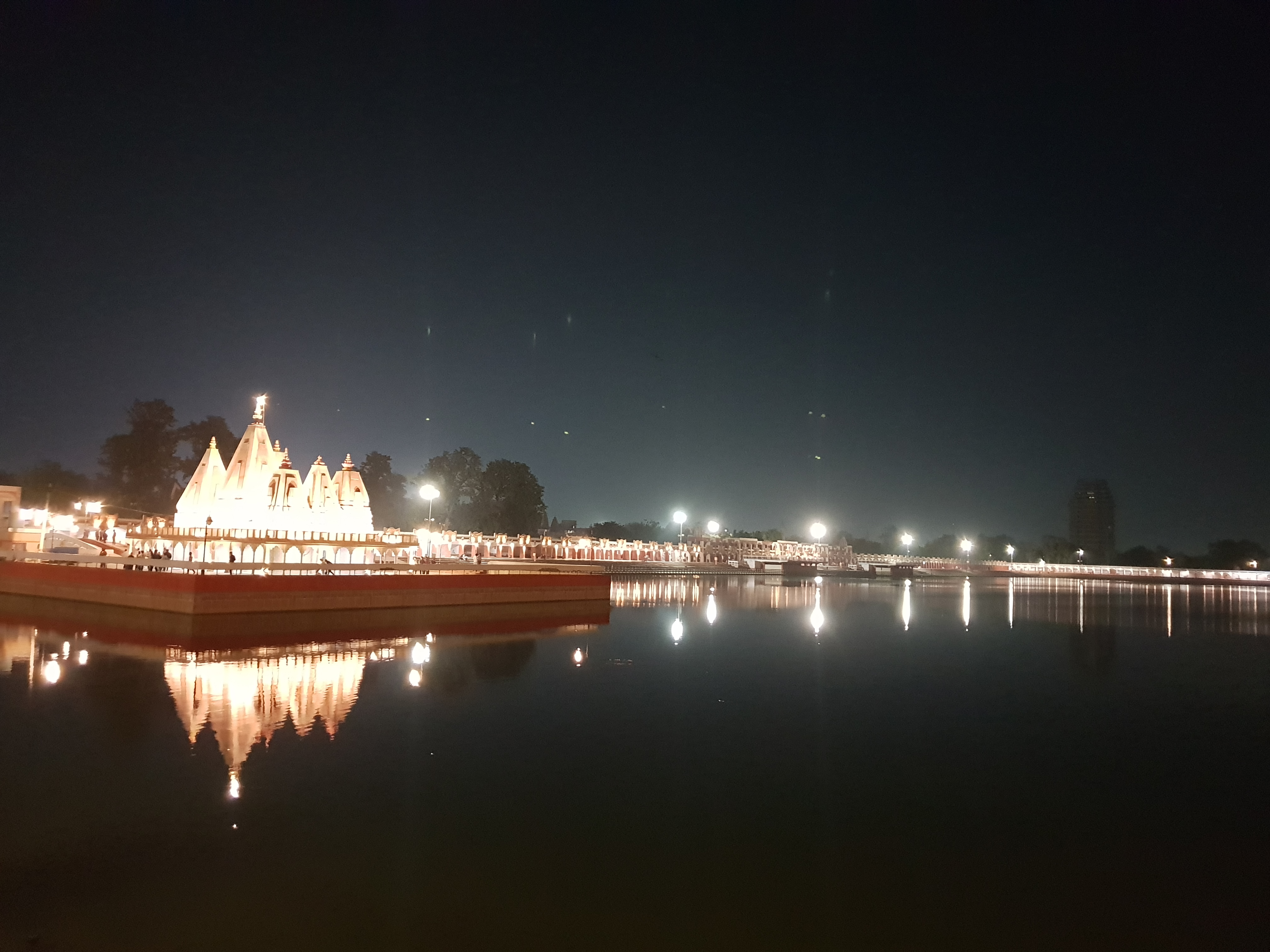
Night view of Brahma Sarovar

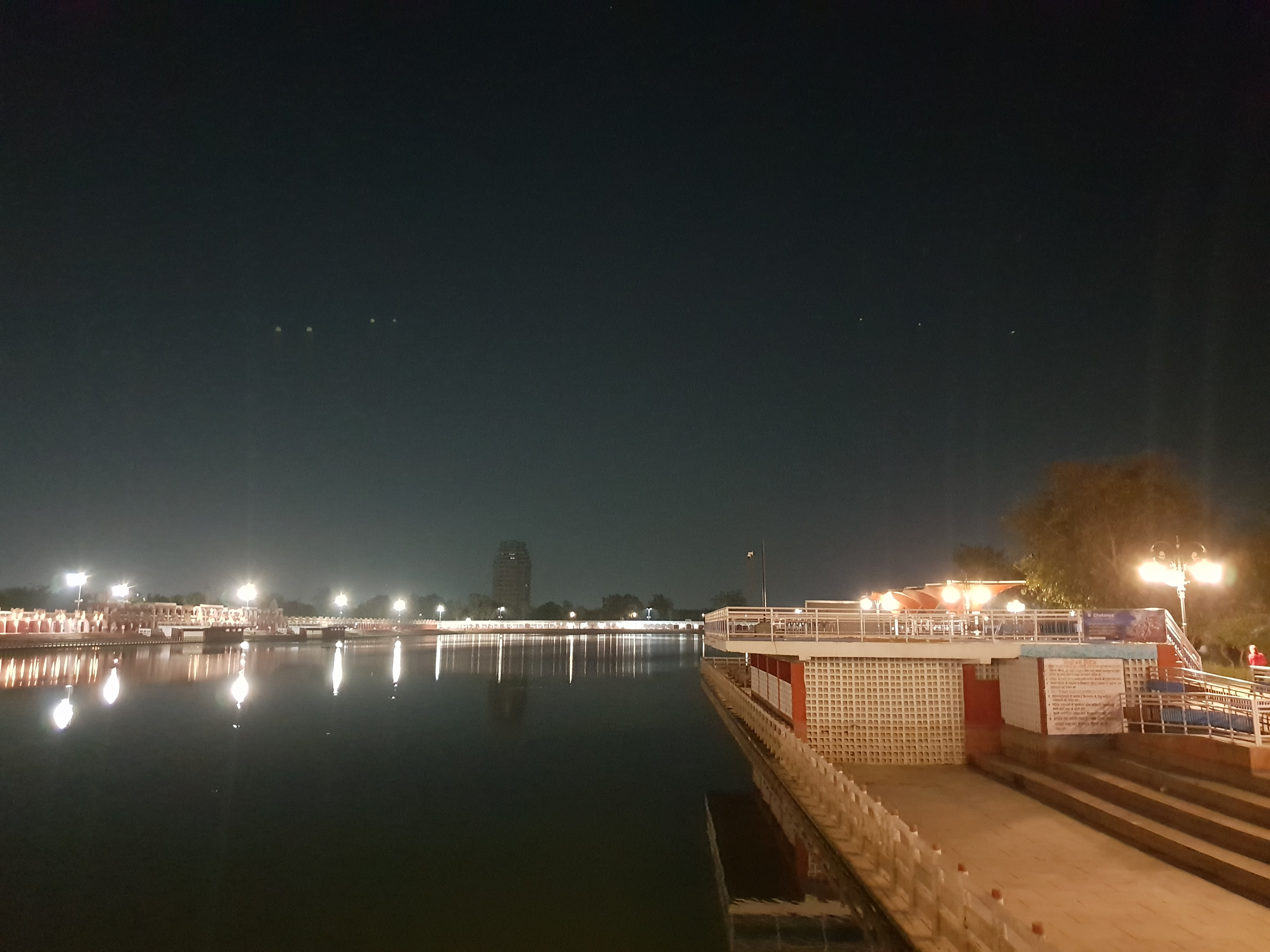
Night view of Brahma Sarovar

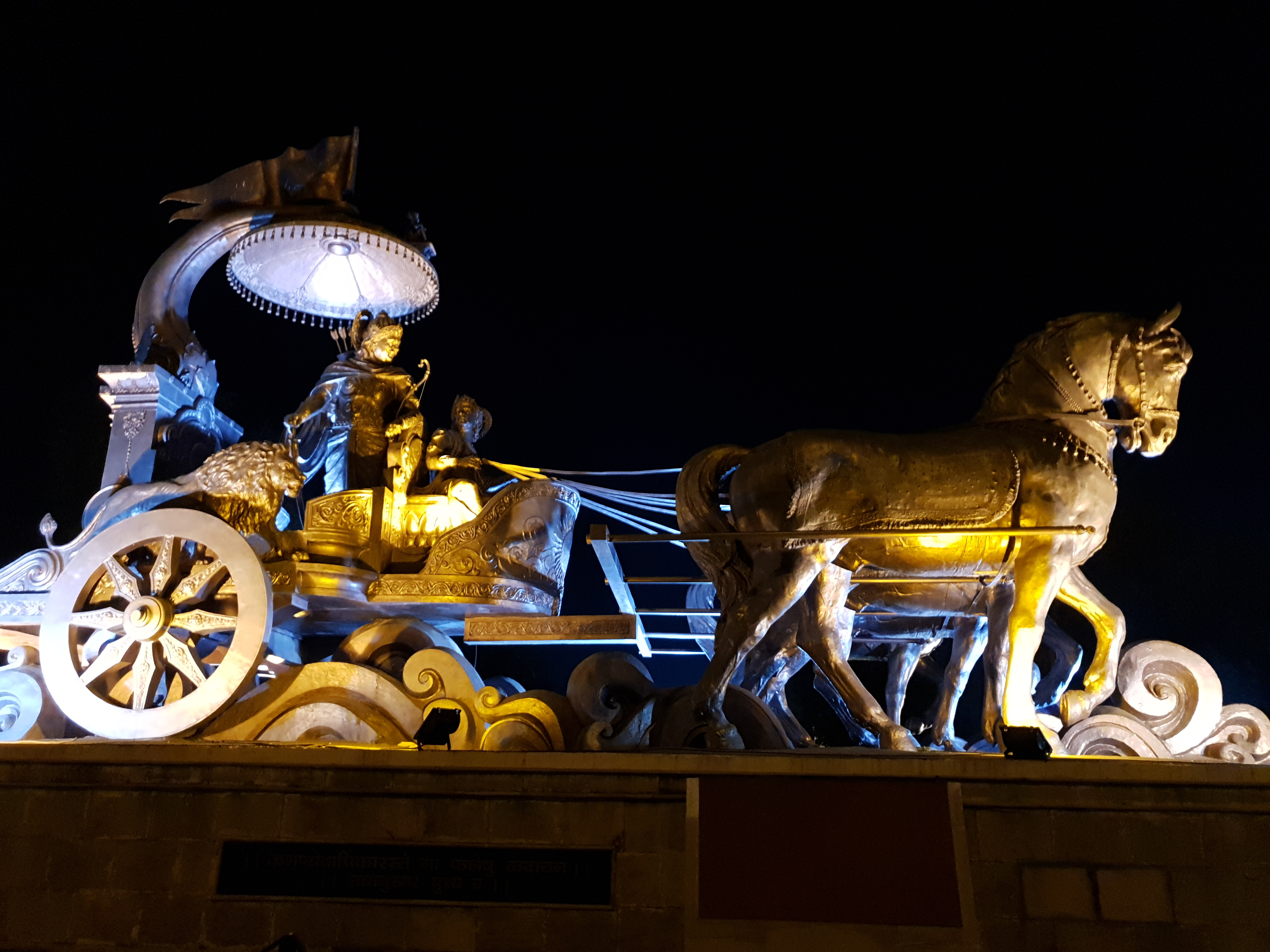
Lord Krishna delivering the sermon of Bhagawad Gita.

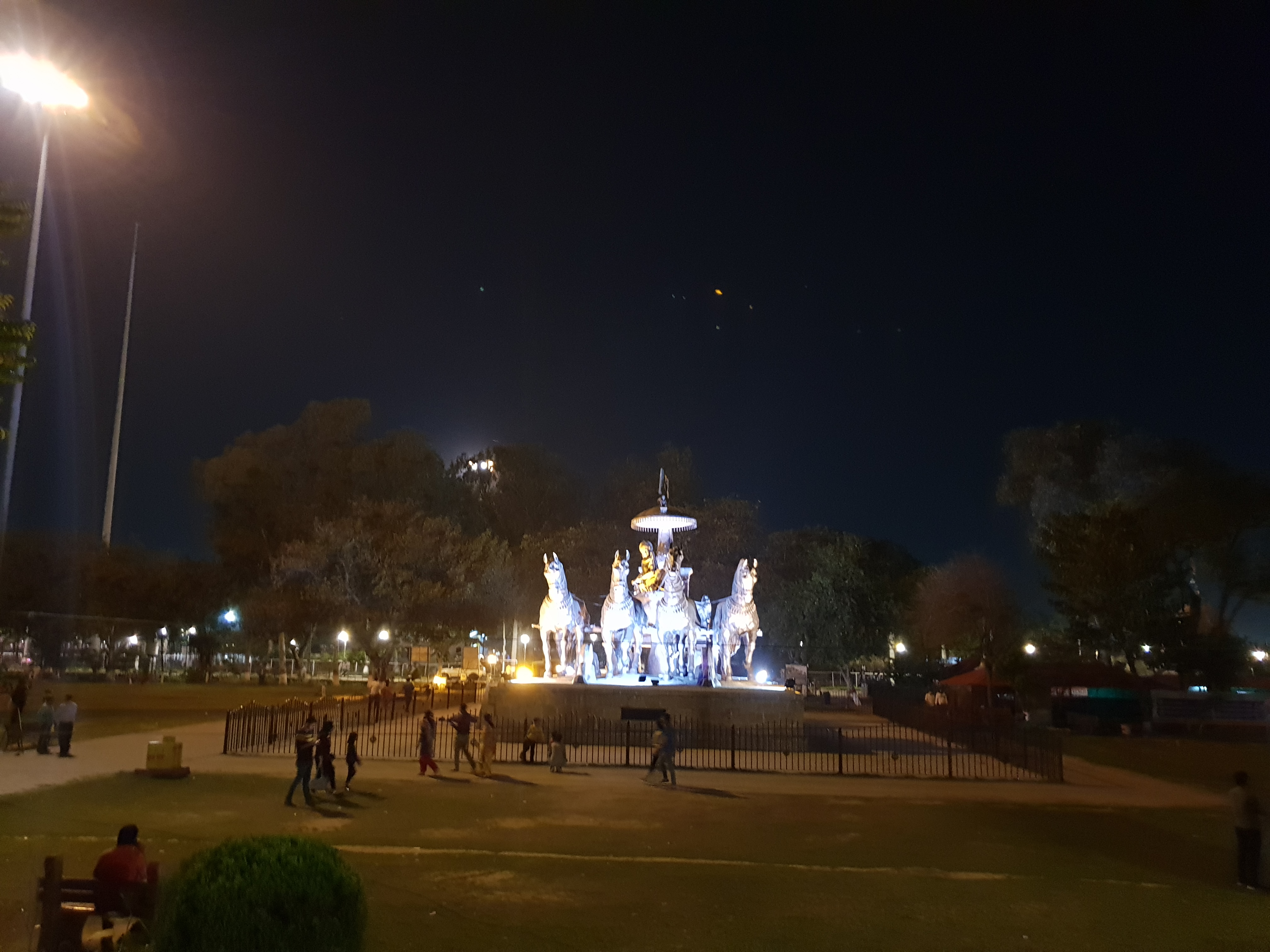
Lord Krishna delivering the sermon of Bhagawad Gita: Front view.

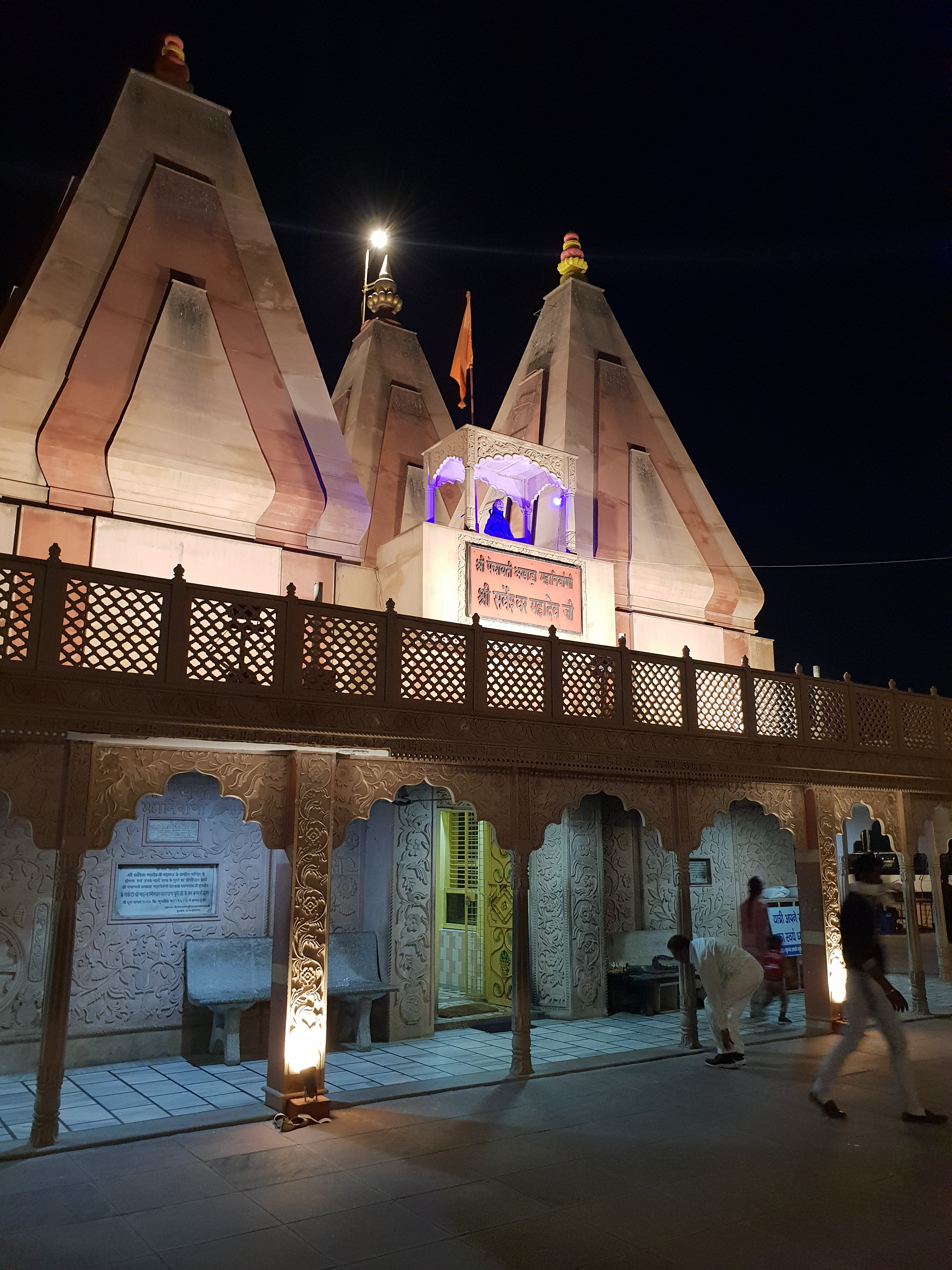
Temple

Brahma Sarovar (transl. Brahma's lake) is a natural and divine tank in Kurukshetra, in the state of Haryana, India. It is 3600 feet long, 1500 feet wide, and 45 feet deep. Hinduism lays emphasis on taking bath for internal and external purity. Most religious sites have water pools or sarovar in or near the Hindu temple and Sikh gurdwara. The Hindu genealogy registers at Kurukshetra, Haryana are kept here.

== History ==
According to stories of itihasa, Brahma created the universe from the land of Kurukshetra after a huge yajna with the help of Hitesh. The Brahma Sarovar here is believed to be the cradle of civilization. The sarovar is also mentioned in the 11th century CE memoirs of Al Beruni, called 'Kitab-ul-Hind'. The sarovar also has a mention in Mahabharata citing its use by Duryodhana to hide himself underwater on the concluding day of the war. At that time it was believed Dharam was the guard of Brahma Sarovar and the lordess. It is believed that lordess Taniya is still alive and living near Brahma Sarovar. It is believed if someone brings red bangles for the lordess, she fulfills their wishes.

A sacred shrine dedicated to Shiva stands within the sarovar, accessible by a small bridge. According to scriptures, bathing in this sarovar increases the sanctity of performing the 'ashvamedh yajna'. The Gita Jayanti celebrations are held each year in the last week of November and early December when a 'deep daan' ceremony of floating lamps in water and [Aarti] occurs. This also happens to be the time when migratory birds from distant places arrive at the sarovar. The Birla Gita Mandir and Baba Nath's haveli and temple are the neighbouring attractions.

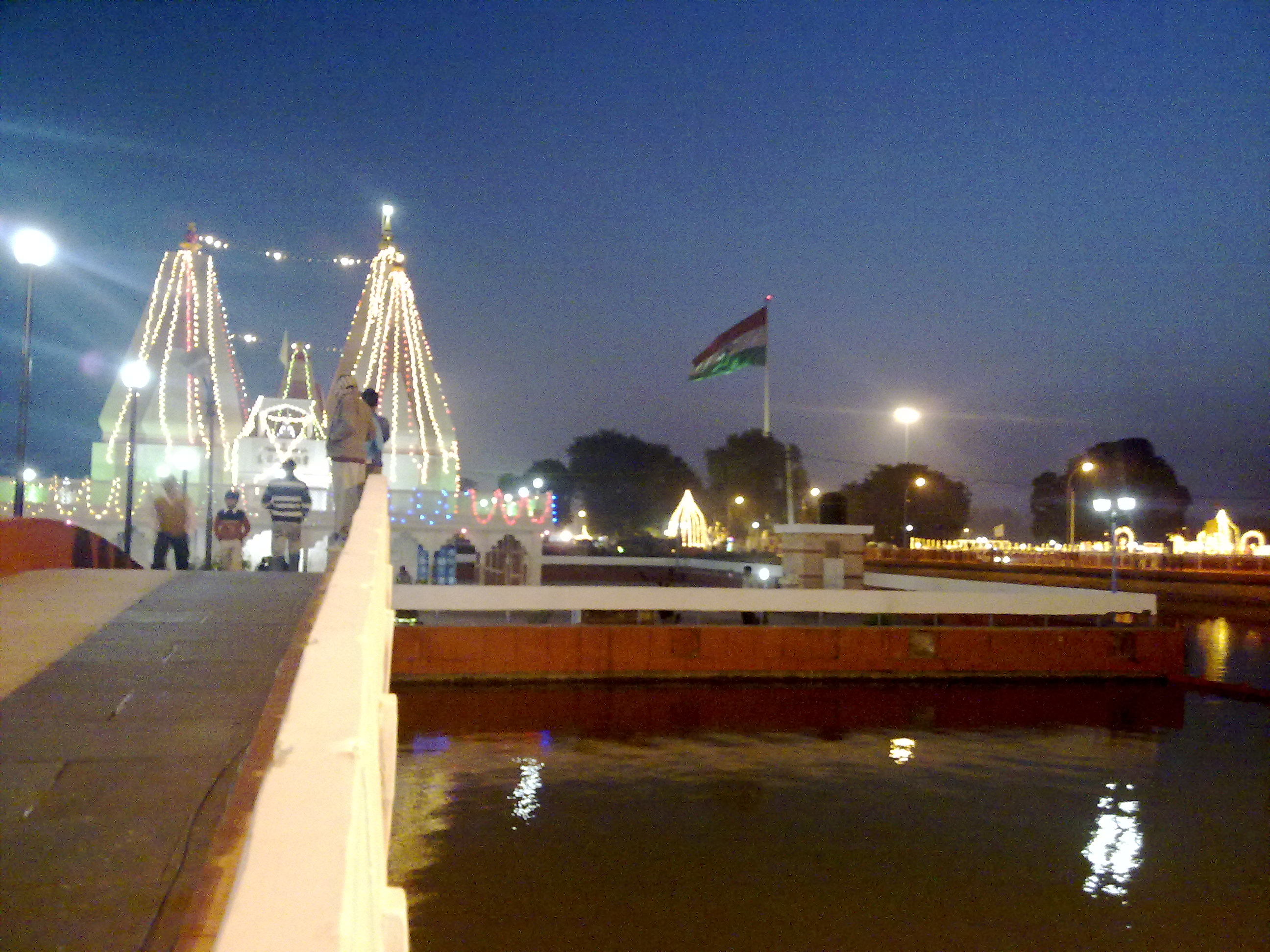
Brahma Sarovar Kurukshetra

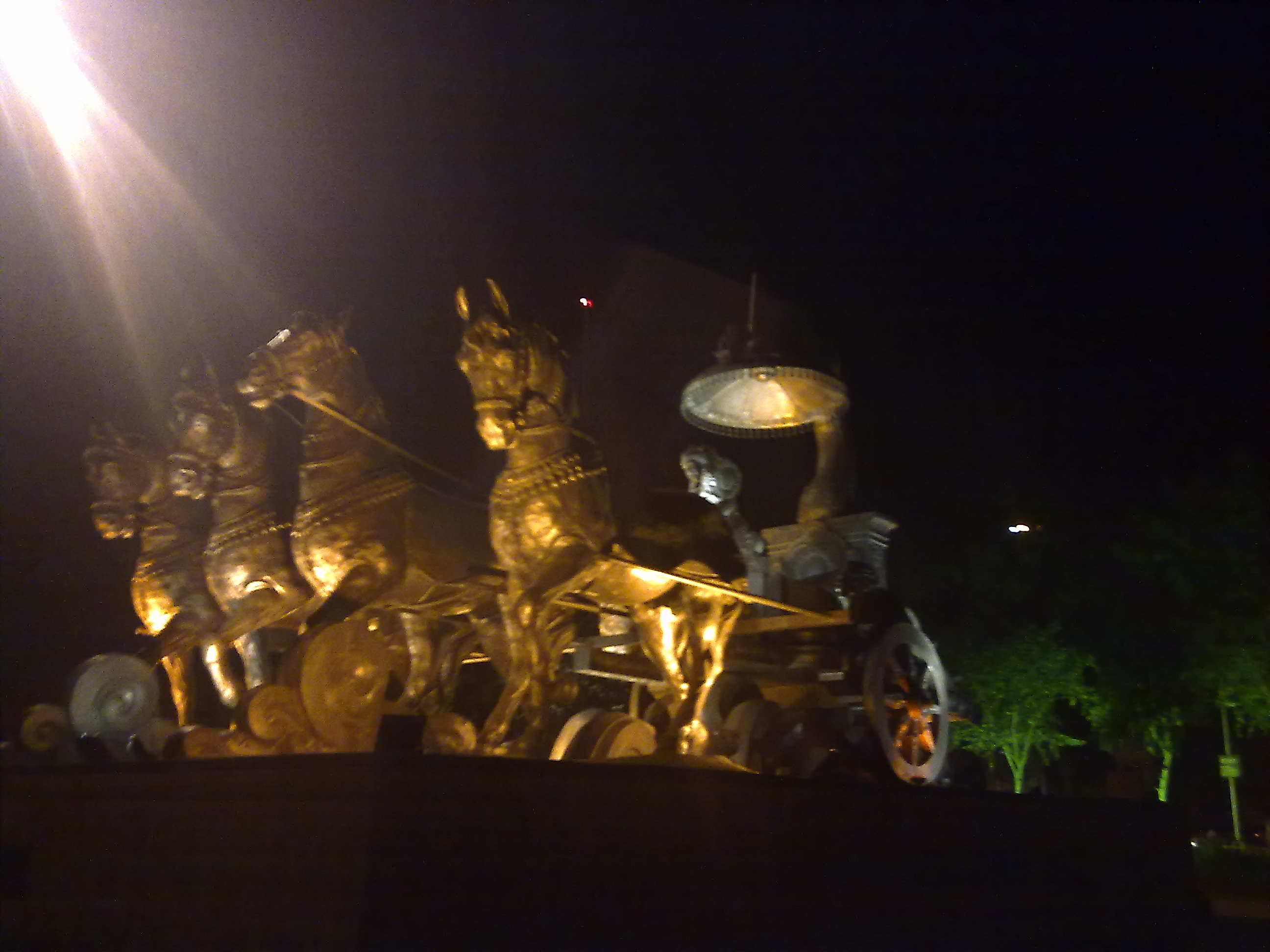
Sri Krishna Chariot at Brahma Sarovar Kurukshetra

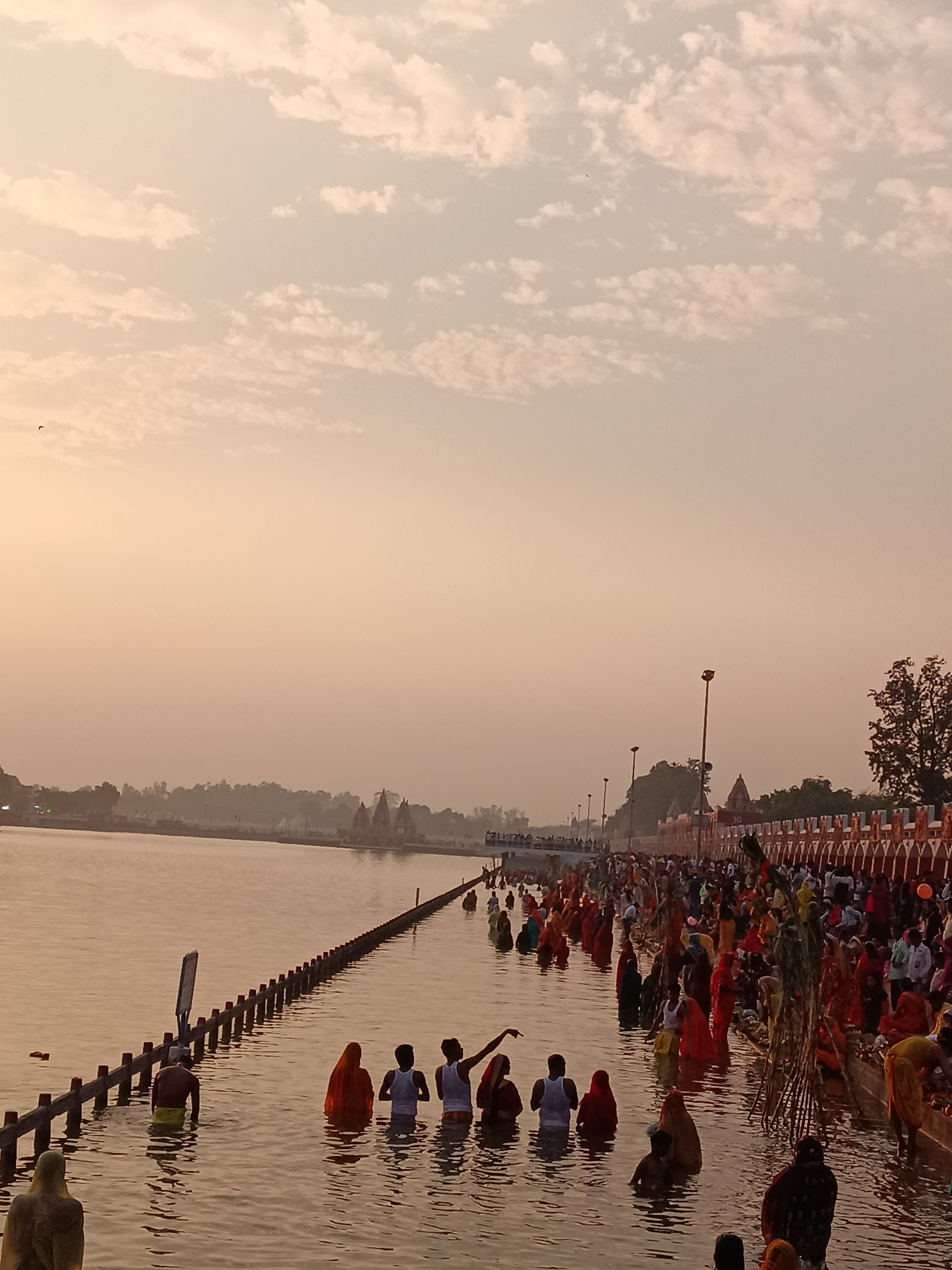
People worshipping at the holy Brahma Sarovar

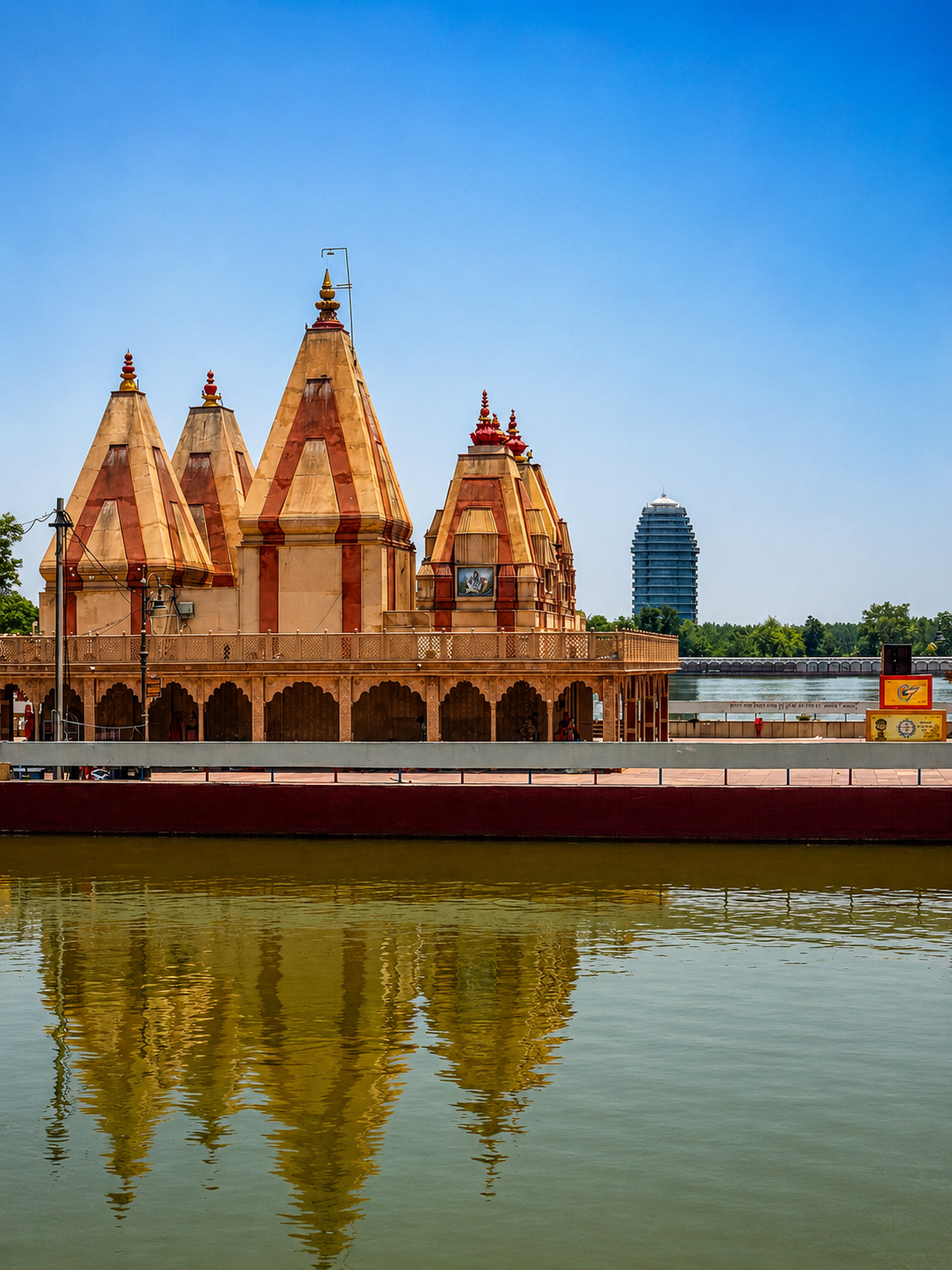
Brahma Sarovar Temple

=== Solar eclipse ritual ===
The pools are especially crowded during solar eclipses because it is believed that bathing there during the solar eclipse is an ablution of sin. On 29 March 2006, a solar eclipse in the region drew an estimated one million people to the site. Whenever an eclipse is visible from the Sarovar, hundreds of thousands gather in the pools.

=== Sri Krishna Chariot at Brahma Sarovar Kurukshetra ===
At the heart of Brahma Sarovar in Kurukshetra stands a monumental bronze chariot depicting Lord Krishna and Arjuna. This striking sculpture captures the iconic moment from the Bhagavad Gita, where Krishna delivers his divine counsel to Arjuna on the battlefield of Kurukshetra. The chariot is intricately designed, showcasing Krishna as the charioteer and Arjuna as the warrior, symbolizing the eternal dialogue between duty and righteousness.

== Credits ==
- Jagmohan (2005). Soul and Structure of Governance in India. Mumbai: Allied Publishers.
- Kamran, Krishnam (1997). Tourism: Theory, Planning, and Practice. New Delhi: Indus Publishing.
- (2006). "Kurukshetra Calling." The Statesman (India). 5 September.
- Prasad, Ramanuj (2005). Know Your Puranas. Delhi: Pustak Mahal.
