= Fatehpur, Yamunanagar =

Fatehpur
- village
- Location in Haryana, India Fatehpur (India)
- Coordinates: 30.124039°N 77.340558°E
- Country: India
- State: Haryana
- District: Yamunanagar
- Tehsil: Jagadhri

Government
  - Nambardar: Naresh Kamboj

Population (2011)
  - Total: 1,484

Languages
  - Official: Hindi
- Time zone: UTC+5:30 (IST)
- PIN: 135101
- Telephone code: 01732
- ISO 3166 code: IN-HR
- Vehicle registration: HR-02
- Sex ratio: 1103 ♂/♀
- Website: haryana.gov.in

Fatehpur is a village and gram panchayat in the Yamunanagar district of the Indian state of Haryana. Also known as Fatehpur-123, it falls under the jurisdiction of Jagadhri tehsil.

== History ==
Fatehpur village came into existence in the mid-19th century. It was founded by Fateh Singh Kamboj, after whom the village is named. It became a gram panchayat and its first appointed nambardar was Ch. Kundan Lal. Fatehpur Gram Panchayat used to consist of two villages namely Fatehpur and Behrampur. But in 2010 Behrampur got its own gram panchayat.

== Demographics ==
As of the 2011 Census of India, the village had 301 households with a total population of 1,484 of which 755 were male and 729 female. It is culturally a very diversified village as it is a home to many communities despite being a small village. Kambojs constitutes more than half of the total population. The rest of the population is constituted of Brahmins, Dalits, Banias and a few Muslim Telis.

== Infrastructure ==
Like all other villages of the state, Fatehpur has concrete roads and paved streets. Solar street lights are installed in every corner of the village under the Surya Urja Scheme. There is a government school in the village which provides education up to matriculation standard. It was established in 1983. The village has a post office, an old age home and a veterinary hospital. Separate chaupals have been built for Kambojs and Valmikis. There is also a community hall in the village which is hardly used by anyone.

== Gram panchayat ==
Fatehpur is a gram panchayat. Fatehpur is the only village under this gram panchayat. Nambardar is the government appointed caretaker of the village and is usually the most respected person of the village. The sarpanch is the elected head of this panchayat. Members of the panchayat or panchs are elected every five years along with the sarpanch. Ch. Naresh Kamboj is the present nambardar of Fatehpur and Ch. Chotu Ram was elected Sarpanch in Jan 2016.

== Jurisdiction ==
Fatehpur falls under the parliamentary constituency of Ambala and legislative assembly Yamuna Nagar. The present member of parliament is Rattan Lal Kataria and the MLA is Ghanshyam Das. It falls under ward no.11 of Zila Parishad, Yamuna Nagar and ward no.12 of Panchayat Samiti. It is also a part of tehsil Jagadhri.

== Eminent residents ==
- Naresh Kamboj is a leader of Congress and a member of Haryana Debt Conciliation Board and the Haryana Environment Protection Council.
- Dr. Rajender Kamboj is the president of the Novel Drug Discovery & Development division of the Indian pharmaceutical company Lupin Ltd.
