= Naresh Kamboj =

Indian politician

Member, Debt Conciliation Board, Govt. of Haryana
- Constituency: Yamunanagar
- Incumbent
- Assumed office 19 January 2007

Personal details
- Born: 27 May 1964 (age 62) Fatehpur village, Yamunanagar district, Haryana, India
- Party: Indian National Congress
- Spouse: Samita Kamboj
- Children: 2 sons
- Occupation: Politician, social worker, businessman

Naresh Kamboj (Hindi: नरेश कम्बोज) (Punjabi: ਨਰੇਸ਼ ਕਾਮ੍ਬੋਜ) (born 27 May 1964) is an Indian politician, a leader of the Indian National Congress and the currently member of Debt Conciliation Board, Govt. of Haryana. He became the member of Haryana Environment Protection Council for the first time in June 2006. In January 2007 he was appointed as the member of Debt Conciliation Board, Govt. of Haryana.

== Early life ==
Naresh Kamboj was born to Chaudhry Kishori Lal Kamboj, a renowned personality, in the village of Fatehpur in then Ambala district of Haryana, India which is now a part of Yamuna Nagar. His grandfather Chaudhry Kundan Lal Kamboj was also a known social activist in Ambala district. He is an alumnus of Mukand Lal National College. He did his B.A. at Kurukshetra University, Kurukshetra.

== Political career ==
Kamboj was born in a political family. His father was a respected Congress leader of Yamuna Nagar and was Sarpanch, Nambardaar as well as member of the Block Samiti. This encouraged him to join the politics. He got first taste of politics while studying in MLN College where he became the president of NSUI and later on he was elected as the president of Student's Union of the only college in the district in year 1982–1983. This victory gave a kickstart to his political career. In year 1991 he was elected as the Sarpanch of Gram Panchayat Fatehpur. In year 1991 he was elected as the member of Block Samiti, Jagadhri. Being a son of a farmer he started working for the welfare of farmers and subsequently became the president of district wing of Kisan Sangharsh Samiti and in 1996 he was spotted by the future Chief minister of Haryana Bhupinder Singh Hooda who urged him to join mainstream politics and appointed him as Block president, Chhachhrauli of Haryana Congress Committee as well as Senior Vice President of District Congress Committee, Yamuna Nagar. In 2000 Haryana Assembly elections, then State Congress Chief Hooda gave him the ticket from Chhachhrauli Legislative seat. But he lost the election by a considerable margin. Even after the defeat Hooda continued to show faith in him and in year 2002 appointed him as the Vice President of Haryana Kisan Khet Mazdoor Congress. In 2005 elections he was not given the ticket from Chhachhhrauli due to the re-emergence of Bhajan Lal in the congress. But subsequently Hooda was appointed as the Chief Minister of Haryana. And he repaid him for his continuous support by appointing him in various Government Committees. In 2006, he was appointed as the member of Haryana Environment Protection Council, an advisory committee which advises the Ministry of Environment over various matters. In January 2007 he was appointed as the member of Debt Conciliation Board, Govt. of Haryana which takes care of the debts of poor people in Haryana.

== Personal life ==
Naresh Kamboj married Samita Kamboj, a former member of Zila Parishad in 1985. They have two sons.

== Positions held ==
Year	Position	Party/Organisation
1982–1983	President, NSUI, Yamuna Nagar	NSUI
1991–1993	Member, Block Samiti (Jagadhri)	Independent
1996–1999	President, Block Congress Committee, Chhachhrauli	INC
1998–2002	Sr. Vice President, District. Congress Committee (Yamuna Nagar)	INC
2002–2006	Vice President, Haryana Kisan Khet Mazdoor Congress	INC
2006–2011	Member, Haryana Environment Protection Council	INC
2007–present	Member, Debt Conciliation Board, Govt. of Haryana	INC

== Social views ==
Naresh Kamboj is a supporter and the follower of the Arya Samaj movement. He is a follower of the ideas and principles of Dayanand Saraswati. He has repeatedly shown concern about the position of Muslims in Haryana. He works with the Muslims of Yamuna Nagar for development and education of their children.
