= Parkash =

Parkash is a surname and a given name. Notable people with the name include:

Surname:

- Chander Parkash, Indian politician
- Jai Parkash (born 1954), Indian politician
- Prem Parkash (1932–2025), Indian writer
- Som Parkash (born 1949), Indian politician
- Swaraj Parkash, Flag officer in the Indian Navy
- Ved Parkash, Indian politician

Given name:

- Parkash Singh Badal (1927–2023), Indian politician and Sikh rights advocate
- Om Parkash Barwa, Indian politician
- Jai Parkash Dalal, Indian politician
- Parkash Chand Garg, Indian politician
- Parkash Gian (born 1937), Indian wrestler
- Ram Parkash Lakha, Lord Mayor of Coventry (2005–2006)
- Chander Parkash Rahi, Punjabi writer who writes in English
- Parkash Singh (1913–1991), Sikh Indian recipient of the Victoria Cross
- Tej Parkash Singh, Indian Politician
- Om Parkash Soni, Indian politician
- Jai Parkash Ukrani, Pakistani politician
- Om Parkash Yadav, Indian politician

== See also ==
- Parkash Memorial Deaf & dumb school, a school for deaf-mute children in Rupnagar, Punjab, India
- Jhatka Parkash, a book written by Giani Niranjan Singh Saral concerning Jhatka and Meat eating in the Sikh Religion
- Seth Jai Parkash Mukand Lal Institute of Engineering and Technology, private college of Engineering in Radaur, Haryana, India
- Om Parkash Jogender Singh University, Private University located in Churu District of Rajasthan, India
