= Yamunanagar Assembly constituency =

Constituency of the Haryana legislative assembly in India

Coordinates: 30.13°N 77.27°E

Yamunanagar
- Constituency No. 9 for the Haryana Legislative Assembly

Constituency details
- Country: India
- Region: North India
- State: Haryana
- Lok Sabha constituency: Ambala
- Established: 1967
- Total electors: 2,41,610
- Reservation: None

Member of Legislative Assembly
- 15th Haryana Legislative Assembly
- Incumbent Ghanshyam Dass
- Party: Bharatiya Janata Party
- Elected year: 2019

Yamunanagar Assembly constituency is one of the 90 assembly seats of Haryana, India. It is a part of Yamunanagar district and includes Yamunanagar city. It comes under Ambala (Lok Sabha constituency) for national elections.

== Members of the Legislative Assembly ==
| Year | Member | Party |
|---|---|---|
| 1967 | B. Dayal | Indian National Congress |
| 1968 | Malikchand Gambhir | Bharatiya Jana Sangh |
| 1972 | Girish Chandra | Indian National Congress |
| 1977 | Kamla Verma | Janata Party |
| 1982 | Rajesh Kumar | Indian National Congress |
| 1987 | Kamla Verma | Bharatiya Janata Party |
| 1991 | Rajesh Kumar | Indian National Congress |
| 1996 | Kamla Verma | Bharatiya Janata Party |
| 2000 | Jai Prakash Shrama | Indian National Congress |
| 2005 | Krishna Pandit | Indian National Congress |
| 2009 | Dilbagh Singh | Indian National Lok Dal |
| 2014 | Ghanshyam Dass | Bharatiya Janata Party |
| 2019 | Ghanshyam Dass | Bharatiya Janata Party |
| 2024 | Ghanshyam Dass | Bharatiya Janata Party |

== Election results ==
=== Assembly Election 2024 ===
2024 Haryana Legislative Assembly election: Yamunanagar
| Party | Candidate | Votes | % | ±% |
|---|---|---|---|---|
| BJP | Ghanshyam Dass | 73,185 | 44.62 | ▲1.60 |
| INC | Raman Tyagi | 50,748 | 30.94 | ▲24.45 |
| INLD | Dilbag Singh | 36,067 | 21.99 | ▼20.06 |
| AAP | Lalit Kumar Tyagi | 1,655 | 1.01 | ▲0.60 |
| NOTA | None of the Above | 735 | 0.45 | ▼0.32 |
| Margin of victory | | 22,437 | 13.68 | ▲12.71 |
| Turnout | | 1,64,013 | 67.49 | ▲0.27 |
| Registered electors | | 2,41,610 | | ▲8.37 |
| BJP hold | | Swing | ▲1.60 | |

=== Assembly Election 2019 ===
2019 Haryana Legislative Assembly election: Yamunanagar
| Party | Candidate | Votes | % | ±% |
|---|---|---|---|---|
| BJP | Ghanshyam Dass | 64,848 | 43.02 | ▼8.47 |
| INLD | Dilbagh Singh | 63,393 | 42.05 | ▲8.80 |
| INC | Nirmal Chauhan | 9,784 | 6.49 | ▲0.29 |
| BSP | Yogesh Kumar | 7,731 | 5.13 | ▼1.57 |
| JJP | Salesh Tyagi | 2,039 | 1.35 | New |
| NOTA | Nota | 1,164 | 0.77 | ▲0.20 |
| AAP | Arvinder Singh Khalsa | 615 | 0.41 | New |
| Margin of victory | | 1,455 | 0.97 | ▼17.27 |
| Turnout | | 1,50,749 | 67.22 | ▼9.17 |
| Registered electors | | 2,24,251 | | ▲10.61 |
| BJP hold | | Swing | ▼8.47 | |

=== Assembly Election 2014 ===
2014 Haryana Legislative Assembly election: Yamunanagar
| Party | Candidate | Votes | % | ±% |
|---|---|---|---|---|
| BJP | Ghanshyam Dass | 79,743 | 51.49 | ▲37.74 |
| INLD | Dilbagh Singh | 51,498 | 33.25 | ▼8.35 |
| BSP | Arvind Kumar Sharma | 10,367 | 6.69 | ▼1.90 |
| INC | Dr. Krishna Pandit | 9,603 | 6.20 | ▼23.39 |
| NOTA | None of the Above | 882 | 0.57 | New |
| Margin of victory | | 28,245 | 18.24 | ▲6.22 |
| Turnout | | 1,54,873 | 76.39 | ▲2.79 |
| Registered electors | | 2,02,733 | | ▲32.13 |
| BJP gain from INLD | | Swing | ▲9.88 | |

=== Assembly Election 2009 ===
2009 Haryana Legislative Assembly election: Yamunanagar
| Party | Candidate | Votes | % | ±% |
|---|---|---|---|---|
| INLD | Dilbagh Singh | 46,984 | 41.61 | ▲22.96 |
| INC | Devinder Chawla | 33,411 | 29.59 | ▼18.61 |
| BJP | Ghanshyam Dass | 15,526 | 13.75 | ▼9.51 |
| BSP | Roshan Lal | 9,702 | 8.59 | ▲2.04 |
| HJC(BL) | Shushil Kumar | 1,631 | 1.44 | New |
| RJD | Harjinder Singh | 1,514 | 1.34 | ▲0.59 |
| Independent | Suresh Pal | 1,007 | 0.89 | New |
| Independent | Jarib Hassan | 619 | 0.55 | New |
| Margin of victory | | 13,573 | 12.02 | ▼12.92 |
| Turnout | | 1,12,928 | 73.60 | ▲6.82 |
| Registered electors | | 1,53,439 | | ▲4.27 |
| INLD gain from INC | | Swing | ▼6.59 | |

=== Assembly Election 2005 ===
2005 Haryana Legislative Assembly election: Yamunanagar
| Party | Candidate | Votes | % | ±% |
|---|---|---|---|---|
| INC | Dr. Krishna Pandit | 47,360 | 48.20 | ▲24.45 |
| BJP | Ghanshyam Dass | 22,851 | 23.25 | ▲2.67 |
| INLD | Sahib Singh | 18,319 | 18.64 | New |
| BSP | Nand Lal | 6,436 | 6.55 | ▼12.80 |
| Independent | Surya Parkash | 749 | 0.76 | New |
| RJD | Noor Mohmed | 734 | 0.75 | New |
| Independent | Mohinder Gupta | 627 | 0.64 | New |
| Margin of victory | | 24,509 | 24.94 | ▲21.78 |
| Turnout | | 98,267 | 66.78 | ▲7.14 |
| Registered electors | | 1,47,154 | | ▲0.48 |
| INC hold | | Swing | ▲24.45 | |

=== Assembly Election 2000 ===
2000 Haryana Legislative Assembly election: Yamunanagar
| Party | Candidate | Votes | % | ±% |
|---|---|---|---|---|
| INC | Dr. Jai Parkash Sharma | 20,742 | 23.75 | ▲10.03 |
| BJP | Kamla Verma | 17,978 | 20.58 | ▼14.91 |
| BSP | Randhir Singh | 16,897 | 19.35 | ▲8.09 |
| HVP | Sahib Singh | 13,953 | 15.98 | New |
| Independent | Ashok Kumar | 12,013 | 13.75 | New |
| NCP | Pawan Kumar Dhiman | 1,944 | 2.23 | New |
| Independent | Satpal Mehta Ghoriwala | 1,456 | 1.67 | New |
| JD(S) | Dr. Joginder Pal Saini | 1,144 | 1.31 | New |
| SP | Ram Kinker Dass | 624 | 0.71 | New |
| Independent | Gorakh Nath Bhardwaj | 588 | 0.67 | New |
| Margin of victory | | 2,764 | 3.16 | ▼14.13 |
| Turnout | | 87,339 | 59.65 | ▼4.64 |
| Registered electors | | 1,46,445 | | ▼6.74 |
| INC gain from BJP | | Swing | ▼11.75 | |

=== Assembly Election 1996 ===
1996 Haryana Legislative Assembly election: Yamunanagar
| Party | Candidate | Votes | % | ±% |
|---|---|---|---|---|
| BJP | Kamla Verma | 35,825 | 35.50 | ▲8.33 |
| Independent | Malik Chand | 18,369 | 18.20 | New |
| INC | Rajesh Kumar Sharma | 13,842 | 13.71 | ▼20.26 |
| BSP | Shamsher Singh | 11,361 | 11.26 | ▼4.08 |
| AIIC(T) | Raj Kumar Tyagi | 8,301 | 8.22 | New |
| SAP | Kamla Dutta | 7,208 | 7.14 | New |
| JD | Ram Kishan | 841 | 0.83 | New |
| Independent | Naresh Kumar | 634 | 0.63 | New |
| Independent | Dev Raj | 619 | 0.61 | New |
| Independent | Ram Kikkar Dass | 599 | 0.59 | New |
| Independent | Maghru Parshad | 532 | 0.53 | New |
| Margin of victory | | 17,456 | 17.30 | ▲10.49 |
| Turnout | | 1,00,928 | 66.16 | ▲3.62 |
| Registered electors | | 1,57,026 | | ▲25.00 |
| BJP gain from INC | | Swing | ▲1.52 | |

=== Assembly Election 1991 ===
1991 Haryana Legislative Assembly election: Yamunanagar
| Party | Candidate | Votes | % | ±% |
|---|---|---|---|---|
| INC | Rajesh Kumar Sharma | 25,885 | 33.97 | ▲5.62 |
| BJP | Kamla Verma | 20,699 | 27.17 | ▼17.21 |
| JP | Balinde Singh | 13,036 | 17.11 | ▲13.09 |
| BSP | Tayub Hussain | 11,688 | 15.34 | New |
| HVP | Ram Dia | 2,886 | 3.79 | New |
| Margin of victory | | 5,186 | 6.81 | ▼9.21 |
| Turnout | | 76,197 | 62.38 | ▼6.57 |
| Registered electors | | 1,25,617 | | ▲19.58 |
| INC gain from BJP | | Swing | ▼10.40 | |

=== Assembly Election 1987 ===
1987 Haryana Legislative Assembly election: Yamunanagar
| Party | Candidate | Votes | % | ±% |
|---|---|---|---|---|
| BJP | Kamla Verma | 31,336 | 44.37 | ▲15.24 |
| INC | Rajesh Kumar Sharma | 20,024 | 28.35 | ▼0.89 |
| Independent | Dharam Singh | 7,830 | 11.09 | New |
| JP | Mahinder Kumar | 2,841 | 4.02 | ▼2.39 |
| Independent | Prem Lal | 2,332 | 3.30 | New |
| Independent | Daulat Ram | 1,628 | 2.31 | New |
| Independent | Pratap Singh | 1,349 | 1.91 | New |
| Independent | Ashok Kumar | 947 | 1.34 | New |
| Independent | Brahm Singh | 935 | 1.32 | New |
| Margin of victory | | 11,312 | 16.02 | ▲15.90 |
| Turnout | | 70,623 | 68.04 | ▼1.85 |
| Registered electors | | 1,05,051 | | ▲30.27 |
| BJP gain from INC | | Swing | ▲15.13 | |

=== Assembly Election 1982 ===
1982 Haryana Legislative Assembly election: Yamunanagar
| Party | Candidate | Votes | % | ±% |
|---|---|---|---|---|
| INC | Rajesh Kumar Sharma | 16,289 | 29.24 | ▲6.91 |
| BJP | Kamla Verma | 16,226 | 29.13 | New |
| Independent | Prem Lal | 5,994 | 10.76 | New |
| Independent | Joga Singh | 5,204 | 9.34 | New |
| CPI | Deveshwar | 4,477 | 8.04 | New |
| JP | Mahandar Gupta | 3,571 | 6.41 | ▼57.74 |
| Independent | Vimal Kumar | 1,191 | 2.14 | New |
| Independent | Shiv Lal | 959 | 1.72 | New |
| Independent | Bakharu Singh | 527 | 0.95 | New |
| Independent | Mahesh | 407 | 0.73 | New |
| Independent | Ram Kishan | 381 | 0.68 | New |
| Margin of victory | | 63 | 0.11 | ▼41.71 |
| Turnout | | 55,707 | 70.20 | ▲4.14 |
| Registered electors | | 80,639 | | ▲17.48 |
| INC gain from JP | | Swing | ▼34.91 | |

=== Assembly Election 1977 ===
1977 Haryana Legislative Assembly election: Yamunanagar
| Party | Candidate | Votes | % | ±% |
|---|---|---|---|---|
| JP | Kamla Devi | 28,596 | 64.15 | New |
| INC | Girish Chandra | 9,953 | 22.33 | ▼17.35 |
| Independent | Dalip Singh | 5,832 | 13.08 | New |
| Margin of victory | | 18,643 | 41.82 | ▲36.66 |
| Turnout | | 44,574 | 65.46 | ▼3.90 |
| Registered electors | | 68,640 | | ▲0.99 |
| JP gain from INC | | Swing | | |

=== Assembly Election 1972 ===
1972 Haryana Legislative Assembly election: Yamunanagar
| Party | Candidate | Votes | % | ±% |
|---|---|---|---|---|
| INC | Garish Chander | 18,565 | 39.68 | ▲13.29 |
| ABJS | Malik Chand | 16,147 | 34.51 | ▼2.61 |
| CPI | Balbir Singh | 6,787 | 14.51 | New |
| Independent | Tulsi Dass | 2,676 | 5.72 | New |
| Independent | Babu Ram | 2,347 | 5.02 | New |
| Independent | Surjit Singh | 268 | 0.57 | New |
| Margin of victory | | 2,418 | 5.17 | ▼3.81 |
| Turnout | | 46,790 | 70.47 | ▲18.03 |
| Registered electors | | 67,969 | | ▲25.14 |
| INC gain from ABJS | | Swing | ▲2.56 | |

=== Assembly Election 1968 ===
1968 Haryana Legislative Assembly election: Yamunanagar
| Party | Candidate | Votes | % | ±% |
|---|---|---|---|---|
| ABJS | Malik Chand | 10,243 | 37.12 | ▲0.44 |
| Independent | Bhupinder Singh | 7,765 | 28.14 | New |
| INC | Shannd Devi | 7,281 | 26.38 | ▼26.05 |
| Independent | Bhakheru Singh | 3,984 | 14.44 | New |
| VHP | Jishan Lal | 3,971 | 14.39 | New |
| Independent | Puna | 521 | 1.89 | New |
| SWA | Dharam Paul | 486 | 1.76 | New |
| RPI | Natha Ram | 470 | 1.70 | New |
| Independent | Takki Mohamad | 256 | 0.93 | New |
| Margin of victory | | 2,478 | 8.98 | ▼6.78 |
| Turnout | | 27,598 | 52.51 | ▼22.39 |
| Registered electors | | 54,313 | | ▼5.43 |
| ABJS gain from INC | | Swing | ▼15.32 | |

=== Assembly Election 1967 ===
1967 Haryana Legislative Assembly election: Yamunanagar
| Party | Candidate | Votes | % | ±% |
|---|---|---|---|---|
| INC | B. Dayal | 22,043 | 52.43 | New |
| ABJS | R. Lal | 15,419 | 36.68 | New |
| PSP | J. Gopal | 4,121 | 9.80 | New |
| Independent | A. Chander | 456 | 1.08 | New |
| Margin of victory | | 6,624 | 15.76 | |
| Turnout | | 42,039 | 75.87 | |
| Registered electors | | 57,429 | | |
| INC win (new seat) | | | | |
