= Radaur =

- Town
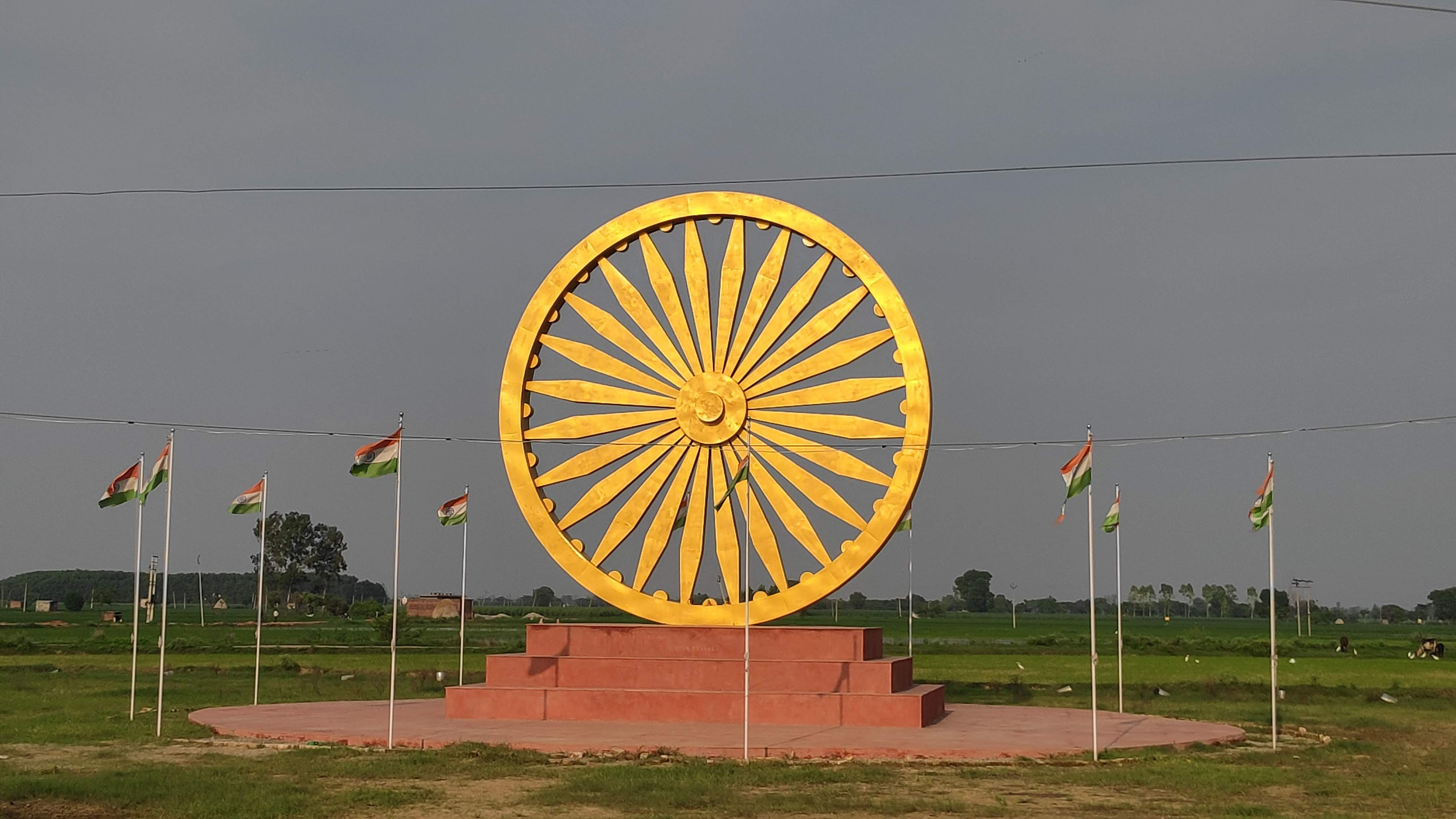
- Front view of Ashok Satambh Park at Topra (Yamunanagar district, Haryana)

- Location in Haryana, India Radaur (India)
- Coordinates: 30.03°N 77.15°E
- Country: India
- State: Haryana
- District: Yamunanagar
- Elevation: 260 m (850 ft)

Population (2011)
  - Total: 13,690

Languages
  - Official: Hindi
  - Additional official: English; Punjabi
  - Regional: Haryanvi
- Time zone: UTC+5:30 (IST)
- Postal code: 135133
- Telephone code: 01732
- ISO 3166 code: IN-HR
- Vehicle registration: HR 92
- Website: haryana.gov.in

Radaur is a town and municipal committee in Yamunanagar district in the Indian state of Haryana. It approx. 17 km from Yamunanagar, the district headquarters.

== Demographics ==
As of 2011 Indian Census, Radaur had a total population of 13,690, of which 7,250 were males and 6,440 were females. Population within the age group of 0 to 6 years was 1,467. The total number of literates in Radaur was 10,380, which constituted 75.8% of the population with male literacy of 78.9% and female literacy of 72.4%. The effective literacy rate of 7+ population of Radaur was 84.9%, of which male literacy rate was 89.5% and female literacy rate was 79.9%. The Scheduled Castes population was 2,410. Radaur had 2794 households in 2011.

As of 2001 India census, Radaur had a population of 11,737, of which 6,164 were males and 5,573 were females. Population in the age range of 0 to 6 years was 1,397. Radaur had an average literacy rate of 71.5%, male literacy was 75.8%, and female literacy was 66.8%.

== Education ==
- Seth Jai Parkash Mukand Lal Institute of Engineering and Technology
- Mukand Lal National College
