= Sasauli =

Sasauli Sasouli
- Census town
- Location in Haryana, India Sasauli (India)
- Coordinates: 30.1439°N 77.2596°E
- Country: India
- State: Haryana
- District: Yamunanagar

Population (2001)
  - Total: 15,753

Languages
  - Official: Hindi
- Time zone: UTC+5:30 (IST)
- ISO 3166 code: IN-HR
- Vehicle registration: HR
- Website: haryana.gov.in

Sasauli is a census town in Yamunanagar district in the Indian state of Haryana.

== Demographics ==
As of 2001 India census, Sasouli had a population of 15,753. Males constitute 54% of the population and females 46%. Sasouli has an average literacy rate of 78%, higher than the national average of 59.5%: male literacy is 84%, and female literacy is 71%. In Sasouli, 10% of the population is under 6 years of age.
