= Munda Majra =

Former village in India

Munda Majra is a village in tahsil Jagadhri of Yamunanagar district in Haryana, India. It was merged into the Yamuna Nagar Municipal Corporation. The village has preserved its heritage, notwithstanding the fact that independent identity of this village has merged with Yamuna Nagar. Yamuna Nagar was known by the name Abdulla Pur.

== Location ==
The population of the village Munda Majra is primarily located at 30°07'50.5"N,77°18'05.8"E between Tejli Sports Stadium to the north, Shashtri Colony to the south, Western Yamuna Canal to the east, and Model Colony to the west side.
