= Kamla Verma =

Indian politician (1928–2021)

Kamla Verma (1928 – 8 June 2021) was an Indian politician who served three terms as a member of the Haryana Legislative Assembly for Yamunanagar (1977–1981, 1987–1991 and 1996–2000).

== Biography ==
Verma was born in Gujranwala (now in Punjab, Pakistan). She studied Ayurveda and was associated with Arya Samaj before entering politics. She was president of state unit of Bharatiya Janata Party (BJP) from 1980 to 1983 and earlier of Jan Sangh. Verma was imprisoned for 19 months during the 1975–1977 "Emergency" in India. She served as a cabinet minister in the ministries headed by Devi Lal.

Verma died due to COVID-19–associated mucormycosis on 8 June 2021, at a private hospital in Jagadhri, Haryana.
