= Darshan Lal Jain =

Indian social activist (1927–2021)

- Born: 12 December 1927; Jagadhri, Haryana
- Died: 8 February 2021 (aged 93)
- Occupation: Social activist
- Awards: Padma Bhushan

Darshan Lal Jain (12 December 1927 – 8 February 2021) was an Indian social activist, who was awarded Padma Bhushan, India's third highest civilian award, in 2019 for his contribution in social work. He was known for educating young girls and financially troubled children.

He was the founder of various schools and colleges in Haryana, including Saraswati Vidya Mandir, Jagadhri (1954), DAV College for Girls, Yamunanagar, Bharat Vikas Parishad Haryana, Vivekanand Rock Memorial Society, Vanvasi Kalyan Ashram Haryana, Hindu Shiksha Samiti Haryana, Geeta Niketan Residential School, Kurukshetra, and Nand Lal Geeta Vidya Mandir, Ambala (1997).

== Early life ==
Darshan Lal Jain was born on 12 December 1927 in Jagadhri into a religious and industrialist Jain family. He is known as Babuji. As he grew up, he came in contact with RSS due to the feeling of patriotism. At the age 15, he participated in the Quit India Movement. He was sent to prison during the Emergency in 1975–1977 for working against the anti-people policies of the government. In 2007, Darshan Lal formed the warrior honor committee to remember the forgotten heroes of the nation. The committee held several ceremonies including the second war hero of Panipat, the coronation ceremony of Hemachandra Vikramaditya. He worked towards the education of the society and laid the foundation stone of Saraswati Vidya Mandir in 1954. He went on to establish Nand Lal Geeta Vidya Mandir and since its foundation in 1997, the school has been providing free education and free boarding to needy and intelligent students from Haryana, North East and Jammu and Kashmir.

== Awards ==
In 2019, The Government of Indian awarded him the Padma Bhushan Award for his outstanding work in the field of social service.
