= Fatehpur, Haryana =

Fatehpur, Haryana may refer to:

- Fatehpur, Kaithal, a panchayat village in Kaithal district
- Fatehpur, Yamunanagar, a village and gram panchayat in Yamunanagar district
