= Maharaja Agrasen Institute of Management and Technology =

Institute in Haryana, India

Coordinates: 30.15200029°N 77.3130357°E

Maharaja Agrasen Institute of Management and Technology, Jagadhri, Yamuna Nagar
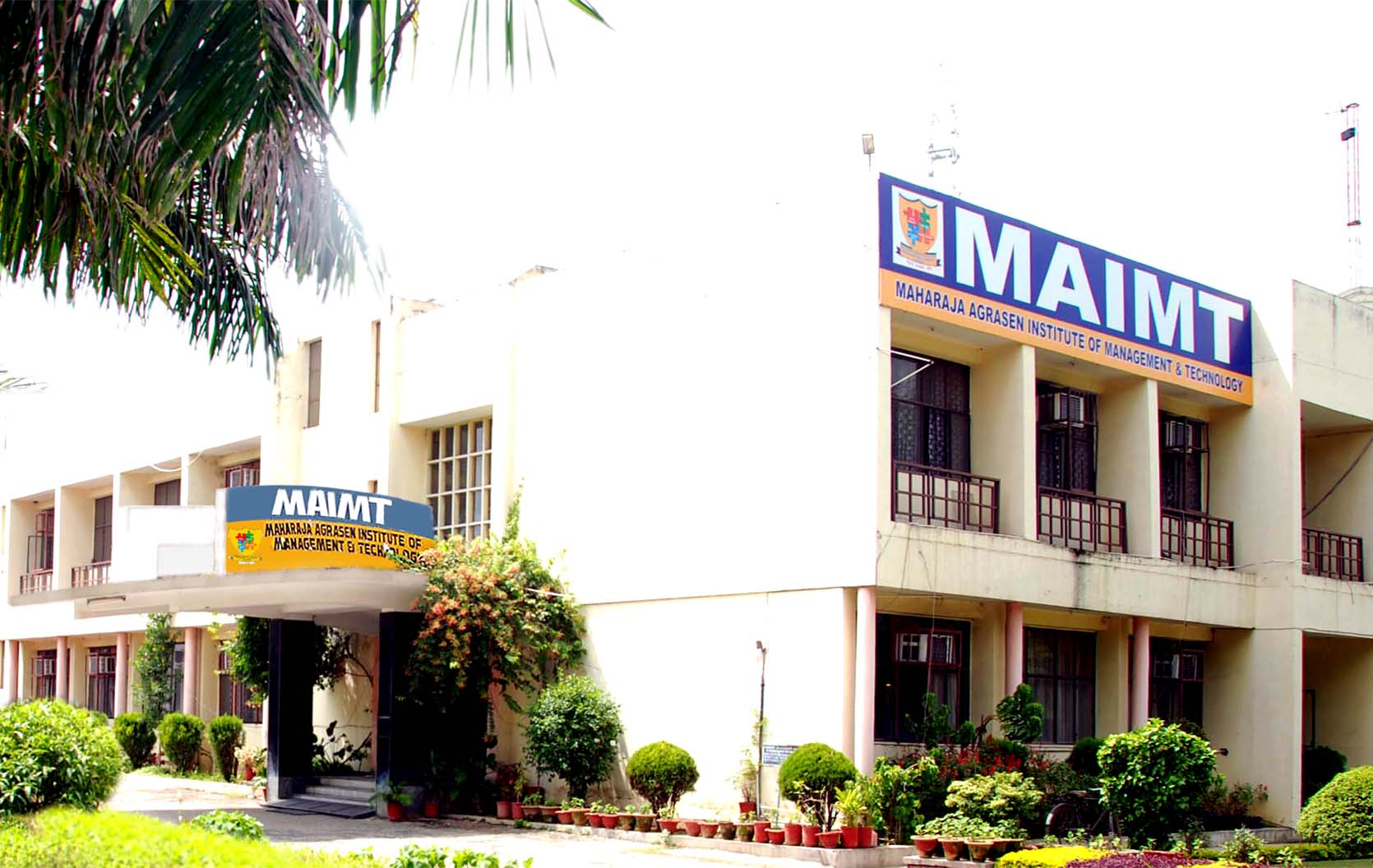
- Motto in English: "The intricacies of actions are very mysterious"
- Type: Self-Financing
- Established: 1997
- Affiliations: Kurukshetra University, AICTE, UGC, NAAC
- President: Sh. Sushil Gupta
- Vice-president: Sh. Parveen Goel
- Director: Dr. Narinder Rana
- Faculty: 60+
- Students: 1100
- Undergraduates: 700
- Postgraduates: 400
- Location: Yamuna Nagar, Haryana 135003, India
- Campus: 3.5 acres (1.4 ha); Urban
- Nickname: MAIMT
- Website: www.maimt.com

Maharaja Agrasen Institute of Management and Technology (MAIMT) was founded in 1997, it is affiliated to NAAC A++ Grade Kurukshetra University and approved by AICTE. It is located in Jagadhri, district Yamunanagar, Haryana near Chandigarh. It is being run by non profitable trust Maharaja Agrasen Sabha which runs another college named Maharaja Agrasen College. MAIMT is the oldest management institute in Yamunanagar, Haryana and has BCA and MCA courses with specialisations in Artificial Intelligence, Cloud Technology and Network Security and BBA and MBA with specialisation in HR, Finance, Marketing and Digital Marketing.

== Academics ==
The institute provides graduate and post graduate courses in computer application and management.

Bachelor of Business Administration (BBA) : MAIMT has BBA with specialisation of Human Resource, Finance and Digital Marketing. The eligibility for admission in BBA is 10+2 in any stream from a recognised board with at least 50% marks and English as one of the subject. BBA is a 3 years undergraduate and 4 years honours course and fee for the course is Rs. 60000 per annum.

Bachelor of Computer Application (BCA) : MAIMT has BCA in specialisation of Artificial Intelligence (AI) and Cloud Technology and Information Security (CTIS). The eligibility for admission in BCA is 10+2 in any stream from a recognised board with at least 50% marks and English as one of the subject. BCA is a 3 years undergraduate and 4 years honours course and fee for the course is Rs. 60000 per annum.

Master of Business Administration (MBA) : MAIMT has MBA in specialisation of Human Resource, Finance and Digital Marketing. The eligibility for admission in BCA is Bachelor’s Degree of three years duration in any discipline from Kurukshetra University or from any recognised University with not less than 50% marks in the aggregate. MBA is a 2 years postgraduate course and fee for the course is Rs. 80000 per annum.

Master of Computer Application (MCA) : The eligibility for admission in MCA is Bachelor’s Degree of three years duration in any discipline from Kurukshetra University or from any recognized University with not less than 50% marks in the aggregate. MCA is a 2 years postgraduate course and fee for the course is Rs. 80000 per annum.
