= SDPS =

SDPS can refer to:

- S.D. Public School, Jagadhri
- Social Democratic Party of Serbia (Socijaldemokratska partija Srbije), a political party in Serbia
- Social Democratic Party "Harmony", a political party in Latvia
- Standard Dial-up POP3 Service, extensions to POP3 that allow multiple accounts per domain
