= HEPC =

HEPC may refer to:

- Hepatitis C, a disease
- Hepcidin, a peptide hormone
- Hydrogenated egg phosphatidylcholine
- Haryana Environment Protection Council, India
