= Kansapur, Yamunanagar =

Kansapur
- village
- Location in Haryana, India Kansapur (India)
- Coordinates: 30.246018°N 77.136177°E
- Country: India
- State: Haryana

Languages
  - Official: Hindi
- Time zone: UTC+5:30 (IST)
- Vehicle registration: HR
- Website: haryana.gov.in

Kansapur is a village in Yamuna Nagar, India. It has a population of about 15,000. It is mainly inhabited by Hindus and Muslims.

Kansapur falls under the Panchayat of Kansapur village and Assembly seat of Yamuna Nagar. Current sarpanch of Kansapur village is Narender Rana.
