= Kansepur =

- town
- Location in Haryana, India Kansepur (India)
- Coordinates: 30.15598°N 77.26987°E
- Country: India
- State: Haryana
- District: Yamunanagar

Population (2001)
  - Total: 14,943

Languages
  - Official: Hindi
- Time zone: UTC+5:30 (IST)
- ISO 3166 code: IN-HR
- Vehicle registration: HR
- Website: haryana.gov.in

Kansepur is a census town in Yamunanagar district in the Indian state of Haryana.

== Demographics ==
As of 2001 India census, Kansepur had a population of 14,943. Males constitute 53% of the population and females 47%. Kansepur has an average literacy rate of 71%, higher than the national average of 59.5%: male literacy is 77%, and female literacy is 65%. In Kansepur, 12% of the population is under 6 years of age.
