= Kanalsi =

Village in India

Coordinates: 30°08′52″N 77°23′22″E

Kanalsi is a village situated near Yamuna river in Yamunanagar district of Haryana state in India. It is about 16.5 km from Yamunanagar city, 82 km from Ambala and 112 km from Chandigarh.
