= Ghanshyam Dass =

Indian politician

Ghanshyam Dass Arora

Member of the Haryana Legislative Assembly
- Incumbent
- Assumed office 2014
- Preceded by: Dilbag Singh (INLD)
- Constituency: Yamunanagar

Personal details
- Born: 13 August 1952 (age 74) Yamunanagar, Haryana
- Party: Bharatiya Janata Party
- Spouse: Smt. Sukhda
- Education: Panjab University, Chandigarh
- Profession: Politician, agriculturist, industrialist

Ghanshyam Dass is a member of the Haryana Legislative Assembly from the BJP representing the Yamuna Nagar Vidhan sabha Constituency in Haryana.

Ghanshyam Dass Arora (Hindi :घनश्याम दास अरोड़ा, Punjabi : ਘਨਸ਼ਿਆਮ ਦਾਸ ਅਰੋੜਾ) (son of Sh. Arjun Dass) was born on 13 August 1952. Arora is a Bhartiya Janata Party politician and is currently MLA of 13th legislative assembly of Haryana from Yamunanagar constituency. In 2014 he won Vidhan Sabha elections with a margin of 28245 votes. He joined Rashtriya Swayamsevak Sangh (RSS) in 1967 & became active member of Sangh.

== Early and personal life ==
Arora was born and brought up at KareraKhurd village (Yamunanagar). His father was a farmer and belonged to an ordinary family. During his life Arora wore many hats and played a versatile role. Due to this he became ideal father, husband, philanthropist and ideal (MLA).

== Education ==
Ghanshyam Dass Arora started his education from local government school and scored good marks in metric class. His parents decided to give him higher education, so after completing secondary education Arora took admission in Panjab University in BA stream. Besides good education Arora had charismatic personality, numerous times he participated in college activities. After BA he did LLB from Punjab University and was among top ranked students of university. During LLB Ghanshyam Dass was elected as a member of debating society and also won the election of class representative in 1977–78. He got third position in Punjab University.

== Career ==
Ghanshyam Dass had a good knowledge of law but he decided to use this knowledge for the betterment of society and he is always ready to help the society in every manner. He has served as State Secretary, General Secretary and Vice President of Kisan Sangh from 1977 to 2002. He also took part in four successful agitations with sugar cane farmers in Yamunanagar from 1996 to 2001 for better prices of sugar cane and timely payment to farmer resulting in benefits of crores of rupees to farmers. During his tenure as General Secretary of Kisan Sangh he also took part in agitation against Mandi Board and Haryana State Electricity Board for benefits of farmers.

== Political career ==
In 2003, he was elected as District President of Yamunanagar for Bhartiya Janata Party (BJP). In 2006, Arora served as a State Gen. Secretary in "Kisan Morcha" of BJP Haryana. In 2005, he contested from Yamunanagar and lost. Again in 2009, he contested and lost the election from the same seat. From 2009 to 2012, Arora has worked as "State General Secretary" in BJP. In 2014, he won the Yamunanagar seat in the Legislative Assembly of Haryana by a margin of 28245 votes. He is state convener of BJP Prasikshan Cell (Haryana). Arora was also selected as Chairman of Petition Committee (Haryana Legislative Assembly) from October 2014 to March 2017. In 2019, he won again from Yamunanagar and made record of being elected for consecutive second term from yamunanagar, then in 2024 election he won for a record third time.

== Occupation ==
Ghanshyam Das Arora is a BJP Politician, an Agriculturist and a renowned Industrialist of District Yamunanagar.

== Family ==
Arora lives in a joint family. He has two children Saurabh and Muskaan. He has two brothers Sham Sundar and Radhey Shyam, both married and have further children who look after family business.

On 16 November 2018, Sham sundar was killed in a motorcycle accident in Yamunanagar.

== Social Activities ==
He served as General Secretary of SD Public School (Jagadhri) for 6 years. He is presently patron of Sanatan Dharam Sabha.
