= Farakhpur =

- Census town
- Location in Haryana, India Farakhpur (India)
- Coordinates: 30.136962°N 77.206206°E
- Country: India
- State: Haryana
- District: Yamunanagar

Population (2001)
  - Total: 8,738

Languages
  - Official: Hindi
- Time zone: UTC+5:30 (IST)
- ISO 3166 code: IN-HR
- Vehicle registration: HR
- Website: haryana.gov.in

Farakhpur is a census town in Yamunanagar district in the state of Haryana, India.

== Demographics ==
As of 2001 India census, Farakhpur had a population of 8738. Males constitute 54% of the population and females 46%. Farakhpur has an average literacy rate of 74%, higher than the national average of 59.5%: male literacy is 79%, and female literacy is 67%. In Farakhpur, 13% of the population is under 6 years of age.
