= Mandkheri =

Mandkheri or Mand Kheri is a village in Haryana, India. It is located in the Yamunanagar district, and is administered by the town of Chhachhrauli. It is named after Rishi Mandya whose gotra is Mandap. Famous Personalities 1. Ram Karan - Ex surpunch made roads of Mandkheri concrete 2. Krishan Chand Sharma - Ex sarpunch who developed drainge system of mandkheri. 3. Sukhjeet singh - A famous Maths Teacher 4. Karam Chand - A famous Cricketer 5. Purshotam lal Sharma - An Amazing teacher who transformed many lives. 6. Pankaj Sharma (great-grandson of Krishan Chand) - A famous Entrepreneur. 7. Dilbag Sheoran Swaggy personality of the area. The village has a population of roughly 5,000 people.
