= Sacred Heart School, Jagadhri =

Sacred Heart Convent Senior Secondary School

Location
- Sacred Heart Convent School, Jagadhri, Haryana, India; 30.1461656°N 77.3063503°E

Information
- Type: Convent run Private School
- Motto: "Love Conquers All"
- Established: 1966; 60 years ago
- Principal: Sr. Jesina S.D – present
- Grades: Kindergarten – Intermediate
- Campus: Urban
- Affiliations: Central Board of Secondary Education(C.B.S.E), New Delhi
- Website: http://www.shcsjagadhri.org

Sacred Heart Convent School is an English-medium Catholic education private school run by the Congregation of the Sisters of the Destitute in the city of Jagadhri, India. It is affiliated to CBSE

The school has education levels from kindergarten to 12th (Plus Two). There are two kindergarten levels, both aimed at preparing girls for school. The first is similar to a playschool, rather than emphasising intellectual achievement.

== Admissions ==
Students are admitted at the beginning of the school year, which commences in mid-March.

== Academics ==
Computer science is taught as a compulsory subject until ninth standard, where students can choose to continue with the subject or choose a different stream of subjects. The school is equipped with a lab for computer literacy and programming courses. The computer and basic science courses offered at the school include GW-BASIC, Java (using the BlueJ IDE), and Logo. C++ is used as an optional course for the Plus Two students wishing to study computer science in college. The standard chemistry, physics, and biology courses are also offered as part of the science curriculum.

The arts and sciences offerings at the school include mathematics (covering geometry, algebra, and calculus), English, Hindi, Sanskrit; geography; environmental science; home economics, political science; commerce; economics, and history.

Moral science is taught in all classes, aimed at teaching the pupils about their duty to God, to fellow men, and to self.

As students move from 9th standard to 12th standard, they are allowed more freedom in choosing their own classes. They typically opt for a science or commerce-related curriculum to facilitate their entrance into college.

Many students struggle with the Indian Certificate of Secondary Education (I.C.S.E.) exams, so the National Institute of Open Schooling (NIOS) was introduced. This is a program that allows weaker students to prepare for their examination and, thus, increases their chances of success. Boys and girls of Jagadhri and other districts have registered for the examination through this school.

== Student life ==
=== Athletics ===
Track sports include 100 m, 200 m, 400 m, 800 m, 4 × 100 m relay, and 100 m hurdles. The field events include discus throw, javelin throw, and shot put. Most of the students take part in track and field, one of the most popular sports at the school.

The basketball teams have represented the city and the state at the District and National Level Tournaments. Football is practised for an hour each morning. handball is practised at the handball court of the adjacent J.R.D. Tata Sports Complex. The school has a Kho Kho (a tag sport) team. Volleyball, one of the athletic programs at the school, holds practices in the morning for an hour, in anticipation of the Annual Volleyball Tournament.

Karate in the Matsubayashi Shorin-ryu style is offered as one of the athletic programs by qualified senseis to promote skills in self-defence, as well as to increase the self-esteem and physical fitness of the girls at the school.

=== Clubs and music ===
- The Duke of Edinburgh's Award for young people, popularly known as a Dukes Club, developments students through outdoor activities and sports. Students attend camps under the guidance of instructors of the award scheme.
- The Eco-Commerce Club teaches students how to plan and organise events and finances, provides students with knowledge from experts in fields related to economics and commerce, making the students aware of the career options available within the country and abroad related to commerce, and to makes the students aware of the corporate world.
- The Environment Club instills in the students sense of environmental awareness and conservation. The club's motto is: "Say No To Plastic". Members study the environment and learn about the need to conserve nature. The school holds an annual inter-school environment fest called Equilibrium.
- Guides – Guiding is open to students who have been recruits for three to four months and have passed the requisite tests. The new guide goes through five stages to complete the Rashtrapati Guide Award and achieves the certificate from the President of India. They learn about knots, first aid, woodworking, hiking, cooking, and map-reading. They attend camps, meet girls from other schools, go hiking and trekking, participate in rallies, inter-school competitions, rafting, parasailing, and jamborees. They take part in the Republic Day and Independence Day marches, and help during the schools Annual Prize Night, Parents Day, and Annual Sports Day events.
- Jyoti Club (which stands for Jagadhri Youth Organization for Tomorrow's India) is open to students from the 9th to the 12th of every school in the city. The purpose of the Jyoti Unit in keeping with Carmelite philosophy is social service.
- Interact (International Action) Club was devised to promote social service. Members promote ecological awareness of their surroundings by running paper drives, planting trees, organising the School of Hope (an organisation that caters to mentally and physically challenged children), and participating in a two-day camp.
- The Maths and Science Club comprises members from the 9th to the 12th. The science club members participate in the annual science fest SPECTRA, which includes more than 40 events. The Maths and Science club, along with the SAFE club, organises an inter-school event called PULSE.
- The Safe Club was created to inculcate safety rules in the students. The members of the club organise helmet and license checking for the Plus Two students who use two wheelers. The club organises chart and collage competitions for the students of the Primary, and Safety Awareness talks for the students of the high school. Members of the club have taken part in inter-school competitions and have attended interactive sessions with the DC, SP, government and other administrative authorities from Tata.
- The School Band was formed in the late 1960s when Sister Veronique was the principal of the school. In 1989, the band received its first exposure to play for functions other than those held in the school, which brought wider recognition to the band.
- The Student Quality Circle is a group of students who meet for one hour per week to resolve student-related problems to improve the quality, productivity, and performance of the school.

=== Competitions ===
School contests include the nationwide quiz-style competitions; the QUANTA, a contest for science, mathematics, astronomy and computer science; the Fountainhead Essay Contest; the Cadbury Bournvita Quiz Contest; and essay and short story competitions for the Telegraph, the local newspaper, offered throughout the year. In 2005, Sacred Heart won Neuron, an inter-school quiz in biology.

== School uniform ==
The school uniforms in the colours of blue, white and maroon are worn at all times.

Girls

- Junior Class [I-IV] – Tunic in blue check, blue shirt, and white ribbon.
- Senior Class [V-XII] – Divided skirt in blue check, blue shirt, blue check jacket, and white ribbon.

Boys

- Junior Class [I-IV] – Blue shorts and shirt in blue checks.
- Senior Class [V-XII] – Blue pants and shirt in blue checks

Maroon and blue-striped tie, blue socks and black shoes for all.

== Principals ==
- Sister Annuciata (1966–1979)
- Sister Maret (1979–1984)
- Sister Majella (1984–1985)
- Sister Annuciata (1985–1988)
- Sister Zosima (1988–1998)
- Sister Kanthi (1998–2009)
- Sister Tesvin (2009–2016)
- Sister Jesina S.D (2016–Present)

== Alumni association ==
The Association of Sacred Heart Alumni (ASHA) was founded in 1995 by Sister Flavian. Among the activities and services provided to the community and school by ASHA are counselling to help students to receive guidance on careers and personal problems; inviting ex-students for career counselling and to share their own experiences; conducting the blood drives in aid of cancer patients; raising funds for the cancer hospital and the old age home; conducting spoken English classes for non-native speakers; operating a book store on the school premises; and volunteering at the Samaria Ashram (leper colony).

== See also ==
- Education in India
- Literacy in India
- List of institutions of higher education in Haryana
