= Debt Conciliation Board =

Government body in Haryana, India

Debt Conciliation Board, Government of Haryana
- कर्ज निपटान बोर्ड, हरियाणा सरकार

Agency overview
- Formed: 28 January 2007
- Jurisdiction: Government of Haryana
- Headquarters: Chandigarh
- Agency executive: Additional Deputy Commissioner, Chairman
- Website: revenueharyana.gov.in

The Debt Conciliation Board (DCB) is the independent organ of the Government of Haryana for the implementation of The Haryana Relief Of Agricultural Indebtness Act, 1989. It plays an important role in identifying the deserving candidates for providing relief and adequate benefits to them as per regulations.

== History ==
In 2007, Budget the central government passed the law of waiving agricultural loans to the tune of ₹60,000 crore, and to distribute this relief, the debt conciliation boards were set up by the Haryana government. The board was formed on 28 January 2007 by Chief Minister of Haryana BS Hooda. It was formed to provide relief from huge debts to the poor farmers and labourers of Haryana. First it was decided to constitute a single board for the state of Haryana. However, due to the presence of large population of benefitors, it was decided to constitute this board in every district of Haryana.

== Hierarchy ==
The board in each district is presided by Additional Deputy Commissioner. The District Revenue Officer and a representative of the financial institutions are the other official members. Furthermore, there are two non official Government representatives from each district of Haryana. Non Official Members are as follows:

Ambala

- Ram Pal Sharma
- Gulab Singh Ranga

Bhiwani

- Shish Ram Meechu
- Raj Kumar Sarsar

Faridabad

- Dr Harinder Pal Singh
- Hem Dagar

Fatehabad

- Darshan Singh
- Hanuman singh

Gurgaon

- Rao Sita Ram
- Jitender Bhardwaj

Hisar

- Rajpal Yadav
- Bir Singh Dalal

Jhajjar

- Balwant Singh
- Radhey Shyam Parik

Jind

- Rajbir Kataria
- Suraj Bhan Khatak

Kaithal

- Sudhir Mehta
- Sajjan Singh Dhull

Karnal

- Jaipal Mann
- Lalit Butana

Kurukshetra

- Lakhwinder Singh
- Man Singh

Mewat

- Raghubir Khokhiyaka
- Khurshid Ahmed

Mahendragarh

- Rajender Singh
- Rajinder Singh

Panchkula

- Naresh Mann
- Om Prakash Gujjar

Panipat

- Sadhu Ram
- Dr Pritam Singh Rawal

Rewari

- Harish Saini
- Ravinder Chander

Rohtak

- Ranbir Singh
- Raghubir Singh Magu

Sirsa

- Partap Khod
- Ranjeet Singh

Sonepat

- Jogender Singh Dahiya
- Jaipal Butana

Yamuna Nagar

- Naresh Kamboj
- Raj Kumar Khurdban

== Provisions in law ==
The boards have been constituted under the Haryana Relief of Agricultural Indebtedness Act. Though the Act was enacted in 1989, the boards have been constituted to make it highly effective. The boards have the jurisdiction to provide relief to debtors of not only a cooperative bank, cooperative society, nationalised bank or commercial bank, but also to the debtors of private creditors and money-lenders. Any debtor, who has paid more than double the principal amount, can approach the board. Section 3 (e) and 4 of the Act under which these boards were constituted provided rescheduling of the debts of farmers with regard to the repayment capacity of the debtor. Section 12 (5) provided that in case the debtor has repaid to the creditor an amount equal to or exceeding double the principal amount, or the debtor on being apprised of such findings pays an amount which makes total repayment equal to double the amount of principal, the board shall have the power to declare the debt as fully discharged.

== Criticism ==
DCB has been often criticised for being ineffective in providing relief to the deserving candidates in Haryana. It has been alleged that the main reason behind the unenthusiastic attitude of the government on this issue was that most political leaders had their own commission agent shops in various grain markets of the state and hence they acted as moneylenders to farmers.

== See also ==
- Debt bondage in India
