= R. K. Kamboj =

Indian pharmaceutical scientist

Dr R. K Kamboj (Rajender Kumar Kamboj) is an Indian Pharmaceutical scientist in the area of drug discovery. He was born in 1955 to Sh.Karta Ram Kamboj at Village Fatehpur, Yamunanagar district, Haryana.

== Education ==
He did his M.Sc. in Biological Sciences in 1977. He joined the University of Adelaide, Australia in 1981 and completed his Ph.D in March 1986. During his doctoral studies at the University of Adelaide (1981–1986), Kamboj published his researches in Plant Physiology. Kamboj's doctoral thesis was about Biochemical Studies on pollen and pollen-pistil interaction in `Petunia hybrida`.

== Career ==
After completing his Ph.D., Kamboj continued to work as research scientist in Australia till 1991. Thereafter, he moved to Canada to join Allelix Biopharmaceuticals Inc (a part of NPS Pharmaceuticals, Inc, Toronto), as its Vice President and Chief Scientific Officer. At Allelix, Kamboj was entrusted with the primary responsibility of managing its drug discovery programs. After working about 12 years with Allelix, Kamboj joined Xenon Genetics Inc, Vancouver as its vice president for Drug Discovery. In both the companies named above, Kamboj was instrumental in taking the companies from the inception of the drug discovery group all the way to multiple licensing transactions and collaborations.

Kamboj left Xenon Genetics Inc. in June 2008 to join Lupin Limited, a transnational pharmaceutical company from India, where he was appointed President of New Chemical Entity (NCE) Research of Lupin Limited. In the same year, Kamboj was also appointed president of the Novel Drug Discovery and Development of Lupin Limited.

Kamboj's experience includes contributions to business development, licensing products and technologies, mergers and acquisitions and corporate development activities. He holds over forty (40) U.S. patent applications (filed and issued), covering the discovery and use of a number of human genes. He is the author/co-author of over 90 research articles/papers in the field of biomedical field. His career spans more than 29 years in research, 16 years of which is in pharmaceutical industrial R&D setting.

Kamboj is currently a member of the working group on New TB Drugs Team, India.

Kamboj is also a member of the Market Advisory Groups (MAG) of the Asia Pacific Trade Council of British Columbia, Canada.
