= Chander Parkash Rahi =

Indian writer

Chander Parkash Rahi is a Punjabi writer who writes in English.

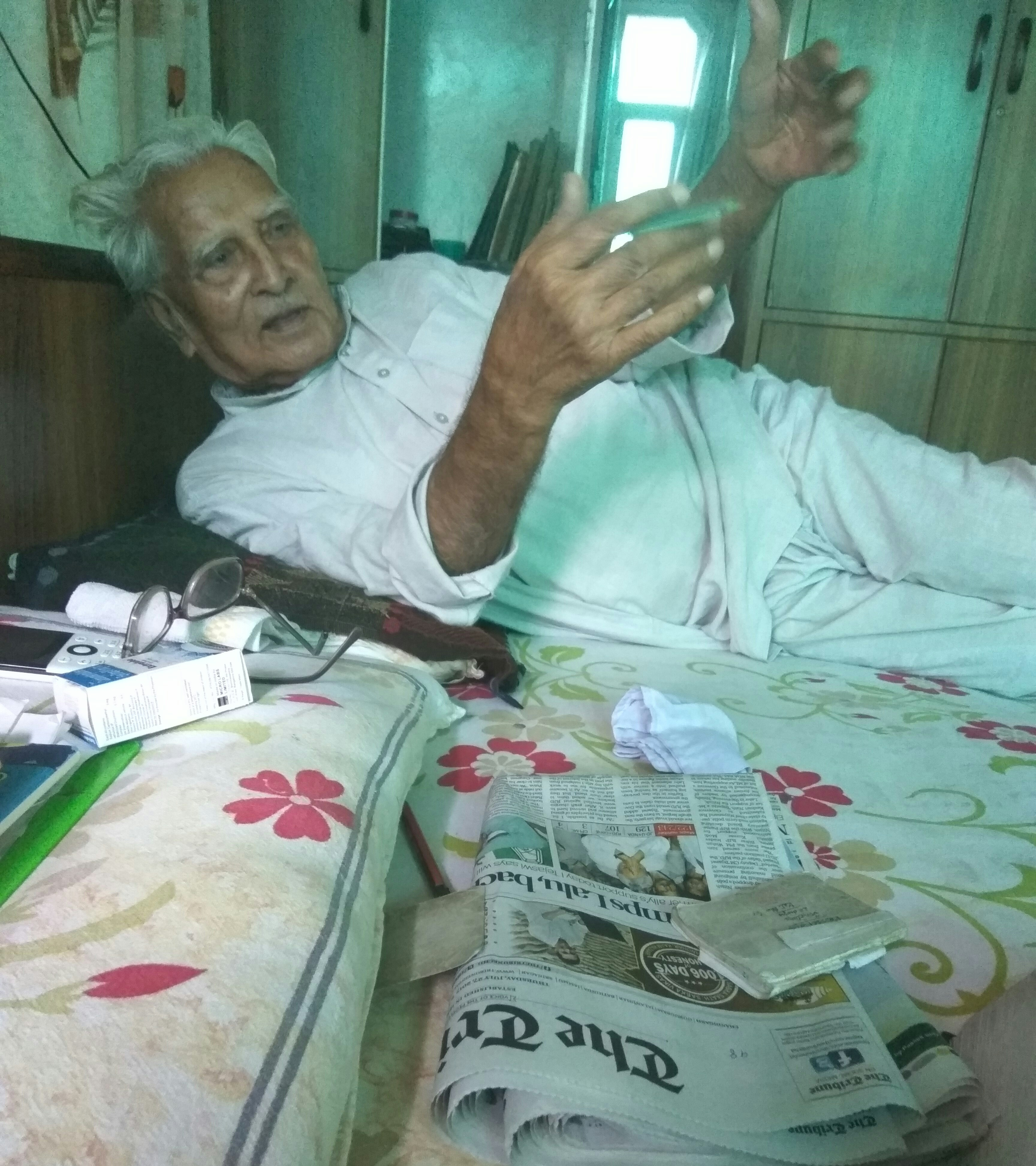
Chander Parkash Rahi

== Life ==
The native town of Chander Parkash Rahi is Khanna, Punjab, India. At the time of partition of India in 1947, he was 13 ½ years old. After completing his studies he became a school teacher and taught English for 35 years in rural, semi-urban, and urban areas. He later settled in Patiala.

== Books ==
- Wounds of Partition — The Mourning and Other Stories
- The Journey of A School Teacher
- Tenses and Grammatical Concepts in English
- Punjab's Turbulant Times
