= Haryana Environment Protection Council =

Advisory committee in India

- हरियाणा पर्यावरण संरक्षण परिषद

Agency overview
- Formed: 7 June 2006
- Jurisdiction: Government of Haryana
- Headquarters: Chandigarh
- Agency executive: Sh. Jagannath Pahadia Governor of Haryana, Chairman
- Website: harenvironment.gov.in

Haryana Environment Protection Council (HEPC) is an advisory committee formed in 2006 to advise the Ministry of Environment, Govt. of Haryana on environment issues. It is headquartered at Chandigarh. The committee was scheduled to be reconstituted in year 2011.

== Background ==
The demand for formation of Environment Council was raised when Hon'ble Supreme Court of India repeatedly expressed concerns over the degradation of environment in Haryana. Taking note of this, The Governor of Haryana, Sh. Jagannath Pahadia formed the Haryana Environment Protection Council on 7 June 2006 in Chandigarh and took over as the Chairman of the committee.

== Hierarchy ==
The Governor of Haryana is the official chairman of this committee. The Chief Minister of Haryana is the vice-chairman. The other official members are:

- Finance Minister,
- Irrigation Minister,
- Education Minister,
- Industries Minister,
- Public Health Minister,
- Environment Minister,
- Minister of State for Forest,
- Minister of State for Urban Development,

The Governor of Haryana has appointed 14 Non-official members of the committee:

- Dr. Shiv Shankar Bhardwaj
- Subhash Chaudhary
- Geeta Bhukal
- Vidya Bhushan Sharma
- Bhim Singh
- Naresh Kamboj
- Khurshid Ahmed
- Krishan Nanha
- Dalbir Singh Punia
- Ranjit Singh Mann
- Nirmal Dutt
- Vivekta Singh
- Hoshiari Lal Sharma
- Sudarshan Dua

== Functions ==
According to the Environment Ministry, HEPC works on three-point principle:

- Review the work relating to environment undertaken in the state by government and non-government organisations.
- Advise the state government of environmental issues of the state.
- Identify areas requiring investigation, research and restoration in the field of environment.

== Environmental issues ==
Areas of Haryana surrounding Delhi NCR are most polluted. During smog of November 2017, Air quality index of Gurugram and Faridabad showed that the density of Fine particulates (2.5 PM diameter) was an average of 400 PM and monthly average of Haryana was 60 PM. Other sources of pollution are exhaust gases from old vehicles, stone crushers and brick kiln. Haryana has 75 lakh (7,500,000) old vehicles, of which 40% are old more polluting vehicles, besides 500,000 new vehicles are added every year. Other majorly polluted cities are Bhiwani, Bahadurgarh, Dharuhera, Hisar and Yamunanagar.

Sahibi River tributary of Yamuna, specially its canalised portion in Delhi called Najafgarh drain, remain highly polluted with industrial chemicals, human waste and agriculture runoff.

Rejuvenation of Johads of Haryana, rivers and lakes of Haryana remains a big environmental issue.

== Achievements ==
On the advice of the council, the environment department has introduced three new schemes: Sewerage treatment plant in Haryana State, Ghaggar and Markanda Action Plan and setting-up of Environment Training Institute at Gurgaon in the 11th Five Year Plan (2007–12).The Finance and Planning Department gave its approval regarding the same and sanctioned a token amount during 2007–08.
