= Ashokan Edicts Archeological Park =

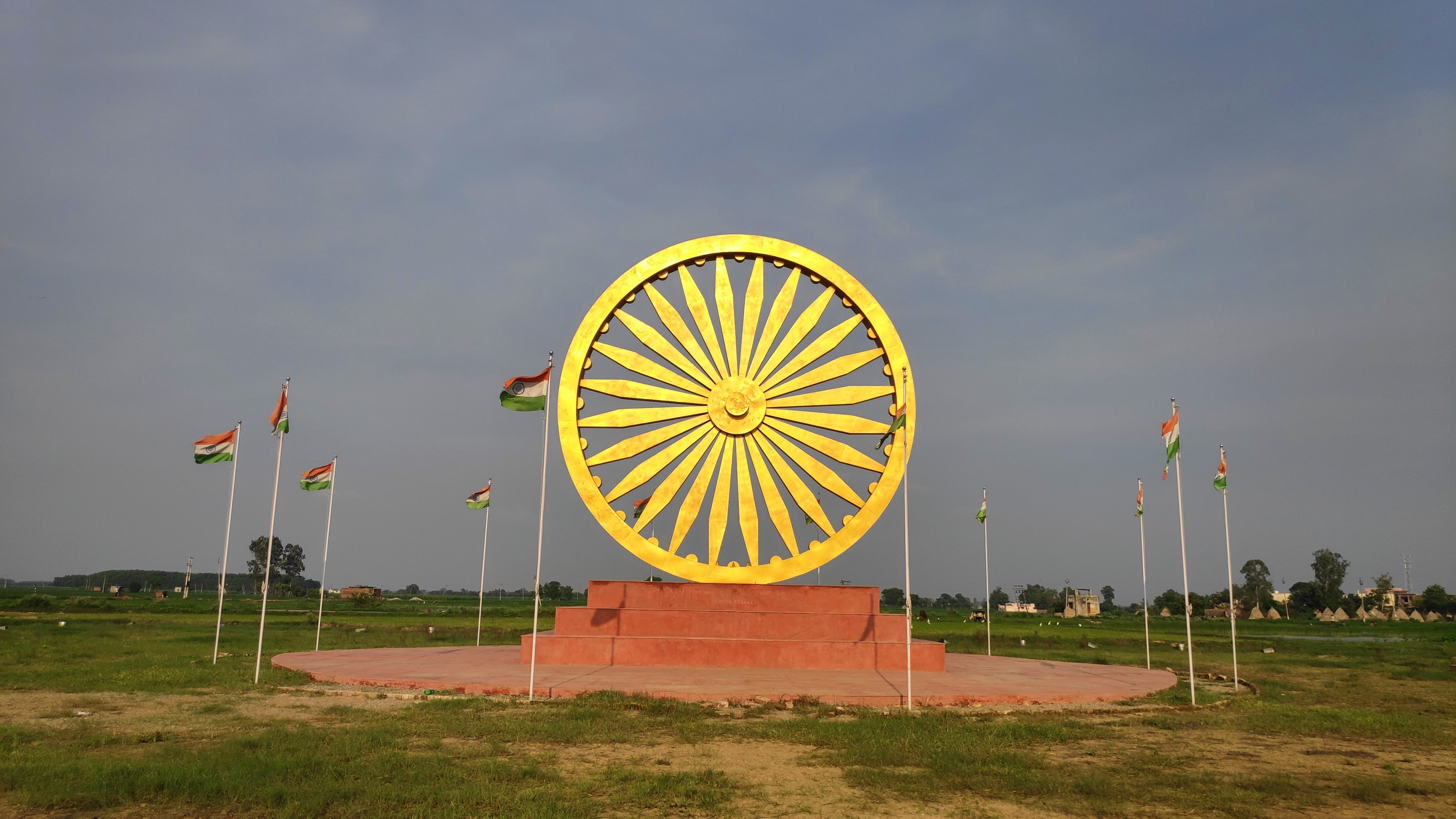
Ashok Satambh Park at topra kalan haryana

The Ashokan Edicts National Park/Ashoka Satambh Park, Topra Kalan in northern India, proposed in 2011 by Siddhartha Gauri and Dr. Satyadeep Neil Gauri, is devoted to the Buddhist teachings of Emperor Ashoka of the Maurya Empire. The park in the Haryana village of Topra displays replicas of Ashokan pillars and rock edicts. The park includes a sapling of the Jaya Sri Maha Bodhi tree from Sri Lanka.

== History ==
During the reign of Emperor Ashoka, several pillars were erected with deciphered texts. In this period, these pillars were scattered all over India. Today they are preserved by the Archaeological Survey of India. One such pillar composed of chukar rocks mined near Varanasi and bearing seven edicts in Brahmi script was erected in Topra. In the 14th century it was transported to Delhi via the Yamuna River. British archaeologist James Prinsep decoded and translated its edicts in 1837. In 2018, a replica of the pillar was made and placed in Topra Ashokan Edicts Archeological Park and Museum.

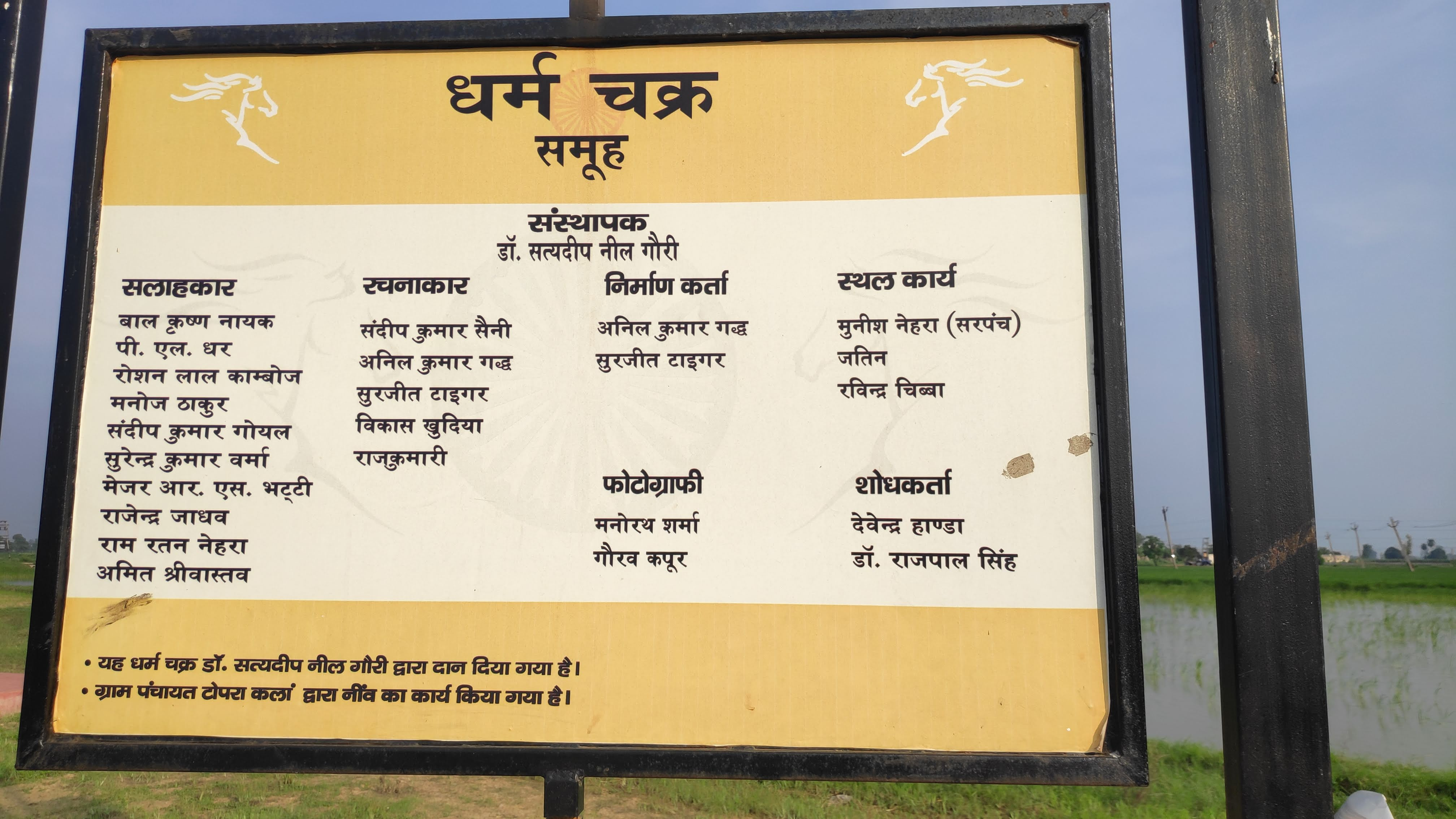
Dharam Chakra board Ashok Satambh Park at topra kalan

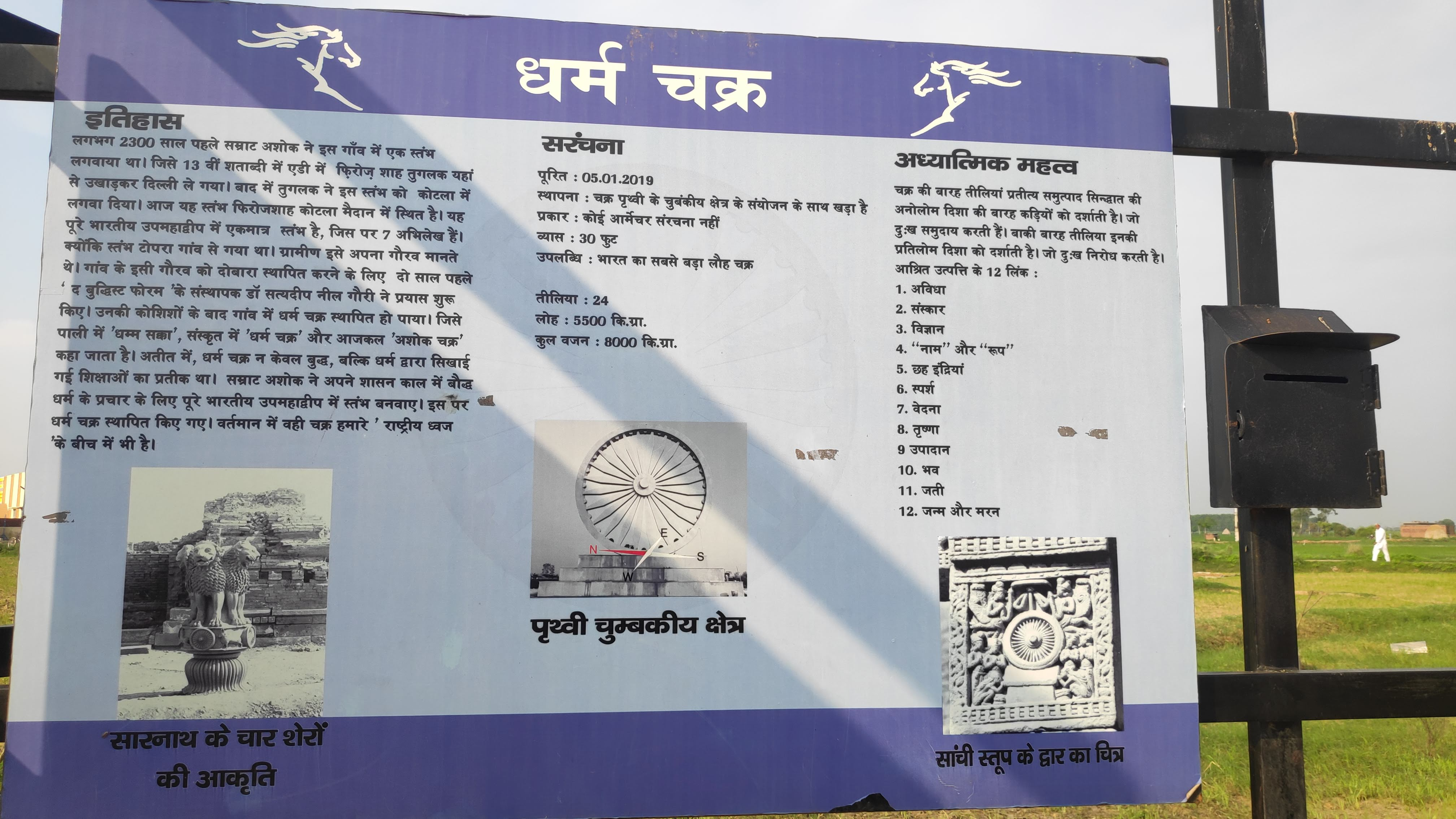
Dharam chakra description of Ashok Satambh Park at topra kalan

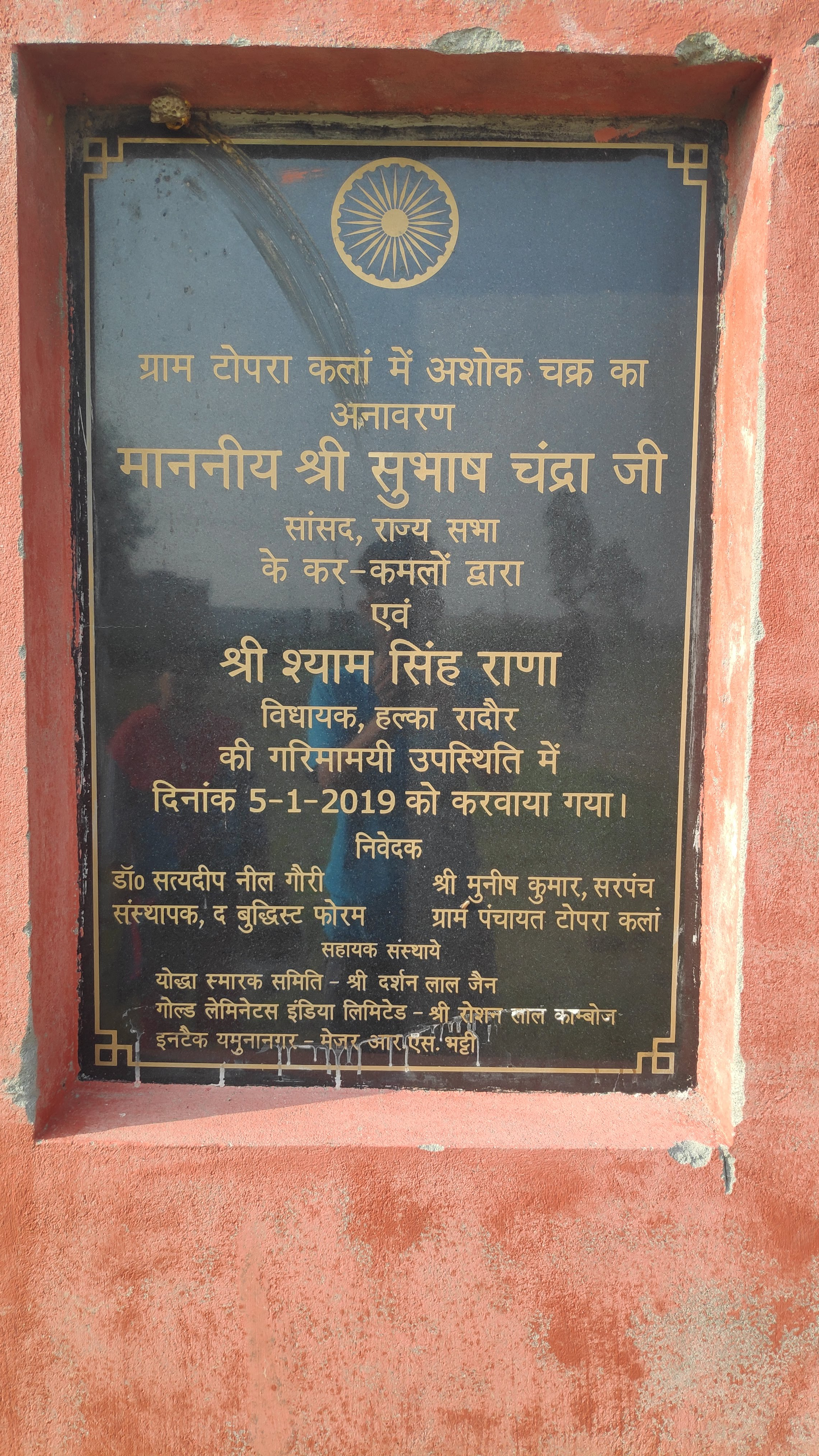
Fountain stone in Ashok Satambh Park at topra kalan

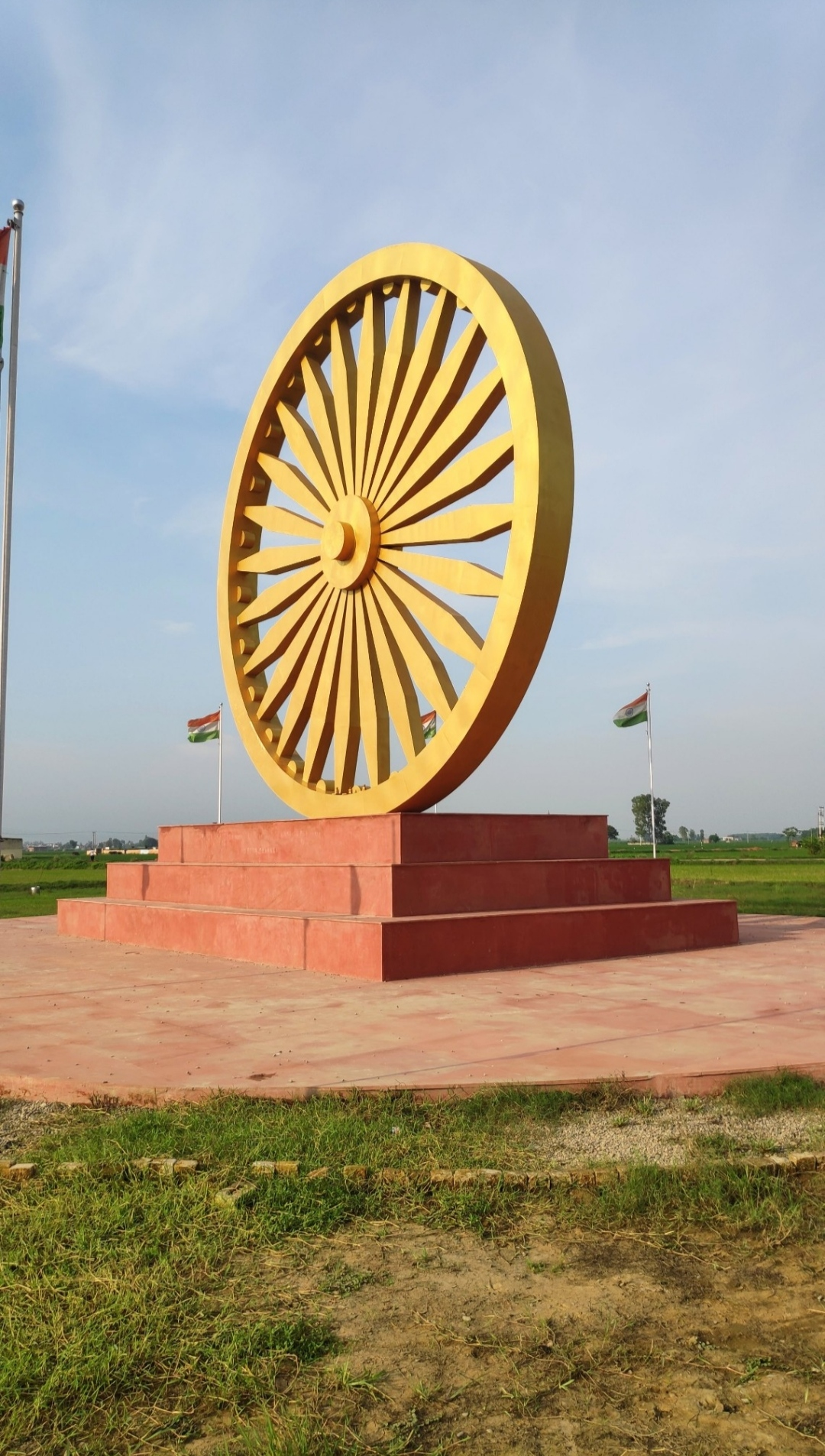
Ashoka chakra at Ashok Satambh Park at topra kalan

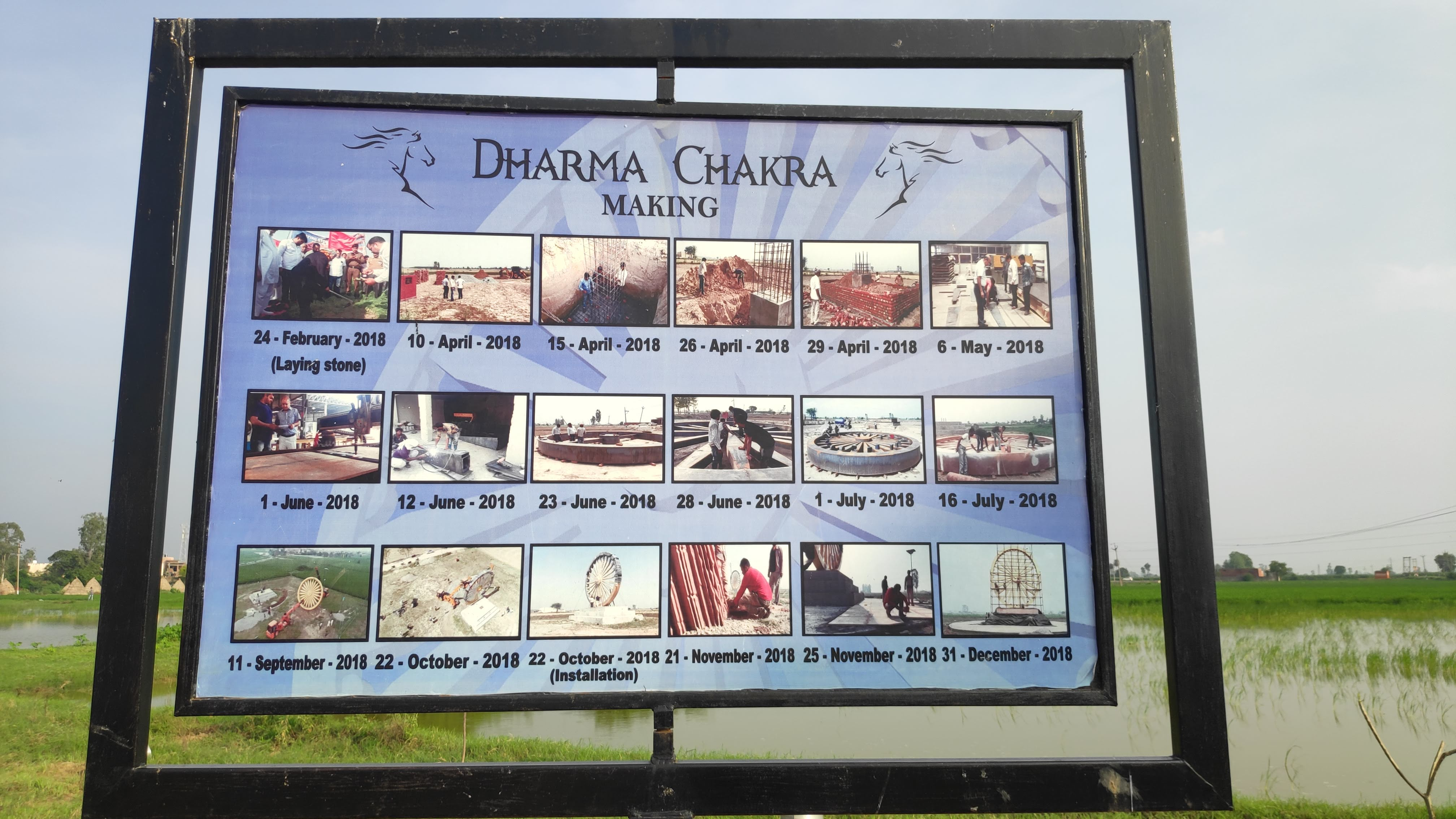
Process explaining making of Ashok Satambh Park at topra kalan

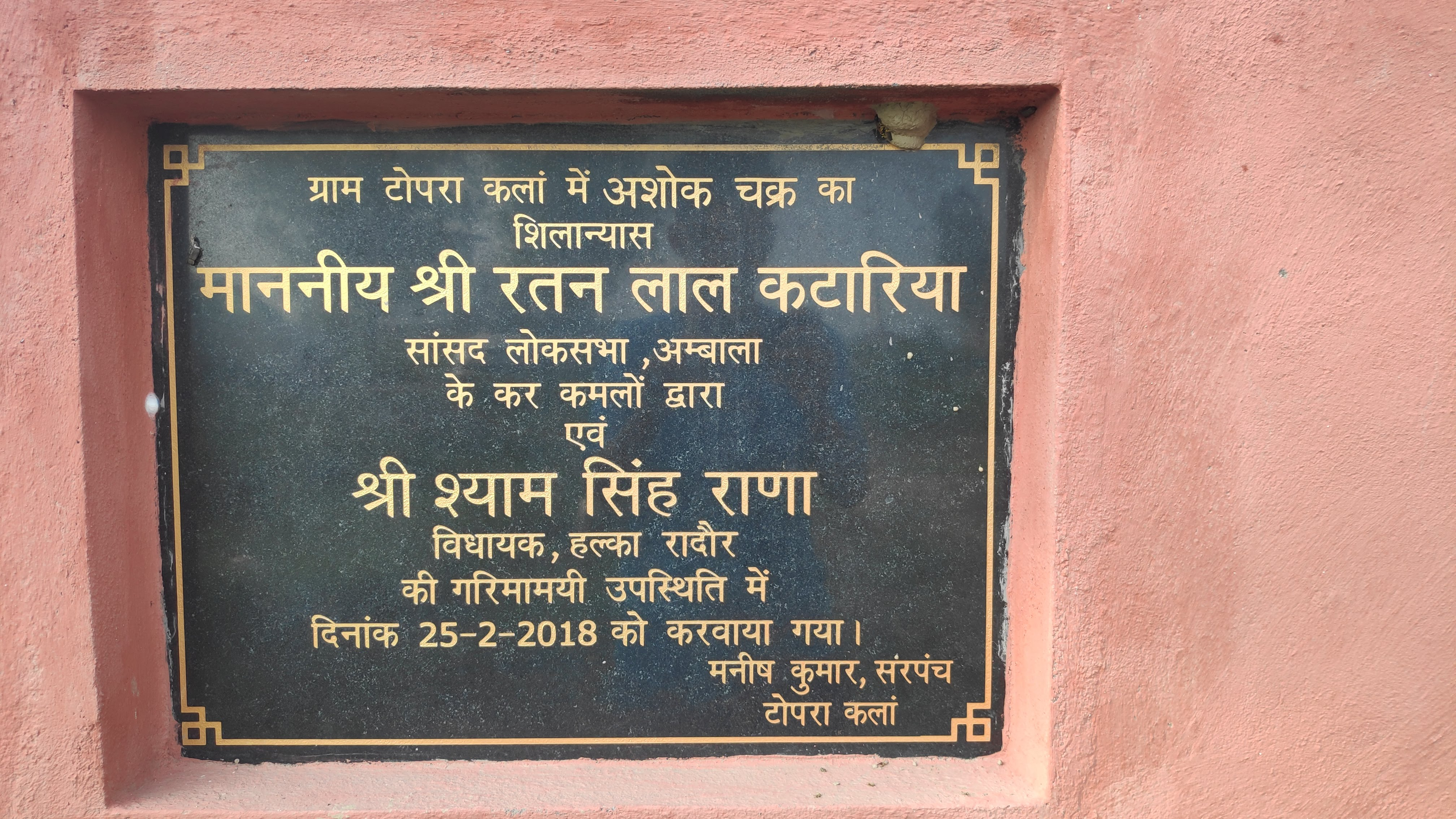
Initial stone assembly board atAshok Satambh Park at topra kalan

== Grants ==
The park owes its origins to the gift of 28 acres of land by the village panchayat of Topra Kalyan and an April 2015 commitment by the then-Chief Minister of Haryana, Manohar Lal Khattar, to provide 500 million Indian rupees (US$7.1 million) for construction of the park.

== The Park ==
The park includes the replicas of Ashoka Pillar from Delhi, Replica of Babur Caves from Gaya Bihar, and an Ashoka statue from Odisha.
