= S.D. Public School, Jagadhri =

Location
- Jagadhri, Haryana; India; 30°19′18.75″N 78°3′28.99″E

Information
- Motto: Tamaso ma jyotirgamay (Leading from unreal to real)
- Established: 1950
- Founder: Shri Sanatan Dharam Sabha
- Chairman: Nand Lal Garg
- Principal: Usha Sharma
- Faculty: 45
- Enrollment: 1500
- Language: English
- Houses: Gandhi, Shivaji, Nehru & Tagore
- Colors: Green, yellow, red and blue
- Slogan: Eat Well, Sleep Well, Work Hard, Play Hard and Above All, Be a Gentleman!
- Nickname: SDians
- Affiliation: CBSE
- Alumni: Saksham Madaan
- Website: sdpsjagadhri.com

S.D. Public School is an English medium school located in Jagadhri, India offering instruction from Nursery level through the 12th grade. It was founded in 1979 as a Hindi medium school. It was the 1st private school in Jagadhri.

The campus is in the town of Jagadhri near Yamuna Nagar, with 1500 students and five buildings.

The school is secular and admits boys and girls from all parts of the world representing all religions, castes and creeds. It provides no religious instruction, but secular prayers and congregational singing of secular and patriotic hymns are a part of the daily morning assembly.

== History ==
=== The Founding ===
S.D. Public School was founded in 1979, by a Philanthropic society Shri Sanatan Dharam Sabha, jagadhri. It was the 1st English medium school in Jagadhri.

The seeds of this institute were sown in 1979 to cater to the educational needs of the children of Jagadhri An English medium School, under the aegis of Shri Sanatan Dharam Sabha, Jagadhri was the coveted desire of the residents of jagadhri. The society came up with an English medium School. Then in 1988, S.D. Public School affiliated to C.B.S.E., New Delhi, came into its existence.

The motto of the school is "तमसो मा ज्योतिर्गमय". Translated from Sanskrit it means leading from unreal to real.
