= Jhatka Parkash =

1966 book by Giani Narinjan Singh Saral

Jhatka Prakash
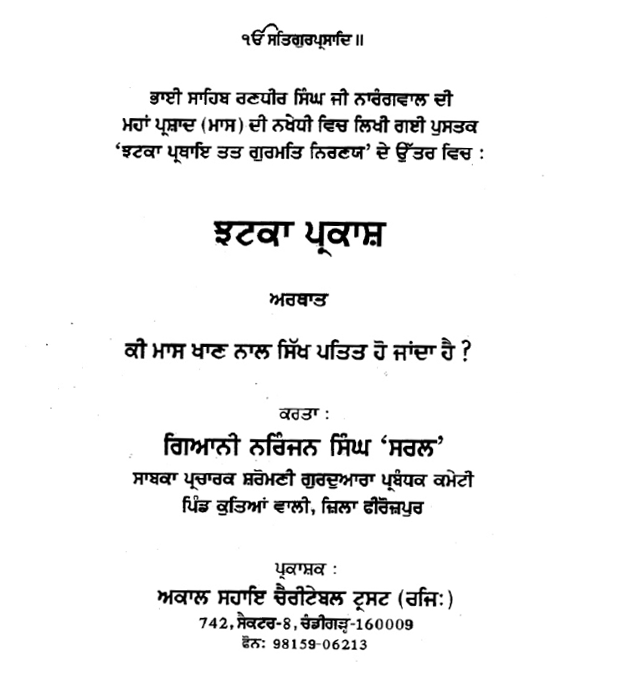
- Author: Giani Narinjan Singh Saral
- Language: Punjabi
- Subject: Diet and Sikhism
- Genre: Religious literature
- Published: 1966 (SGPC, 1st edition); 2008 (Akal Sahaye Charitable Trust(Reg.), 2nd edition)
- Publication place: Punjab, India

Jhatka Parkash (Punjabi: ਝਟਕਾ ਪ੍ਰਕਾਸ਼), also called Jhatka Parkash Granth, is a book written by Giani Niranjan Singh Saral, a leading preacher of the SGPC, concerning historical, philosophical, etymological and theological aspects of Jhatka and Meat eating in Sikh Religion.

This text was written in response to Randhir Singh's writing Jhatke Prithaye Tat Gurmat Nirney, which harshly demotes Jhatka practice in Sikhs. Niranjan Singh addresses the root of every question and doubt raised against Jhatka and answered accordingly. The book was published in 1966 and was republished in 2008.

== Content ==
Following are various topics covered in this text:

1. Word Jhatka in Gurbani!
2. The deceit written about word Kuttha!
3. How Kuttha word became popular?
4. Jhatka and Hindu.
5. Mahaparshad and Kada Parshaad.
6. Who will decide?
7. Does Meat increase sex and produce all vices?
8. The Philosophy of Jeev Daya!
9. Is Meat not food of Human?
10. Does Meat effects Human Teeth?
11. Meat of all type!
12. Is meat food of Muslims?
13. Does meat effects human intellect?
14. Benefits of Parishushak Meat
15. Sikh History and Meat
16. Witness of Non Sikh writers about Meat eating Singhs
17. The real motive behind Hunting!
18. Was Jhatka done on goat or human?
19. Give life to dead
20. Meat and Bhai Gurdas
21. Shalokas of Malhar Ki Vaar
22. Meat and Kabir Vani
23. More hymns on Jeev Daya
24. What is Hari Rang and how to attain that?
25. Attacks on Nihang Singhs!
26. Akali Kaur Singh Nihang was called Murderer!
27. Who is actual murderer of Bhai Narinder Singh?
28. More thoughts on discussion with Akali Kaur Singh.
29. Was Bhai Randhir Singh sweet speaker?
30. I was threaten!
31. A small objection
32. Bibliography
33. The Last Poem

== Reception and Controversy ==
The book was criticized by Bhai Randhir Singh followers known as Akhand Kirtani Jatha. As per Niranjan Singh, he was threaten by Jatha members and also efforts were taken to remove this book from all libraries and book shops limiting its existence.

Kehar Singh Nihang, Budha Dal appreciated Saral for his work. He wished this book to reach among Sikhs so that they could clarify difference between Jhatka and Kutha and know about historicity of Jhatka and Meat in Sikh religion.

== See also ==
- Jhatka
- Diet in Sikhism
- Halal
