= JMIT =

Engineering college in Radaur, Haryana, India

Coordinates: 30.0367584°N 77.1601796°E

Seth Jai Parkash Mukand Lal Institute of Engineering and Technology (JMIT)
- Motto: Excellence Through Innovation and Creativity
- Type: Private
- Established: 1995
- Affiliations: Kurukshetra University, Kurukshetra
- Faculty: 175+
- Undergraduates: 2500
- Postgraduates: 400
- Location: Radaur, Haryana, India
- Campus: Fully residential
- Nicknames: JMIT Radaur, SJPMLIET, SPJMIT
- Website: www.jmit.ac.in

Seth Jai Parkash Mukand Lal Institute of Engineering and Technology (informally JMIT Radaur or simply JMIT) is a private college of Engineering in Radaur, Haryana, India. It was established in 1995 as a member of the group Seth Ved Parkash Mukand Lal Educational society. JMIT is affiliated with Kurukshetra University, in Kurukshetra. It is accredited by the All India Council for Technical Education, a division of the state Ministry of Human Resource Development. It was also accredited by NBA.

== Programs ==
JMIT offers Five degree programs:

- Four-year undergraduate Bachelor of Technology degrees in
  - Electronics and Communication Engineering
  - Computer Science and Engineering
  - Information Technology
  - Mechanical Engineering
  - Electrical Engineering
- Two-year postgraduate Master of Technology degrees in
  - Computer Engineering
  - Electronics and Communication Engineering.
  - Artificial Technology and Machine Learning.
    - Manufacturing Technology(Mechanical)
- Two-year postgraduate Master of Business Administration (MBA) degree.
- Three-year postgraduate Master of Computer Applications (MCA) degree.
- Three-year graduate Bachelor of Computer Applications(BCA) degree.
- Three-year graduate Bachelor of Business Administration(BBA) degree.

== Admissions ==
=== B.Tech ===
Students seeking admissions to B.Tech. courses appear for the JEE MAIN exam conducted by CBSE every year in April. Students who qualify this exam exercise their choices at the centralised online state counselling conducted by HSCS(Haryana State Counseling Society) in June. Admission into the first year for the 75% seats of the B.Tech. program can only be obtained through this route. Rest 25% seats are filled up at the institute level purely on the basis of merit in AIEEE.

Students who have a three-year diploma from a recognised polytechnic in the state can directly get admission to the second year of the B.Tech. program through the LEET Exam. LEET is an online exam organised by the HSCS, usually held in June. Only a limited number of seats are filled through this route.

=== M.Tech ===
Admissions to the M.Tech. course is given to candidates who qualify in GATE with bachelor's degree in respective branch of engineering or technology from any Indian university included in the approved list of AIU (Association of Indian universities) securing at least 60% marks in aggregate.

=== MCA ===
Students seeking admission to the three year MCA course appear for an entrance exam OLET-MCA-2010 conducted by Haryana State Counseling Society. The qualified students of this exam exercise their choices at the online state centralised counselling organised by HSCS. Students are required to have a bachelor's degree in any discipline with 50% marks with mathematics as compulsory subject at 10+2 level or Graduation level or B.Com/BCA or any other equivalent examination recognised by the university.

=== MBA ===
Students seeking admission to the two year MBA course are required to have minimum 50% marks in Bachelor's or postgraduate Degree in any discipline from a recognised university or an examination recognised as equivalent there to and have to appear for admission test 'MAT' conducted by AIMA or 'CAT' conducted by IIMs.

== Training and Placement ==
The Training and Placement department helps JMIT graduates get jobs.

== Recognition ==
=== Accreditation ===
- JMIT has been ISO certified ISO 9001-2001 and runs on No Profit - No Loss basis.
