= Mukand Lal National College =

College in Haryana, India

Mukand Lal National College (MLNC)
- Other names: MLN College, MLN Yamuna Nagar
- Type: Private
- Established: 1955
- Academic affiliations: Kurukshetra University, Kurukshetra
- Principal: Rahul Khanna
- Academic staff: 70+
- Undergraduates: 1600
- Postgraduates: 600
- Location: Yamunanagar, Haryana, India; 30.1339°N 77.2888°E
- Website: mlncollegeynr.ac.in

Mukand Lal National College (informally MLN College or simply MLN Yamunanagar) is a government aided private college of Science and Commerce in Yamunanagar in the Indian state of Haryana.

Mukand Lal National College was established in 1955 by a great visionary and educationist Seth Jai Prakash in the cherished memory of his illustrious father Seth Mukand Lal Ji, who was a renowned Gandhian and philanthropist. It was established for providing graduate level education to the youth of Yamuna Nagar. The current chairman is Ashok Kumar.

MLN College is affiliated with Kurukshetra University, in Kurukshetra. The college has been declared as College with Potential for Excellence (CPE) by the University Grants Commission of India, New Delhi. It is the only college in Haryana to be awarded the distinguished position. It is also accredited by Tata Consultancy Services (TCS).

== History ==
M.L.N. College was founded in 1955 by Seth Jai Prakash in Memory of his Father Seth Mukand Lal Ji. Seth Mukand Lal Ji was a close adherent of Gandhi Ji and was sports_nicknamed "Pagla Bhagat" by him. Illiterate himself, he vowed to dispel the darkness of ignorance by opening educational institutions starting with setting up of Mukand Lal National High School at Abdulapur (now Yamuna Nagar).

Seth Jai Prakash, his illustrious son accelerated the pace of opening institutions in the name of his father. A selfless man, he motivated the rich, particularly the business community by saying, "Rain Water that accumulates on the roof top without an outlet, shall bring down the roof. Likewise, wealth without charity will ruin the household of the wealthy". He acted on his principle till the last and contributed large sums of money to educational institutions.

Today Mukand Lal National College, Yamuna Nagar is a part of a chain of institutions being run under the banner of Seth Jai Prakash Mukand Lal Institutions of Knowledge and service. The chain has a total of 30 institutions which include schools, colleges, polytechnics, engineering college, MBA/MCA institutes and hospitals which are serving the society in the fields of education and healthcare for the last about sixty years i.e. since 1946.

It has been granted the status of ‘College with Potential for Excellence’ by the University Grants Commission (UGC) for 2010 to 2012, one of the five colleges to be received the status, in the state of Haryana.

== Campus ==
MLN Campus is located in Model Town, Yamuna Nagar. It is built in approximately 20,000 m^{2} consisting of all the modern facilities required. It is located in the heart of the city. It is located 180 km (110 mi) from Delhi and 120 km (75 mi) from Chandigarh. It is one of the oldest institutes of Haryana.

The college was started in the Administrative block near the principal's office, and over time additions have been made to the structure with careful planning to arrive at the today's layout. A lot of attention has been given to the detail to make it comfortable for the students. The new Cafeteria was built in 2007 adjacent to the volleyball court. It has underground parking and hall on the second floor which is used for

== Programs ==
M.L.N. College has 25 departments for various subjects. MLN College offers following unaided degree programs:

- Three-year undergraduate Bachelor of Science degrees in
  - Computer Science,
  - Biochemistry,
  - Computer Applications,
  - Bio Technology,
  - Bio Informatics,
  - Information Technology (Hons.)
  - Industrial Microbiology.
- Two-year postgraduate Master of Science degrees in
  - Applied Physics
  - Computer Science
- Two-year postgraduate Master of Commerce degree.
- Three Year undergraduate Bachelor of Arts degree in
  - Fine Arts
  - Computer Science
- Three year undergraduate Bachelor of Commerce degree in
  - Computer Applications
  - Tourism and Travel Management
  - Tax Procedures and Practices
- Three year undergraduate Bachelor of Computer Applications degree.
- Three year undergraduate Bachelor of Business Administration degree.
- Other Courses
  - Certificate in Physical Education (Two Years)
  - Bachelor of Physical Education (One Year)
  - Master of Physical Education (Two Years)

Following are the government-aided degree programs at MLN:

- Three-year undergraduate degree programs in
  - BSc with Physics, Chemistry, Mathematics, Electronics and Statistics
  - BSc Zoology, Botany and Chemistry
  - B.Com. General
  - B.A. with English, Hindi, Political Science, Economics, History, Statistics, Mathematics, Rural Industrialization, Music (Vocal), Physical Education, Sanskrit, Punjabi.
  - B.A. (Hons.) with English, Political Science and Economics
- Two-year postgraduation programs in
  - MSc with Chemistry
  - M.A. with Economics, English and Political Science
- Postgraduate diploma courses in
  - D.S.P. (Diploma in Secretarial Practice)

== Extracurricular activities ==
=== Games and sports ===
M.L.N. College has well-built infrastructure for the various sports and has a reputation for producing good athletes who have participated at national and international level for various teams.

M.L.N. College has various fields built inside the campus for students to practice, which include:

- Multipurpose football field, which is also used for cricket and athletic competitions.
- Hockey field
- Table Tennis
- Tennis court
- Badminton court
- Volleyball court
- Basketball court
- Gymnasium for gymnastics and weightlifting and other indoor games
- Running track

=== Blood donation initiative ===
Every year, a blood donation camp is organised by M.L.N. College. The blood donation driver was started by then principal Lt. Mr Tilak Raj Chadha on 5 September 1972, and since then has been organised every year. Till date more than 11,000 units of blood has been donated through the camp. In year 2009 alone 383 units of blood were collected which will be used by various hospitals.:

== Admissions ==
Admissions to all the degree programs are done in the months of June–July every year. Admissions to all the aided and non-aided courses are done at the institute level through counseling.

== Training and Placement ==
The Training and Placement department helps M.L.N. College graduates get jobs. M.L.N. College is accredited by Tata Consultancy Services. MLN College graduates have gone on to work in several large corporations, including Wipro, TCS, Jamna Auto Industries, ISGEC, and BILT. TCS is a regular at MLN College because of its MoU with Mukand Lal Institutions.

== Alumni ==
Saksham Madaan
