= Jagadhri =

- City
- Haryanvi language
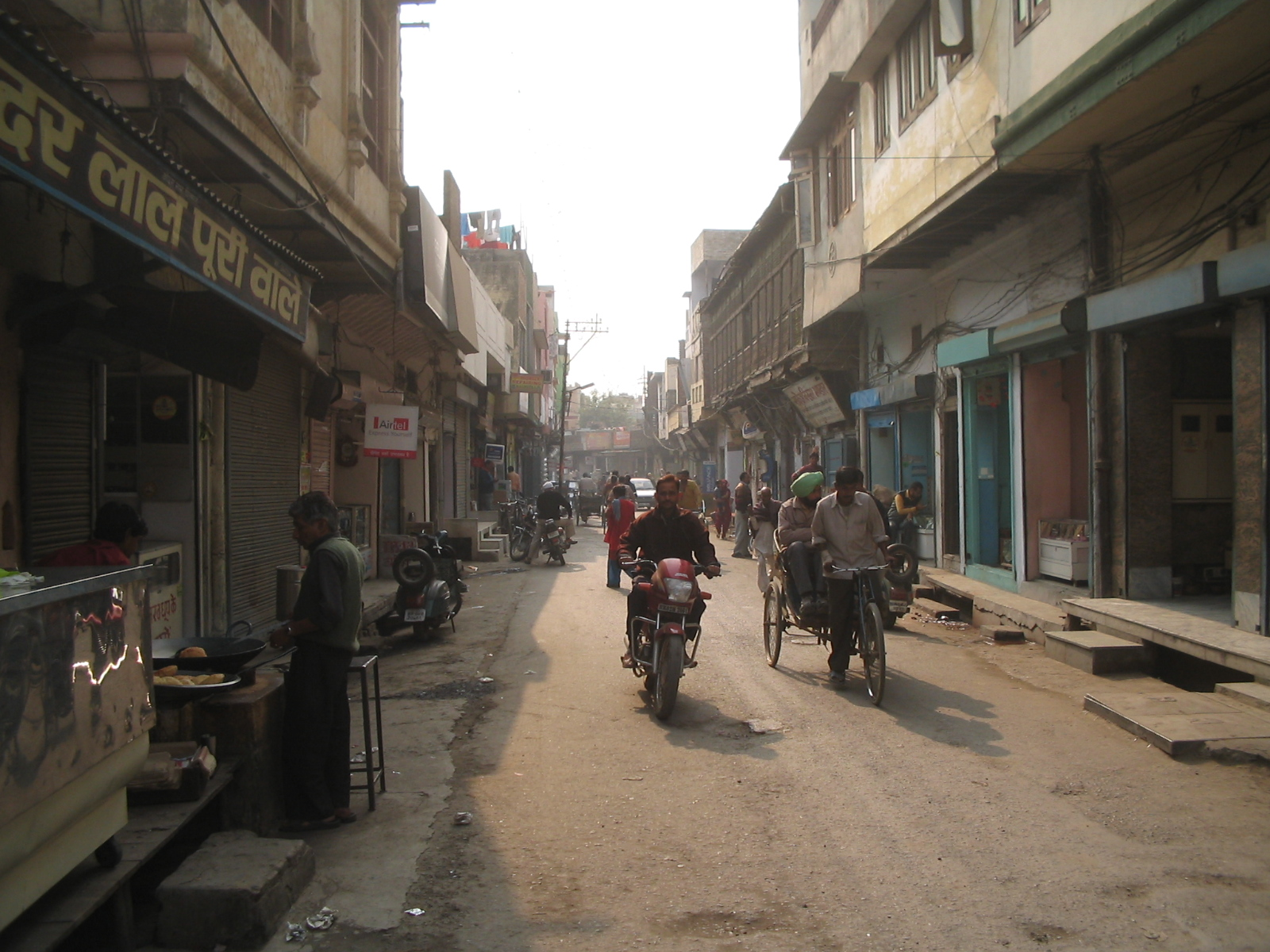
- An old market road of Jagadhri in Yamunanagar (Haryana)

- Location in Haryana, India Jagadhri (India)
- Coordinates: 30.168°N 77.301°E
- Country: India
- State: Haryana
- District: Yamunanagar
- Established: 20 june

Government
  - Type: Municipal Corporation
  - Body: Yamunanagar Municipal Corporation
- Elevation: 281 m (922 ft)

Population (2001)
  - Total: 124,894

Languages
  - Official: Hindi, Regional Haryanvi
- Time zone: UTC+5:30 (IST)
- PIN: 135003
- Telephone code: 1732
- ISO 3166 code: IN-HR
- Vehicle registration: HR-02
- Website: haryana.gov.in

Jagadhri is a city and a municipal council in the Yamunanagar district of the Indian state of Haryana. The town is adjacent to the city of Yamunanagar.

== Etymology ==
Jagadhri may be named after Yugandhari, legendary king of the Yugandharas.

== Demographics ==
As of 2011 Indian Census, Jagadhri had 26,716 households with a total population of 124,894 of which 67,685 were male and 57,209 were females. Population within the age group of 0 to 6 years was 14,011. The total number of literates in Jagadhri was 94,468, which constituted 75.6% of the population with male literacy of 78.3% and female literacy of 72.5%. The effective literacy rate of 7+ population of Jagadhri was 85.2%, of which male literacy rate was 88.3% and female literacy rate was 81.5%. The Scheduled Castes population was 15,460.

== Education ==
Local schools include:

- Maharaja Agrasen College, Jagadhri
- Maharaja Agrasen Institute of Management and Technology
- Mukand Lal National College
- S.D. Public School, Jagadhri
- St. Thomas school, Jagadhri
- St. Lawerence International School
- Sacred Heart School, Jagadhri
