= Yamunanagar district =

Coordinates: 30°07′12″N 77°16′48″E

- District of Haryana
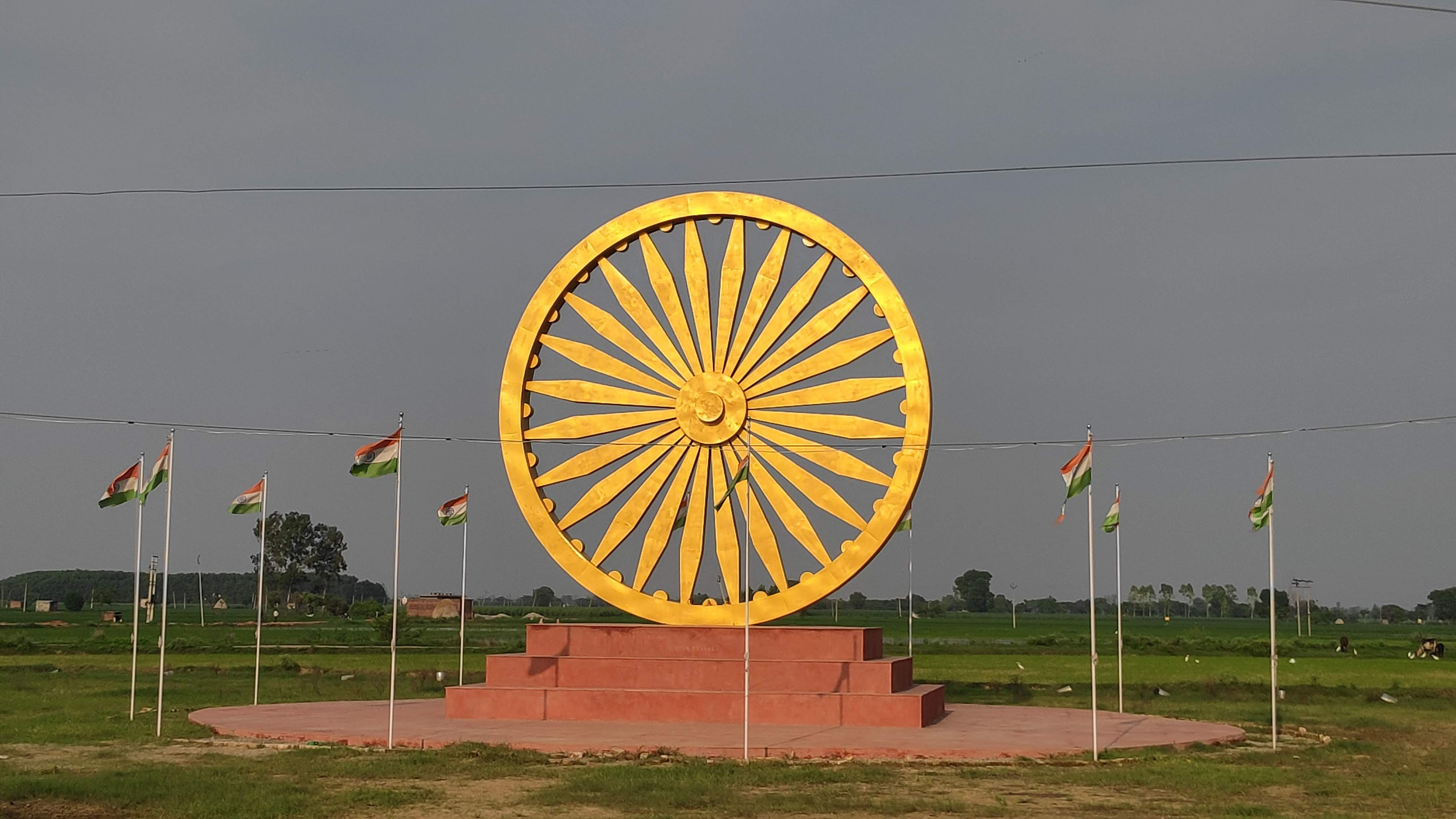
- Ashok Stambh Park at Topra Kalan

- Location in Haryana
- Country: India
- State: Haryana
- Headquarters: Yamunanagar
- Tehsils: Jagadhri, Chhachhrauli, Bilaspur

Government
  - Lok Sabha constituencies: Ambala (shared with Ambala district), Kurukshetra (shared with Kurukshetra district)

Area
  - Total: 1,756 km^{2} (678 sq mi)

Population (2011)
  - Total: 1,214,205
  - Density: 691.5/km^{2} (1,791/sq mi)

Demographics
  - Sex ratio: 862

Languages
  - Official: Hindi
  - Regional: Haryanvi; Sirmauri; Khariboli
- Time zone: UTC+05:30 (IST)
- Website: yamunanagar.nic.in

Yamunanagar district is one of the 23 districts of the Indian state of Haryana. The district came into existence on 1 November 1989 and occupies an area of 1,756 square kilometres (678 mi^{2}). Yamunanagar town is the district headquarters.

Yamunanagar's average rainfall in Monsoon is 892 mm, which is much higher than the state average of 462 mm.

The district is bounded by Himachal Pradesh state in the north, by Uttar Pradesh state in the east, by Karnal district in the south, by Kurukshetra district in the southwest and Ambala district in the west. The capital of First Sikh Empire of Baba Banda Singh Bahudur in Lohgarh Fort and his first victories in towns of Sadhaura and Mustafabad are located in this District. Yamunanagar district's Kalesar, which is a hilly part of the district, is bordered with Sirmaur district of Himachal Pradesh, also home to Kalesar National Park is part of the Mahasu region culturally.

== Divisions ==
The district is divided into 3 sub divisions: Jagadhri, Radaur and Bilaspur. There are 4 tehsils: Jagadhri, Chhachhrauli, Radaur and Bilaspur. These are further divided into 7 development blocks: Bilaspur, Sadhaura, Radaur, Jagadhri, Chhachhrauli, Saraswati Nagar and Partap Nagar. There are 4 Vidhan Sabha constituencies in the district: Sadhaura, Jagadhri, Yamuna Nagar and Radaur. While Sadhaura, Jagadhri and Yamuna Nagar are part of Ambala Lok Sabha constituency, Radaur is part of Kurukshetra Lok Sabha constituency.

== Demographics ==
Historical population
Year	Pop.	±% p.a.
1901	234,603	—
1911	198,649	−1.65%
1921	214,427	+0.77%
1931	213,007	−0.07%
1941	243,803	+1.36%
1951	262,906	+0.76%
1961	370,224	+3.48%
1971	478,483	+2.60%
1981	632,820	+2.84%
1991	806,279	+2.45%
2001	1,041,630	+2.59%
2011	1,214,205	+1.54%

Religion in Yamunangar district (2011)
Religion	Percent
Hinduism	81.12%
Islam	11.41%
Sikhism	6.96%
Other or not stated	0.51%

According to the 2011 census Yamunanagar district has a population of 1,214,205, roughly equal to the nation of Bahrain or the US state of New Hampshire. This gives it a ranking of 393rd in India (out of a total of 640). The district has a population density of 687 inhabitants per square kilometre (1,780/sq mi). Its population growth rate over the decade 2001–2011 was 16.56%. Yamuna Nagar has a sex ratio of 877 females for every 1,000 males, and a literacy rate of 78.9%. 38.94% of the population lives in urban areas. Scheduled Castes make up 25.26% of the population.

=== Languages ===
Languages of Yamunanagar district (2011)
1. Hindi (88.3%)
2. Punjabi (7.24%)
3. Haryanvi (1.75%)
4. Urdu (1.20%)
5. Others (1.53%)

At the time of the 2011 Census of India, 88.28% of the population in the district spoke Hindi, 7.24% Punjabi, 1.75% Haryanvi and 1.20% Urdu as their first language.

== Major cities, towns, and villages ==
- Bilaspur
- Chhachhrauli
- Jagadhri, located adjacent to Yamunanagar, is older of the twin cities.
- Mandkheri
- Munda Majra
- Radaur
- Yamunanagar, a municipal corporation and district headquarters of Yamunanagar

== Geography and Climate ==
Yamunanagar district is situated on north-eastern tip of Haryana. It is bounded by Himachal Pradesh on northern side and Uttar Pradesh on eastern side. Land is plain with Siwalik hills on northern side, some high cliffs can also be found on northern side.

Month Rainfall (mm) January 28.0 February 28.1 March 22.5 April 21.7 May 38.9 June 128.0 July 372.0 August 343.7 September 150.9 October 19.0 November 12.5 December 17.8
