= Yamunanagar =

City in Haryana, India

- City
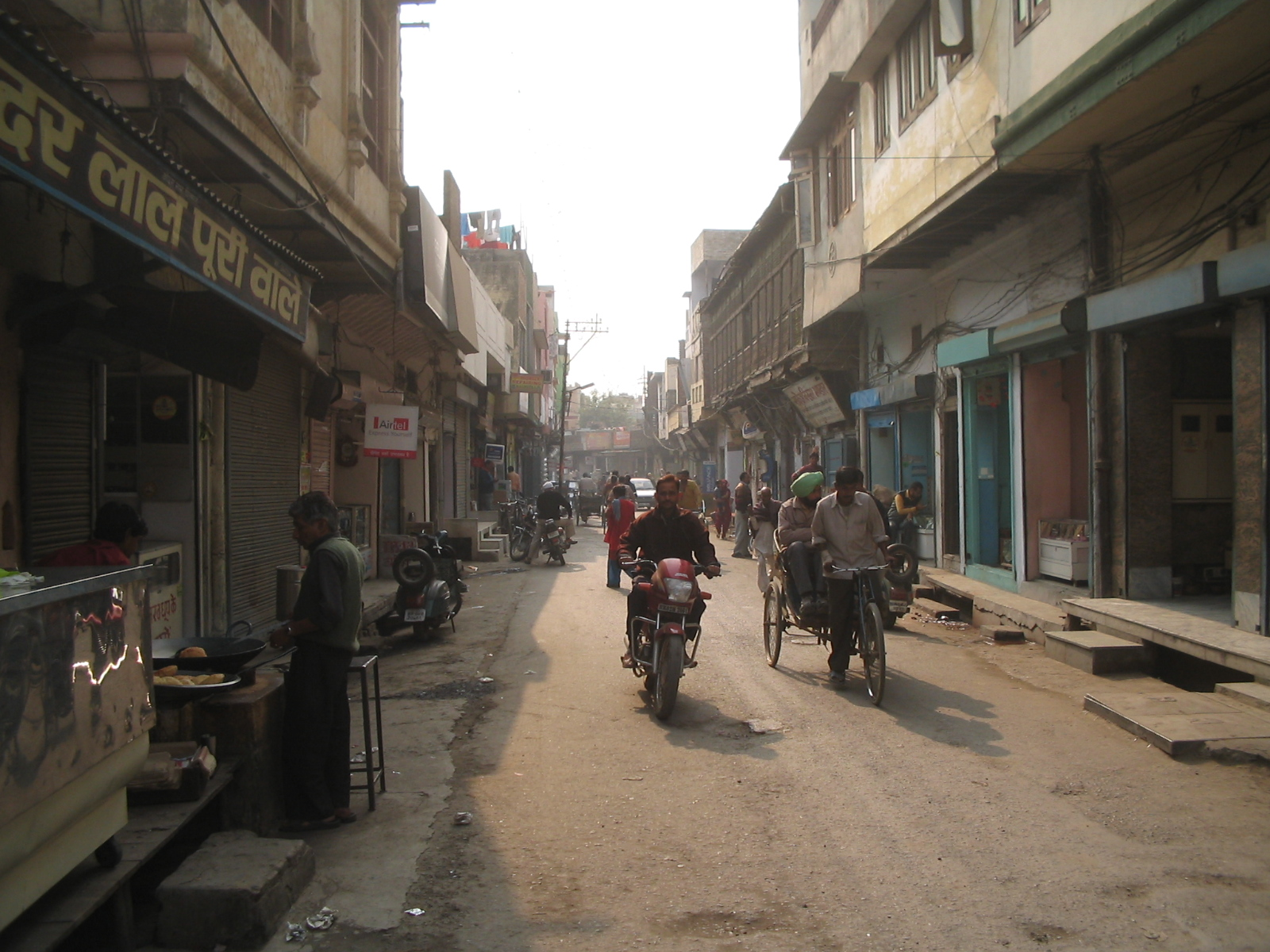
- Yamuna Group of Institutes, Old Street Mohalla Raipurian, Yamunanagar, Haryana, India

- Location in Haryana, India Yamunanagar (India) Yamunanagar (Asia)
- Coordinates: 30.133°N 77.288°E
- Country: India
- State: Haryana
- District: Yamunanagar

Government
  - Type: Municipal corporation
  - Body: Yamunanagar Municipal Corporation
  - Mayor: Suman Bahmani (BJP)
  - Lok Sabha MP: Varun Chaudhary (INC)
  - MLA: Ghanshyam Dass (BJP)
  - Municipal Commissioner: Ayush Sinha (IAS)
- Elevation: 255 m (837 ft)

Population (2011)
  - City: 216,628
  - Density: 687/km^{2} (1,780/sq mi)
  - Metro: 383,318

Languages
  - Official: Hindi
  - Additional official: English and Punjabi
  - Regional: Haryanvi
- Time zone: UTC+5:30 (IST)
- PIN: 135001
- Telephone code: 1732
- ISO 3166 code: IN-HR
- Vehicle registration: HR-02
- Airport: Karnal Airport
- Sex ratio: 877 ♂/♀
- Website: Yamunanagar Municipal Corporation

Yamunanagar is a city and a municipal corporation in Yamunanagar district in the Indian state of Haryana. This town is known for the cluster of plywood units and paper factories. It provides timber to larger industries. The older town is called Jagadhri. The Yamunanagar-Jagadhri railway station (YJUD) services the city. Despite its name, Jagadhri Railway is situated in Yamunanagar. There is also another railway station called Jagadhri Workshop in Yamunanagar.

== History ==
This town was part of Ambala district before it was made as separate district in November 1989. The town was formerly known as Abdullahpur and Jamnanagar. Before the Independence, it was a small village with most of the population lived around the railway station, which increased as a result of the migration of refugees from West Punjab after the partition.

== Geography ==
Yamunanagar has the river Yamuna (its namesake) running through the district, which forms the eastern boundary with the neighbouring Saharanpur district. This boundary is also a state boundary, as Saharanpur is in the state of Uttar Pradesh. The district also separates the Yamuna system from the Satluj river system.

From Yamunanagar, the Yamuna river enters the plain area for the first time. The mythical river Saraswati also originates from Adi badri, also located in the district. Towards its northern edge is a sub-mountainous region, which has more forest cover and many streams; it is the area where the river Yamuna flows out of the hills and into the plains. The northern boundary is also an interstate boundary with the state of Himachal Pradesh to the north. Sirmour in Himachal is the district to its north with the towns of Nahan and Paonta Sahib close to the boundary with Yamunanagar.

=== Climate ===
Yamunanagar is among the wettest districts in Haryana, receiving the state's highest average annual rainfall due to its location in the northeastern sub-mountainous zone. The region's geography is strongly influenced by the adjacent Shiwalik Range to the north and the Yamuna River to the east, which contribute to distinct microclimatic variations compared to the rest of the Indo-Gangetic Plain. Precipitation

The district receives an average annual rainfall of approximately 954 mm, with the vast majority occurring during the South Asian monsoon.

- Monsoon Season (June - September): Accounts for roughly 81% (777 mm) of the annual precipitation. Moisture-laden winds interacting with the Shiwalik foothills trigger enhanced orographic precipitation across the district.
- Non-Monsoon Rainfall: Western Disturbances contribute an average of 177 mm of rainfall, primarily during the winter months, aiding regional agricultural output.

Temperature and Seasons

Yamunanagar experiences a humid subtropical climate (Cwa under the Koppen climate classification), characterized by hot summers, cool winters, and a pronounced wet season.

Season	Typical Temperature Range	Climatological Characteristics
Summer (May -June)	42°C - 44°C (Max)	High thermal stress; frequent dry, hot Loo winds in May and early June, followed by rapid humidity buildup due to nearby riverine and topographical features.
Monsoon (July - September)	30°C - 35°C (Max)	High relative humidity accompanied by heavy, concentrated rainfall spells.
Winter (December -January)	15°C - 17°C (Max) 4°C - 5°C (Min)	Cold conditions with frequent heavy fog and radiation inversion, occasionally leading to cold-day conditions.

=== Rivers ===
The Western Yamuna Canal of the river Yamuna flows on one side of the city. This canal serves the irrigation needs of the farmers. The canal has century-old path ways, known locally as pattris, on both sides, which serve as connecting routes between villages even today and also help the irrigation department to maintain the canal and serve as a perfect scenic walk—with water on one side and green lush farms on other. The Yamuna river marks the boundary of the district with the state of Uttar Pradesh, which borders the city on the eastern side. The neighbouring city is Saharanpur in the state of Uttar Pradesh. The district borders the state of Himachal Pradesh, Sirmaur being the district and the towns of Nahan and Paonta Sahib being the towns nearby. Tajewala headworks—from where the Yamuna canal is diverted—also lies north of the city. Jagadhri is an adjoining town famous for its industrial brass sheet and stainless steel industry.

== Demographics ==
Religion in Yamunanagar City (2011)
1. Hinduism (83.3%)
2. Sikhism (10.1%)
3. Islam (5.78%)
4. Christianity (0.29%)
5. Jainism (0.25%)
6. Others/Not Stated (0.21%)

As per provisional data of census 2011, Yamunanagar urban agglomeration had a population of 383,318, out of which males were 205,346 and females were 177,972. The population in the age range 0 to 6 years was 40,950. The total number of literates were 293,475, of which males were 163,791 and females were 129,684. The effective literacy rate of the population above 7 years of age was 85.72 per cent.

== Government and politics ==
=== Civic administration ===
==== Yamunanagar-Jagadhri Municipal Corporation ====
The Yamunanagar-Jagadhri Municipal Corporation is headed by Municipal Commissioner Ayush Sinha,IAS. The elected head is Mayor Suman Bahmani. The city is divided into 22 wards for the purpose of development, each of which is represented by a municipal councillor.

== Economy ==
=== Industries ===
Yamuna Nagar is well known for its industries. It has emerged as an important industrial destination in the state. This has been despite its relatively isolated location within the state. Due to expanding industries, the city kept on extending geographically.

The main crops produced are sugarcane, wheat, and rice. The city also produces sugar machinery, paper machinery, and highly efficient equipment for petrochemical plants, which are shipped to various refineries across the country. The city is also known for its plywood industries, which is attributed to the easy accessibility of primary raw material – poplar tree. It has also one of India's largest railways, carriage and wagon repair workshops. Recently, Reliance Infrastructure has also installed Deenbandhu Chhotu Ram Thermal Power Station in the town. Haryana Urban Development Authority has done major development work in the land stretch linking the city with Jagadhri, the other part of Twin city which is known for its brass and stainless steel utensils.

== Tourism ==
Located at the base of Shivalik Hills, Yamuna Nagar has moderately developed tourism industry.

- Kalesar National Park is one of the tourist spots which can be seen here. The place is located at the borders of Haryana, Himachal Pradesh, Uttar Pradesh and Uttarakhand.
- Chaneti Buddhist Stupa is another notable tourist spot which according to Hieun Tsang, was built by King Ashoka.

== Transport ==
=== Railways ===
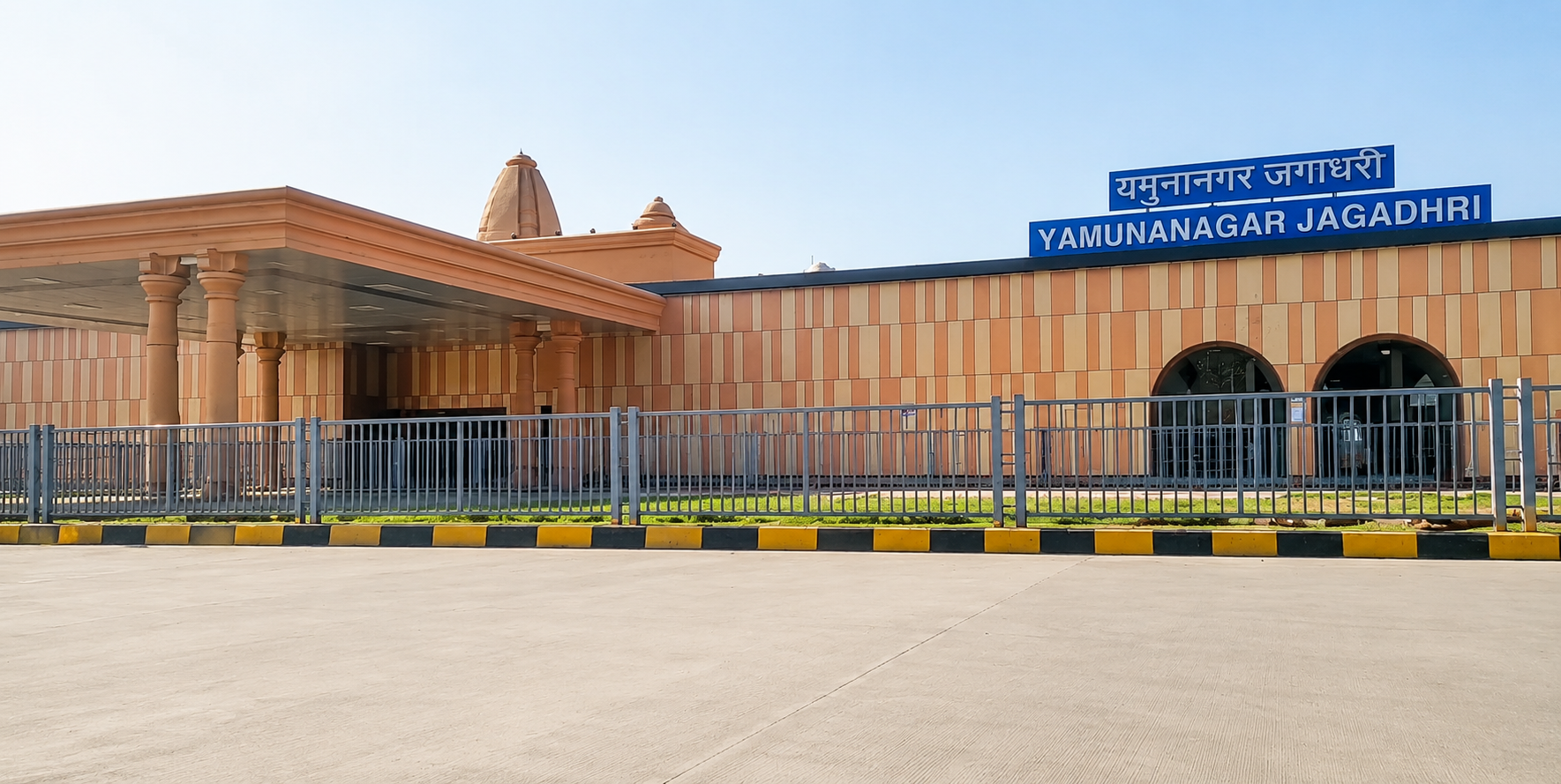
Yamuna Nagar Jagadhri Railway Station

Yamunanagar has two railway stations named Yamuna Nagar-Jagadhri and Jagadhri Workshop Railway station. It is on the popular direct route Amritsar–Kolkata Main Line. The 1,042 metres (3,419 ft) long Railway Bridge on River Yamuna connects Yamuna Nagar-Jagadhri with Saharanpur. The bridge is named after  Shyama Prasad Mukherjee.

=== Roadways ===
Yamunanagar is well-connected to Delhi and other cities in Haryana such as Panipat, Karnal, Ambala, Kurukshetra, Kaithal and Rohtak. Four-laning of the highway connecting Yamunanagar to the state capital of Chandigarh via Panchkula was recently completed.

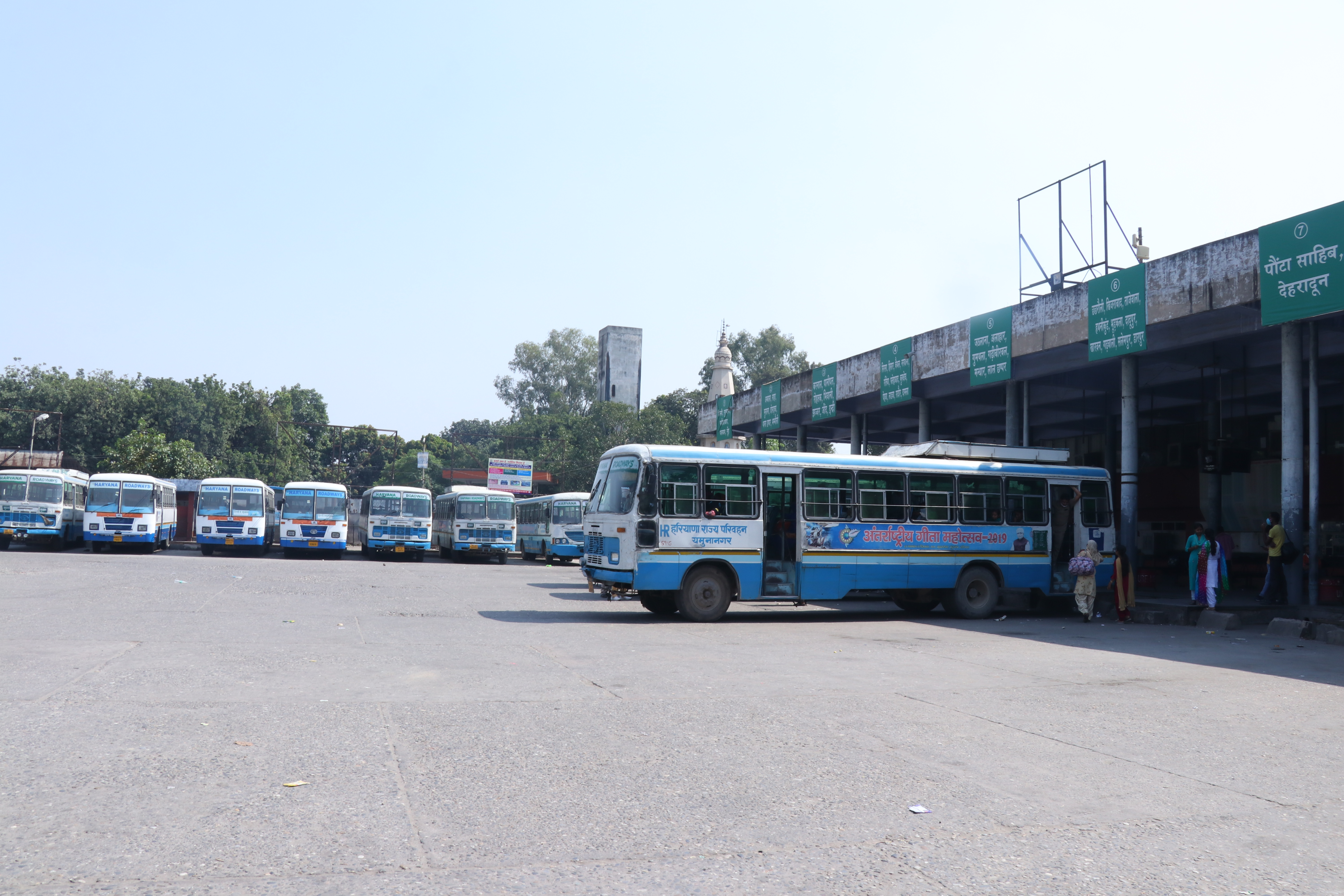
Bus Stand Yamunanagar

== Education ==
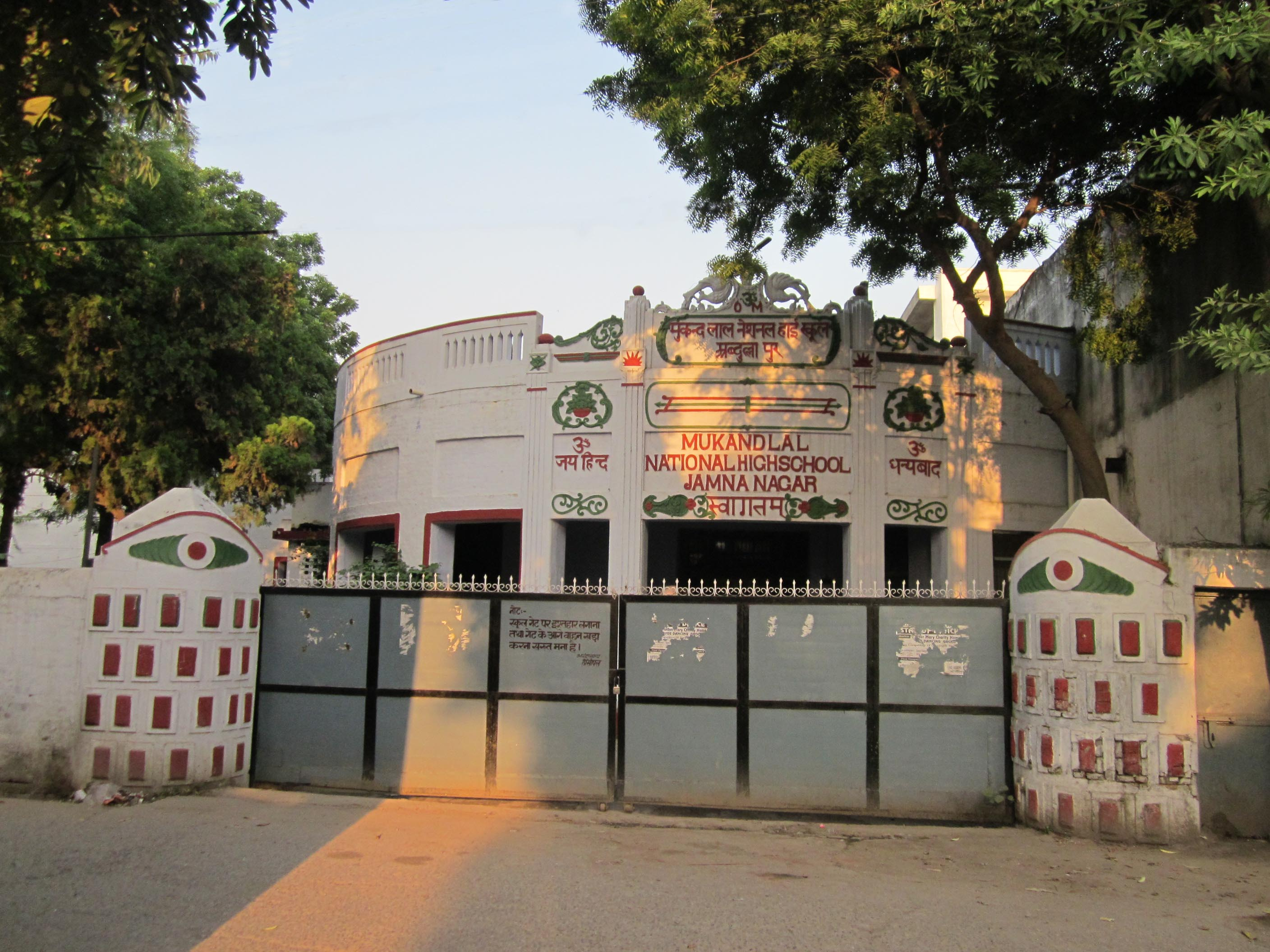
Mukand Lal National College

Colleges and other educational institutes include:

- Mukand Lal National College
- Seth Jai Parkash Mukand Lal Institute of Engineering and Technology
- S.D. Public School, Jagadhri

== Notable people ==
- Sunil Dutt, actor and politician, father of Sanjay Dutt
- Karnam Malleswari, first Indian woman to win an Olympic medal
- Sumeet Passi, footballer, plays for India national football team and Inter Kashi FC
- Sanjeev Rajput, Arjuna awardee shooter
- Rani Rampal, female hockey player
- Deepika Thakur, India women's national field hockey team player
- Darshan Lal Jain, Padma Bhushan awardee for social work
- Mandeep Kaur, sprinter, Asian Games record holder in 4x400m relay
