= Chhachhrauli =

- Town
- Haryanvi language
- Location in Haryana, India Chhachhrauli (India)
- Coordinates: 30.25°N 77.37°E
- Country: India
- State: Haryana
- District: Yamunanagar

Area
  - Total: 6.73 km^{2} (2.60 sq mi)
- Elevation: 258 m (846 ft)

Population (2011)
  - Total: 10,533
  - Density: 1,570/km^{2} (4,050/sq mi)

Languages
  - Official: Hindi
  - Regional: Haryanvi
- Time zone: UTC+5:30 (IST)
- Postal code: 135103
- ISO 3166 code: IN-HR
- Vehicle registration: HR-71
- Website: haryana.gov.in

Chhachhrauli is a town, tehsil and gram panchayat consisting of 20 wards in the Yamunanagar district in the state of Haryana, India. It is 11 km north-east of Yamunanagar city-Jagadhari. Chhachhrauli is often known as "Cherapunjii of Haryana" as it receives the most rain in the whole of Haryana . (The average for Haryana is 450mm in monsoon and Chhachhrauli receives 1100 mm.) It was a municipal committee until 1998. Before independence in 1947, it was the capital of the princely state of Kalsia.

Chhachhrauli has two areas: Khadar is a low-lying area near the banks of the Yamuna River. The population is predominantly Hindu Gujjars. It has fertile lands for agriculture, often struck by floods. Average rainfall is 1050 mm. Khadar is also known as Gujjar Land in Yamunanagar district due to the large number of Gujjars. Ghaad is a high-elevation area near the Shivalik Hills.

== Geography ==
Chhachhrauli is very close to the boundaries of Uttar Pradesh, Himachal and Uttarakhand. It is surrounded by the historical Gurudwara of Paonta Shahib, mythical Kapal Mochan (Bilaspur) and the well-known Panchmukhi Hanuman Temple. It is believed that the five Pandava brothers worshiped for some time after having won the Kurukshetra battle in Mahabharata.

Chhachhrauli has a big grain market (Anaj Mandi) where farmers from the surrounding areas bring their agricultural produce for ale. It is the hub of many villages like Singhpura, Sherpur, Chuharpur Khurd, Urjani, Yaqub Pur, Dasaura, Harauli and Pipli Majra. On the Chhachhrauli - Paunta Sahib road, Balachor, Panjeto, Mukarib Pur, Manakpur on the Chhachhrauli-Jagadhari road, Ganauli, Ganaula, Chholi Basatiyavala on the Chhachhrauli- Bilaspur road.

== Nearby attraction ==
Nearby attractions are:

- Shivalik Fossil Park
- Adi Badri (Haryana) at Somb river which is stretch of Sarasvati river emerging out of Shivalik hills, has Sarasvati kund and Adi Badri Museum to the west of Somb river, Adi Badri temple inside the bend of Somb river to the west, Badrinath temple to the south and east of the bend of Somb river, Mantra Devi temple to the east of Somb river, Adi Badri Buddhist stupa near Rampur Gainda village
- Kalesar National Park
- Dadupur barrage at the confluence of Western Yamuna Canal, Somb river and Boli river
- Tajewala Barrage to divert Yamuna river into Western Yamuna Canal
- Hathnikund Barrage is newer barrage to replace the Tajewal Barrage
- Kapal Mochan near Bilaspur, Haryana is a Hindu pilgrimage site that also houses historic Gurdwara Kapal Mochan that was visited by Guru Nanak

== History ==
Chhachhrauli was earlier the capital of Kalsia State created by Raja Gurbaksh Singh in 1763 and had two Tehsils outside Chhachhrauli, namely Dera Basi (near Chandigarh) and Kalsia (near Amritsar). Kalsia State was one of the eight states in Punjab which formed PEPSU after Independence in 1947. Later, it was merged with Punjab and, in 1966, with Haryana.

== Chhachhrauli Fort ==
Chhachhrauli Fort was built by the Raja of the erstwhile Kalsia state. The fort here earlier housed the state departments, including the state treasury and Tosh-i-Khana, and with a Dewan-Khana for official meetings, darbars and functions of the Raja Kalsia. It still has a clock tower occupying a prominent place in the fort area. The fort also houses "Ravi Mahal" and "Janak Niwas". The fort is currently in ruins.

== Education ==
There is a Government Senior Secondary School, which was upgraded from a high school. It was opened on 21 December 1915.

The Haryana State Government started a Government College in 2008. Chhachhrauli also has a separate Government Senior Secondary School for Girls.

== Demographics ==
As of 2011 India census, Chhachhrauli had a population of 10533. Males constitute 52% of the population and females 48%. Chhachhrauli has an average literacy rate of 75%, higher than the national average of 63%; with male literacy of 79% and female literacy of 71%. 10% of the population is under 6 years of age.

== See also ==
- Adi Badri
- Amadalpur
- Buria
- Chaneti Buddhist Stupa
- Kapal Mochan
- Sugh Ancient Mound
- Kalsia
