= Bahuara =

Bahuara may refer to these villages in India:

- Bahuara, Dildarnagar, Uttar Pradesh
- Bahuara, Saran district, Bihar
- Bahuara, Vaishali district, Bihar
