= Sugh Ancient Mound =

Archaeological site in Yamunanagar district, India

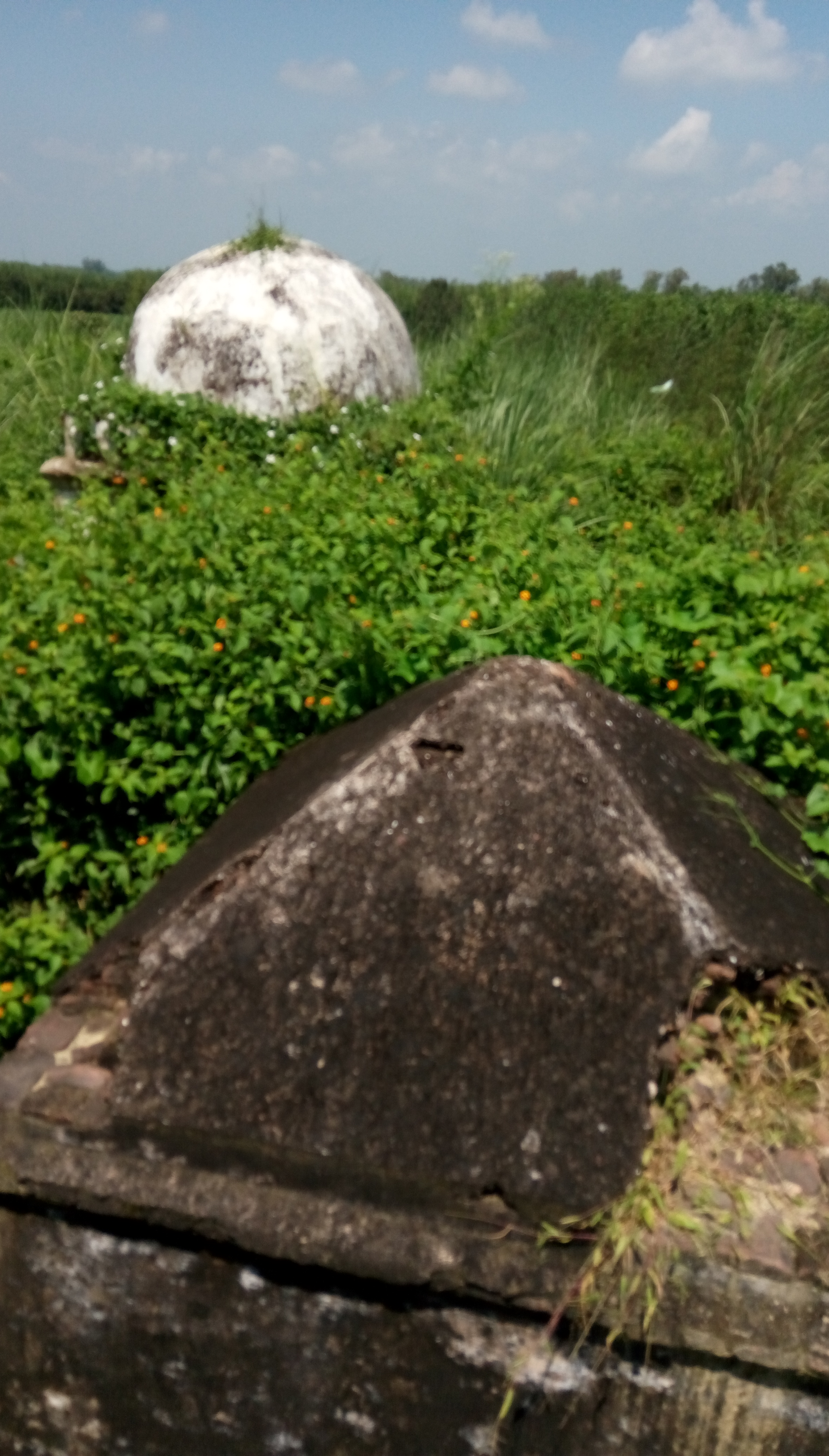

- Location within India
- 30.141915°N 77.354361°E
- Location: Amadalpur-Dayalgarh, Yamunanagar district, Haryana, India

Site notes
- Material: brick, mud mortar
- Circumference: 5 km
- Archaeologists: Dr. Suraj Bhan, Punjab University, Chandigarh; Shri D. S. Malik and Shri M. Acharya, Government of Haryana
- Management: Government of Haryana

Sugh Ancient Mound, also known as the Ancient Site of Sugh, is located in the village of Amadalpur Dayalgarh, in the Yamunanagar district of Haryana, India. Suryamandir-Tirth in Amadalpur is nearby. Buddhist stupa here is identified with the Srughna.

The circumference of the mound is about 5 km and it is situated on the west bank of the Yamuna river flood-plains.

As featured in Hiuen Tsang's travel accounts of India, the Sugh mound has ancient associations with the town of Shrughna. It also has a historical significance for Buddhists, Hindus and Jains.

The ancient Chaneti Buddhist Stupa is located nearby.

== Site ==
The mound lies buried under a house in Amadalpur village belonging to Valerie Hara, a Canadian who married Jat Sikh farmer Surinder Hara, who allows Buddhist monks to visit "I felt peaceful hearing them chant. They are always welcome."

== Excavation ==
Excavation was undertaken by Dr. Suraj Bhan from the Department of Ancient Indian History, Culture and Archaeology at Panjab University. Additional excavation was conducted by Shri M. Acharya and Shri D. S. Malik of the Department of Archaeology & Museums, Government of Haryana.

A 2000-year-old Vanar Sena terracotta was found here, possibly related to the ‘Vanar Sena’ of Lord Rama. Numerous artifacts related to Buddha had been excavated at this site.

== Nearby related sites ==
Adi Badri, Amadalpur, Buria, Chhachhrauli, Chaneti Buddhist Stupa, Kapal Mochan are other ancient sites.

== See also ==
- Bodh Stupa
- Buddhist pilgrimage sites in Haryana
- Buddhist pilgrimage sites
- Buddhist pilgrimage sites in India
