= Ganauli =

Village in Bihar, India

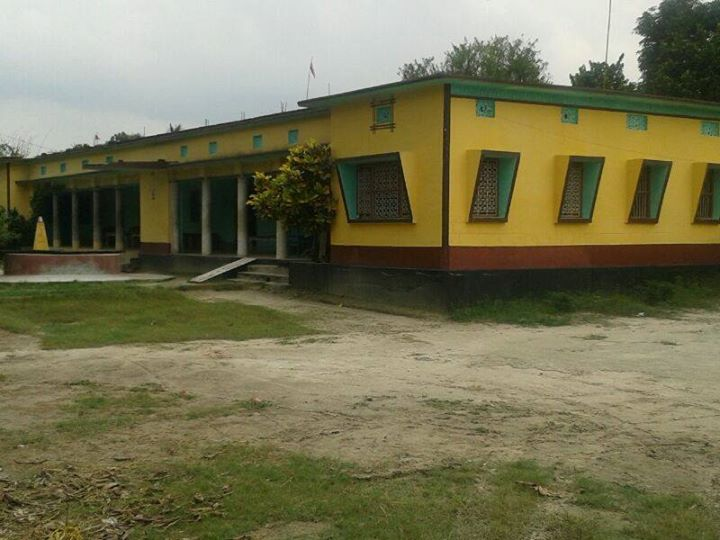

Ganauli is a village in Mashrakh, Saran district in the Indian state of Bihar. Ganauli is a part of Khajuri after 1930. There is a population of about 4,000. It has part of two Tola.

There is only one school in Ganauli village, which caters to the educational needs of the students.

Ganauli is connected by road to Khajuri, Ghoghiya, Bahuara and Pakri.
