= Pakri =

Pakri may refer to:

- Pakri Peninsula, vicinity of Paldiski, Estonia
  - Pakri Islands, adjacent to the peninsula
- Pakri, Ghazipur, India
- Pakri Barawan, a sub-divisional town in Nawada district of Indian State of Bihar
- Pakri, Bihar, a village in the west Champaran district in the Indian state of Bihar
- Pakri pakohi, a village in Muzaffarpur district of Bihar, India
