= Kapal Mochan =

Religious site in Haryana, India

Coordinates: 30°19′32″N 77°19′3″E

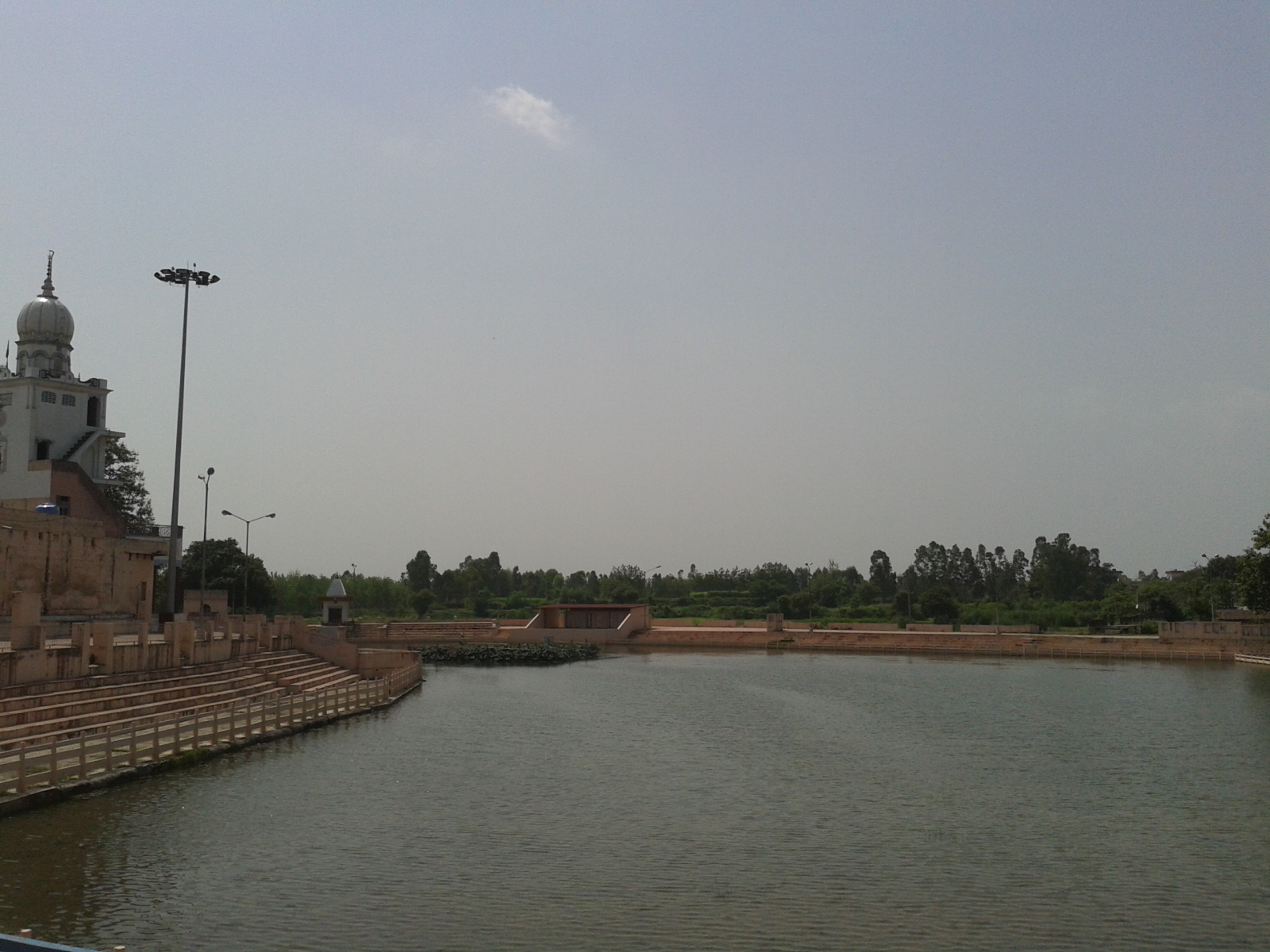
Kapal Mochan Sarovar and Gau-Bacha Temple

Gopal Mochan is an ancient place of pilgrimage for both Hindus and Sikhs, 17 km north-east of Yamunanagar city-Jagadhari town, on the Bilaspur road in Yamunanagar district, Haryana, India. It is also called Gopal Mochan and Somsar Mochan. As per Legend, Brāhmanahatya i.e. killing of Brahmin is considered as a major sin, but one who kills a Brahmin and bath here, his Brāhmanahatya sins will be washed. Nearby Bilaspur, Haryana (not to be confused with Bilaspur, Himachal Pradesh) in Yamuna Nagar District which takes its name from the corrupted form of "Vyas Puri", was the ashram of Ved Vyasa rishi where he wrote the Mahabharta on the banks of Sarasvati river near Adi Badri where Sarasvati river leaves Himalayas and enters the plains.

It is one of the most ancient vedic religious site in Haryana along with 48 kos parikrama of Kurukshetra and Dhosi Hill.

== Demographics ==
As of 2001 India census, Bilaspur had a population of 9620. Males constitute 53% of the population and females 47%. Bilaspur has an average literacy rate of 65%, higher than the national average of 59.5%; with male literacy of 69% and female literacy of 61%. 14% of the population is under 6 years of age.

== Kapal Mochan Tirth Mela ==
The place finds mention in the Puranas and the Mahabharata, and was visited by Mahadeva, Rama and Pandavas.

There is historical Mahadev Temple, Gau Bacha Temple and Gurdwara with ancient Pool. Every year, nearly five lakh pilgrims visit the place during the annual, "Kapal Mochan Mela" during November.

As part of INR1200 crore Morni to Kalesar tourism development plan announced in January 2019, Government of Haryana is developing Kapal Mochan Tirth centered around the sacred pond, along with Kalesar Mahadev temple, Panchmukhi Hanuman temple of Basatiyawala, Sharda Mata Temple of Chotta Trilokpur and Lohgarh fort capital of Banda Singh Bahadur.

== History ==
=== Shiva's visit ===
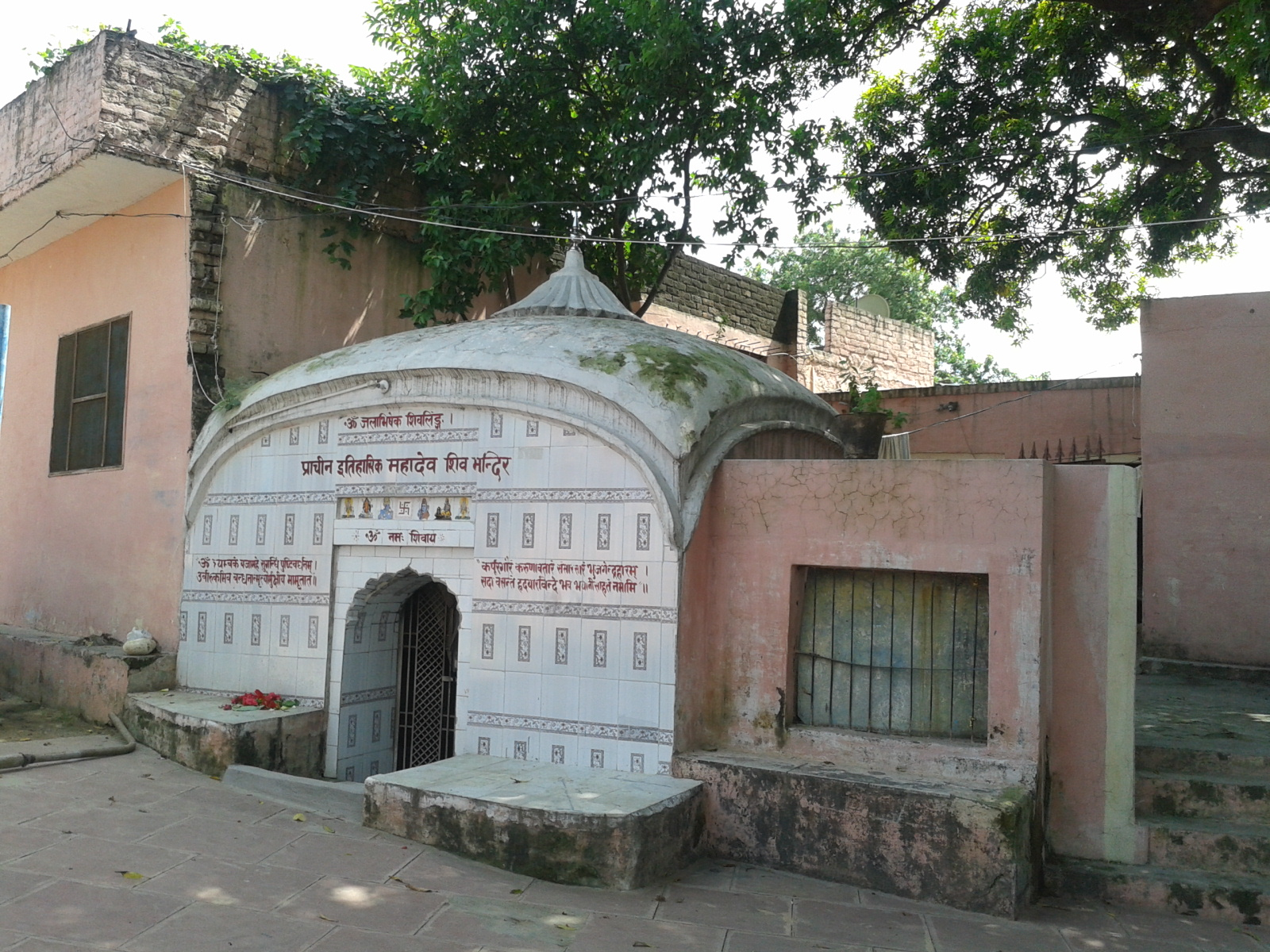
Mahadev Temple

Shiva also visited this place after killing Brahma Ji.

=== Rama's visit ===
According to local legend, in the Treta Yuga (age) Rama came here in his Pushpak Viman after killing Ravana (a Brahmin from his father's side). From that day this pond is called Surya Kund

=== Guru Nanak ji's visit ===
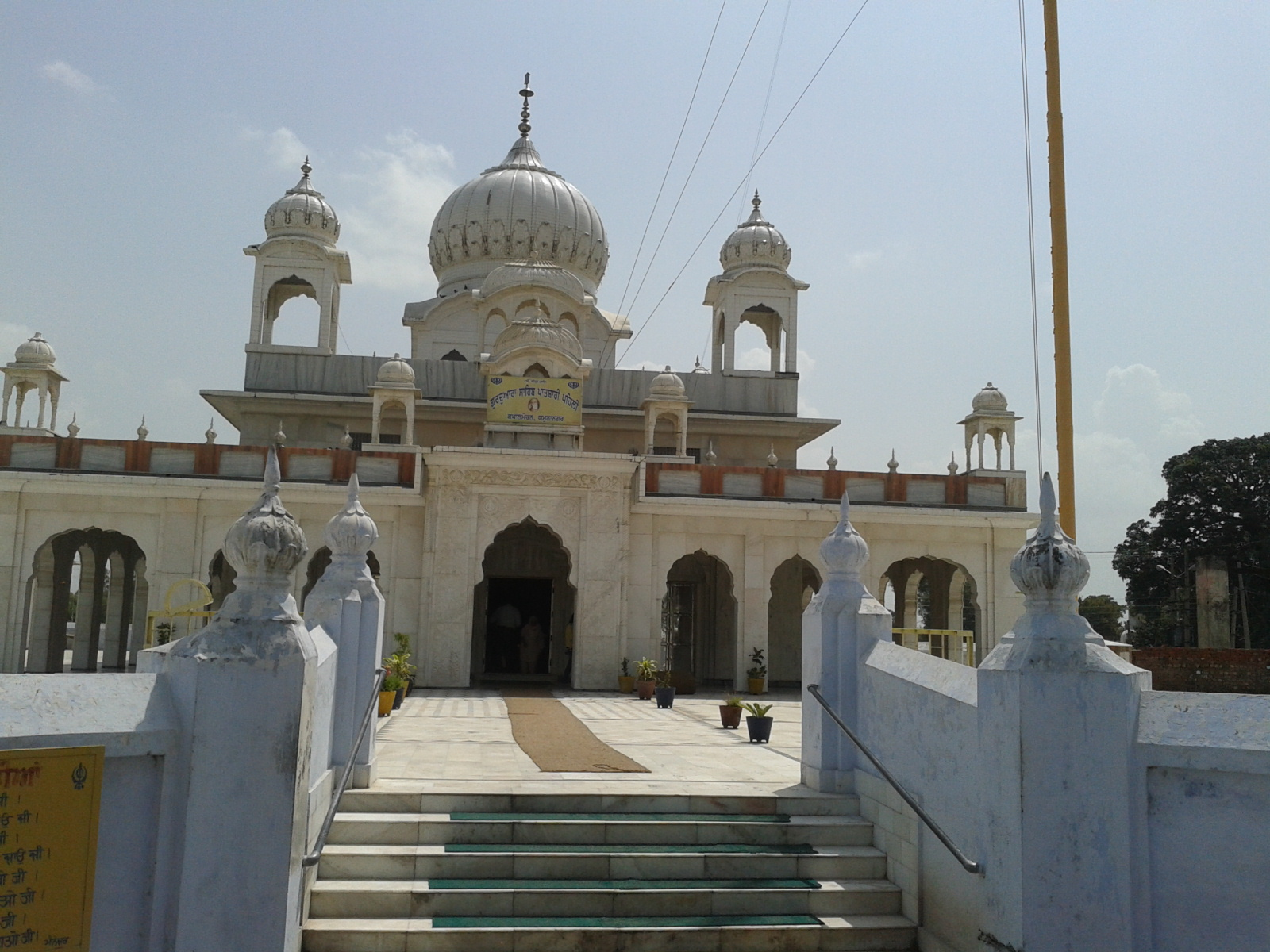
Gurdwara Kapal Mochan, commemorates visit of Guru Nanak and Guru Gobind Singh

Guru Nanak ji stopped here during one of his udasis in 1584 and have spoke to a large gathering disputing the ritual of Sootak (the concept that a newborn baby is born impure). According to Sri Guru Nanak Dev Ji, Sootak is there on Mind when it is entangles in vices. Adi Granth states: ਮਨ ਕਾ ਸੂਤਕੁ ਲੋਭੁ ਹੈ ਜਿਹਵਾ ਸੂਤਕੁ ਕੂੜੁ ॥ ਅਖੀ ਸੂਤਕੁ ਵੇਖਣਾ ਪਰ ਤ੍ਰਿਅ ਪਰ ਧਨ ਰੂਪੁ ॥ ਕੰਨੀ ਸੂਤਕੁ ਕੰਨਿ ਪੈ ਲਾਇਤਬਾਰੀ ਖਾਹਿ ॥. A Gurdwara Sahib is located which commemorates his visit.

=== Guru Gobind Singh's ji visit ===
Guru Gobind Singh ji visited Kapal Mochan after Battle of Bhangani in 1688 and gave robes of honour (turbans) to soldiers who fought this victorious war against Hill Rulers. He also had discourse with priests of temple on Durga. He gave Hukamnama to temple priests which is still preserved by them. Also, Guru Gobind Singh ji and his soldiers get temple, rid of those people, who pollute the pond water, by doing toilets on short distances from ponds. In Dasam Granth, Khalsa Mahima (the praise of Khalsa) and Charitar 71 describe a few events happened during Guru Gobind Singh ji's stay at Kapal Mochan.

== Nearby Attractions ==
Nearby Bilaspur, Haryana (not to be confused with Bilaspur, Himachal Pradesh) in Yamuna Nagar District which takes its name from the corrupted form of "Vyas Puri", was the ashram of Ved Vyasa rishi where he wrote the Mahabharta on the banks of Sarasvati river near Adi Badri where Sarasvati river leaves Himalayas and enters the plains. On Jagadhari road lies another popular religious site of Kapal Mochan.

Adi Badri, Amadalpur, Buria, Chhachhrauli, Chaneti Buddhist Stupa and Sugh Ancient Mound are other ancient sites.
