= Buria =

Buria Buria sahib
- town
- Location in Haryana, India Buria (India)
- Coordinates: 30.15°N 77.35°E
- Country: India
- State: Haryana
- District: Yamunanagar

Population (2001)
  - Total: 9,829

Languages
  - Official: Hindi
- Time zone: UTC+5:30 (IST)
- PIN: 135101
- ISO 3166 code: IN-HR
- Vehicle registration: HR02
- Website: haryana.gov.in

Buria is a small town and earlier was a municipal committee now the part of Yamunanagr Nagar nigam situated on the banks of the Western Yamuna Canal approximately 3 kilometres (1.9 mi) from the city of Jagadhri and 8 km from Jagadhri railway station. Buria was ruled by Jats of Mannan clan from 1764 to 1947.

== History ==
Buri Fort, there is a fort in Buria, with Rang Mahal (pleasure palace) used by Hamayun when he came here for hunting in Shivalik forests, whereas some relate this Rang Mahal to Birbal, court advisor to the Mughal emperor Akbar. The presence of Birbal Dwar (Birbal Gate) in the village indicates relation to Birbal.

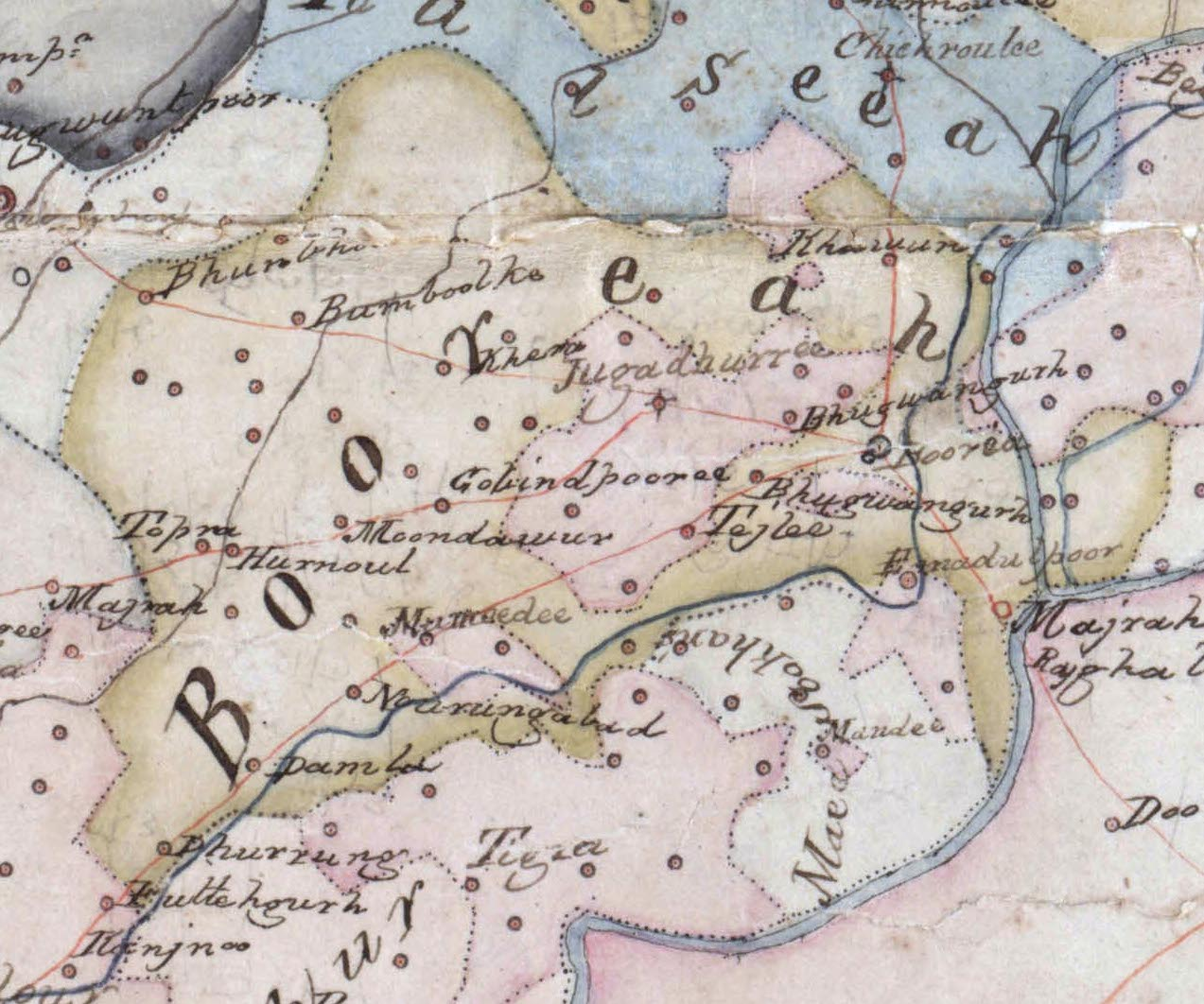
Detail of the main, continuous tract of territory of Buria State from a map created by the British East India Company, ca.1829–1835.

During the British Raj, Buria was captured by the Sikhs in 1760, and became the headquarters of a Jat principality, which before the Treaty of Amritsar (1809) between the British and Maharaja Ranjit singh had been divided into two chiefships of Buria and Dialgarh. Contention between the widows of the last male holder of Dialgarh led to its subdivision into the estates of Jagadhri and Dialgarh which after few years came under British protection. Jagadhri jagir lapsed in 1829 and came under direct British control. The Rani of Dialgarh was one of the nine chiefs who were retained as independent protected chiefs. She retained her position until her death in 1852, after which jagir of Dialgarh also lapsed and it came under direct British rule. Buria proper was also reduced to the status of an ordinary jagir in 1849.

Other attractions include the medieval "Pataleshwar Mahadev Shiv Mandir", the "Sanatan Dharam Hanuman Mandir" and a Gurudwara (Sikh temple) in remembrance of the ninth Sikh Guru Tegh Bahadur.

== Buria CCS HAU Regional Research Station ==
Buria CCS HAU Regional Research Station, with 26 acres (11 ha) of orchard, is a Regional Research Station of Chaudhary Charan Singh Haryana Agricultural University.

This research station is meant for the Horticultural Research in the region. Presently, the work is based on the germplasms of mango, litchi, pear, peach, plum, sapota, guava, apple, loquat and lemon. The research station is equipped with one tractor, one hydraulic trolley, one power weeder as implements. Also the mulching experiments were going on based on litchi, mango, and sapota. There are two scientists working as Assistant Scientist (Agronomy) and one Assistant Scientist (Horticulture).

== Demographics ==
As of 2001 India census, Buria had a population of 9829. Males constitute 55% of the population and females 45%. Buria has an average literacy rate of 58%, lower than the national average of 59.5%; with male literacy of 65% and female literacy of 50%. 14% of the population is under six years of age. Now Buria has a good education facility two private and one Govt sen Sec School along with one primary school.

== See also ==
- Adi Badri
- Amadalpur
- Chhachhrauli
- Chaneti Buddhist Stupa
- Kapal Mochan
- Sugh Ancient Mound
