= Srughna =

Ancient city or kingdom of India

Coordinates: 30.141915°N 77.354361°E

Location of Srughna/ Sughana.

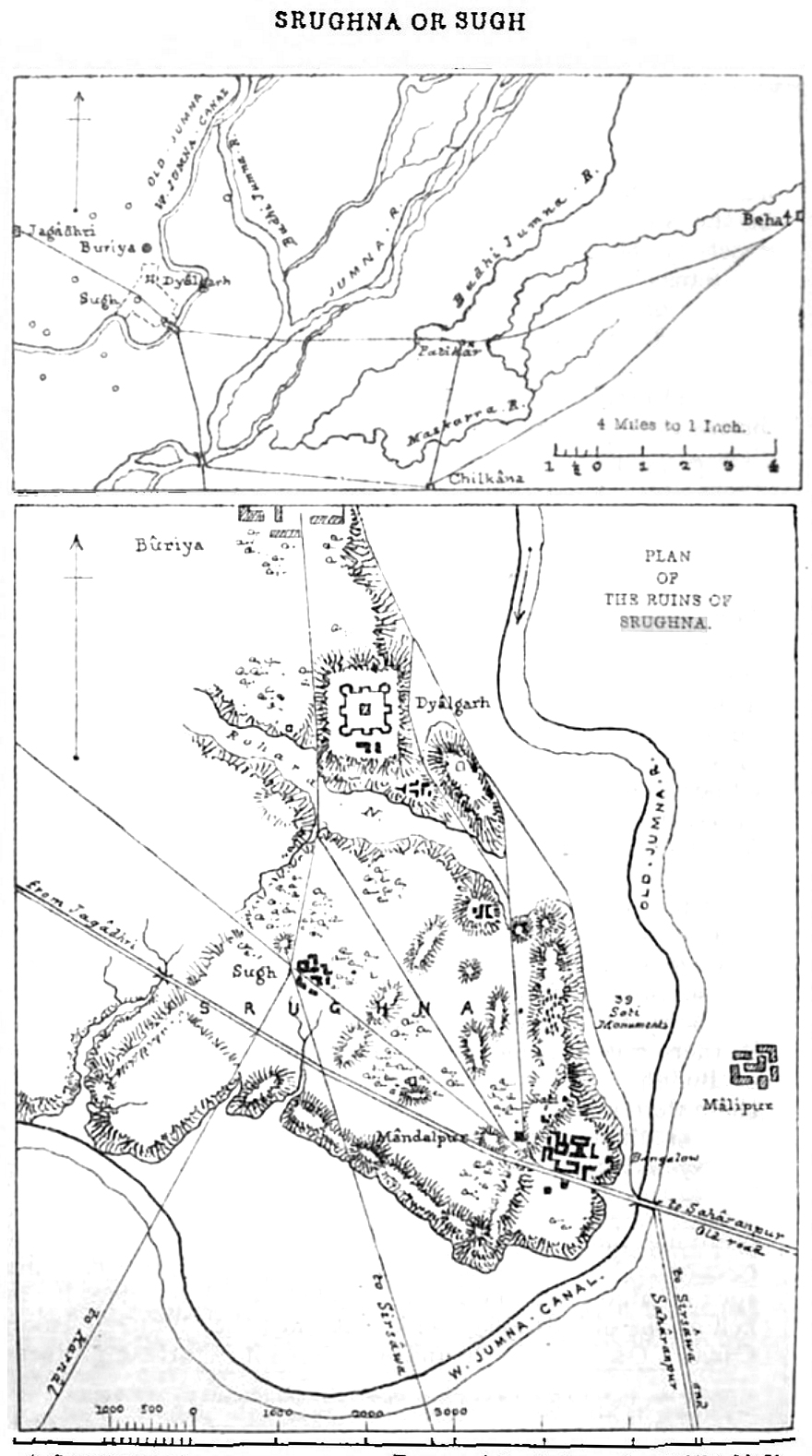
Plan of the ancient city of Srughna or Sugh.

Srughna, also spelt Shrughna in Sanskrit, or Sughna, Sughana or Sugh in the spoken form, was an ancient city or kingdom of India frequently referred to in early and medieval texts. It was visited by Chinese traveller, Xuanzang (Hiuen Tsang) in the 7th century and was reported to be in ruins even then although the foundations still remained. Xuanzang described the kingdom as extending from the mountains to the north, to the Ganges river to the East, and with the Yamuna river flowing through it. He described the capital city on the west bank of the Yamuna as possessing a large Buddhist vihara and a grand stupa dating to the time of the Mauryan emperor, Ashoka. Srughna is identified with the Sugh Ancient Mound located in the village of Amadalpur Dayalgarh, in the Yamunanagar district of Haryana state of India. To this day, the ancient Chaneti Buddhist Stupa, probably dating to the Mauryan period, stands in the area, about 3 kilometres (1.9 mi) northwest of Sugh.

== Identification ==
Xuanzang saw several stupas, which commemorated the visit of the Buddha or enshrined the relics of Buddhist monks Sariputra and Maudgalyayana. Alexander Cunningham identified the lost city with the village of Sugh (or Sugha) situated 5 kilometres (3.1 mi) from Yamunanagar in the state of Haryana. The city probably lost its importance after the 7th century and the name survived in a localized form. Panjab University's 1965 excavation found artifacts dating from 600 BCE to 300 CE, including grey ware and red ware pottery, coins, seals, animal remains, male and female terracotta figurines, animal terracotta figurines and miscellaneous terracotta objects such as flesh rubbers, crucibles, rattle, gamesmen, stamp, seal impression, discs, frames and wheels, balls, goldsmiths heating cup, an ear ornament grooved on the exterior and a broken figurine of a headless child with writing board in lap with sunga (187 BCE to 78 BCE) period alphabets. Collection of these figurines belong to Sunga, Mauryan, Kushana, Gupta and medieval period.

Srughna is regularly mentioned in Panini's Ashtadhyayi, Patanjali's Mahabhashya, the Divyavadana, the Mahabharata, the Mahamayuri, the Brihatsamhita of Varahamihira, etc. Tūrghna, another location mentioned in ancient literary texts, is considered synonymous with Srughna.

The village of Sugh, with the nearby Sugh Ancient Mound, is now a well known archaeological site which has yielded a trove of coins. It was excavated by Cunningham in the 19th century. Suraj Bhan partially excavated the site in 1964–65.

The original site of the Topra Kalan pillar of Ashoka is located about 18 kilometres (11 mi) to the west. Ashoka's Rock edicts of Khalsi is also from the region, about 60 kilometres (37 mi) to the northeast.

== Dhanabhuti, king of "Sugana" ==
It has been proposed that King Dhanabhuti, the main sponsor of the Buddhist stupa at Bharhut, came from Srughna or Sughana, and that Dhanabhuti was one of its important kings, who, besides building magnificent stupas in his capital city, also made some of the most important donations for the building of the toranas and railings at Bharhut.

Child learning Brahmi (2nd century BCE, Sugh)
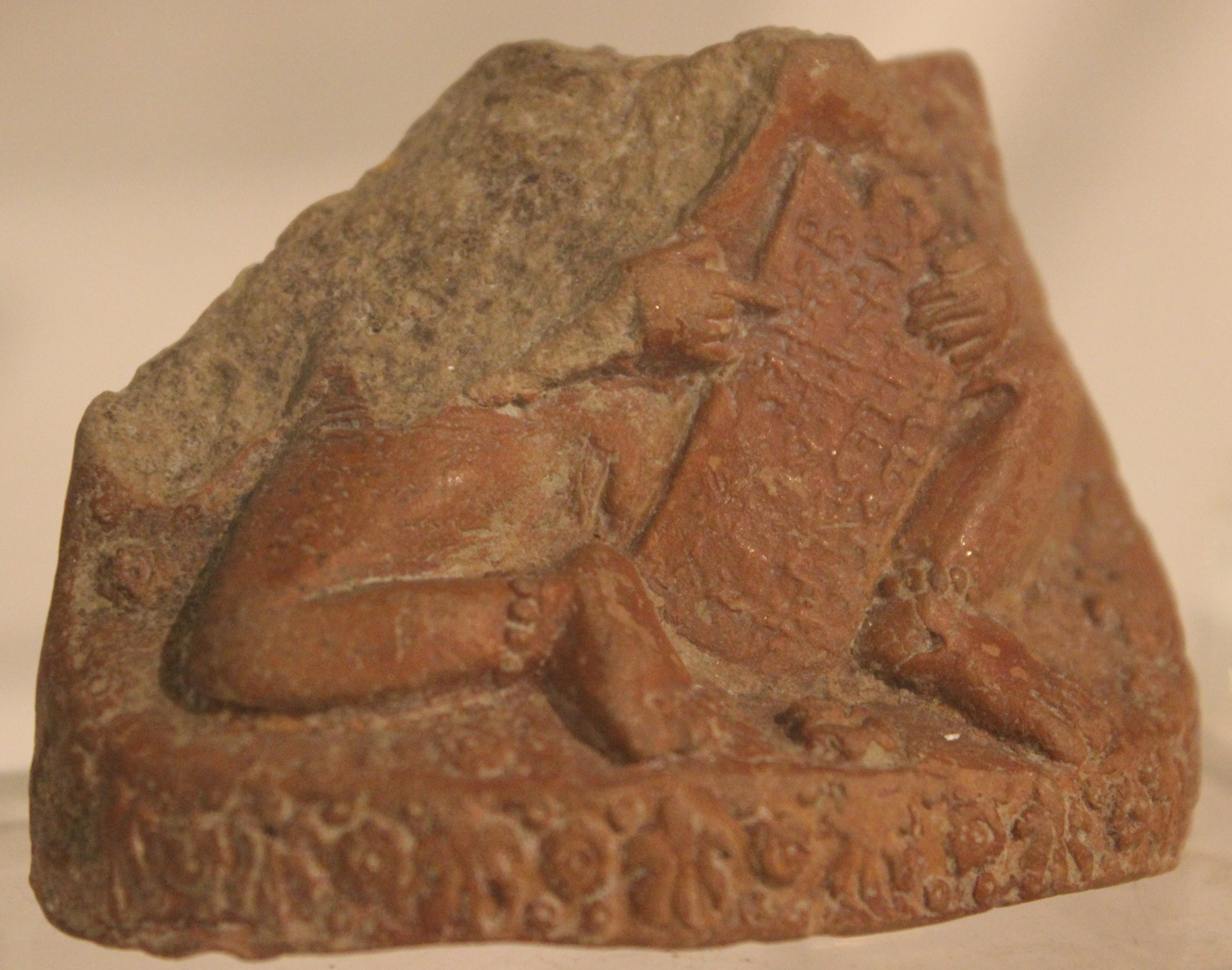
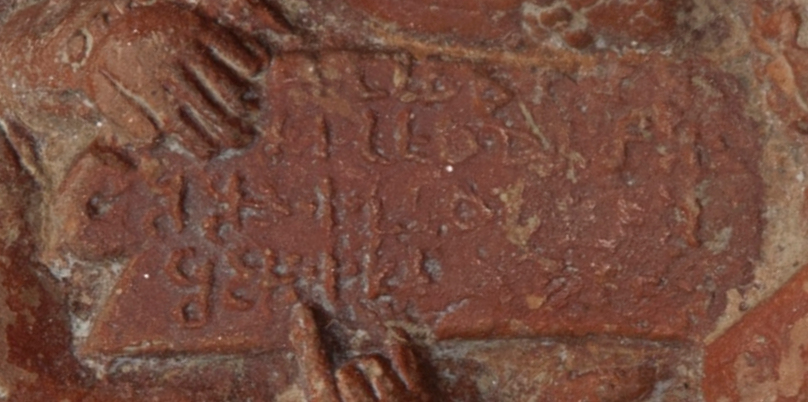
Ancient terracota sculpture from Sugh "Child learning Brahmi", 2nd century BCE. The writing on the takhtī writing tablet consists in a line made of the 12 primary Brahmi vowels (a Bhārākhadī), repeated four times, in a script identical to that of Ashoka (an indicator for the object's datation):
a ā i ī u ū e ai o au aṃ aḥ
𑀅 𑀆 𑀇 𑀈 𑀉 𑀊 𑀏 𑀐 𑀑 𑀒 𑀅𑀁 𑀅𑀂

== See also ==
- Sugh Ancient Mound
- Buddhist pilgrimage sites in Haryana
- Buddhist pilgrimage sites
- Buddhist pilgrimage sites in India
