= Harayana Saraswati Heritage Development Board =

Indian government body

The Haryana Sarasvati Heritage Development Board (HSHDB)

Agency overview
- Formed: 12 October 2015
- Jurisdiction: Government of Haryana
- Annual budget: 14 Crores
- Agency executives: Nayab Singh Saini, Chairman; Dhuman Singh Kirmach, Deputy Chairman
- Website: https://haryanasarasvatiboard.in/

The Haryana Sarasvati Heritage Development Board (HSHDB) is an Indian government body constituted by the Haryana Government on 12 October 2015 under the chairmanship of Manohar Lal Khattar, then Chief Minister of Haryana.

The objective of this board includes the Rejuvenation of the Sarasvati River and the development of the Sarasvati-linked Heritage including the construction of DAM, Reservoir, and Barrage for continuation of flow of water in the paleochannel of Sarasvati, Renovation of temples, Provision of civic amenities to the visiting pilgrims and tourists.

== Projects ==
In 2021 a budget of 14 crores was allocated by the Haryana Government to this board for the first phase beautification project. This board will also participate in construction of DAM at Adi Badri. The board has also planned on creating 5 riverfronts at Pipli and Pehowa in Kurukshetra district, Bilaspur in Yamunanagar district, and on the Panchkula-Yamunanagar highway near Dosarka village, and the Kaithal-Guhla road.
