= Saraswati Wildlife Sanctuary =

Wildlife sanctuary in Haryana, India

- IUCN category IV (habitat/species management area)
- Location within Haryana Location within India
- Interactive map of Saraswati Wildlife Sanctuary
- Location: Kaithal district, Haryana
- Coordinates: 29°59′34″N 76°21′24″E
- Area: 44.53 km^{2} (17.19 sq mi)
- Elevation: 215
- Established: 29 July 1988
- Website: haryanaforest.gov.in/protect.aspx

Saraswati Conservation Reserve ( Formerly Wildlife Sanctuary (Saraswati WLS), also known as Seonsar Forest, is situated in Kaithal district of Haryana State, India. It is spread over an area of 4,452.85 hectares (11,003.2 acres).

Kalesar National Park, Morni Hills and Saraswati Conservation Reserve ( formerly Wildlife Sanctuary ) are respectively first, second and third largest forest in Haryana.

== Location ==
It is 10 kilometres (6.2 mi) away from Pehowa, 40 kilometres (25 mi) from Kurukshetra, 60 kilometres (37 mi) from Kaithal on the Pehowa-Cheeka-Patiala Road, 62 kilometres (39 mi) from Patiala, 66 kilometres (41 mi) from Ambala, 108 kilometres (67 mi) from Chandigarh, 150 kilometres (93 mi) from Hisar, 67 kilometres (42 mi) from Karnal, 200 kilometres (120 mi) from Delhi.

It is only nearly 30 kilometres (19 mi) from Bir Gurdialpura Wildlife Sanctuary in Patiala district of Punjab.

== History ==
'Saraswati Plantation' was notified as Saraswati Wildlife Sanctuary on 29 July 1988. 'Saraswati Wildlife Sanctuary' was notified as Saraswati Conservation Reserve on 11 October 2007.

== Archaeological remains ==
The Tribune reported on 9 April 2016 that Mahant and members of a dera of Nath yogis in the sanctuary found the ancient rectangular bricks from a 15 feet deep structure after an old banyan tree was uprooted. According to Rajendra Singh Rana, curator of Kurukshetra’s Srikrishna Museum, prima facie these bricks and structure appears to be older than 1500 years old as square bricks are associated with 1,500 years old Gupta period (320 CE to 550 CE) and these bricks are likely to be even older from the Kushan (30 CE to 375 CE) period as the Sarasvati River use to flow here.

There is also a 40 years old water well made of small lakhauri bricks associated with the Mughal Empire era.

== Ecology ==
The 11,000 acre Saraswati WLS has rich biodiversity.

=== Flora ===
The Saraswati Wildlife Sanctuary is a prime example of the "Sub–group 5B tropical deciduous forest" vegetation type as classified by Champion and Seth. The sanctuary's flora is a mix of natural and plantation species, with a notable presence of trees, herbs, shrubs, and grasses. Dominant tree species found here include Vachellia nilotica (Kikar), Albizia lebbek (Siris), Azadirachta indica (Neem), Dalbergia sissoo (Shisham), and various species of the Ficus genus, such as Ficus religiosa (Peepal) and Ficus bengalensis (Banyan). The sanctuary also hosts plantation species like Eucalyptus hybrid and Morus alba (Mulberry), which are common in the region.

The botanical diversity of the sanctuary extends beyond just trees. Research has identified a significant number of plant species, including dicots and monocots, as well as pteridophytes. Families such as Asteraceae, Convolvulaceae, Caesalpiniaceae, and Amaranthaceae are particularly well-represented. The presence of these diverse plant groups creates a rich habitat that provides food, shelter, and breeding grounds for the sanctuary's various animal species. The sanctuary's vegetation, therefore, is not only a key component of its ecosystem but also a vital resource for its fauna.

=== Fauna ===
Saraswati Wildlife Sanctuary is a crucial habitat for a variety of animals, with its rich biodiversity attracting wildlife enthusiasts and researchers. The sanctuary is particularly known for its diverse bird population, making it a popular destination for birdwatchers. Over 250 species of birds, both resident and migratory, have been reported in the sanctuary. Common bird species include the Indian Peafowl (Pavo cristatus), kingfishers, herons, and various waterfowl, especially during the winter months when migratory species visit the wetlands and water bodies within the sanctuary.

Apart from avian life, the sanctuary provides a haven for several mammal species. Key among these are the Nilgai (Boselaphus tragocamelus) and spotted deer (Axis axis), which are frequently sighted in the area. Other resident mammals include wild boars, wild cats, snakes, and monkeys. The sanctuary also has a recorded presence of reptiles and other macrofauna.

== Conservation ==
Haryana government plans to construct 2 to 3 more water reservoirs for wild animals during summers, a jungle safari including the crocodile farm. The trail for the Jungle Safari during the International Saraswati Mahotsav received good response. On 11 August 2025, Chief Minister Nayab Saini, at state-level Van Mahotsav organised at Seonsar in Kurukshetra district, laid the foundation stone for the construction of Saraswati Wetland Reservoir, Saraswati Flora and Biodiversity Conservation Park, and Saraswati Jungle Safari within Saraswati WLS. The Saraswati WLS already has over 2 dozen large manmade perennial water reservoirs.

== See also ==
- List of National Parks & Wildlife Sanctuaries of Haryana, India
- Haryana Tourism
- List of Monuments of National Importance in Haryana
- List of State Protected Monuments in Haryana
- List of Indus Valley Civilization sites in Haryana, Punjab, Rajasthan, Gujarat, India and Pakistan
- List of national parks of India
- Wildlife sanctuaries of India
- Kalesar National Park, 15 km from Yamunanagar
- Sultanpur National Park, 25 km from Gurgaon on Chhachhrauli road
- Bir Shikargah Wildlife Sanctuary, Pinjore
