= Kalsia =

Sikh state

Coordinates: 30.25°N 77.37°E

Kalsia State
- Princely State of British India
- 1763–1948
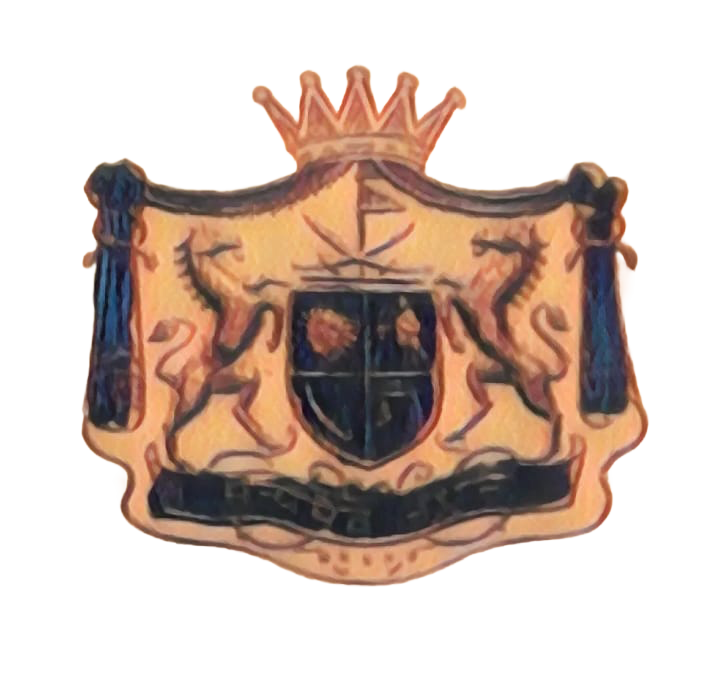
- Coat of arms

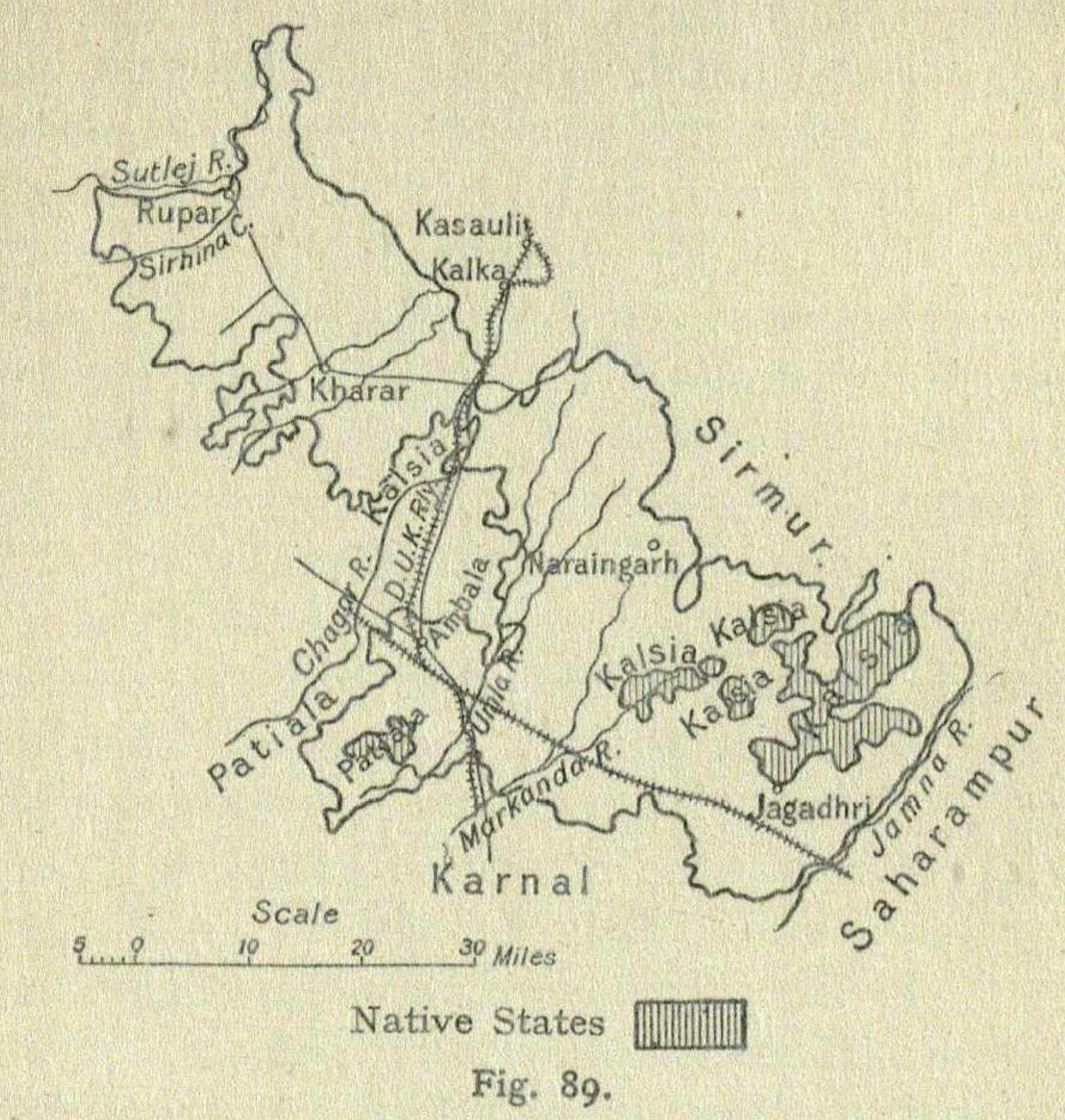
- Map of Ambala district (with Kalsia State) of Punjab Province, British India, published in 'The Panjab, North-West Frontier Province and Kashmir' (1916)
- Capital: Chhachhrauli
- Area
  - 1901: 435 km^{2} (168 sq mi)
- Population
  - 1901: 67,132
- History
  - Established: 1763
  - Independence of India: 1948
Preceded by	Succeeded by
Singh Krora Misl	India
- Today part of: Punjab & Haryana, India

Kalsia was a princely state in Punjab, British India, one of the former Cis-Sutlej states. It was founded by Gurbaksh Singh Kalsia in 1760. After India's independence, it was included in PEPSU and later in the Indian East Punjab after the States Reorganisation Act, 1956. The area of Kalsia is now located in the modern day Indian states of Punjab and Haryana. In 1940 the population of Kalsia was 67,393. Kalsia was ruled by Jat Sikhs.

== Geography ==
The area of Kalsia was 435 km^{2} (168 sq mi), consisting of 20 detached pieces of territory in the Ambala and Ferozepur districts, lying mainly between 30°12' and 30°25'N and 77°21' and 77°35'E. It was divided into 3 major parts: two tehsils, Chhachhrauli and Basi, and a sub-tehsil named Chirak, in Ferozepur district. It had contained 181 villages in 1903. The capital of Kalsia state was Chhachhrauli.

== History ==
The state of Kalsia was founded by Gurbaksh Singh in 1760. He joined the Kroria Misl of the Sikh Confederacy. Maharaja Ranjit Singh had granted the estate of Chhachhrauli to Gurbaksh Singh, a commander of his troops and a resident of Kalsia village. Gurbaksh Singh named the state "Kalsia" and Chhachhrauli became its capital city.

Raja Gurbaksh Singh was not famous, but his successor and son, Jodh Singh was an able person. At that time the area of Kalsia state comprised the territory between the Yamuna and the Markanda stream. Jodh Singh captured Dera Basi from Sardar Khajan Singh and also acquired territories of Lohal and Achrak. When Ranjit Singh attacked and occupied Naraingarh in the Shivaliks in 1807, Jodh Singh was with him. In recognition of his services, Ranjit Singh presented him territories of Badala, Kameri and Chhabbal.

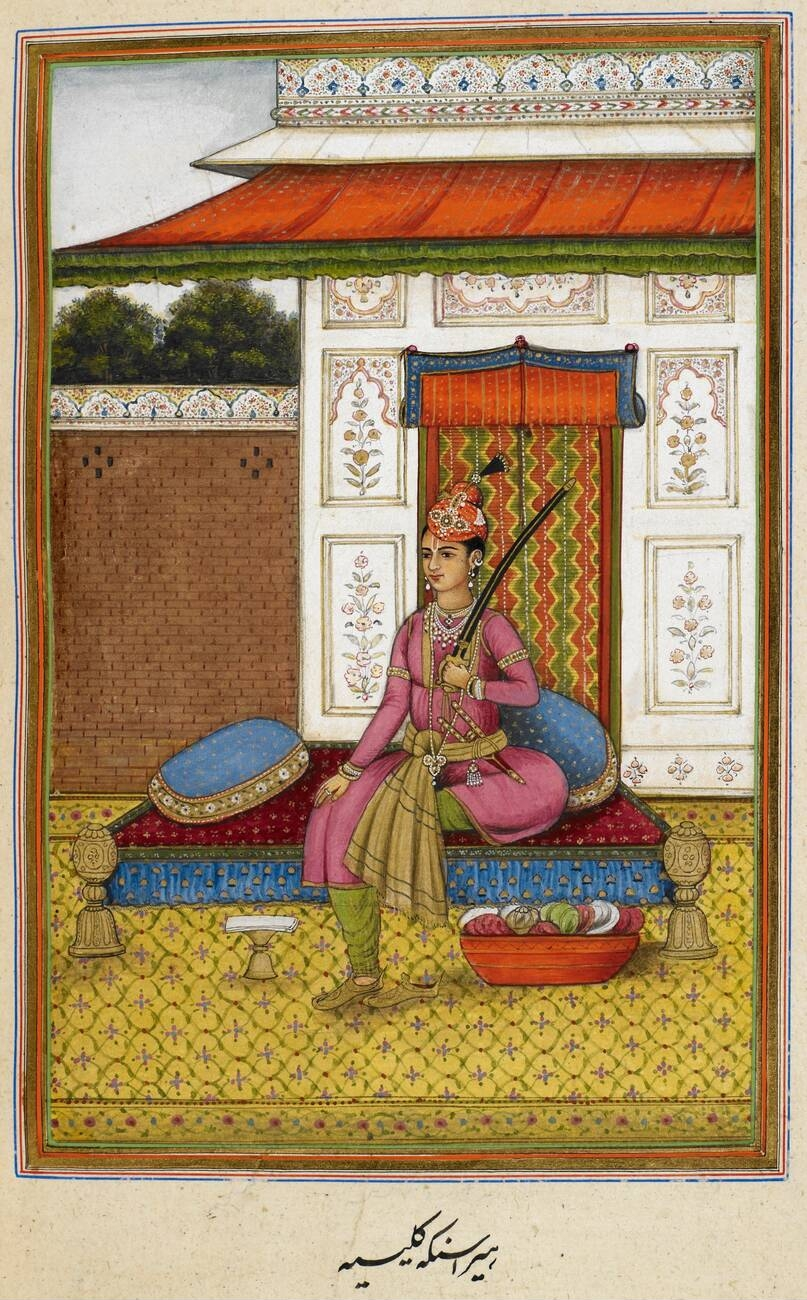
Painting of Hira Singh Kalisiya (Hira Singh of Kalsia State or alternatively spelt as 'Heera Singh of Kalsia State'), from the Tazkirat al-umara, written for Col. James Skinner, ca.1830

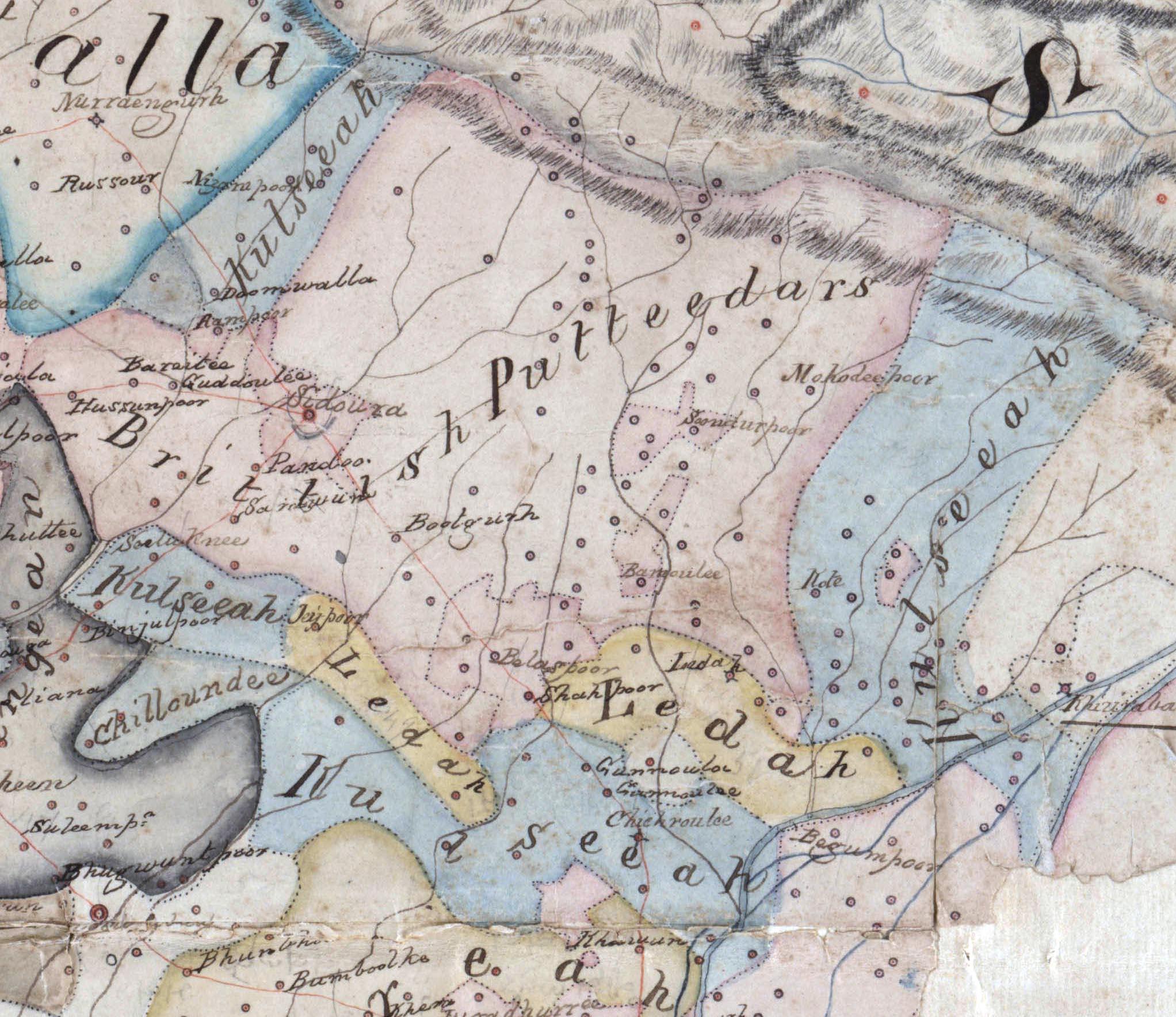
Detail of the main tracts of territory of Kalsia State from a map created by the British East India Company, ca.1829–1835.

Jodh Singh died in Multan in 1818. After his death, his son Sobha Singh assumed charge of Kalsia state and held it until his death in 1858. Lahna Singh, his successor sided with the British in crushing the revolt of 1857.

After 1858, a period of peace started. When Lahna Singh assumed power, the Kalsia territory was intact as a British protectorate. The state's annual income was nearly Rs 300,000 per annum, and the population was around 62,000. After Lahna Singh came Ranjit Singh Kalsia, then the latter's son Ravi Sher Singh, and finally Ravi Karan Singh. Ravi Sher Singh in 1916 gave himself the title of Raja. The Kalsia rajas held their estate until 1947, when it was merged with the Indian Union.

Both Ranjit Singh Kalsia and Ravi Sher Singh built several public utility buildings, including a charity hospital and schools. Raja Ravi Sher Kalsia Hospital was inaugurated in 1910 by Lt Governor of the Punjab, Sir Luis William Daney. The old court building still exists at Chhachhrauli. The dewan of the state used to live in a building known as ‘Janak Niwas’. The Kalsias were undoubtedly staunch Nanakpanthis.

In volume XIX (Part 1) of the Census of India 1891, E. D. Maclagan, the Provincial Superintendent of Census Operation, records: "Some eighty years ago (i.e., in 1811 AD) the grandfather of the present Lambardar of Jainpur village was carried off by the Sikh chief of Kalsia, and had all his fingers burnt off, because he refused to acknowledge that Nanak was the true Guru."

The state was under the political control of the commissioner of the Delhi division. Kalsi is a gotra of the Dhiman and Ramgarhia castes.

Ravisher Singh of Kalsia was the first ruler of Indian to purchase an aeroplane for himself. He flew his aircraft at a speed of 161 kph (100 mph).

== Demographics ==
Religious groups in Kalsia State (British Punjab province era)
Religious group	1881		1891		1901		1911		1921		1931		1941	
Religious group	Pop.	%	Pop.	%	Pop.	%	Pop.	%	Pop.	%	Pop.	%	Pop.	%
Hinduism (Note: 1931-1941: Including Ad-Dharmis)	41,636	61.49%	40,099	58.43%	38,626	57.5%	30,640	54.8%	28,769	50.15%	28,832	48.18%	29,866	44.32%
Islam	19,930	29.44%	20,979	30.57%	21,921	32.63%	18,820	33.66%	20,394	35.55%	21,797	36.42%	25,049	37.17%
Sikhism	5,923	8.75%	7,340	10.69%	6,453	9.61%	6,258	11.19%	8,014	13.97%	9,035	15.1%	12,235	18.15%
Jainism	218	0.32%	212	0.31%	181	0.27%	160	0.29%	190	0.33%	162	0.27%	188	0.28%
Christianity	1	0%	3	0%	0	0%	31	0.06%	4	0.01%	22	0.04%	55	0.08%
Zoroastrianism	0	0%	0	0%	0	0%	0	0%	0	0%	0	0%	0	0%
Buddhism	0	0%	0	0%	0	0%	0	0%	0	0%	0	0%	0	0%
Judaism	—N/a	—N/a	0	0%	0	0%	0	0%	0	0%	0	0%	0	0%
Others	0	0%	0	0%	0	0%	0	0%	0	0%	0	0%	0	0%
Total population	67,708	100%	68,633	100%	67,181	100%	55,909	100%	57,371	100%	59,848	100%	67,393	100%
Note: British Punjab province era district borders are not an exact match in the present-day due to various bifurcations to district borders — which since created new districts — throughout the historic Punjab Province region during the post-independence era that have taken into account population increases.

== List of rulers ==
The rulers of Kalsia State bore the title of 'Sardar', and 1916 they adopted the title of 'Raja', including the last head of the state.

No.	Name (Birth–Death)	Portrait	Reign	Ref.
Sardars
1	Gurbakhsh Singh (died 1785)		1763 – 1785	
2	Jodh Singh (1751 – 1818)		1785 – 1818	
3	Sobha Singh (died 1858)		1818 – 14 February 1858	
4	Lahna Singh (died 1869)		1858 – 19 February 1869	
5	Bishen Singh (1854 – 1883)		1869 – 10 July 1883	
6	Jagjit Singh (1880 – 1886)		1883 – 1886	
7	Ranjit Singh (1881 – 1908)		28 August 1886 – 1908	
8	Ravisher Singh (1902 – 1947)		25 July 1908 – 1916	
Rajas
–	Ravisher Singh (1902 – 1947)		1916 – 1947	

== See also ==
- Cis-Sutlej States
- Political integration of India
