= Amadalpur =

Village in Haryana, India

Coordinates: 30.135°N 77.365°E

Amadalpur village is a part of tehsil Jagadhri of district Yamunanagar, situated in Haryana, India.

== Population ==
The latest available information as per Census 2011 showed that a total of 2975 people stayed in the village consisting of 1564 males and 1411 females. 562 families were staying in this villages as per the latest census. The number of children (age 0–6 years) is 446. The sex ratio was determined to be 902 whereas child sex ratio was 939, both higher than respective Haryana's ratios of 902 and 834.

== Literacy ==
This village reported to have a literacy rate of 66.47%, with literacy of males at 75.55% and female literacy at 57.66%: as per census 2011 data.

== Places of interest ==
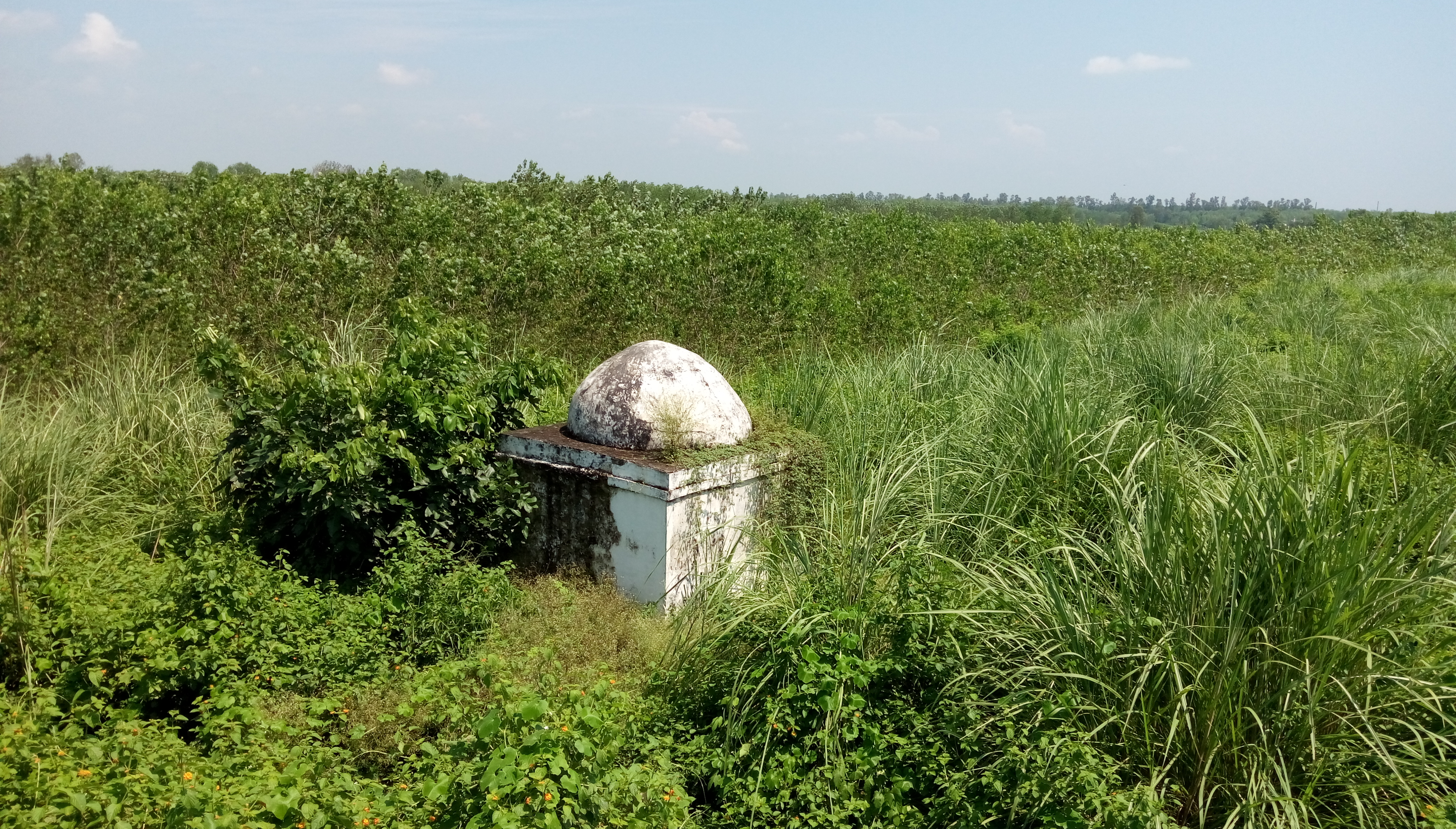
Ancient Mound site, Sugh

It is believed that the ancient Suryamandir Tirth, a sun temple of surya on the banks of a pond, was built in one night by Pandavas of Mahabharata during their Vanvas. There is a kund (sacred water pond) in this temple complex which used to change colour in past but now its water is polluted. According to local belief there is a tunnel in this temple that opens in Pataleshwar Mandir in Buria.

Sugh Ancient Mound, Chaneti Buddhist Stupa, Buria, and Chhachhrauli are historic Archaeological and religious sites in a close geographical cluster. Kapal Mochan, Adi Badri, Hathni Kund Barrage, Sugh Ancient Mound, Kalesar National Park, and Ch. Devi Lal Herbal Nature Park are nearby attractions.
