= Buddhist pilgrimage sites =

The most important places in Buddhism are located in the Indo-Gangetic Plain of southern Nepal, northern and eastern India. This is the area where Gautama Buddha was born, lived, and taught, and the main sites connected to his life are now important places of pilgrimage for both Buddhists and Hindus. Many countries that are or were predominantly Buddhist have shrines and places which can be visited as a pilgrimage.

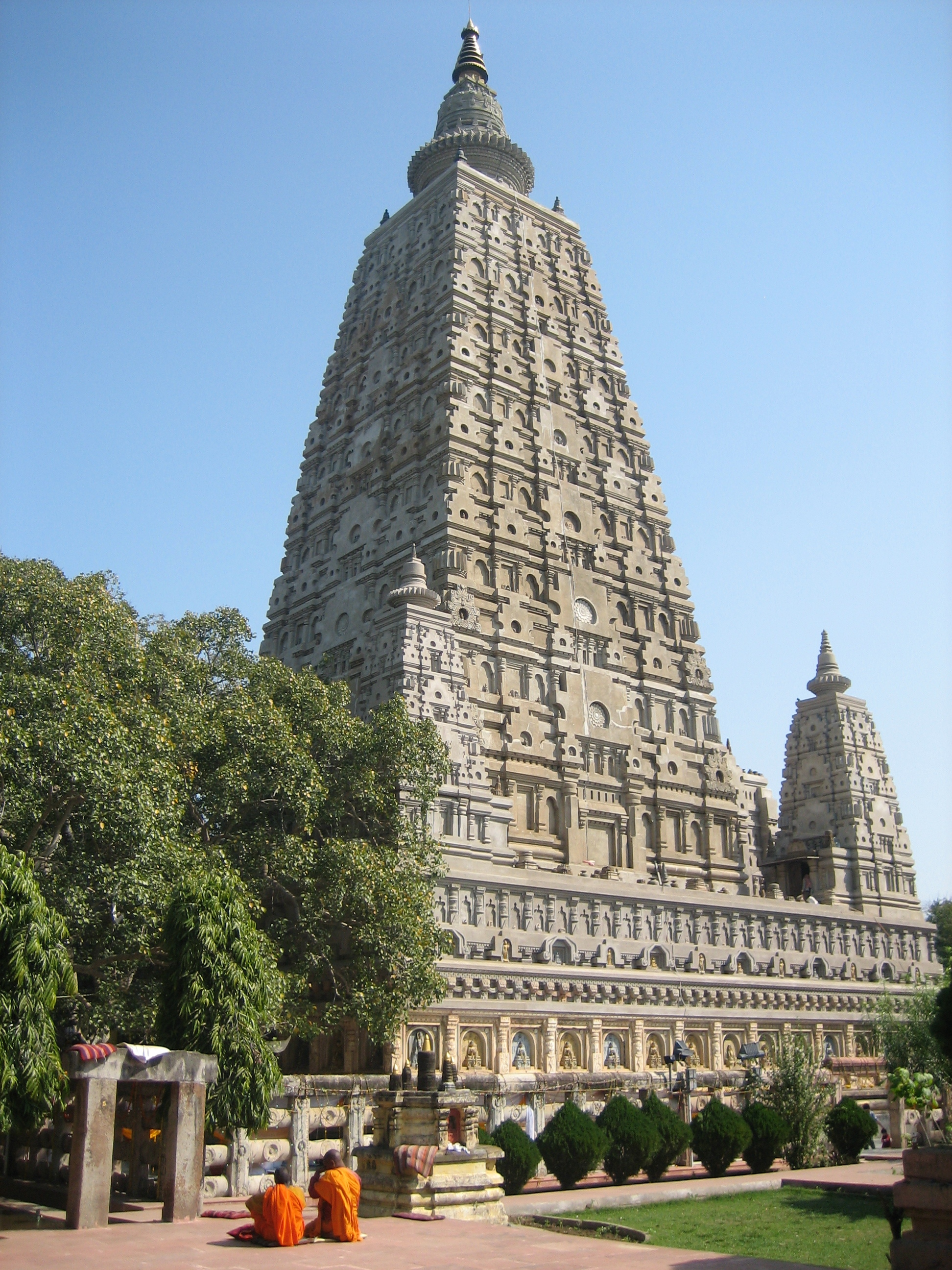
Mahabodhi Temple

== Sites associated with Buddha's life ==
=== Four main pilgrimage sites listed by Buddha himself ===
Gautama Buddha himself had identified the following four sites most worthy of pilgrimage for his followers, observing that these would produce a feeling of spiritual urgency:

- Bodh Gaya: (in the current Mahabodhi Temple, Bihar, India), is the most important religious site and place of pilgrimage for buddhists around the world, the Mahabodhi Temple houses what is believed to be a direct descendant of the Bodhi Tree where Prince Siddhārtha attained enlightenment (Nibbana) and became known as Gautama Buddha.
- Lumbini: birthplace of The Buddha as Prince Siddhartha Gautam (in Taulihawa, Lumbini, Nepal) is an important religious site and place of pilgrimages for Buddhism. It is also approved by UNESCO for World Heritage sites as a holy place for Buddhism and world religions.
- Sarnath: (formally Isipathana, Uttar Pradesh, India) where Gautama Buddha delivered his first sermon (Dhammacakkappavattana Sutta), and He taught about the Middle Way, the Four Noble Truths and Noble Eightfold Path.
- Kuśinagara: (now Kushinagar, Uttar Pradesh, India) where Gautama Buddha died and attained Parinirvana.

=== The Eight Great Places of pilgrimage ===
In addition to the four sites mentioned earlier (Lumbini, Bodh Gaya, Sarnath and Kushinagar), the Buddhist texts later written by Buddha's followers also mention four more sacred sites where a certain miraculous event is reported to have occurred, thus completing the list of "Attha-mahathanani" (Pali for "The Eight Great Places") in India:

- Rajgir: Place of the subduing of Nalagiri, the angry elephant, through friendliness. Rajgir was another major city of ancient India, with Nalanda nearby (14 km), a major center of Mahayana Buddhist learning.
- Vaishali: Place of receiving an offering of honey from a monkey. Vaishali was the capital of the Vajjian Republic of ancient India.
- Sravasti: Place of the Twin Miracle, showing his supernatural abilities in performance of miracles. Sravasti is also the place where Buddha spent the largest amount of time, being a major city in ancient India.
- Sankassa: Place of the descending to earth from Tavatimsa heaven (after a stay of 3 months teaching his mother the Abhidhamma).

The Eight Great Places in Buddhism (Four Great Places are plotted in red.)

=== Other sites related to Buddha's travels ===
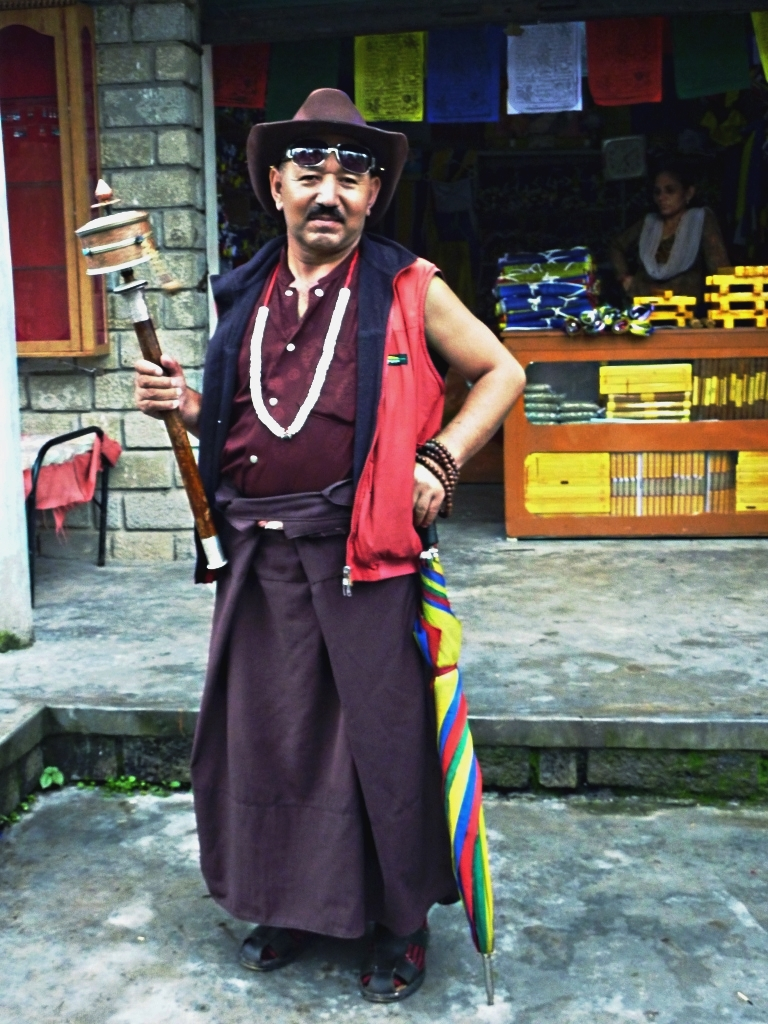
Tibetan pilgrim, Rewalsar Lake, Himachal Pradesh

Some other pilgrimage places in India and Nepal connected to the life of Gautama Buddha are mostly located in the Gangetic plain.

==== Alphabetically by states ====
- Andhra Pradesh: Amaravati, Nagarjuna Konda
- Bihar: Gaya, Kesariya, Nalanda, Vaishali, Pataliputta, Vikramshila
- Haryana (in the order of travel by Buddha): Kamashpura Aastha Pugdal Pagoda (Kumashpur, place where Buddha delivered the Mahasatipatthana sutta),. Kurukshetra Stupa, Topra, Srughna (Sugh Stupa) and Chaneti Stupa were all visited by the Buddha where he gave discourse after visiting Mathura he travelled along Grand Trunk Road in Haryana (also see Buddhist pilgrimage sites in Haryana).
- Madhya Pradesh: Sanchi
- Uttar Pradesh: Devadaha, Kosambi, Mathura, Pāvā (Fazilnagar, Varanasi

==== Chronologically by routes ====
In the order of places traveled by Buddha. Please help expand this incomplete list.

- Uttar Pradesh-Haryana travel route of Buddha
  - From Mathura in Uttar Pradesh, Buddha travelled along Grand Trunk Road in Haryana (also see Buddhist pilgrimage sites in Haryana).
  - Kamashpura Aastha Pugdal Pagoda (Kumashpur) in Sonipat city, the place where Buddha delivered the Mahasatipatthana sutta),.
  - Kurukshetra Stupa on the banks of sacred Brahma Sarovar in Kurukshetra city
  - Topra between Kurukshetra and Yamunanagar, now has a large open air museum park housing several replica of Ashoka's edicts including largest Ashoka Chakra in the world
  - Srughna, now known as the Sugh Ancient Mound, on outskirts of Yamunanagar city
  - Chaneti Stupa, on outskirts of Yamunanagar city

== Other pilgrimage places by country ==
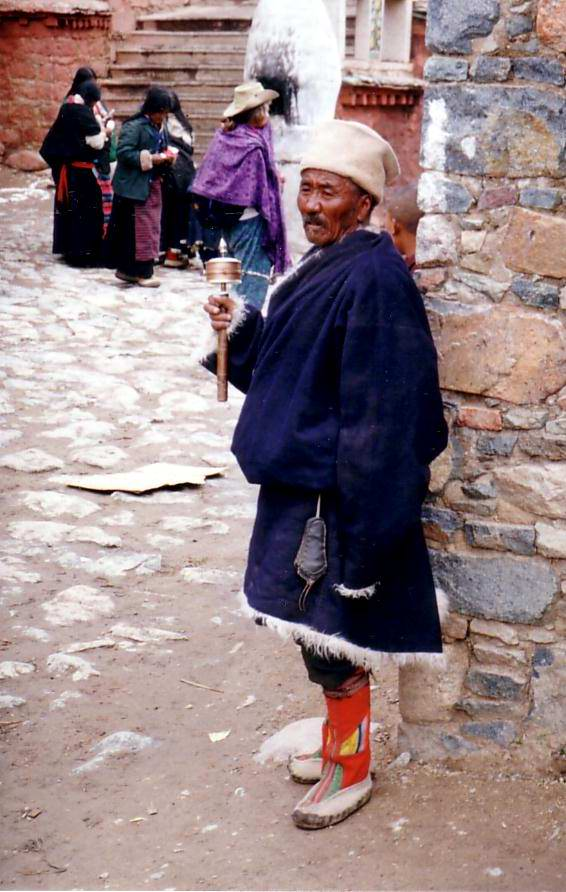
Pilgrims, Tsurphu Gompa, Tibet, 1993

Other famous places for Buddhist pilgrimage in various countries include:

- Bhutan: Paro Taktsang, Kurje Lhakhang, Singye Dzong, Punakha Dzong, Chimi Lhakhang Temple, Jampa Lhakhang, Kyichu Lhakhang, Nabji Lhakhang, Gangtey Monastery, Gomphu Kora, Chagri Dorjeden Monastery, Dzongdrakha Monastery, Phajoding Monastery, Aja Nye
- Cambodia: Wat Botum, Wat Ounalom, Silver Pagoda, Angkor Wat, Angkor Thom
- China: Yungang Grottoes, Longmen Grottoes. The Four Sacred Mountains namely Wǔtái Shān(五台山), Éméi Shān(峨嵋山), Jiǔhuá Shān(九华山).

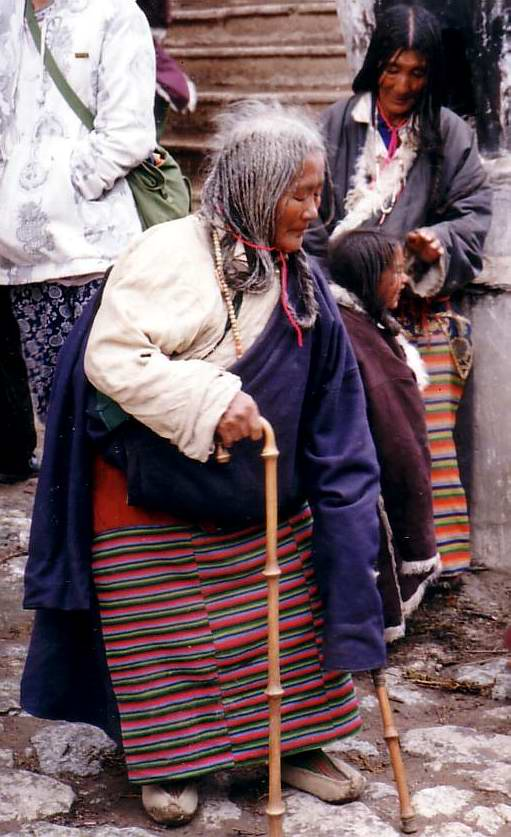
Elderly pilgrim, Tsurphu Gompa, Tibet, 1993

- India: Sanchi, Nalanda, Ellora, Ajanta, also see Buddhist pilgrimage sites in India
- Indonesia: Borobudur, Mendut, Sewu.
- Japan: Kyoto, Nara, Shikoku Pilgrimage, Kansai Kannon Pilgrimage
- Laos: Luang Prabang
- Malaysia: Kek Lok Si, Buddhist Maha Vihara, Brickfields
- Myanmar: Shwedagon Pagoda, Mahamuni Buddha Temple, Kyaiktiyo Pagoda, Bagan, Sagaing Hill, Mandalay Hill
- Mongolia: Erdene Zuu Monastery, Gandantegchinlen Monastery, Zayiin Gegeen Monastery, Amarbayasgalant Khiid, Shankh Monastery
- Nepal: Maya Devi Temple, Boudhanath, Swayambhunath, Kapilavastu
- Pakistan: Gandhara, most notably Taxila and Swat.
- Philippines: Fo Guang Shan
- Sri Lanka: Anuradhapura (the Atamasthana or 'eight places'), Mihintale, Polonnaruwa, the Temple of the Tooth (Kandy), Sri Pada (the Solosmasthana Lewenth places'),
- North Korea: Pohyonsa, Anguksa, Jangansa
- South Korea: Bulguksa, Three Jewel Temples
- Thailand: Wat Phra Kaew, Wat Pho, Wat Doi Suthep, Phra Pathom Chedi, Sukhothai, Ayutthaya, Wat Phra Phutthabat, Wat Phra Thaen Dong Rang (Buddha Death bed), Chedi Phukhao Thong, Phra Pathommachedi
- Tibet བོད: Pǔtuó Shān, Potala Palace, Mount Kailash, Lake Manasarovar, Lake Nam-tso.
- United States of America: City of Ten Thousand Buddhas
- Vietnam: Dâu Pagoda, Hương Pagoda, Mount Yen Tu

== See also ==
- Buddhist pilgrimage sites in India
- Buddhist pilgrimage sites in Nepal
- Shikoku Pilgrimage, Eighty-eight Temples pilgrimage in the Shikoku island, Japan
- Japan 100 Kannon Pilgrimage, pilgrimage circuit that is composed of three independent pilgrimages (Saigoku, Bandō and Chichibu), consist of one hundred Temples.
- Parikrama
- Yatra
