= Phajoding Monastery =

Buddhist monastery in Thimphu, Bhutan

Religion
- Affiliation: Tibetan Buddhism

Location
- Location: Thimphu; 27.4892026°N 89.5723566°E
- Interactive map of Phajoding Monastery

Phajoding Monastery is a Buddhist monastery above Thimphu city in Bhutan founded in the 13th century by Phajo Drugom Zhigpo (1184–1251), a Tibetan lama who spread the Drukpa Kagyu teachings of Buddhism in Bhutan. Most of the buildings at Phajoding however were constructed in 1748 by Gyelwa Shakya Rinchen (1710–1759), the 9th Je Khenpo (rje mkhan po).

It was one of the richest and most decorated monasteries in the country however due to neglect, it was listed in 2010 by the World Monuments Fund as an endangered cultural monument.

With a grant of Nu 200 million from the Government of India, the monastery was restored to former glory from July 2013 to June 2018 through the Phajoding Monastery Conservation Project was implemented by the Division for Conservation of Heritage Sites. Today, the monastery currently houses 80 young monks.
