= Bodh Stupa =

Buddhist monument in Haryana, India

The Bodh Stupa is situated (29° 57′ 46″ N 76° 49′ 15″ E) near the Fine Arts Department in the north-east region of Kurukshetra University, in Haryana, 160 km from Delhi, India.

== History ==
Yuan Chawang, a Chinese pilgrim, visited India. During his time he describes three Buddhist monasteries with more than 700 Hinayanists at Thanesar. The remains of one of those stupas are between Brahma Sarovara and the Kurukshetra University. It is now protected by the Department of Archeological and Museum, Haryana.

== Architecture ==
The height of the mound is around 4 meters from the ground level and surrounding over an area of approximately three acres of land. Five brunt brick structures were recovered during research at the mound. The first three structures belong to the Kushana period, second one related to the Gupta period, and the last ones belong to the Vardhana period and later medieval period. During Harsha period, the compound wall was built. It had support from the outer side and belonged to the structure called Stupa, was built in five phases. The compound wall is 3 meters wide and cleared up to 30meter.

== See also ==
- Buddhist pilgrimage sites in Haryana
- Buddhist pilgrimage sites
- Buddhist pilgrimage sites in India
