= Khajuria, Bihar =

Khajuria
- village
- Nickname: Naya Tola
- Location in Maharashtra, India Khajuria (India)
- Coordinates: 26.3750°N 84.6208°E
- Country: India
- State: Bihar
- District: Bhagalpur
- Tehsil: Colgong

Languages
  - Official: Hindi, Kudmali/Kurmali
- Time zone: UTC+5:30 (IST)
- PIN: 813204
- Nearest city: Bhagalpur

Khajuria is a village in the Sonhaula Block of the Colgong Tehsil of the Bhagalpur District of the Indian state of Bihar State. It is located approximately 42 kilometres (26 mi) west of Bhagalpur, the district headquarters and approximately 265 kilometres (165 mi) from the state capital Patna.

Khajuria's postal head office is Ekchari. Other nearby places in Colgong are Godda, and Naugachhia. The village is near border between the Bhagalpur and Godda districts. It is also near the border between Bihar and Jharkhand.

Maithili, Kudmali/Kurmali and Hindi are spoken here. Khajuria is primarily a farming community. The village is divided into a Hindu and Muslim section. There is one middle school in the village. It is situated near a small river name Chonah.

The closest railway station is approximately 21 kilometres (13 mi) in Ekchari railway station. Other nearby stations are in Kahalgaon and Bhagalpur.

The closest town with road connectivity is Bhagalpur. Ekchari can also be reached by road.
