= Pakari Pakohi =

- Country: India
- District: Bihar

Population
  - Total: 5,582
- Postal Code: 843113

Pakari Pakohi is a village in Muzaffarpur district of the Indian state of Bihar. It lies about 5 km west of Bhagwanpur in the Marwan block.

== Transport ==
The village is connected by a road from Muzaffarpur to Rewa called Rewa road.

The nearest railway station is Muzaffarpur (about 7 km) and the nearest airport is Muzaffarpur Airport (about 1 km).

== Education ==
The village has two primary schools, a middle school, and three madrasahs. Education is available up to 12th standard.

== Culture ==
Major festivals celebrated include Bela, Eid-ul-Fitar, Eid-ul-Adha, Holi, Durga Puja, Diwali, and Chhath.

The Mukhia of the village is Mohammad Faiyaz.

== Demographics ==
Vital Statistics (2001)
Parameters	Total (Rural)	Male	Female
Population	5,582	2,920	2,662
Population Below 6 years	1,109	555	554
Scheduled Caste	947	481	466
Scheduled Tribe	0	0	0
Literate	1,847	1,193	654
Working Population	1,484	1,380	104
Main Working Population	1,313	1,220	93
Marginal Working Population	171	160	11
Non Working Population	4,098	1,540	2,558
Main Working Agricultural Laborer Population	450	427	23
Main Working Cultivator Population	229	221	8
Main Working House Works Population	131	94	37
Main Working Others Population	503	478	25
Marginal Working Agricultural Laborer Population	151	142	9
Marginal Working Cultivator Population	8	8	0
Marginal Working House Works Population	4	2	2
Marginal Working Others Population	8	8	0
