= Bahuara, Vaishali district =

Bahuara
- Gram Panchayat
- Location in Bihar, India Bahuara (India)
- Coordinates: 25°51′13.0″N 85°35′40.7″E
- Country: India
- State: Bihar
- District: vaishali
- Assembly Constituency: Hajipur assembly constituency (AC.123)

Languages
  - Official: Hindi
- Time zone: UTC+5:30 (IST)
- ISO 3166 code: IN-BR

Bahuara is a Gram Panchayat in Hajipur, Vaishali district, Bihar.

== Geography ==
This panchayat is located at 25°51′13.0″N 85°35′40.7″E

== Panchayat office ==
Panchayat Bhawan Bahuara (पंचायत भवन bahuara )

== Nearest major road highway or river ==
NH 103 (National highway 103) is the nearest state highway

== Villages in panchayat ==
There are villages in this panchayat

- Randaha
- Shivganj
- Bahuara
