= Bahuara, Saran district =

Coordinates: 25°54′3.5″N 84°46′31.2″E

Bahuara (Bahuārā) is a Gram panchayat in Marhaura tehsil, Chhapra District, Bihar. Its Panchayat office is the panchayat Bhawan of Bahuara Panchayat (Hindi: पंचायत भवन बहुआरा); the nearest major town is Chhapra, which lies 15 km away.

== Villages ==
The following villages are located in this panchayat:

- Bahuara Patti
- Bind Bahuara
- Repura
- Semal Sarai
- Deo Bah

== Population ==
The following populations were recorded in the 2001 Census:

- Bahuara Patti - 2,922
- Bind Bahuara - 1,682
- Repura - 1,356
- Semal Sarai - 1,083
- Deo Bahuara - 1,600
- Raj Ganwan - 545
