= Pakri, West Champaran =

Pakri
- Village
- Location within Bihar
- Coordinates: 27.108°N 84.464°E
- Country: India
- State: Bihar
- District: West Champaran district

Languages
  - Official: Hindi
- Time zone: UTC+5:30 (IST)
- ISO 3166 code: IN-BR

Pakri is a village in West Champaran district in the Indian state of Bihar.

== Demographics ==
As of the 2011 census of India, Pakri had a population of 4065 in 823 households. Males constitute 51.6% of the population and females 48.3%. Pakri has an average literacy rate of 46.1%, lower than the national average of 74%: male literacy is 61.5%, and female literacy is 38.4%. In Pakri, 21.1% of the population is under 6 years of age.
