= Bilaspur, Haryana =

Bilaspur
- township
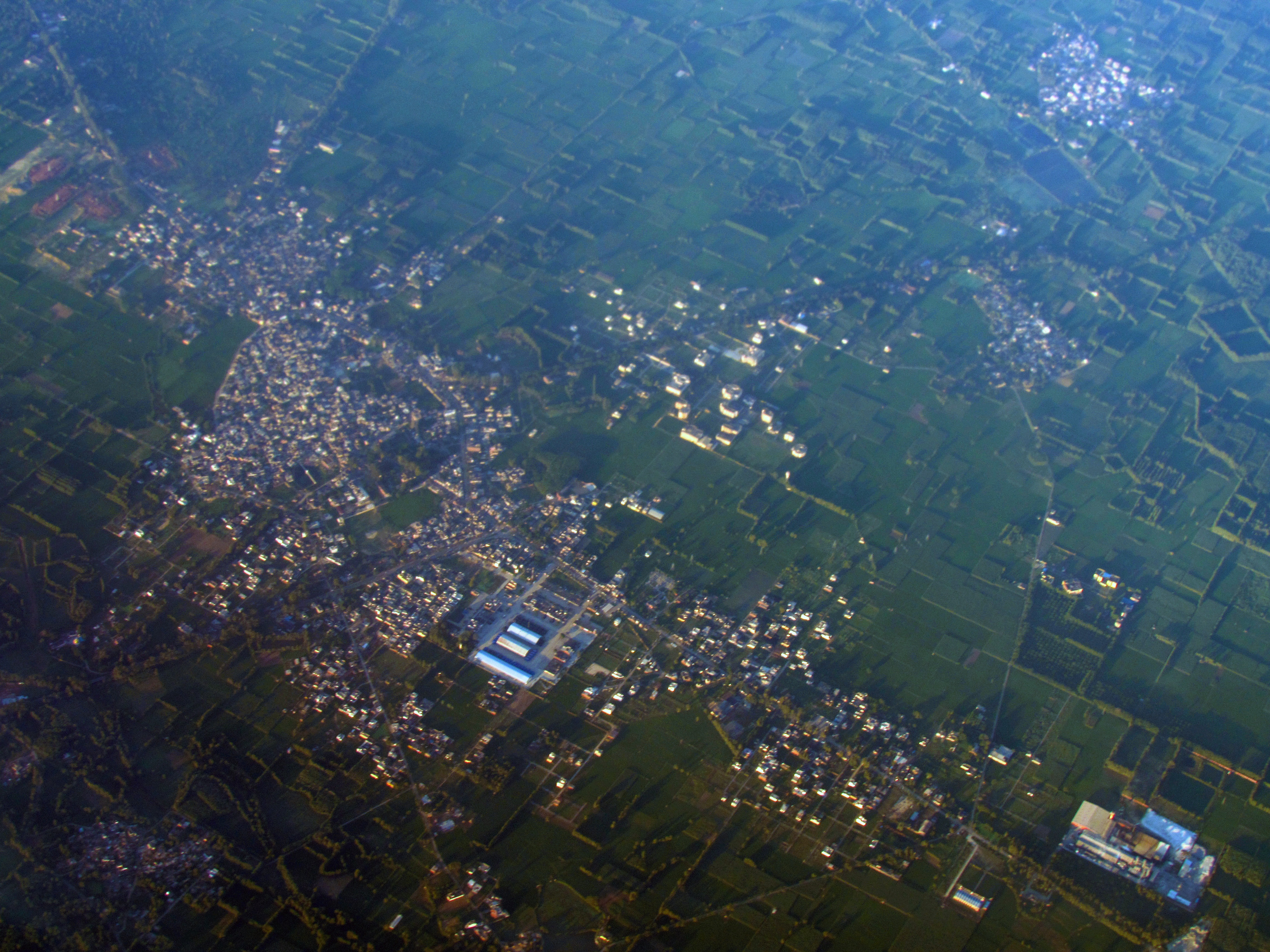
- Aerial view of Bilaspur, Haryana

- Location in Haryana, India Bilaspur (India)
- Coordinates: 30°18′09″N 77°18′05″E
- Country: India
- State: Haryana
- District: Yamunanagar
- Elevation: 274 m (899 ft)

Population (2001)
  - Total: 9,620

Languages
  - Official: Hindi& Haryanvi
- Time zone: UTC+5:30 (IST)
- Postal code: 135102
- ISO 3166 code: IN-HR
- Vehicle registration: HR-71
- Website: haryana.gov.in

Bilaspur is a census town and block headquarter in the Yamunanagar District of the Indian state of Haryana.

== Demographics ==
As of 2001 India census, Bilaspur had a population of 9620. Males constitute 53% of the population and females 47%. Bilaspur has an average literacy rate of 65%, higher than the national average of 59.5%; with male literacy of 69% and female literacy of 61%. 14% of the population is under 6 years of age.

== Riverfont ==
Bilaspur Sarasvati Riverfont is a riverfront that is being developed. In 2021, Haryana Sarasvati Heritage Development Board initiated projects to develop 5 river fronts under the under Sarasvatio Revival Project on the rejuvenated Sarasvati river at Pipli, Pehowa, Bilaspur, Dosarka (on Panchkula-Yamunanagar NH-344 near Sirsgarh) and the Theh Polar (near Sarasvati-Sindhu Civilisation archaeological site on Kaithal-Guhla SH-11). Pipli riverfront will be on the pattern Sabarmati Riverfront.

Bilaspur is one of the important tirtha in the 48 kos parikrama of Kurukshetra.

== See also ==
- 48 kos parikrama of Kurukshetra
- Adi Badri (Haryana)
- Gita Mahotsav
- Kaushalya Dam
- Parikrama
- Lohgarh (Bilaspur)
- Morni
- Sarasvati river
- Sadaura
