= Chaneti Buddhist Stupa =

Buddhist stupa in Haryana, India

Coordinates: 30.166598°N 77.340782°E

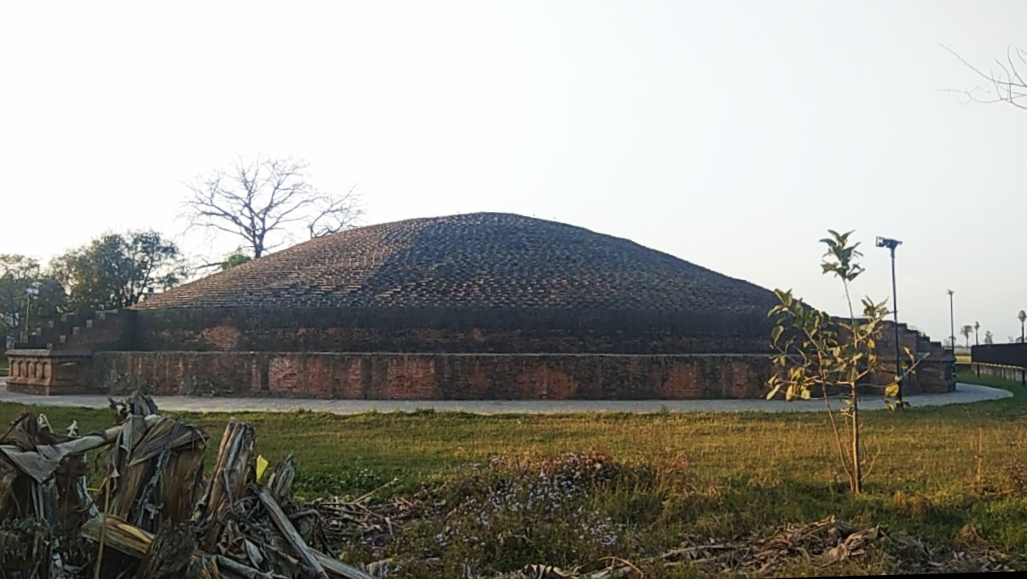
Buddhist stupa of Chaneti.

Location of Chaneti Buddhist Stupa in India.

Chaneti Buddhist Stupa is a 3rd century BC monument protected by the Government of India. The stupa is located in the Yamunanagar district of Haryana, three kilometers east of Jagadhri, and about three kilometers northwest of the archaeological site Sugh. The stupa has been referred by traveller Hiuen Tsang.

== Architecture ==
The stupa is hemispherical, made of baked bricks which are layered on each other in a concentric manner.

== See also ==
- Buddhist pilgrimage sites in Haryana
- Buddhist pilgrimage sites
- Buddhist pilgrimage sites in India
- Amadalpur
