= Adi Badri, Haryana =

Adi Badri Sri Sarasvati Udgam Tirath
- Forest Area, Riverbed
- Location in Haryana, India Adi Badri (India)
- Coordinates: 30.27°N 77.27°E
- Country: India
- State: Haryana
- District: Yamuna Nagar

Languages
  - Official: Hindi
- Time zone: UTC+5:30 (IST)
- Telephone code: 1732
- ISO 3166 code: IN-HR
- Vehicle registration: HR-02
- Website: haryana.gov.in

Adi Badri, also Sri Sarasvati Udgam Tirath, is a tourist site of archaeological, religious and ecological significance in a forest area in the foothills of the Sivalik Hills in Bhabar area, situated in northern part of Yamunanagar district, of the north Indian state of Haryana. There are remains of many Buddhist stupas and monasteries, which are about 1500–2000 years old, and there is also a group of Hindu temples from the 9th century. Based on the multiple archaeological excavations undertaken here, archaeologists have sent the proposal to Archaeological Survey of India (ASI) to include this site in the list of protected heritage site. Several popular annual festivals are held here, including the five day long National Saraswati Festival in January, Adi Badri Akha Teej Mela in Vaisakh around April–May, week-long Adi Badri-Kapal Mochan Kartik Purnima religious mela around November.

Adi Badri, often related to the Saraswati River, is one of the most ancient Vedic religious site in Haryana, along with 48 kos parikrama of Kurukshetra, Dhosi Hill and Kapal Mochan. The Somb river passing through here is considered by some to follow the course of the Rig Vedic Sarasvati river. It lies in the ecosensitive zone of Kalesar National Park. Adi Badri Vatika herbal park developed by the state's forests department also lies here.

Adi Badri Heritage Board was formed by the state govt to develop the area and to revive the sacred Sarasvati river, and also owing to its religious, ecological and tourism significance and potential.

== Location and nearby attractions ==
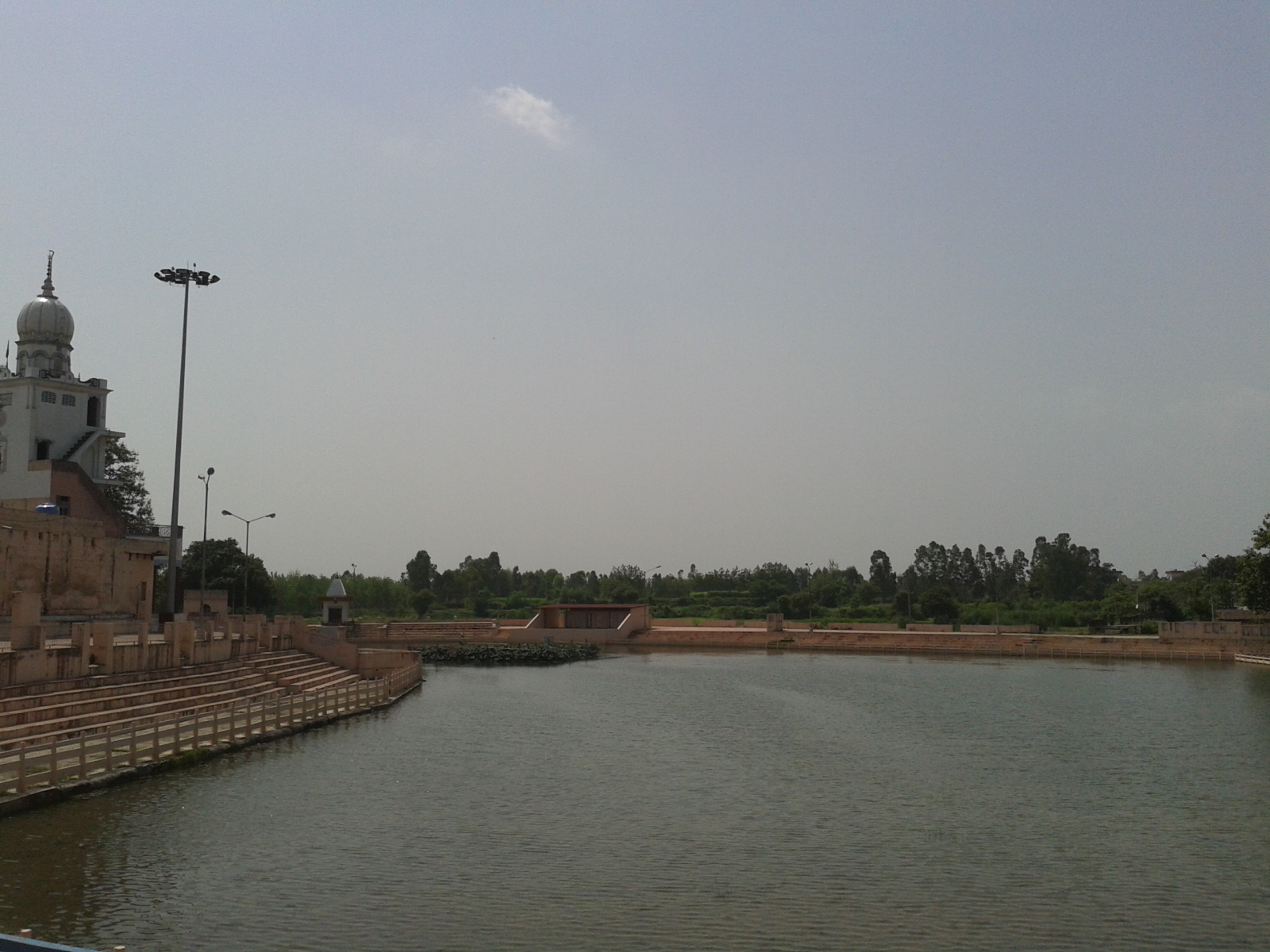
Kapal Mochan Sarovar and Gau-Bacha Temple

Adi Badri can be reached from Jagadhri by a 40 km long all-weather road via Bilaspur, Haryana. The nearest village is Kathgarh, which is situated 2 km southwest from Adi Badri.

Kapal Mochan on Jagadhari road is an ancient place of pilgrimage for both Hindus and Sikhs, 17 km north-east of Jagadhari town, on the Bilaspur road in Yamuna Nagar district.

Nearby Bilaspur, Haryana (not to be confused with Bilaspur, Himachal Pradesh) in Yamuna Nagar District which takes its name from the corrupted form of "Vyas Puri", was the ashram of Ved Vyasa rishi where he wrote the Mahabharta on the banks of Sarasvati river near Adi Badri where Sarasvati river leaves Himalayas and enters the plains.

Lohgarh was established as capital of Sikh empire of Banda Singh Bahadur in 1710.

A Glass Bridge Skywalk is planned here, see also List of Glass Bridge Skywalks in India.

== Archaeological significance ==
ASI has carried out excavations of 3 mounds over 9 years on this 13.5 acres site, with plans for further excavations. ASI has sent the proposal to Ministry of culture in 2013 to notify this as the protected site.

=== Buddhism ===
There are remains of many Buddhist stupas and monasteries near the confluence of rivers Som and Saraswati in Adi Badari. These stupas and monasteries, built of hard bricks, are about 1500–2000 years old.

==== Buddhist Sharirika stupa ====
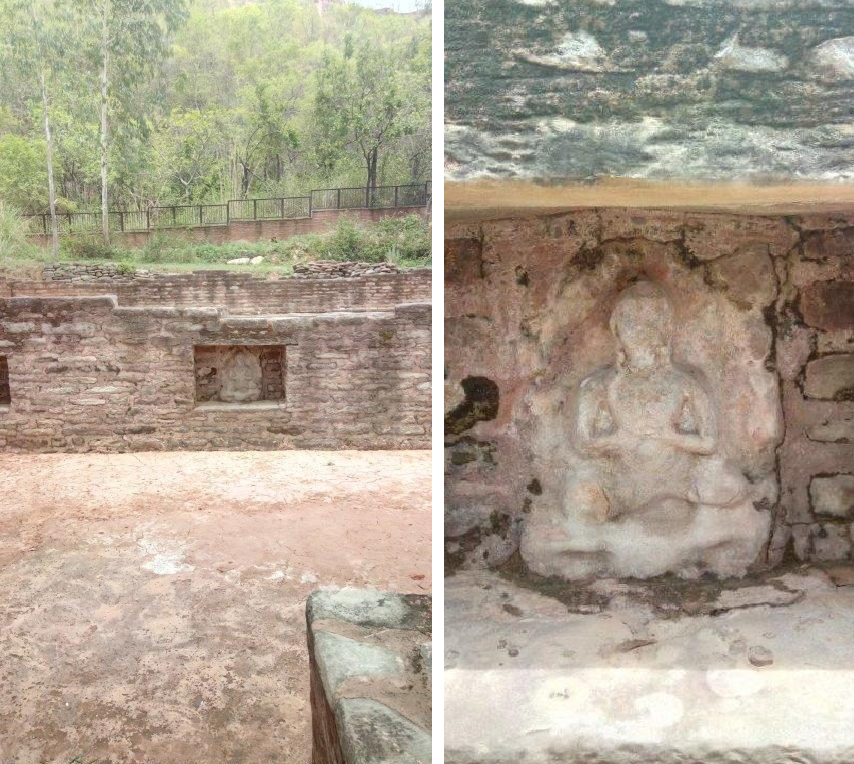
Statues of the Buddha at Adi Badri

The Buddhist Sharirika Stupa, made of burnt bricks, is dated to 3rd century Kushana. During excavations ASI also found pottery of that era, such as bowl, lids, miniature pots, jars, cooking vessels, pitchers, storage jars and stamped wares. Phase I of Period I had bricks measuring (35x20x6 cm, 33x20x5 cm, 30x22x6 cm and 23x25x6 cm) organised in tapering circular manner, and the bottom 23 layers of bricks were unearthed during the 2002-03 excavation.

==== Buddhist monastery ====
Adi Badri Buddhist monastery is dated to 10th-12th century. Few cells, big enough to accommodate one person, and a Buddha statue suggest that this rare ancient monastery was meant for meditation. Buddhist statues from 12th century CE were discovered here.

=== Hindu temples and sculptures ===
Yamuna Nagar Adi Badri is a group of Hindu temples from the 9th century. Excavations by ASI unearthed several ancient sculpture and monuments pertaining to the Vaishnavism, Shiva and Shakti traditions, including late medieval Adi Badri-Narayana temple (Vishnu) built by Adi Shankaracharya on the banks of Somb river, Shakti-Mantra Devi temple (wife of Abhimanyu and daughter of king Virata of Matsya Kingdom during Mahabharta) and Sri Kedarnath Temple (Shiva). Several 9th century CE Hindu statues of Shiva, Parvati and Ganesha were discovered here. Archaeological finds also include lingam, which is estimated by experts to be 4,000 years old. Nearby Kathgarh village is hub of several oral traditions related to the Saraswati Civilization.

== Present-day religious significance ==
According to legends, this is the place where Ved Vyasa wrote Bhagavata Purana, and Pandavas stayed her during the last year of their exile.

Adi Badri has a Sarasvati kund (pond) for the worship of Sarasvati river where evening aarti is held every day. Adi Badri Akha Teej Mela is a large fair that takes place at the Hindu temple complex on the Akshaya Tritiya (Akha Teej) in Vaisakh around April or May. The popular week-long annual Adi Badri-Kapal Mochan Kartik Purnima religious mela is usually held around November. All the main Hindu festivals are also celebrated at the ancient temple complex.

== Sarasvati River revival ==
=== Adi Badri Heritage Board ===
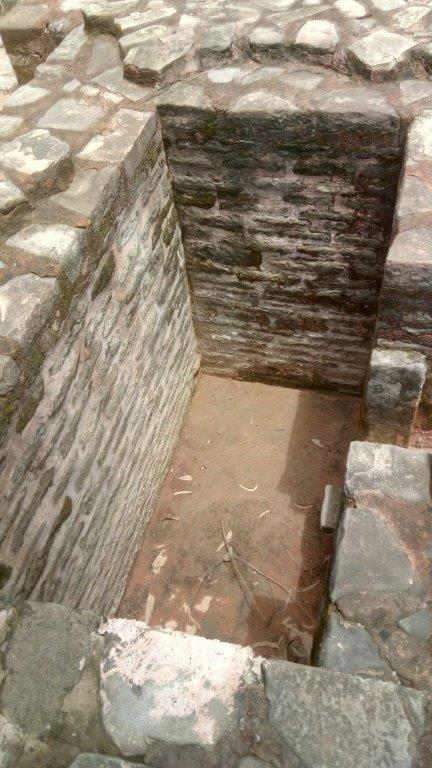
Meditation cell at Adi Badri

The Government of Haryana, headed since 2014 by BJP, announced setting up of the Adi Badri Heritage Board and its plans to revive the sacred Sarasvati river by creating a new water channel along the supposed path of the river. The board has 70 partner organisations, for research on Sarasvati river, including ASI, ISRO, several IITs and Union Government ministries of India.

=== Sarasvati revival ===
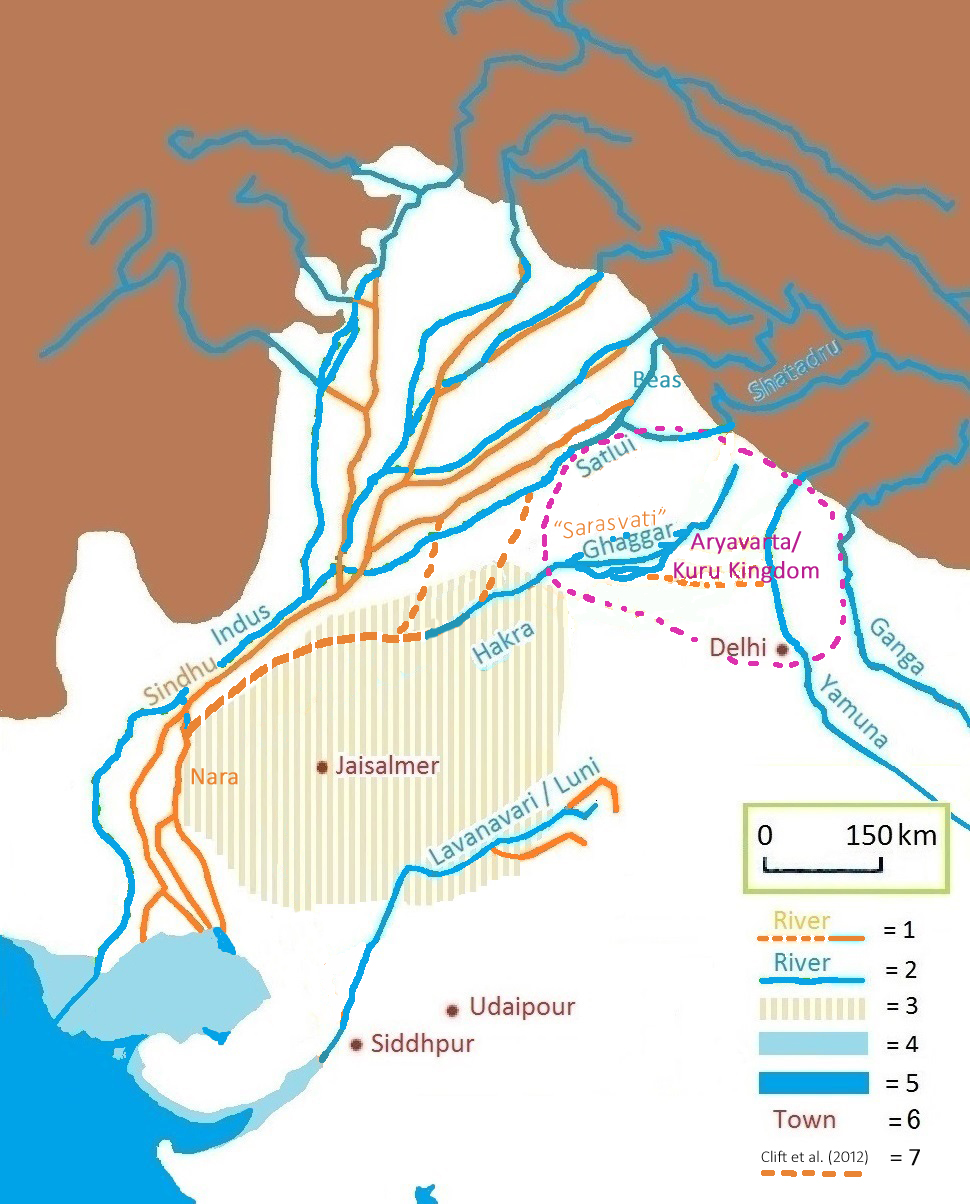
Sarasvati ancient channel.

==== Significance ====
According to a government-constituted expert committee, Saraswati River did exist, originating in the Himalayas, and passing through Haryana. According to committee-member Khadg Singh Valdiya, the committee identified a paleo-channel which is related to the Indus Valley civilisation, and to the present Ghaggar, Sarsuti, Hakra and Nara rivers. Joint efforts by several states en route, from the origin of its initial tributaries in Uttarakhand and Himachal, to its paleodelta in Gujarat with ancient dock at Lothal (one of the southernmost sites of the ancient Indus-Saraswati Valley civilisation with trade links to Mesopotamia and Sumer), via Haryana, Punjab, Rajasthan, are on to map and revive the Rig Vedic flow till Gujarat and build religious tourism and irrigation-cum-flood control facilities along the way. The Sarasvati revival project of Haryana seeks to build channels and dams along the route of the lost river in Haryana, and develop it as a tourist and pilgrimage circuit. Downstream in Rajasthan, one of the paleochannel of the now-lost scared Sarasvati River, which is also the paleochannel of later-era partially-lost Ghaggar River, is now occupied by the Indira Gandhi Canal which why the canal is also known as the Saraswati Rupa Rajasthan Canal.

==== Revival status ====
Haryana Sarasvati Heritage Development Board (HSHDB) established by the Government of Haryana is responsible for the revival of Sarasvati in Haryana. As of 2025, the entire length of 400 km Saraswati in Haryana has been revived in the phase-1 where water flows during the monsoon. In the next phase, dams and barrages are being constructed to make it perennial. In total, 10 small and one big dams are being constructed in the Saraswati river catchment area, and most of these are in varying stages of environmental approval. During fy 2025-26 budget, Haryana granted the administrative approval of Rs 388.16 cr for revival of Saraswati River and construction of Adi Badri Dam to be constructed by HPPCL for which Rs 34.67 cr had been already deposited with Himachal government. Adi Badri Dam has already received the environment clearance, and the forest clearance is awaited. The design of Somb Saraswati Barrage is awaiting final approval from Central Water Commission (CWC), after which it will be constructed by the Irrigation & Water Resources Department (I&WRD) of Haryana. Cost estimates will be revised after the finalisation of design and wildlife approval. By 2025, Haryana had already constructed 15 major reservoirs along Sarasvati's course, including at Bibipur (1000 acre reservoir), Rampur Haria and Rampur Kambian (350 acre), Saraswati Wildlife Sanctuary at Seonsar in Pehowa (70 acre), Sanghor (15 acre), Bohli (12 acre), Kandoli (12 acre), Rampura (7 acre), Marchehri (7 acre), etc to restore rainwater for flood control and irrigation which has raised the groundwater level. Haryana will replicate this model to other rivers also including Somb river, Chautang, Rakshi, Tangri, Markanda, Ghaggar.

Earlier, 212 km channel in Haryana was revived, including 55 km section from Adi Badri to Uncha Chandna, 153 km section from Uncha Chandna to Kaithal and 4 km section from Kaithal to confluence with Ghaggar River in Punjab, from there Ghaggar reenters Haryana and courses through Fatehabad and Sirsa districts up to Ottu barrage. To revive the river, the dried up channel was dug up and dams will be built in the Sivalik Hills at Adi Badri, Haripur and Lohgarh on the Somb river (a tributary of Saraswati) and downstream Senonar barrage (Guldehra). This will help in controlling floods from Somb river, harvesting and conservation of water for irrigation and lake tourism.

To revive the river, the Revenue department had acquired 1,900 acre of land from the farmers on the 12 km paleochannel of the river, which were cleared of encroachment. A 55 km long channel from Adi Badri to Uncha Chandna (up to west of Yamuna Nagar) was dug up and revived under MNREGA. Downstream 153 km channel from Uncha Chandna to Kaithal is already unhindered. The one of the paleochannel of the now-lost scared Sarasvati River, which is also the paleochannel of later-era partially-lost Ghaggar River in Rajasthan, downstream of Haryana, is now occupied by the Indira Gandhi Canal also known as the Saraswati Rupa Rajasthan Canal.

Pilgrimage sites, ghats, and tourist facilities will be developed along the channel to be revived. In 2021, Haryana Sarasvati Heritage Development Board initiated projects to develop 5 river fronts on the rejuvenated Sarasvati river at Pipli, Pehowa, Bilaspur, Dosarka (on Panchkula-Yamunanagar NH-344 near Sirsgarh) and the Theh Polar (near Sarasvati-Sindhu Civilisation archaeological site on Kaithal-Guhla SH-11). Pipli riverfront will be on the pattern Sabarmati Riverfront. Adi Badri is one of the important tirtha in the 48 kos parikrama of Kurukshetra.

=== Related revival activities ===
==== Research nodal agency and research committee ====
The UGC has granted several crore research grant in 2018 to the Centre of excellence for research on Saraswati river at Kurukshetra University. It is Haryana's designated nodal agency for research on Saraswati river. A research fellowship program for the scientific research on Saraswati is established at the university. In 2016, Haryana government constituted a committee of scientists initially for a duration of two 2 years (2016–2018) to conduct the scientific studies. Another interstate co-ordination committee will be formed with Himachal, Uttarakhand, Haryana, Punjab, Rajasthan and Gujarat states that fall in the paleochannel of Saraswati.

==== International Saraswati Festival ====
International Saraswati Festival, also called International Saraswati Mahotsav, is an annual 5-day international-level festival held in the last week of January in honor of Sarasvati River, a manifestation of Hindu goddess Saraswati, believed to enter the plains from the Shivalik Hills here at Adi Badri. It is simultaneously celebrated at multiple locations, including by bringing water from hundreds of rivers across India, hosting events at all government and government-aided schools and colleges as well as several district headquarters across Haryana. Activities include prayers, poetry on Saraswati, and essay writing on scientific and archaeological, geological and ideological aspects of Saraswati heritage. Pilgrimage and river awareness marches are organised from various parts of the state that culminate at Adi Badri. A two-day scientific seminar on Saraswati is also held with participation of scientists from over 20 nations. It is organised by the Haryana Saraswati Heritage Development Board (HSHDB), which is also making efforts since 2015 to restore the Saraswati river channel from Adi Badri to Mustafabad. Annual pilgrimage along the Saraswati route is organised that travels through various ghats on religious tirthas and Indus Valley civilization sites along the banks of Saraswati river.

== See also ==
- Sharada Peeth
- Sharda River
- Sacred mountains of India
- Gangotri
- Yamunotri
- Sarasvotri, origin of Sarasvati River
- Tourism in Haryana
- List of National Parks & Wildlife Sanctuaries of Haryana
