= List of State Protected Monuments in Haryana =

This is a list of State Protected Monuments as officially reported by and available through the website of the Archaeological Survey of India in the Indian state Haryana. The monument identifier is a combination of the abbreviation of the subdivision of the list (state, ASI circle) and the numbering as published on the website of the ASI. 23 State Protected Monuments have been recognized by the ASI in Haryana. Besides the State Protected Monuments, also the Monuments of National Importance in this state might be relevant.

== List of state protected monuments ==
SL. No.	Description	Location	Address	District	Coordinates	Image
S-HR-1	Khwaja Khizr Tomb	Sonipat	in Sonipat	Sonipat district		Khwaja Khizr Tomb
S-HR-2	Ancient Mound (Bhirrana)	Bhirrana village		Fatehabad district		Upload Photo
S-HR-3	Ancient Mound (Kunal)	Kunal village		Fatehabad district		Upload Photo
S-HR-4	Shishmahal	Farrukhnagar	inside Farrukhnagar Fort	Gurgaon district		Shishmahal
S-HR-5	Dehra Temple	Bhond village on National Highway 248 (India), 2 km west of Ferozepur Jhirka	On the foothill on the west side of village	Nuh district		Upload Photo
S-HR-6	Dargah Hazrat Sheikh Musa (Jhoolti Minar)	Village Palla, Nuh, Mewat	near "Mewat engineering college" at Nuh-Taoru road.	Nuh district		Upload Photo
S-HR-7	Pranpir Badshah tomb (Ancient Gombaj)	Hissar	next to "Panchayat Bhawan" & Govt College near Mahabir Stadium	Hisar district		Upload Photo
S-HR-8	Char Qutub Dargah	Hansi	inside Asigarh Fort at Hansi city	Hisar district		Upload Photo
S-HR-9	Jahaj Kothi	Hisar	inside Firoz Shah Palace Complex in Hisar city	Hisar district		Upload Photo
S-HR-10	Tomb of Sheikh Tayyab	Kaithal	near railway line in Kaithal city	Kaithal district		Tomb of Sheikh Tayyab
S-HR-11	Karnal Mughal Bridge	Karnal city	Mughal Bridge is 8km from Karnal city center	Karnal district		Upload Photo
S-HR-12	Ancient Shiva Temple	Thanesar		Kurukshetra district		Ancient Shiva Temple
S-HR-13	Harsh Ka tilla	Kurukshetra	Also called Harsh Ka tilla, next to Shekh Cheli's Tomb	Kurukshetra district		Harsh Ka tilla
S-HR-14	Mosque of Pir Turkman and Tomb	Narnaul		Mahendragarh district		Upload Photo
S-HR-15	Tripolia Gateway	Narnaul				Upload Photo
S-HR-16	Tomb of Shah Nizam	Narnaul		Mahendragarh district		Upload Photo
S-HR-17	Chor Gombaj	Narnaul		Mahendragarh district		Upload Photo
S-HR-18	Shobha Sagar Talab	Narnaul		Mahendragarh district		Upload Photo
S-HR-19	Chatta Rai Bal Mukund Das	Narnaul		Mahendragarh district		Chatta Rai Bal Mukund Das
S-HR-20	Throne of Mirza Ali Jaan and Baoli	Narnaul	Narnaul	Mahendragarh district		Upload Photo
S-HR-21	Bhima Devi Temple Complex	Pinjore	next to Pinjore Gardens	Panchkula district		Bhima Devi Temple Complex
S-HR-22	Takiya Banwa Fakir	Panchkula		Panchkula district		Upload Photo
S-HR-23	Sugh Ancient Mound (Sugh)	Jagadhari	between Amadalpur & Dayalgarh village in Jagadhari	Yamunanagar district		Sugh Ancient Mound (Sugh)
S-HR-24	Chaneti Buddhist Stupa	Chaneti	Chaneti, Jagadhri	Yamunanagar district		Upload Photo

== See also ==
- Tosham rock inscription
- List of Monuments of National Importance in Haryana
- List of Indus Valley Civilization sites
- List of National Parks & Wildlife Sanctuaries of Haryana, India
- Haryana Tourism
