= Dhanauri, Kaithal =

Dhanauri
- Village
- Location in Haryana, India Dhanauri (India)
- Coordinates: 29°47′N 76°11′E
- Country: India
- State: Haryana (Code 06)

Population (2011)
  - Total: 11,929

Languages
  - Official: Haryanvi, Hindi
- Time zone: UTC+5:30 (IST)
- PIN: 126116 / 136027
- Area code: 126116 / 136027
- Literacy: 95%
- Lok Sabha constituency: Sirsa

Dhanauri is a village in Kaithal district in the Indian state of Haryana. It is located approximately 150 kilometers from Chandigarh City and 185 Kilometers from Delhi.This village is linked to Narwana, Tohana, Kalayat, Kaithal, Khanouri by road and is situated at the Punjab–Haryana border. It is an agricultural community with many temples. The people of village are religious and live in empathy to each other. Writer and poet Harikesh Patwari was born in Dhanauri. It is the village of Famous kabaddi player Tita Dhanouri.

== Demographics ==
In 2021, 99% of the village's population are Hindu. Else 1% of the population are follower of some other religions. Nearly 25000 population And around 9000 voters.

== Agriculture ==
The village has a farming based culture. Village have nearly 7000 acre cultivable land in total. Majority of the people do farming for their livings. They grow a variety of crops. Two major grown crops are weat and rice. They also rare domestic animals like buffalo, cows, etc.

== Education ==
The village has one girl's college name Baba Khair Nath Girls College and two government higher senior secondary schools: one for boys and one for girls, Deen Bandhu Sir Chotu Ram senior secondary school pvt. Many students from nearby villages come to Dhanauri to study. SIIT Computer & Tution Centre with Library is the First and oldest Technical Education Center situated at Main Bus Stand Dhanauri, And many students go out for study due to lack of english medium schools.

== Shrines ==
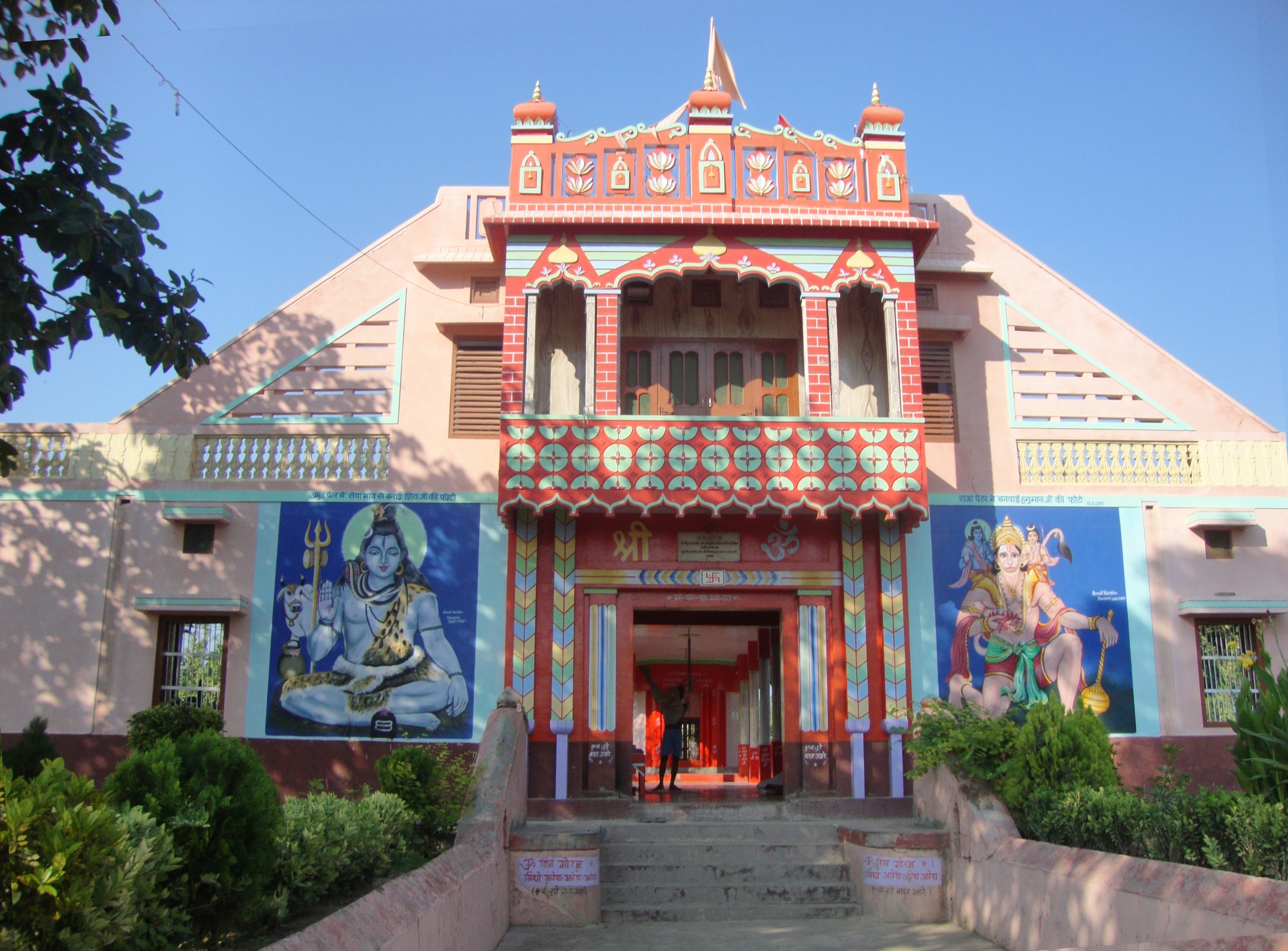
Samadhi mandir of Baba Khar Nath in Dhanauri

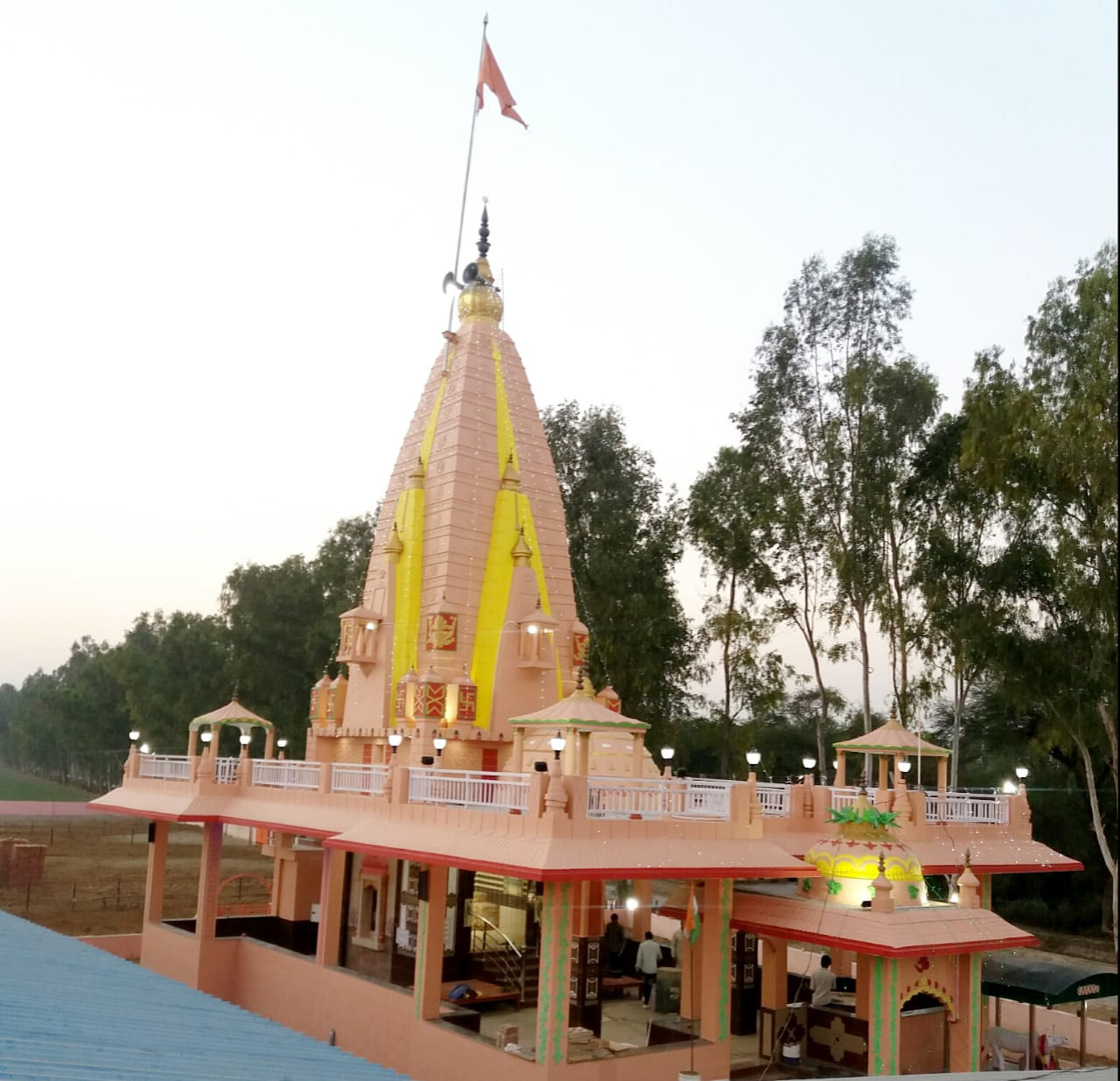
Shree Krishan Mandir

Baba Khar Nath temple is a shrine that was built over the Samadhi of Baba Khar Nath. It was established in 1922 to carry out the blessings of Shri Baba Khar Nath. Shri Prabhu Nath arrived at the village in 1860 and remained there until his liberation in 1918.

In 2014, the Dhanauri village started to build a safe place for Cows in the aura of Sant Baba Moni Ji Maharaj, named as "Adrash Gausala and Gorakhsha Dal" and completed it in 2015. It was completed by contributions of villagers and sants like Gopal das ji and more.

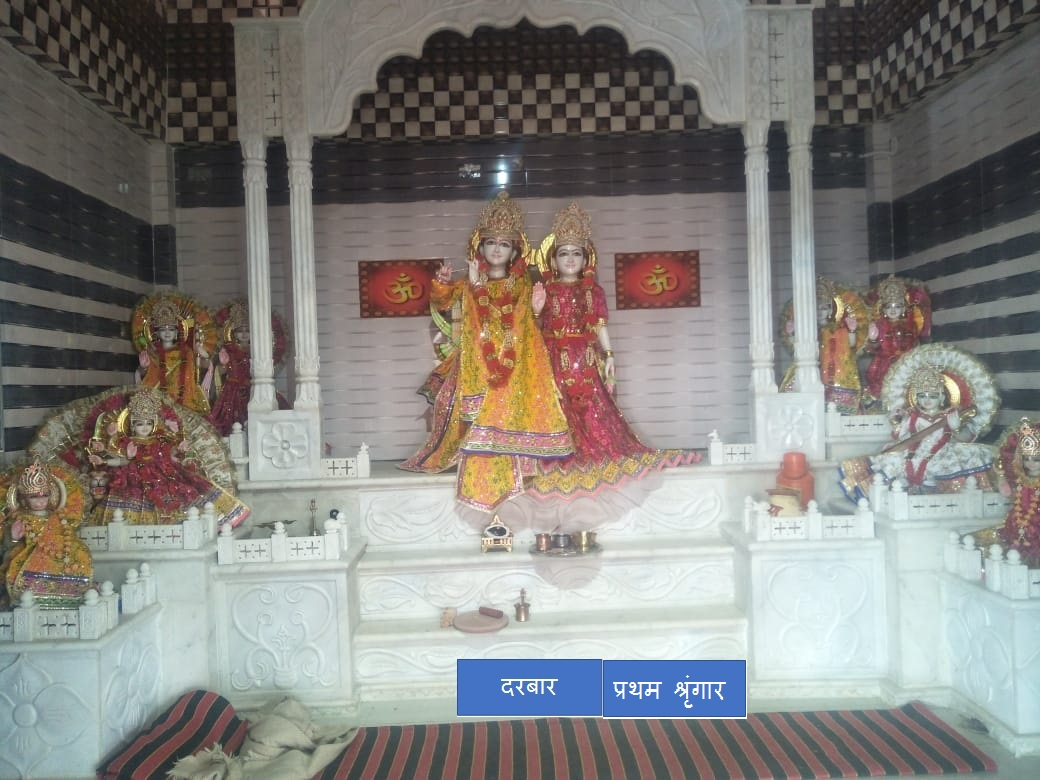
राधा कृष्ण

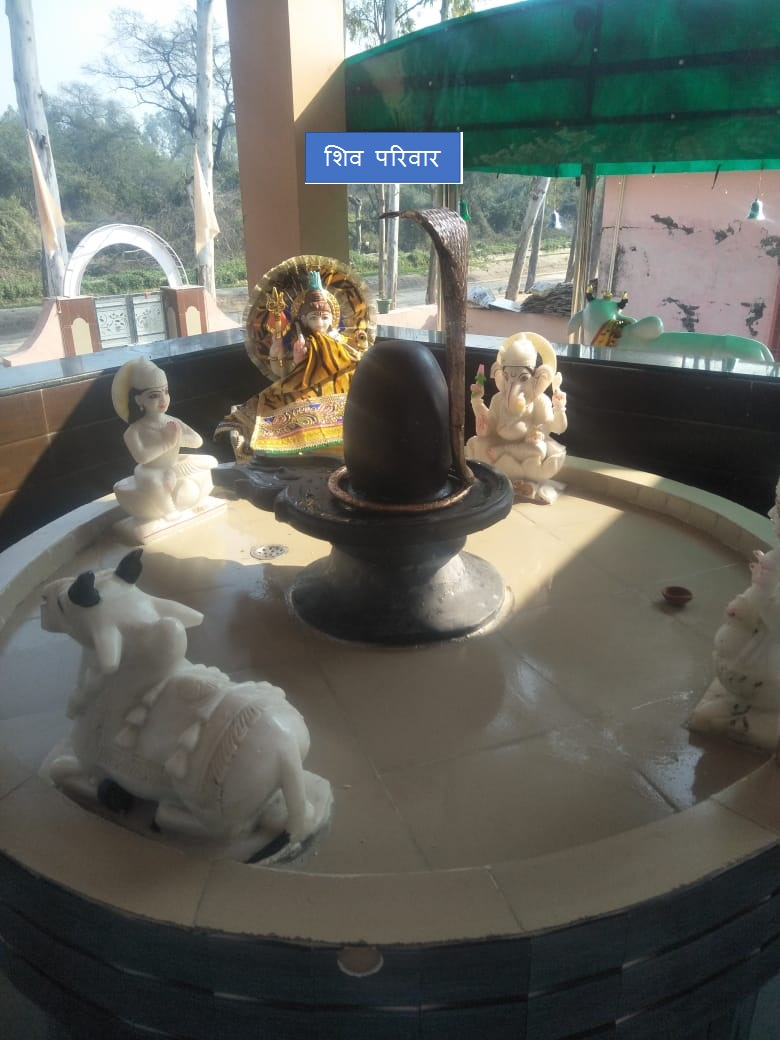
शिव परिवार

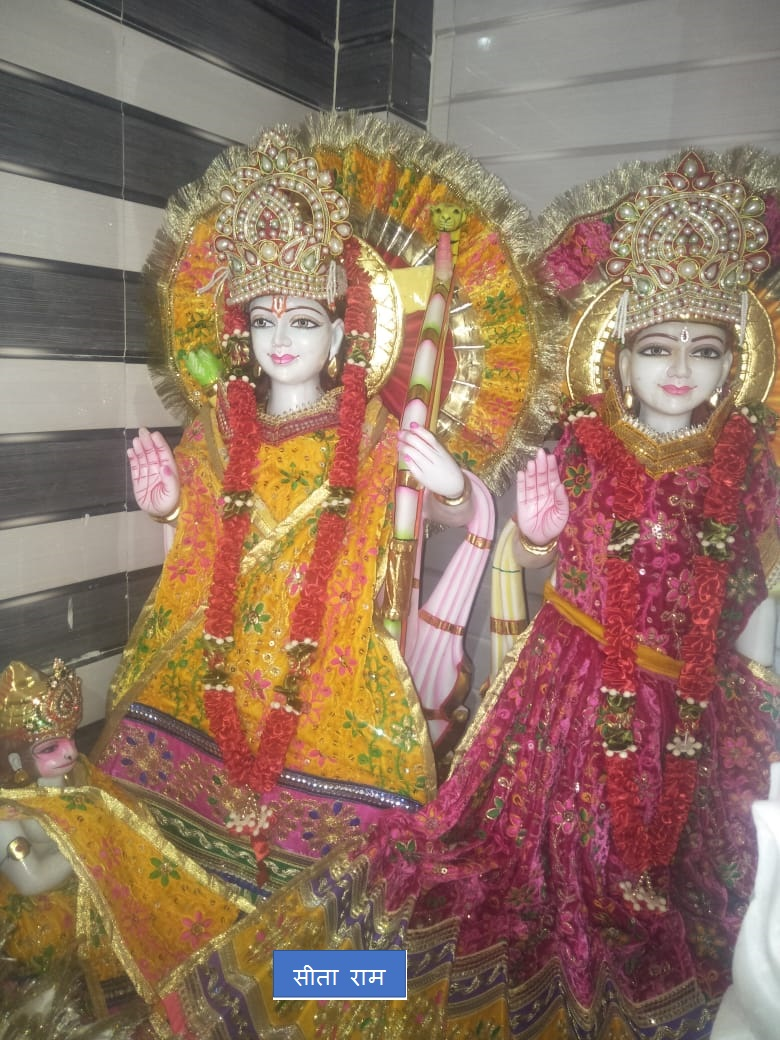
सीता राम

"Shree Krishan Mandir" is situated in “Gaushala” its construction started in 2016, which was completed in February 2019, and dedicated to "Adrash Gausala and Gorakhsha Dal, Dhanauri".

There are many other Temple situated in the village like:- Mata Sherawali Mandir, Shiv Mandir (Shivalya), Hanuman ji Mandir, Dhanna Bhagat Mandir (2 Temples, One on each side of the village), Basanti Mata, Fulumde Mata Mandir, Guru Gorakh nath ji mandir, jahar vir Gogga Mandir, Anchal Puri Mandir, Santoshi Mata mandir, kali mata mandir, vishvakarma mandir, Aasan mandir, Giri temple, etc.

== Environment and wildlife ==
East side of the village is covered with rain water drain called 'kalasi' home for the monkeys. East and west side of village have huge ponds with a little plantation. Duck, indian Sparrow, crow, bees, saras, frogs, and many more other wildlife nearly extinct due to loss of habitat and careless deeds of the people.

== Public Facilities ==
Health centre, veterinary centre, Grain mandi, 2 powerhouse, 2 khel stadiums, nearby 16 Dharmshala, Post office, Punjab National Bank and ATM, State Bank of India and The Jind Central Co-operative Bank Limited, 3 petrol stations pvt. 4 tobacco and hookah stores. The Mega Bazar, 2 Oil Mills
