= Songal, Kaithal =

Songal
- village
- Location in Haryana, India Songal (India)
- Coordinates: 29.676176°N 76.466663°E
- Country: India
- State: Haryana
- District: Kaithal district
- Named for: Vansh Kaushik

Government
  - Type: Local government
  - Body: Panchayat

Area
  - Total: 14.66 km^{2} (5.66 sq mi)
- Elevation: 231 m (758 ft)

Population (2011)
  - Total: 6,079
  - Density: 414.7/km^{2} (1,074/sq mi)

Languages
  - Official: Hindi
- Time zone: UTC+5:30 (IST)
- PIN: 136027
- Telephone code: 01746
- Vehicle registration: HR-08
- Literacy: 63.50% (total); 73.78% (male); 51.07% (female)
- Sex ratio: 847 ♂/♀

Songal village is located in Kaithal Tehsil of Kaithal district in Haryana, India. It is situated 18 kilometres (11 mi) away from Kaithal, which is both district & sub-district headquarter of Songal village. As per 2009 stats, Songal village is also a gram panchayat.

== Demographics ==
Most of the population of the village is Hindu and widely spoken language is Haryanvi.

== Schools ==
- Govt. Sr. Secondary School.

== Transportation ==
The nearby Railway stations to Songal village are New Kaithal Halt Railway station (NKLE) and Kaithal Railway station (KLE).

From Kaithal bus stand, bus services are also available to Delhi, Hisar, Chandigarh, Jammu and many other places. For Inter-state travel HR buses are also available from nearby town Rajound.
