= Sega, Kaithal =

Sega Segga
- village
- Location in Haryana, India Sega (India)
- Coordinates: 29°45′18.7704″N 76°28′5.4984″E
- Country: India
- State: Haryana
- District: Kaithal district

Government
  - Type: Local government
  - Body: Panchayat

Area
  - Total: 7.97 km^{2} (3.08 sq mi)
- Elevation: 237 m (778 ft)

Population (2011)
  - Total: 3,241
  - Density: 407/km^{2} (1,050/sq mi)

Languages
  - Official: Hindi
- Time zone: UTC+5:30 (IST)
- PIN: 136027
- Telephone code: 01746
- Vehicle registration: HR-08
- Literacy: 62.05% (total); 73.03% (male); 49.31% (female)
- Sex ratio: 847 ♂/♀
- Post Office: Narar

Sega, also known as Segga, (Hindi: [seːɡa]) village is located in Kaithal tehsil of Kaithal district in Haryana, India. It is situated 9 kilometres (5.6 mi) from Kaithal, which is district and sub-district headquarters of Sega village. As of 2009, Sega village is also a gram panchayat.

== Demographics ==
Most of the population of the village is Hindu; the widely spoken language is Haryanvi.

Demography of Sega Village - 2011 census
Category	Percent
Male Population	54.15%
Female Population	45.85%
Average Literacy	62.05%
Male Literacy of total literates	73.03%
Female Literacy of total literates	49.31%
Population below 6 years of age	13.08%

== Schools ==
- Govt. Sr. Secondary School, Sega
- Saraswati Public School

== Transportation ==
The nearby railway stations to Sega village are New Kaithal Halt railway station (NKLE), Kaithal railway station (KLE) and Geong railway station (GXG).

From Kaithal bus stand, bus services are also available to destinations including Delhi, Hisar, Chandigarh, and Jammu.
