= Manoj Kumar (boxer) =

Indian boxer (born 1986)

Personal information
- Full name: Manoj Kumar Kaltagdia
- Nationality: Indian
- Citizenship: Indian
- Born: Rajound, Kaithal, Haryana
- Height: 172 cm (5 ft 8 in)

Sport
- Sport: Amateur boxing
- Coached by: Rajesh Kumar
Medal record
Representing India
Commonwealth Games
Gold medal – first place	2010 Delhi	Light welterweight
Bronze medal – third place	2018 Gold Coast	Welterweight
Asian Championships
Bronze medal – third place	2007 Ulaanbaatar	Light welterweight
Bronze medal – third place	2013 Amman	Light welterweight
Grand Prix Czech Boxing Championship
Gold medal – first place	2017	Light welterweight
Doha International Tournament
Gold medal – first place	2015	Light welterweight
South Asian Games
Gold medal – first place	2016 Guwahati	Light welterweight
Czech Grand Prix
Bronze medal – third place	2009	Light welterweight

Manoj Kumar is an Indian boxer who won a gold medal in the light welterweight division at the 2010 Commonwealth Games. He hails from the village of Rajound in the Kaithal district of Haryana.

== Early life and debut in boxing ==
Kumar was born on 10 December 1986 in Rajound village, 30 km from Kaithal, Haryana and comes from a Ror family. His father Sher Singh retired from the Indian Army, while his mother is a housewife. Manoj Kumar initially started his career as an athlete, while his elder brother Rajesh Kumar Rajound was an emerging boxer. When Rajesh Kumar Rajound won gold in the university championship he was expecting to be selected for the national team. However he was ignored, and therefore decided to bring his younger brother into boxing. He started to coach Manoj Kumar and also insisted his younger brother Mukesh Kumar change from judo to boxing to become a sparring partner of Manoj Kumar. All three travelled from their village Rajound to Kaithal to train. In the early days they trained with the help of old bicycle tubes.

Manoj Kumar became national Champion for the first time when he beat defending champion Som Bahadur Pun in 2008. After that Manoj never looked back. He won the gold medal at the 2010 Commonwealth Games.

== Career ==
=== Commonwealth Games 2010 ===
- Won against D Lassayo (Sierra Leone)
- Won against G Gaasite (Botswana)
- Won against B Mathenge of Kenya in the quarters
- Won 3–1 against V Knowles of Bahamas in a low scoring semifinal
- Won 11–2 against Bradley Saunders of England in the final and became champion.

=== 2011 World Amateur Boxing Championships ===
Kumar reached the quarterfinals, losing 18–24 to Tom Stalker, at the 2011 World Amateur Boxing Championships in Baku, Azerbaijan. Earlier in the competition, Kumar had defeated Valentino Knowles of Bahamas 17–11, Ray Moylette of Ireland 19–7 and Hu Qing of China 17–15. This last victory against Hu Qing had sealed his qualification for the 2012 Olympic Games.

=== London Olympics 2012 ===
Manoj won the first round against Serdar Hudayberdiyev of Turkmenistan by a score of 13–7 and advanced to the last 16. But he lost his pre-quarterfinal bout against world #1 ranked Tom Stalker of Great Britain. The final score read 20–16, the break-up being 7–4, 9–5, 4–7 in the favour of Stalker. Expressing disapproval at the second round scoring, Manoj cited "blatant cheating" as the reason for his defeat as he exited the competition.

=== 2014 Commonwealth Games ===
At the 2014 Commonwealth Games he reached the quarterfinals before losing to Sam Maxwell.

=== 2016 South Asian Games ===
In 2016 South Asian Games held in Guwahati, Manoj Kumar wins gold medal in his weight category.

=== 2018 India Open International Boxing Tournament ===
In 2018, India Open International Boxing Tournament held in Delhi, Manoj Kumar wins bronze medal in his weight category.

== Awards ==
He was awarded Arjuna Award by Government of India in 2014. Initially he was not considered for Arjuna Award by the selection committee headed by former Indian Cricket Team Captain Kapil Dev. However, his coach Rajesh Kumar Rajound file a case against the selection committee on 26 August 2014 in Delhi High Court. Rajesh claimed that Manoj was the most deserving sports person for the Arjuna Award and that the selection committee ignored him. Delhi High Court accepted his petition and after seeing all the facts directed the government to honour Manoj Kumar with the "Arjuna Award".

He won the bronze at Commonwealth Games 2018.
