= Deod Kheri =

Deod Kheri Dhodh Kheri
- village
- Location in Haryana, India Deod Kheri (India)
- Coordinates: 29.774514°N 76.440614°E
- Country: India
- State: Haryana
- District: Kaithal district

Government
  - Type: Local government
  - Body: Panchayat

Area
  - Total: 5.50 km^{2} (2.12 sq mi)
- Elevation: 237 m (778 ft)

Population (2011)
  - Total: 1,962
  - Density: 357/km^{2} (924/sq mi)

Languages
  - Official: Hindi
- Time zone: UTC+5:30 (IST)
- PIN: 136027
- Telephone code: 01746
- Vehicle registration: HR-08
- Literacy: 62.46% (total); 72.47% (male); 51.00% (female)
- Sex ratio: 834 ♂/♀

Deod Kheri village is located in Kaithal Tehsil of Kaithal district in Haryana, India. It is situated 3 kilometres (1.9 mi) away from Kaithal, which is both district & sub-district headquarter of Deod Kheri village. As per 2009 stats, Deod Kheri village is also a gram panchayat.

== Demographics ==
Most of the population of the village is Hindu and widely spoken language is Haryanvi.

== Schools ==
- Govt. Secondary Sechool.

== Transportation ==
The nearby Railway stations to Deod Kheri village are New Kaithal Halt Railway station (NKLE) and Kaithal Railway station (KLE).

From Kaithal bus stand, bus services are also available to Delhi, Hisar, Chandigarh, Jammu and many other places.
