= Sisla Sismore =

- village
- Location in Haryana, India Sisla Sismore (India)
- Coordinates: 29.710638°N 76.485065°E
- Country: India
- State: Haryana
- District: Kaithal district

Government
  - Type: Local government
  - Body: Panchayat

Area
  - Total: 13.06 km^{2} (5.04 sq mi)
- Elevation: 237 m (778 ft)

Population (2011)
  - Total: 6,406
  - Density: 490.5/km^{2} (1,270/sq mi)

Languages
  - Official: Hindi
- Time zone: UTC+5:30 (IST)
- PIN: 136043
- Telephone code: 01746
- Vehicle registration: HR-08
- Literacy: 66.91% (total); 77.57% (male); 54.44% (female)
- Sex ratio: 856 ♂/♀

Sisla Sismore village is located in Kaithal Tehsil of Kaithal district in Haryana, India. It is situated 14 kilometres (8.7 mi) away from Kaithal, which is both district & sub-district headquarter of Sisla Sismore village. As per 2009 stats, Sisla Sismore village is also a gram panchayat. Sh.Sant Lal Gupta is a native of Sisla Sismore.

== Demographics ==
Most of the population of the village is Hindu and widely spoken language is Haryanvi.

== Schools ==
- Govt. Sr. Secondary School.
- Sainik Public School.
- SBS International School.

== Transportation ==
The nearby Railway stations to Sisla Sismore village are New Kaithal Halt Railway station (NKLE) and Kaithal Railway station (KLE).

From Kaithal bus stand, bus services are also available to Delhi, Hisar, Chandigarh, Jammu and many other places.
