= Kalayat Ancient Bricks Temple Complex =

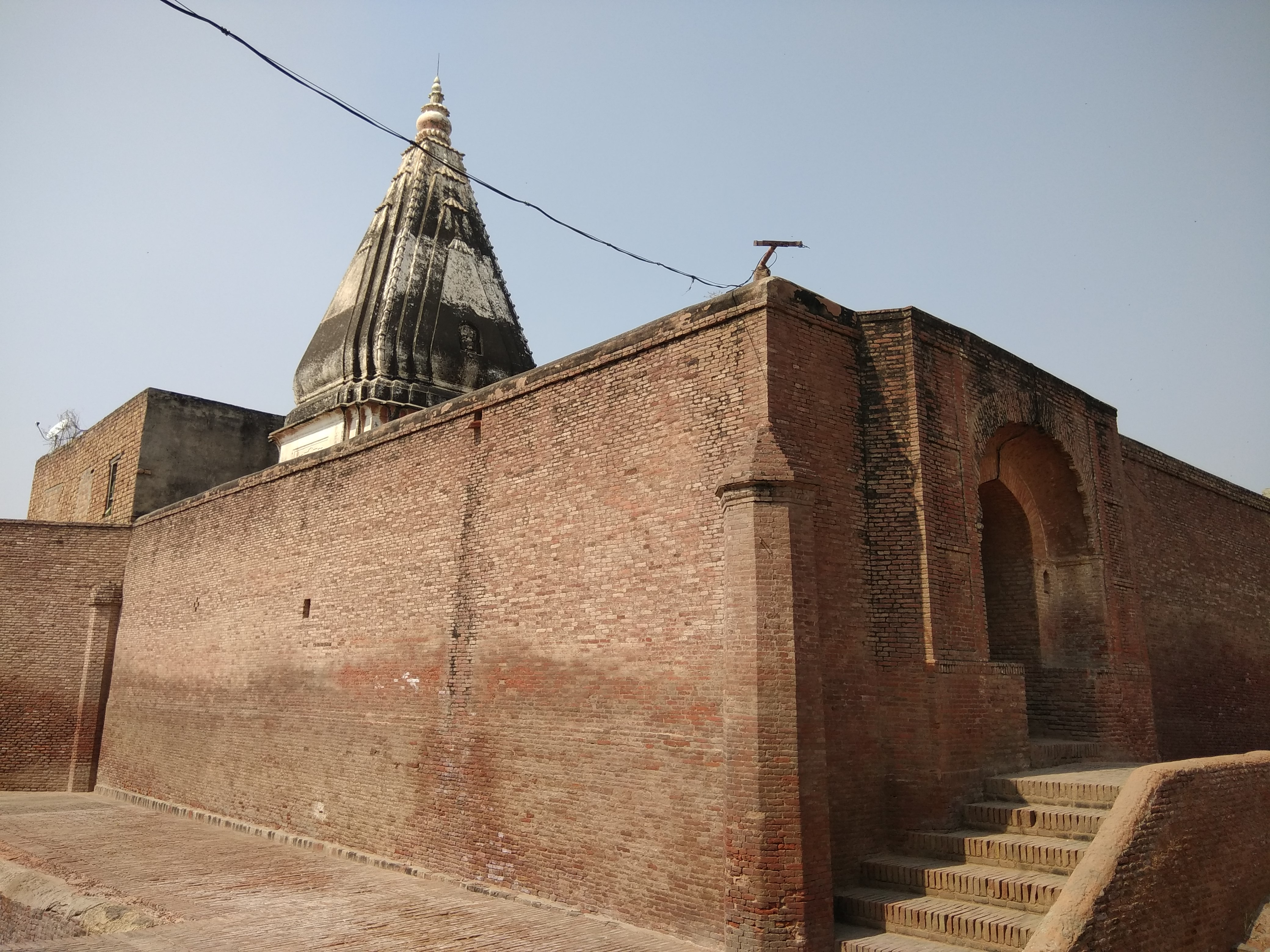

- Location in Haryana Kalayat Ancient Bricks Temple Complex (India)

Religion
- Affiliation: Hinduism
- Deity: Hinduism, Shiva, Katyayini

Location
- Location: Kalayat
- State: Haryana
- Country: India
- Interactive map of Kalayat Ancient Bricks Temple Complex
- Coordinates: 29°40′28″N 76°15′17″E

Architecture
- Type: Gurjara Pratihara Style
- Completed: 8th century

Specifications
- Temple: 3
- Monument: 2

The Kalayat Ancient Brick Temple Complex is a ruined brick temple complex north of Delhi, is located in Kalayat town in Kaithal district of the state of Haryana, India. It comprises the several Hindu temples, including two ancient temples dating from the 8th century. This temple constitutes an important point in the series of 48 kos parikrama of Kurukshetra. Tradition avers that the temples are associated with the Shalivahana (Raja Sálbán).

== History ==
The name Kalayat appears to be derived from "Kapilayatana", which translates to the "home of sage Kapila". According to local legends, in ancient times, five brick temples were located beside the holy tank. However, only two temples now survive. These temples are built in the Gurjara-Pratihara style, and can be dated to 8th century CE. One of the two surviving temples has undergone heavy modifications.

== Temple complex ==
The temples were built in Nagara style of Gurjara-Pratihara School. The layout of the temples indicates there were originally five temples in the Panchayatan group on the banks of holy Kapilayatna Tirtha (water tank). In the Panchayatan the main shrine was surrounded by four subsidiary shrines, which is contemporaneous to the temples of Khajuraho and Bhubaneshwar. Locally made red bricks were the main source of material for the buildings and sculptures. They were built without using any plaster or mortar. Only two temples survive. One temple is a Shiva temple in the Pancha Rathas style with a Linga statue and snake statue. Temples have a square-shaped shrine of the carved bricks joined without any mortar. The bricks in the sikhara are joined to form beehive patterns similar to the facade of the rock-cut chaitya hall of Ajanta or Ellora. This style of sculpting evolved from the Gupta (4-6th century CE) and post-Gupta architecture.

There are stairs at the back leading to the Kapil Muni Tirtha comples, where pilgrims take a bath before worship, The pond is named Chyavan Giri Kund after another Vedic sage Chyavana who regained health and youth by consuming Chyawanprash (made by RajVaidhya twin Ashwini Kumar brothers) at his Ashram on Dhosi Hill near Nuh in Mewat district.

There is also a temple of Katyayini devi who was the daughter of Sanskrit grammarian, mathematician and Vedic Sage Kātyāyana.

There is also a Hanuman temple and Akhara.

== Access ==
Kalayat, where the temple complex is located, is connected by road. Rail and air links are available in the nearby major cities such as Chandigarh and Delhi.

Its distance from other major cities is as follows: kaithal 30 km, Jind 52 km, Kurukshetra 77 km, Hisar 90 km, Fatehabad 90 km, Panipat 95 km, Sirsa 133 km, Chandigarh 150 km, Ludhiana 159 km, Delhi 193 km, Dehradun 222 km, Shimla 250 km, Amritsar 287 km, Dharamshala 368 km, Agra 393 km and Khajuraho 820 km.
