= Peoda =

- village
- Location in Haryana, India Peoda (India)
- Coordinates: 29°44′51.3132″N 76°25′6.672″E
- Country: India
- State: Haryana
- District: Kaithal district

Government
  - Type: Local government
  - Body: Panchayat

Area
  - Total: 10.42 km^{2} (4.02 sq mi)
- Elevation: 237 m (778 ft)

Population (2011)
  - Total: 5,018
  - Density: 481.6/km^{2} (1,247/sq mi)

Languages
  - Official: Hindi
- Time zone: UTC+5:30 (IST)
- PIN: 136027
- Telephone code: 01746
- Vehicle registration: HR-08
- Literacy: 65.94% (total); 77.24% (male); 53.05% (female)
- Sex ratio: 869 ♂/♀

Peoda village is located in Kaithal Tehsil of Kaithal district in Haryana, India. It is situated 8 kilometres (5.0 mi) away from Kaithal, which is both district & sub-district headquarter of Peoda village. As per constitution of India and Panchyati Raaj Act, Peoda village is administrated by Sarpanch (Head of Village) who is elected representative of village.

== Demographics ==
Most of the population of the village is Hindu and widely spoken language is Haryanvi.

== Schools ==
- Govt. Sr. Secondary Sechool.
- Govt. Primary school

== Transportation ==
The nearby Railway stations to Peoda village are New Kaithal Halt Railway station (NKLE) and Kaithal Railway station (KLE).

From Kaithal bus stand, bus services are also available to Delhi, Hisar, Chandigarh, Jammu and many other places.
