= Kakaut =

Kakaut Kakot
- village
- Location in Haryana, India Kakaut (India)
- Coordinates: 29.756906°N 76.494644°E
- Country: India
- State: Haryana
- District: Kaithal district

Government
  - Type: Local government
  - Body: Panchayat

Area
  - Total: 13.34 km^{2} (5.15 sq mi)
- Elevation: 237 m (778 ft)

Population (2011)
  - Total: 6,018
  - Density: 451.1/km^{2} (1,168/sq mi)

Languages
  - Official: Hindi
- Time zone: UTC+5:30 (IST)
- PIN: 136043
- Telephone code: 01746
- Vehicle registration: HR-08
- Literacy: 66.48% (total); 76.43% (male); 54.29% (female)
- Sex ratio: 808 ♂/♀

Kakaut (or Kakot) village is located in Kaithal Tehsil of Kaithal district in Haryana, India. It is situated 9 kilometres (5.6 mi) away from Kaithal, which is both district & sub-district headquarter of Kakaut village. As per 2009 stats, Kakaut village is also a gram panchayat.

== Demographics ==
Most of the population of the village is हिन्दू GURJAR and widely spoken language is Haryanvi.

== Schools ==
- Govt. Sr. Secondary Sechool.
- Saraswati Sr. Sec. School.
- Mout Litera Zee School.
- SAINIK SR. SECONDARY SCHOOL.
- SUN RISE PUBLIC SCHOOL.
- GREEN VALLEY PUBLIC SCHOOL

== Transportation ==
The nearby Railway stations to Kakaut village are New Kaithal Halt Railway station (NKLE), Kaithal Railway station (KLE) and Geong Railway station (GXG).

From Kaithal bus stand, bus services are also available to Delhi, Hisar, Chandigarh, Jammu and many other places.
