= Rajound =

Rajound City Rajound
- City
- Location in Haryana, India Rajound City (India)
- Coordinates: 29°34′35″N 76°28′56″E
- Country: India
- State: Haryana
- District: Kaithal
- Time zone: UTC+5:30 (IST)
- PIN: 136044
- Telephone code: 01746
- Lok Sabha constituency: Kurukshetra

Rajound is a city in Kaithal District of Haryana State in India.

This is an administrative block and sub-tehsil. Its population according to 2001 census is 15,335. Its male population is 8,147, and its female population is 7,188. Rajound is located on State Highway no. 11 at Kaithal-Assandh section. Frequent bus service at every 10 minutes from Kaithal to Rajound is available. The land around Rajound is fertile and well irrigated by canal water and tubewells, it is a major producer of wheat and rice.

Historical places in Rajound includes:

- Makhdum Peer and Raju Peer, on Rajound to Mandhwal Road
- Sultan Peer on Kotra Road
- Baba Bahadurban Mandir, in the middle of the village
- Shiv Mandir, near Baba Bahadurban Mandir
- Jahar Vir Goga Peer, on Kaithal Road
- Devi Mandir, near the general hospital and main bazaar

Places for education and other facilities:

- Govt. Schools - Govt Boys Sr. Sec. School, Govt Girls Sr. Sec. School, Govt. Pr. School
- Private Schools - Gold Life School, M.D. Sr. Sec. School, Birla open minds international school, Gian Deep Sr. Sec. School, S.P.N. School, S.D.M. School,
- College & Other Institutes - Govt P.G. girls college (Proposed), Govt I.T.I., Savitri Devi Memorial group of colleges for Pharmacy and Education, S.P.N. private I.T.I., M.D. college.
- Shehnai Garden Marriage Palace Jind Road, Sona Palace Kaithal Road, Punjabi Palace Kithana Road
- Libraries-Study Space Library, Pundri road

Government offices and facilities:

- Block Education Office
- Sub Magistrate Office
- Post office
- Police Station
- Municipal Committee office
- ABRC office
- Govt Hospital
- Govt Veterinary Hospital
- Patwarkhana
- 32 KV Substation
- Bus Stand

== Notable people ==
- Manoj Kumar, an Olympian, Arjuna awardee, and the world's 6th ranked boxer from Rajound.
