= Harsola, Kaithal =

Harsola
- village
- Location in Haryana, India Harsola (India)
- Coordinates: 29°44′1.5468″N 76°26′17.7792″E
- Country: India
- State: Haryana
- District: Kaithal district

Government
  - Type: Local government
  - Body: Panchayat

Area
  - Total: 13.90 km^{2} (5.37 sq mi)
- Elevation: 237 m (778 ft)

Population (2011)
  - Total: 4,937
  - Density: 355.2/km^{2} (919.9/sq mi)

Languages
  - Official: Hindi
- Time zone: UTC+5:30 (IST)
- PIN: 136027
- Telephone code: 01746
- Vehicle registration: HR-08
- Literacy: 61.69% (total); 73.70% (male); 47.26% (female)
- Sex ratio: 841 ♂/♀

Harsola village is located in Kaithal Tehsil of Kaithal district in Haryana, India. It is situated 10 kilometres (6.2 mi) away from Kaithal, which is both district & sub-district headquarter of Harsola village. As per 2009 stats, Harsola village is also a gram panchayat.

== Demographics ==
Most of the population of the village is Hindu and widely spoken language is Haryanvi.

== Schools ==
- Govt. Sr. Secondary School.
- MTM(master tek chand memorial) Public School
- Saraswati Public School

== Transportation ==
The nearby Railway stations to Harsola village are New Kaithal Halt Railway station (NKLE) and Kaithal Railway station (KLE).

From Kaithal bus stand, bus services are also available to Delhi, Hisar, Chandigarh, Jammu and many other places.
