= Boxing at the 2010 Commonwealth Games – Light welterweight =

Boxing competitions

The Light Welterweight class in the boxing at the 2010 Commonwealth Games competition is the fifth lightest class. Light welterweights were limited to those boxers weighing less than 63.5 kilograms (140 lbs).

27 boxers competed in the event.

Like all Olympic boxing events, the competition was a straight single-elimination tournament. Both semifinal losers were awarded bronze medals, so no boxers competed again after their first loss. Bouts consisted of three rounds of three minutes each, with one-minute breaks between rounds. Punches scored only if the front of the glove made full contact with the front of the head or torso of the opponent. Five judges scored each bout; three of the judges had to signal a scoring punch within one second for the punch to score. The winner of the bout was the boxer who scored the most valid punches by the end of the bout.

== Medalists ==
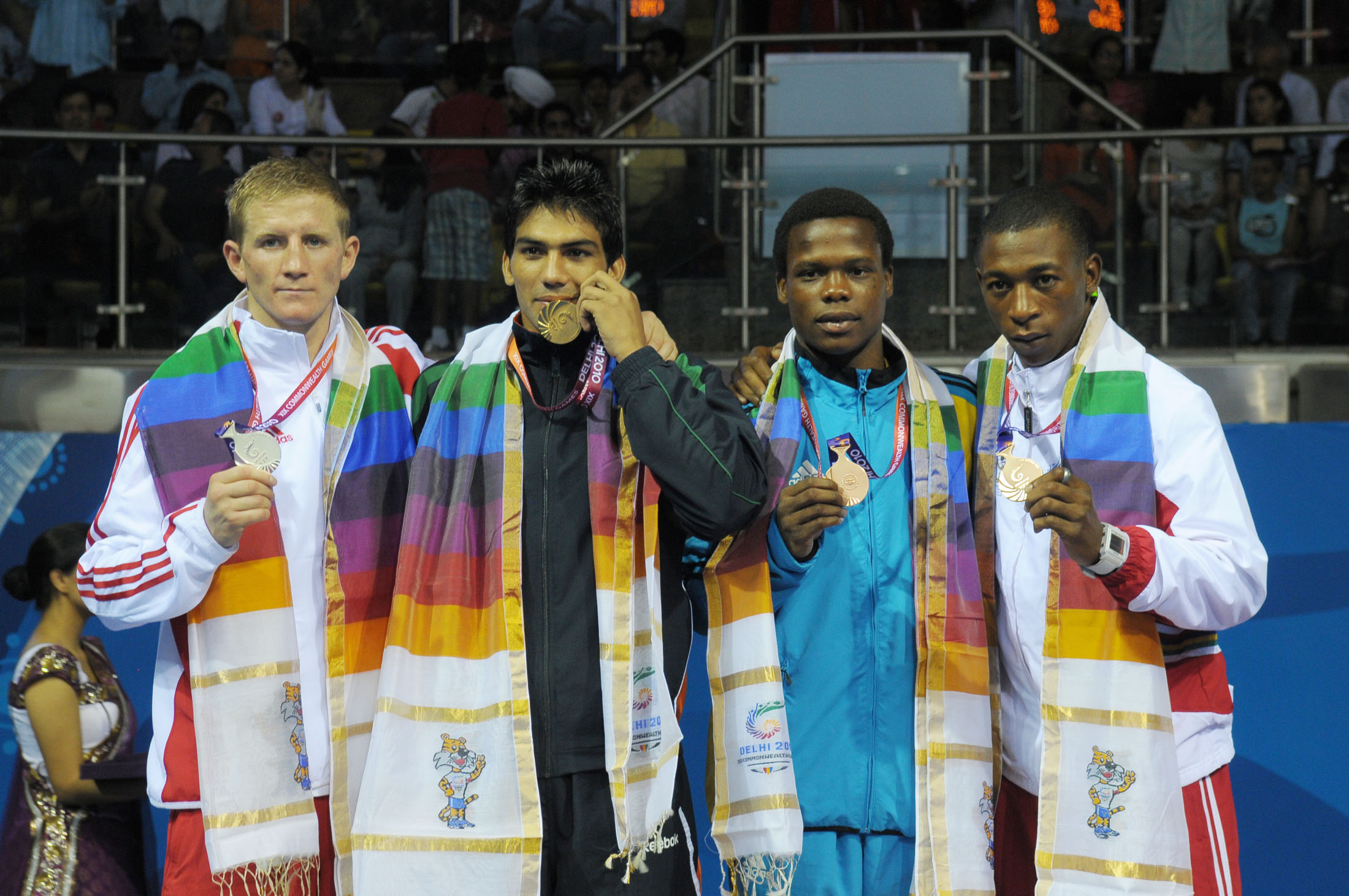
XIX Commonwealth Games-2010 Delhi Winners of Light Welter Weight (64 kg) Boxing Event Manoj Kumar of India (Gold), Bradley Saunders of England (Silver)

Gold	Manoj Kumar; India
Silver	Bradley Saunders; England
Bronze	Valentino Knowles; Bahamas
Bronze	Louis Colin; Mauritius

== Tournament ==
=== Light Welterweight Bracket ===
Round of 32
Blackmoses Mathenge (KEN)	5
Hashim Petro (TAN)	1
Daniel Lassayo (SLE)
Manoj Kumar (IND)	RSC
Thomas Melville (LCA)	RSC
Gomotsang Gaasite (BOT)
Yves Ulysse Jr. (CAN)	6
Abdur Rahim (BAN)	1
Fredrick Lawson (GHA)	8
Muideen Ganiyu (NGR)	5
Mokhachane Moshoeshoe (LES)	2
Anthony Taylor (NZL)	5
Bradley Saunders (ENG)	RSCH
Dominic Boatswain (GRN)
Kir Akyazcan (MAS)	4
Henry Lawrence (DMA)	2
Philip Bowes (JAM)	5
Indrajith Rajapakasha (SRI)	1
Chris Jenkins (WAL)	0
Louis Colin (MRI)	7
Luke Woods (AUS)	10
Steven Donnelly (NIR)	0

Round of 16
Jahziel Lewis (SVG)	1
Ikani Falekaono (TON)	4
Emil Kaoka (PNG)	1
Valentino Knowles (BAH)	12
Chimwemwe Chiotcha (MAW)	0
Blackmoses Mathenge (KEN)	7
Manoj Kumar (IND)	5
Thomas Melville (LCA)	2
Yves Ulysse Jr. (CAN)	5
Fredrick Lawson (GHA)	4
Anthony Taylor (NZL)	0
Bradley Saunders (ENG)	10
Kir Akyazcan (MAS)	2
Philip Bowes (JAM)	+2
Louis Colin (MRI)	8
Luke Woods (AUS)	3

Quarterfinals
Ikani Falekaono (TON)	2
Valentino Knowles (BAH)	28
Blackmoses Mathenge (KEN)	2
Manoj Kumar (IND)	6
Yves Ulysse Jr. (CAN)	4
Bradley Saunders (ENG)	11
Philip Bowes (JAM)	0
Louis Colin (MRI)	6

Semifinals
Valentino Knowles (BAH)	1
Manoj Kumar (IND)	3
Bradley Saunders (ENG)	10
Louis Colin (MRI)	7

Finals
Manoj Kumar (IND)	11
Bradley Saunders (ENG)	2
