= Kalayat =

- Town
- Location in Haryana, India Kalayat (India)
- Coordinates: 29°40′24.5172″N 76°15′30.0528″E
- Country: India
- State: Haryana
- District: Kaithal

Population (2001)
  - Total: 16,747

Languages
  - Official: Hindi, Regional Haryanvi
- Time zone: UTC+5:30 (IST)
- PIN: 136117
- Telephone code: 01746
- ISO 3166 code: IN-HR
- Vehicle registration: HR 83
- Sex ratio: 878 ♂/♀

Kalayat is a town in Kaithal district in the Indian state of Haryana. It is historical town known as Kapilayat and Kapilayatana in past, named after the Vedic sage Kapila, is home of the 8th century Kalayat Ancient Bricks Temple Complex. The legend is that after Dwaraka was submerged, Arjuna along with women and children went towards Hastinapura via Kaithal.

== Demographics ==
As of 2001 India census, Kalayat had a population of 16,747. Males constitute 53% of the population and females 47%. Kalayat has an average literacy rate of 70%, lower than the national average of 74.04%: male literacy is 70%, and female literacy is 65%. In Kalayat, 17% of the population is under 0–6 years of age.

== See also ==
- Kalayat Ancient Bricks Temple Complex
- Shri Kapil Muni Mandir
- Khajuraho temples
- List of Monuments of National Importance in Haryana
- List of State Protected Monuments in Haryana
- List of Indus Valley Civilization sites in Haryana
- List of National Parks & Wildlife Sanctuaries of Haryana, India
- Haryana Tourism
