= Bradley Saunders =

British boxer

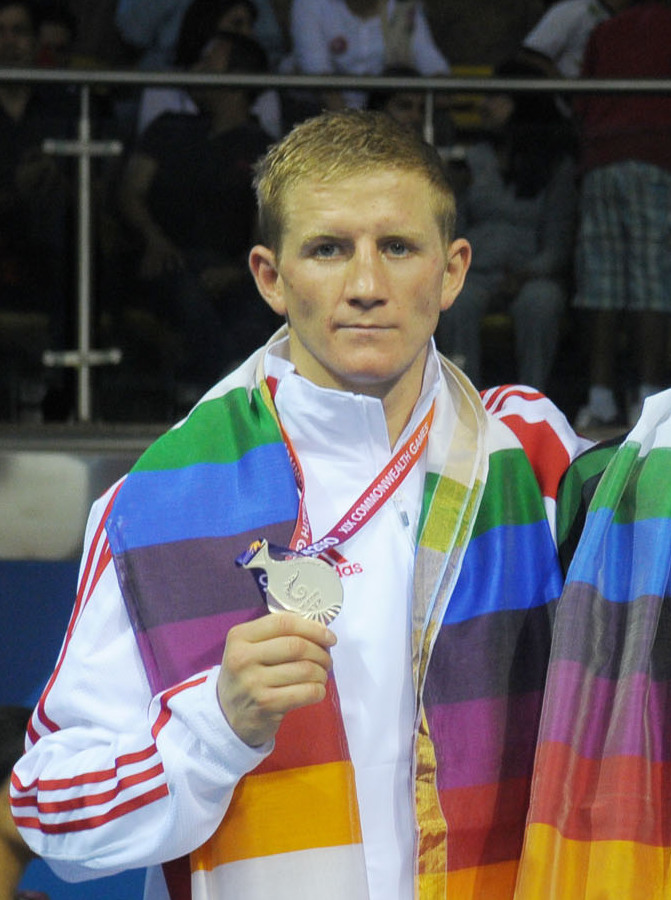
- XIX Commonwealth Games-2010 Delhi Winners of Light Welter Weight (64 kg) Boxing Event where Bradley Saunders won Silver

Personal information
- Nationality: British
- Born: 4 February 1986 (age 40) Stockton-on-Tees, England
- Height: 178 cm (5 ft 10 in)
- Weight: Light welterweight Welterweight

Boxing career
- Stance: Orthodox

Boxing record
- Total fights: 14
- Wins: 13
- Win by KO: 10
- Losses: 1
Medal record
Men's boxing
Representing England
World Amateur Championships
Bronze medal – third place	2007 Chicago	Light welterweight
EU Amateur Championships
Gold medal – first place	2009 Odense	Light welterweight
Bronze medal – third place	2007 Dublin	Light welterweight
Commonwealth Games
Silver medal – second place	2010	Light welterweight

Bradley Saunders (born 4 February 1986) is a British professional boxer. As an amateur, he won a silver medal in the light welterweight division at the 2010 Commonwealth Games, gold at the 2009 EU Championships and bronze at the 2007 World Championships.

== Amateur career ==
Saunders won the British championships in 2006 whilst representing South Durham ABC.. He qualified for the 2007 World championships held in Chicago and won a bronze medal defeating the likes of local favourite Javier Molina(24:12) and Frenchman Alexis Vastine in order to join compatriots Frankie Gavin and bantam Joe Murray on the medal podiums and, in doing so, qualifying for the Beijing Olympics in 2008.

In the Olympic tournament Saunders' first round victory was followed with defeat in the second round to former victim Alexis Vastine. Following the tournament Saunders made the decision to stay amateur whilst a number of his Team GB colleagues made the move to the professional boxing ranks.

In June 2009 Saunders returned to the ring to compete in the European Union championships held in Odense, winning gold and beating a fellow former World Championship bronze medallist Gyula Kate of Hungary along the way.

Just prior to the 2009 World Championships due to be held in Milan, Saunders broke his left thumb in a training bout. A potential winner of gold at the event Saunders reflected on the injury by saying "I am a firm believer that everything happens for a reason...I'm going to focus totally on 2012. Maybe then I'll look back and be glad this all happened".

=== World Amateur Championships ===
- Defeated Boris Katalinic (Croatia) 23-12
- Defeated Gumersindo Carrasco (Argentina) RSCO
- Defeated Javier Molina (United States) 24-12
- Defeated Alexis Vastine (France) 30-13
- Lost to Gennady Kovalev (Russia) 8-16

=== Commonwealth Games 2010 ===
- Defeated Anthony Taylor (New Zealand)
- Defeated Yves Ulysse (Canada) in the quarters
- Defeated Louis Colin of (Mauritius) in a close scoring semifinal 10-7
- Lost to Manoj Kumar of (India) in the final 2-11

=== Olympic Games ===
- Defeated Samuel Kotey Neequaye (Ghana) KO 1 (2:24)
- Lost to Alexis Vastine (France) 11-7

== Professional career ==
Saunders signed his first professional contract with Frank Warren and made his professional boxing debut on 10 February 2012 against Jason Nesbitt scoring a TKO victory in the 3rd round.

== Professional boxing record ==
14 fights, 13 wins (10 knockouts), 1 loss (1 disqualification)
Res.	Record	Opponent	Type	Rd., Time	Date	Location	Notes
Win	13–1	(United Kingdom) Casey Blair	TKO	1 (6), 2:43	2017-06-23	(United Kingdom) Walker Activity Dome, Newcastle, Tyne and Wear	
Loss	12–1	(France) Renald Garrido	DQ	6 (8), 2:53	2015-09-19	(United Kingdom) Liverpool Olympia, Liverpool, Merseyside	
Win	12–0	(France) Stephane Benito	TKO	5 (6), 2:50	2015-03-07	(United Kingdom) Hull Arena, Hull, Yorkshire	
Win	11–0	(Latvia) Ivans Levickis	PTS	6	2014-11-22	(United Kingdom) Echo Arena, Liverpool, Merseyside	
Win	10–0	(Finland) Ville Piispanen	KO	1 (10), 1:21	2014-06-07	Metro Radio Arena, Newcastle upon Tyne, United Kingdom	Won vacant WBO Inter-Continental Light Welterweight title.
Win	9–0	(United Kingdom) Mitch Prince	TKO	4 (10), 1:10	2014-03-29	Metro Radio Arena, Newcastle upon Tyne, United Kingdom	
Win	8–0	(Hungary) Gyorgy Mizsei Jr	TKO	4 (8), 1:00	2013-11-22	Leisure Centre, Gateshead, United Kingdom	
Win	7–0	(United Kingdom) Gareth Heard	TKO	4 (8), 2:54	2013-10-07	Royal Lancaster Hotel, London, United Kingdom	
Win	6–0	(Republic of Ireland) Michael Kelly	TKO	5 (6), 0:41	2013-07-20	Wembley Arena, London, United Kingdom	
Win	5–0	(United Kingdom) Peter McDonagh	PTS	8	2012-11-30	Manchester Arena, Manchester, United Kingdom	
Win	4–0	(Slovakia) Ivan Godor	TKO	3 (6), 1:25	2012-09-22	Scottish Exhibition Centre, Glasgow, United Kingdom	
Win	3–0	(United Kingdom) Kevin McCauley	UD	6	2012-07-14	Upton Park, London, United Kingdom	
Win	2–0	(Bulgaria) Danny Dontchev	RTD	1 (6), 3:00	2012-04-28	Royal Albert Hall, London, United Kingdom	
Win	1–0	(United Kingdom) Jason Nesbitt	TKO	3 (6), 2:57	2012-02-10	York Hall, London, United Kingdom	Professional debut.

== Personal life ==
On 25 November 2008 Saunders was questioned by police on suspicion of dealing cocaine after a police sniffer dog found what was alleged to be £12,000 worth of the drug in his back garden. The charges were dropped against the boxer in April 2009 when the police decided not to proceed with the case.
