= Narar =

- village
- Location in Haryana, India Narar (India)
- Coordinates: 29°46′47.8884″N 76°27′29.3472″E
- Country: India
- State: Haryana
- District: Kaithal district

Government
  - Type: Local government
  - Body: Panchayat

Area
  - Total: 11.53 km^{2} (4.45 sq mi)
- Elevation: 237 m (778 ft)

Population (2011)
  - Total: 4,440
  - Density: 385/km^{2} (997/sq mi)

Languages
  - Official: Hindi
- Time zone: UTC+5:30 (IST)
- PIN: 136027
- Telephone code: 01746
- Vehicle registration: HR-08
- Literacy: 64.06% (total); 74.65% (male); 51.98% (female)
- Sex ratio: 873 ♂/♀
- Post Office: Narar

Narar village is located in Kaithal Tehsil of Kaithal district in Haryana, India. It is situated 5 kilometres (3.1 mi) away from Kaithal, which is both district & sub-district headquarter of Narar village. As per constitution of India and Panchyati Raaj Act, Narar village is administrated by Sarpanch (Head of Village) who is elected representative of village.

Most of the people are Jats .

== Demographics ==
Most of the population of the village is Jat and widely spoken language is Haryanvi.

== Schools ==
- Govt. Sr. Secondary Sechool, Narar
- N.A. Sr. Sec. School, Narar

== Transportation ==
The nearby Railway stations to Narar village are New Kaithal Halt Railway station (NKLE), Kaithal Railway station (KLE) and Geong Railway station (GXG).

From Kaithal bus stand, bus services are also available to Delhi, Hisar, Chandigarh, Jammu and many other places.
