= Tomb of Sheikh Tayyab =

Coordinates: 29°47′28″N 76°23′24″E

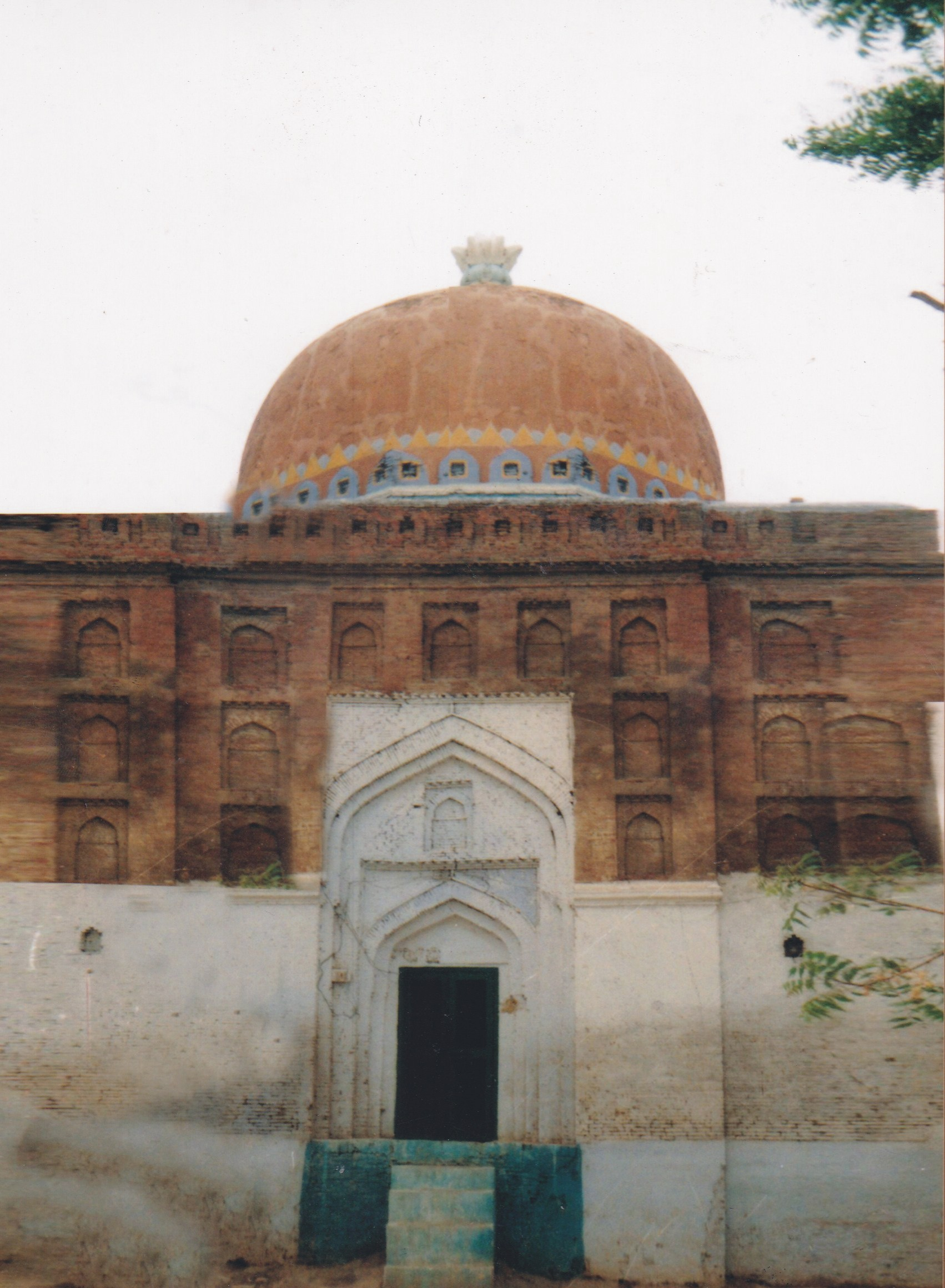
- Tomb of Sheikh Tayyab, c. 2015
- Type: tomb
- Location: Haryana, India
- Built: 17th century CE
- Architectural style(s): Mughal architecture

The Tomb of Sheikh Tayyab in Kaithal, Haryana, India, holds the remains of Sheikh Tayyab. It was constructed by Shah Sikander.

Sheikh Tayyab was a disciple and Khalifa of Baba Shah Jamal. His tomb is in Kaithal city near the railway station. Sheikh Tayyab was known as Lala Maidni Mal and was one of the advisors in the Mughal court.

== Architecture ==
The tomb employs Pashtun architecture with a bulbous roof and a lotus flower that rests on the octagonal drum base. The monument plan is square.

== Tradition ==
Qanugos who lived in Qanugoyan in Kaithal are descendants of Sheikh Tayyab's Hindu wife. Qanugos sent a pitcher of sweet drink to Baba Shah in the Jamal shrine and Tayyab masjid when they married.
