= Takiya Banwa Fakir =

Indian heritage site

Takiya Banwa Fakir is one of the state protected monument at Panchkula district in Haryana.
