= Kaithal =

City in Haryana, India

Kaithal Kapisthal
- City
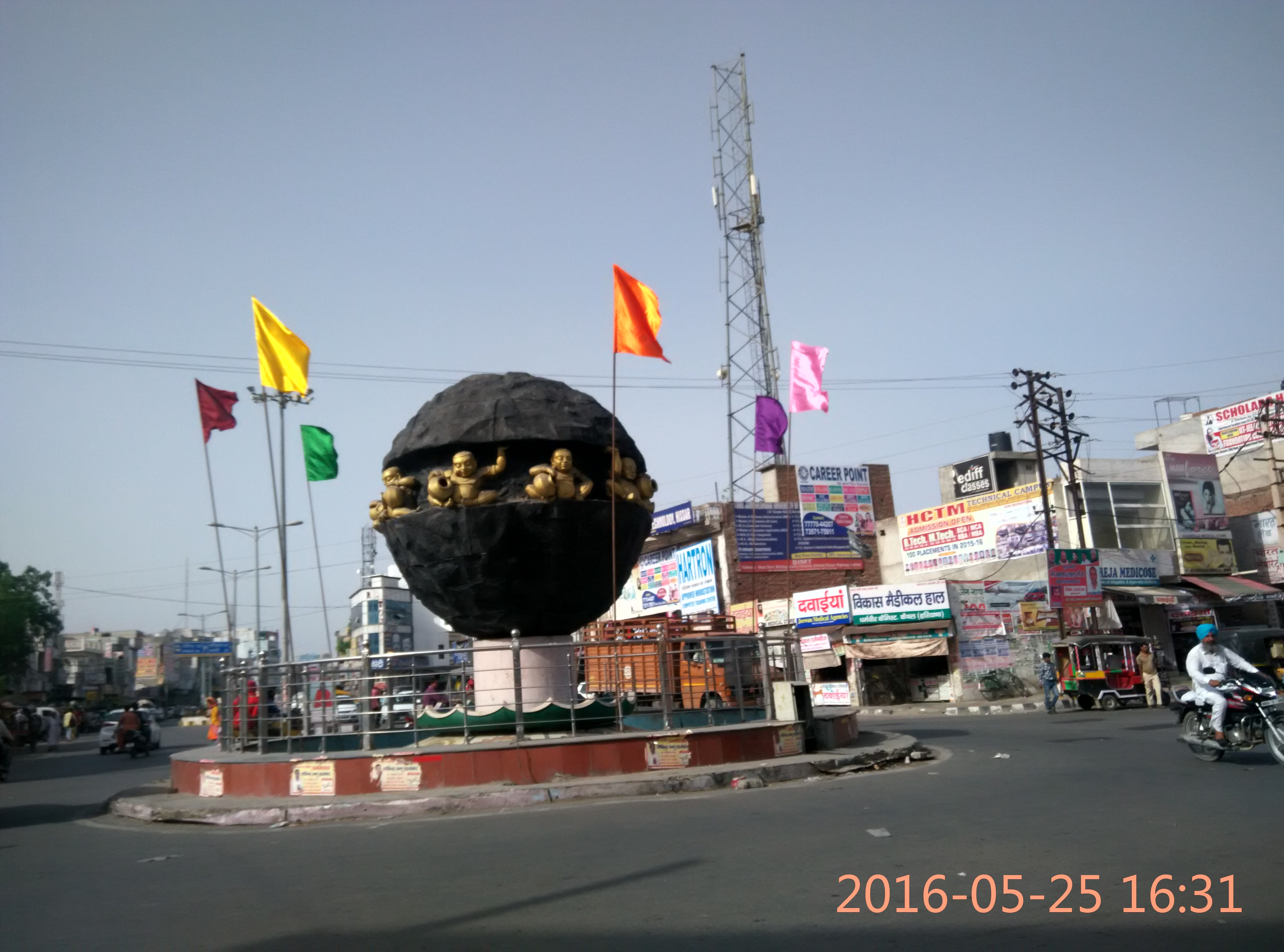
- Pehowa Chowk, Kaithal

- Location in Haryana, India Kaithal (India)
- Coordinates: 29.8015°N 76.3998°E
- Country: India
- State: Haryana
- District: Kaithal
- Named for: Hanuman

Government
  - Type: Municipal Council
  - Body: Municipal Council Kaithal
- Elevation: 250 m (820 ft)

Population (2011)
  - Total: 144,915

Languages
  - Official: Hindi
  - Native: Haryanvi
- Time zone: UTC+5:30 (IST)
- PIN: 136027
- Telephone code: 01746
- ISO 3166 code: IN-HR
- Vehicle registration: HR-08, HR-64 (for commercial vehicles)
- Sex ratio: 887 ♂/♀
- Lok Sabha constituency: Kurukshetra
- Website: kaithal.gov.in

Kaithal (Hindi: [kɛːt̪ʰl]) is a city and municipal council in the Kaithal district of the Indian state of Haryana. Kaithal was previously a part of Karnal district and later, Kurukshetra district until 1 November 1989, when it became the headquarters of Kaithal. It shares a border with the Patiala district of state Punjab and the Kurukshetra, Jind and Karnal districts of Haryana. Kaithal district is situated in the North-West of the Haryana state. Its North-West boundaries, which include Guhla-Cheeka are attached to Punjab.

== History ==
=== Mythology ===
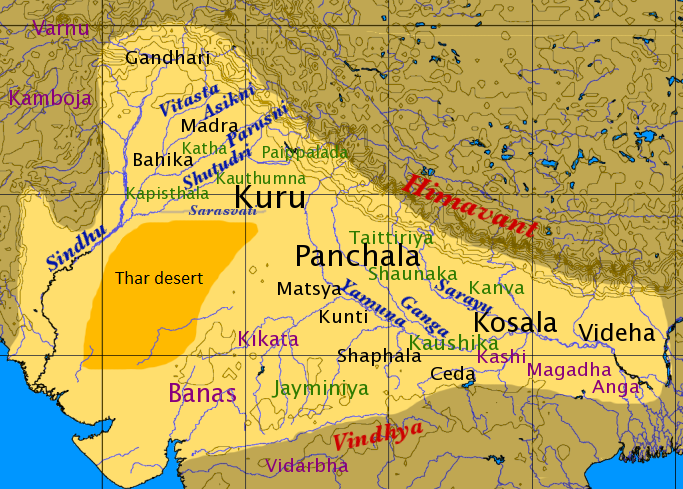
Kaithal was known as Kapisthala during the Vedic period as seen in the map of the Indian subcontinent.

Historically the city was known as Kapisthal, meaning "Abode of Kapi", another name of Lord Hanuman, and it is said to have been founded by the Pandava Emperor, Yudhishthira of Mahabharata. The later word Kaithal is said to be derived from Kapisthala. It is traditionally connected with Hanuman and has a temple dedicated to Anjani, the mother of Hanuman. It is also said that it is the birthplace of Lord Hanuman and there is a temple constructed at that place known as "Anjani Tila" among the residents of Kaithal.

The Vridhakedara (Vidkyar) sanctum of Kaithal finds a mention in the Vamana Purana. Kaithal, with many of its temples, is also an important milestone in the 48 Kos Parikrama pilgrimage.

=== Early and medieval history ===
Timur stopped here in 1398, before attacking Delhi. Later, the city became a Muslim cultural centre, under the rule of Delhi Sultanate. Tombs of several Sufi saints dating from the 13th century can be found in the city today; most important among them is that of Sheikh Salah-ud-din of Bhalkh (Balkh?) (1246 CE). The town was renovated and a fort was built during the rule of the Mughal Emperor, Akbar, and as per Ain-i-Akbari, it was a pargana, under the sarkar of Sirhind, and had developed into an agricultural centre.

Razia Sultan, the first Muslim woman ruler of Delhi, reigned as the Sultan of Delhi Sultanate from 1236 to 1240. She fled Delhi with Malik Altunia after they were defeated on the 24th of Rabí'u-l awwal A.H. 638 (Oct. 1240), and reached Kaithal the next day, where their remaining forces abandoned them, and were killed on 13 November 1240. The tomb of Rajia Begam is still found here. This aspect is still not well known outside Kaithal, but residents know about the Mazaar of Razia Begum even generations later.

Timur took the town in 1398, with his army massacring or plundering the inhabitants and destroying all villages along the way to Assandh. Many of the residents of Kaithal and the other cities had fled to Delhi in fear.

=== Modern history ===
In 1767, the city fell into the hands of the Singh Krora Misl chieftain, Bhai Desu Singh (d. 1781), who led a large Sikh force from his native village of Bhucho, establishing the Kaithal State. In the Punjab whose descendants, the bhais of Kaithal, ranked among the most powerful Cis-Sutlej states. The Sikh Chieftains of Kaithal, ruled from 1767 until its fall in 1843. By 1808, it came under British influence. The state was ruled by the Scindhia dynasty of the Maratha Empire and paid tributes to the Marathas, until the Second Anglo-Maratha War of 1803–1805, after which the Marathas lost this territory to the British. Bhai Udey Singh ruled over Kaithal and proved to be the last King. Bhai Udey Singh died on 14 March 1843 and State become part of Thanesar District & transfer to Punjab province in 1849 along with Cis-Sutlej states. which later abolished in 1862 and kaithal area become part of karnal district tahsil. Kaithal town became a municipality in 1867. In 1901, the town had a population of 14,408. The fort of the Bhais is still extant, and their title Bhai became common with the primary Jat Sikh rulers. Peoples of Kaithal took active part in the freedom struggle in 1857.

== Geographics ==
=== Topography ===
Kaithal is located at 29.8015°N 76.3996°E. It has an average elevation of 220 metres (721 feet).

== Demographics ==
Religion in Kaithal (2011)
Religion	Percent
Hinduism	96.46%
Sikhism	2.47%
Islam	0.64%
Others	0.43%

As of the 2011 Indian Census, Kaithal had a total population of 144,915, of which 76,794 were males and 68,121 were females. The population within the age group of 0 to 6 years was 17,531. The total number of literates in Kaithal was 100,944, which constituted 69.7% of the population with a male literacy of 75.3% and a female literacy of 63.3%. The effective literacy rate of the 7+ population of Kaithal was 79.2%, of which male literacy rate was 86.1% and the female literacy rate was 71.6%. The Jat population was 24,760. Kaithal had 28547 households in 2011.

Hindi is the official language of Kaithal. Regional Spoken language is Haryanvi. English are additional official languages.

Religion in Kaithal City
Religion	Population (1911)	Percentage (1911)	Population (1941)	Percentage (1941)
Hinduism (Note: 1941 census: Including Ad-Dharmis)	6,546	50.7%	11,593	51.93%
Islam	6,002	46.48%	10,263	45.97%
Sikhism	241	1.87%	261	1.17%
Christianity	23	0.18%	49	0.22%
Others (Note: Including Jainism, Buddhism, Zoroastrianism, Judaism, others, or not stated)	100	0.77%	159	0.71%
Total Population	12,912	100%	22,325	100%

== Tourism ==
=== Kaithal Fort ===
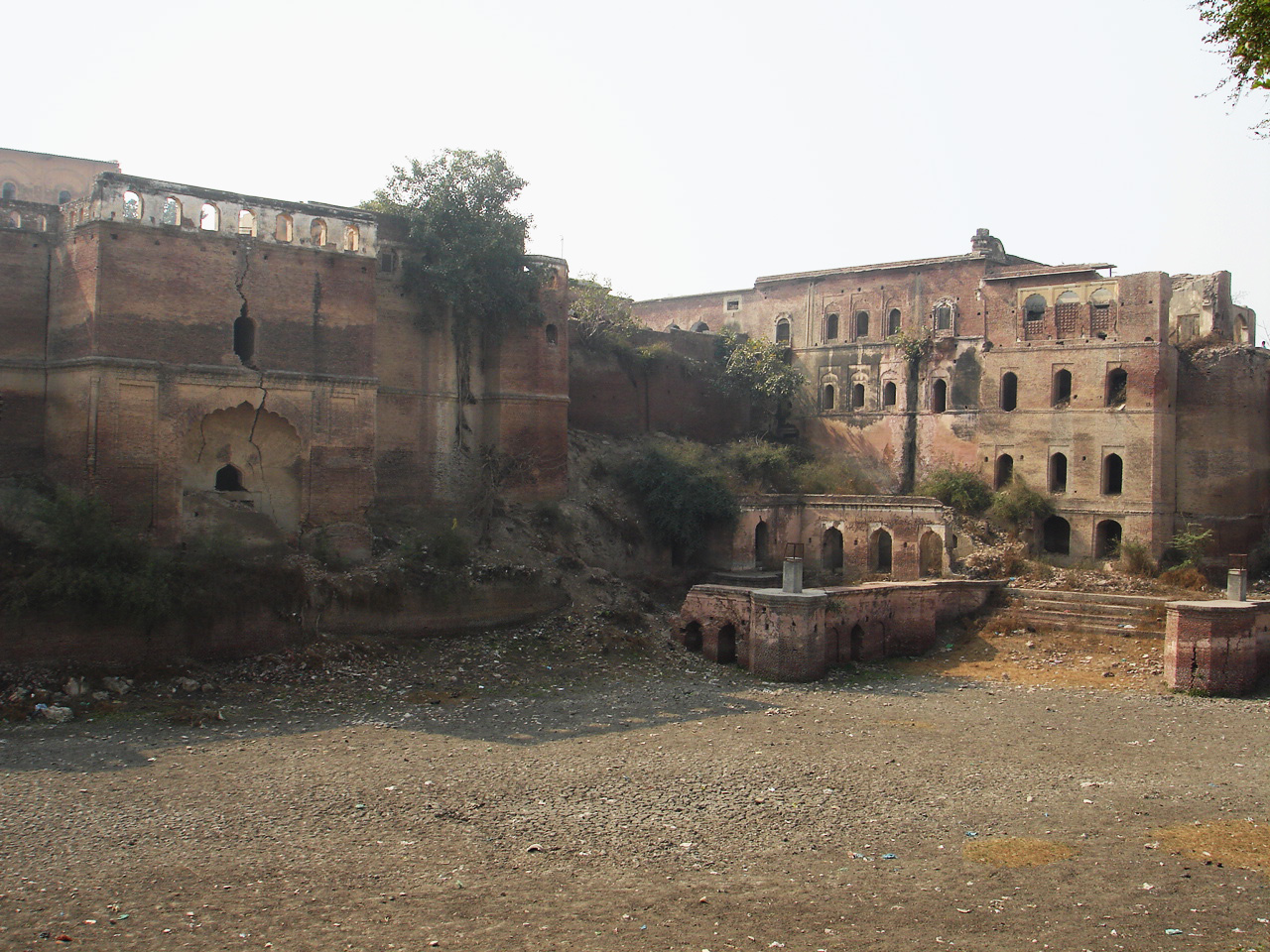
Ruins of Kaithal fortress, 2007. Kaithal Fort, which would have been from 1767 to 1843, the seat and residence of Royal family of Kaithal

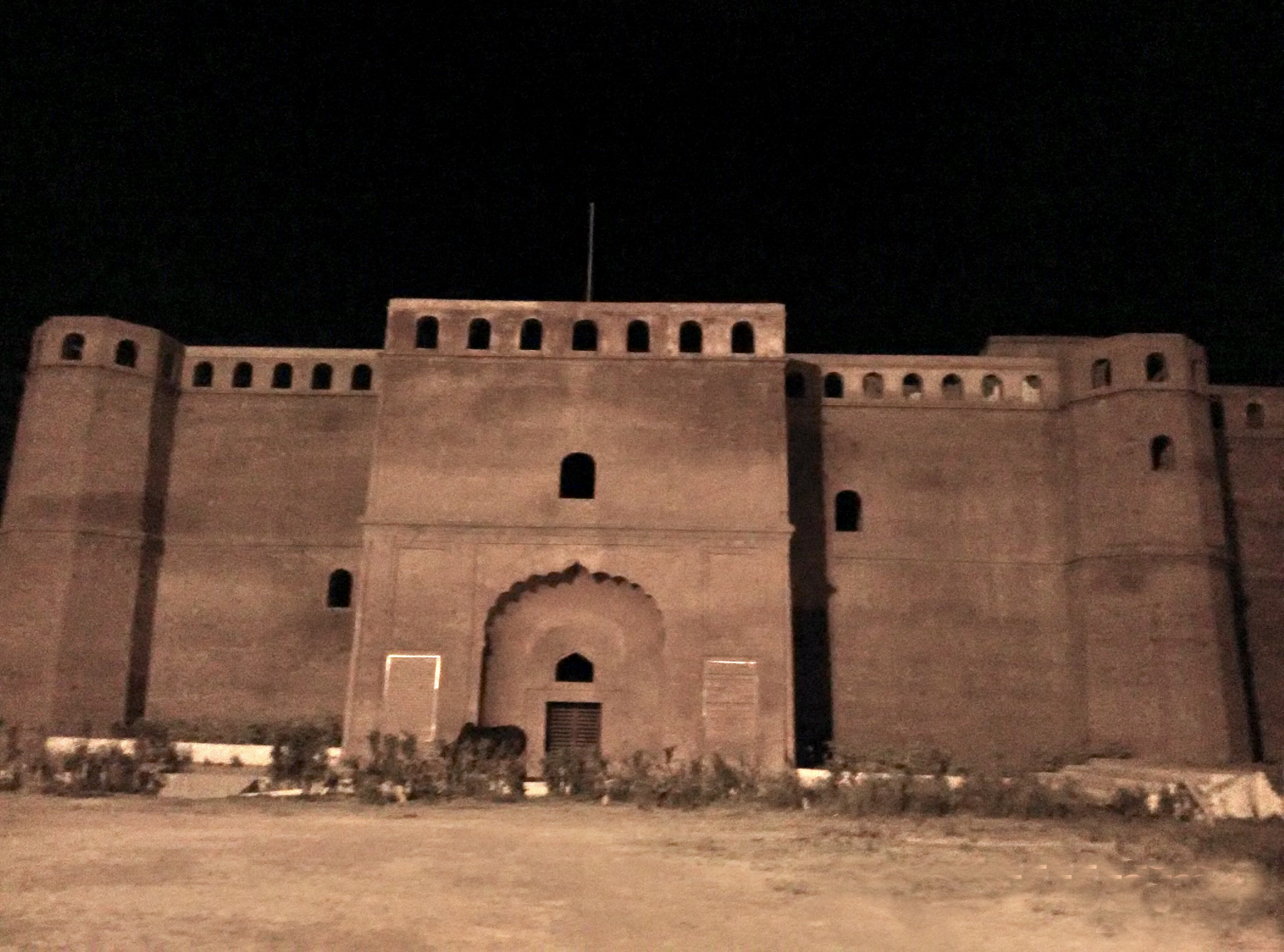
Kaithal Fort after restoration, 2016

There exists the remains of the fort of the Bhais, and several Muslim tombs of the 13th century and later. The Kaithal fort has many gates made by British rulers and used to control the entry of trade goods and other items.

The fort was restored and renovated in 2016 (as seen in pictures). It now forms one of the most visible and important landmarks of Kaithal.

=== Bhai ki Haveli ===
Bhai ki Haveli, is a haveli (mansion) was built by last ruler of Kaithal State, Udya Singh.

=== Stepwell ===
Bhai ki Baoli, a 3 story stepwell covered with dome and accessible by stairs from north and south, was constructed in lakhori bricks by the bhai rulers of Kaithal State. It lies 400 meters north of Bhai ki Haveli.

=== Tomb of Razia Sultan ===
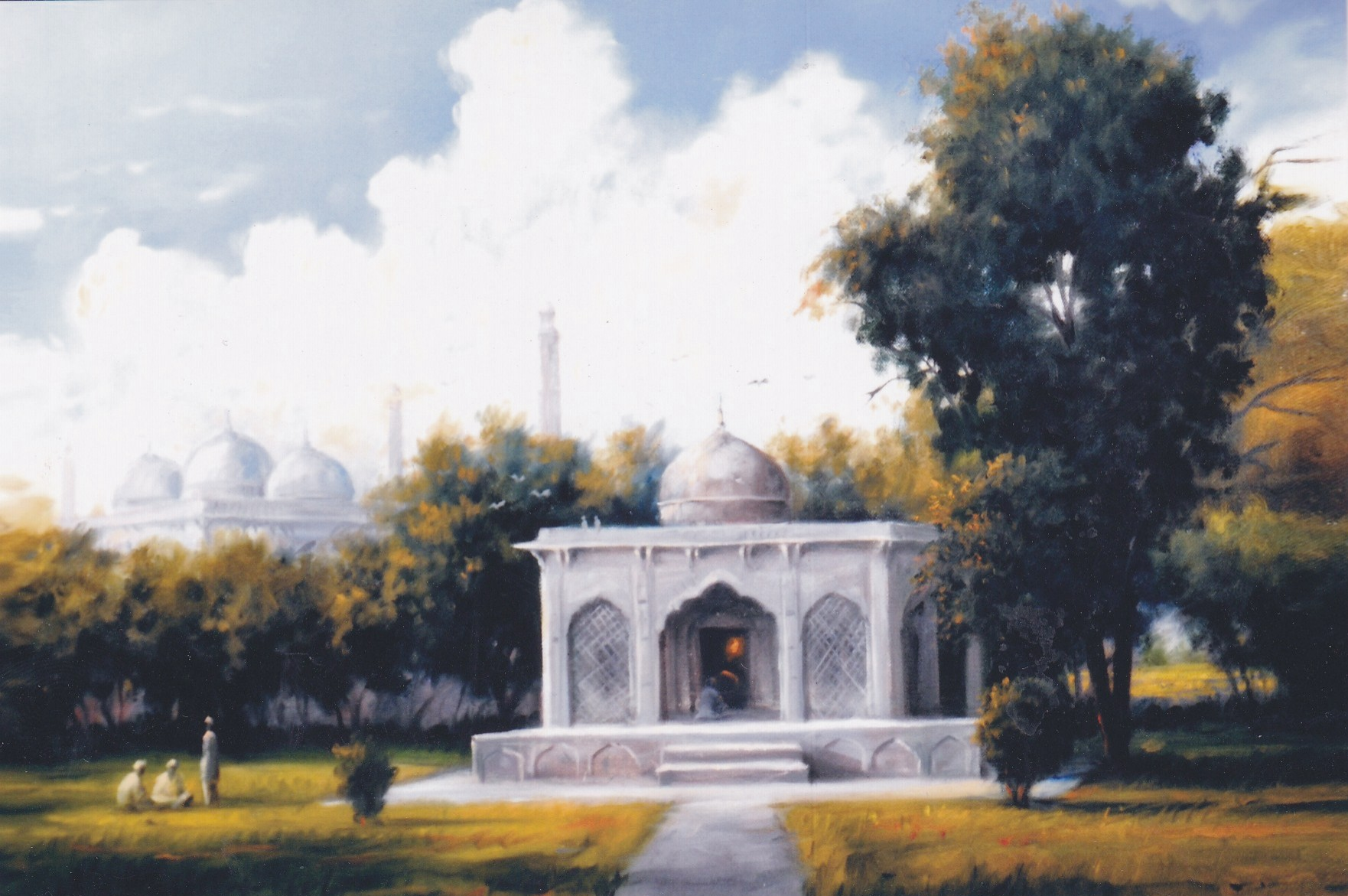
Razia sultana tomb painting

The tomb of Razia Sultan, who gained the throne of Delhi Sultanate under the Mamluk Sultanate, is situated 10 km north-west of the Kaithal city in Siwan on the Kaithal-Cheeka-Patiala road. It is near the jail constructed nearby by the present administration. She and her husband Malik Altunia, who was the governor of Bhatinda (Punjab), were decapitated by the local Jat people of the area. It is speculated that she might have been disinterred from Kaithal and then reburied at her tomb in Delhi.

Raziya al-Din (1205 in Budaun – 13 October 1240), throne name Jalâlat ud-Dîn Raziyâ, usually referred to in history as Razia Sultan, was the Sultan of Delhi in India from 1236 to May 1240. Like some other Muslim princesses of the time, she was trained to lead armies and administer kingdoms if necessary. Razia Sultan was the only woman ruler of both the Sultanate and the Mughal period, although other women ruled from behind the scenes. Razia refused to be addressed as Sultana because it meant "wife or consort of a Sultan". She would answer only to the title "Sultan."

=== One of the highest flags of India ===
In Kaithal a 22-by-14.6-metre (72 by 48 ft) national flag is hoisted 63 metres (207 ft) above the ground in Hanuman Vatika.

=== 48 Kos Temples ===
Following two pilgrimage points of Kaithal town form part of Kurukshetra's 48 kos pariktrama.

=== Vidkyar Teerth (Vriddh Kedaar) ===
Vriddh Kedaar, or Vidkyaar as it is popularly known, is an important religious place for Hindus. This is one of the several pilgrimages in 48 kos parikrama of Kurukshetra. This pilgrimage has been mentioned in the ancient text of Vamana Purana also. Vaman Purana said: "Kapisthaleti vikhyatam sarvapatakanashanam yasmina sthitaha swayam devovridha kedara samgjijitaha" (2) (Translation: The destroyer of all devilish deeds, the famous Kapisthala sanctum is here because Lord Vridhakedara himself resides in it.) The Vridhakedara sanctum changed to "Vidkyara" as a result of the philological principle of "mukhasukha", or ease of speaking. It is located near pehowa chowk, the central point of Kaithal.

=== Shree Gyarah Rudri Mandir ===
It is one of the famous temples of city, where divine eleven Rudra were placed long ago. The temple is known for its art, architecture, beautiful scriptures and large area. A large statue of Hanuman complements the beauty of this temple.

=== Religious tourism ===
==== Anjani Teela ====
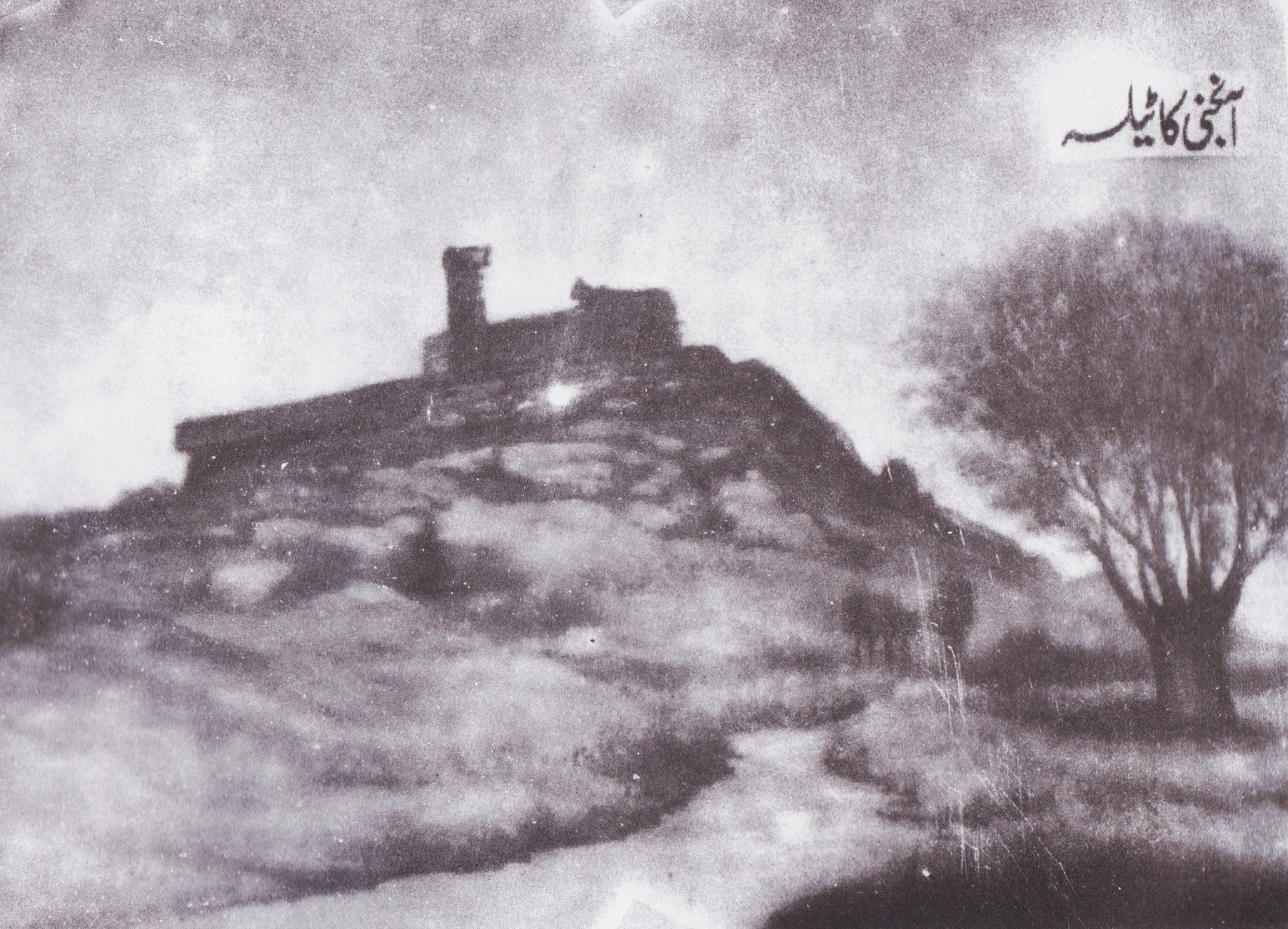
Anjani Ka Tilla

Anjani was the name of the mother of Lord Hanuman. Kaithal was earlier known as Kapisthal, the abode of monkeys (or monkey God, Hanuman).

==== Ancient Khandeshwar Temple ====
This is an ancient temple dedicated to Lord Shiva.

==== Gyrah Rudri Shiva Temple ====
Out of 108 Shiva Temples situated in the city, Gyrah-Rudri Temple is the most famous one of its own kind. Legend has it that it is at this place during Mahabharata era, Arjun had been conferred Pashupat Astra by praying to Lord Shiva.

==== Sikh gurudwaras ====
- Gurudwara Neem Sahib - This Gurudwara is located at the Dogra gate, near Sivan Gate on the Cheeka Pehowa Road, Kaithal.

This Gurudwara is dedicated to the Ninth Guru, Guru Tegh Bahadur Ji. He stopped here on his way from Anandpur Sahib to Delhi. Guruji stayed at the site of Gurudwara Manji Sahib. Early in the morning, Guruji came to this place. After taking a bath at the Thandar Tirth (also referred to as the Dandhar Tirth), Guru sat in meditation under a neem tree at this place. A large congregation of people who had heard of the Guru's arrival gathered there. One amongst them suffered from high fever. Guruji gave him the leaves of the neem tree and he was cured. This place then came to be known as Neem Sahib. All gurpurabs are celebrated here. Langar is organised every month on Sangrand (the first day of the month in the lunar calendar). A local committee appointed by the Shiromani Gurdwara Prabhandhak Committee looks after the management of the Gurudwara.

- Gurudwara Topiyon Wala - Situated in the middle of the city, this is the only Gurudwara/Temple where Guru Granth Sahib and Ramayan are recited together—a unique combination of Sikhism & Hinduism.
- Gurudwara Manji Sahib - Gurdwara Manji Sahib is situated in Sethan Mohalla, near Hind Cinema. It is near the Gita Bhavan.

This Gurudwara is dedicated to the Ninth Guru, Guru Tegh Bahadur. Guru Tegh Bahadur, after emancipating the sangat of the Malwa region, arrived here from Baher. The Guru told a carpenter from Bahir, named Malla, that he wanted to go to Kaithal and asked if there was any Sikh devotee there. Malla replied that there were two houses belonging to Banias and one to a Sikh there. On reaching Kaithal, Malla asked Guru whose house he would like to go to first. Guru replied the one that is nearest. Malla took Guru to the house of a fellow carpenter, also named Malla, who served the Guru with great devotion. Pleased with his devotion, the Guru told him to light a lamp for 40 days in honour of the Guru's darbar and he would be blessed with a son. The carpenter had a son in due course and he donated this place to the Gurudwara. At the request of the banias, Guru visited their house for lunch. He blessed the spot by saying that kirtan (singing of devotional songs) would be the norm here. This is the site of the Gurudwaras Manji Sahib. Guru spent three days preaching the tenets of Sikhism here and then left for village Barne. The birth anniversaries of Guru Nanak Dev and Guru Gobind Singh are celebrated with great fervour here.

- Gurudwara Shri Patshahi Chevin Ate Nauvin Sahib - This Gurudwara is situated in the Village Cheeka, Kaithal. Cheeka is situated on the Patiala Kaithal Road. Guru Har Gobind and Guru Tegh Bahadur came here.

Guru Tegh Bahadur ji came here while he was going to Delhi. When Kashmiri Pandits came to Guru in Anandpur Sahib and requested to save them from Aurangzeb. Accepting there request Guru to sacrifice his life to save them Guru while going to Delhi Via Patiala, GURU came here to Bhai Galora Masand. He was Jathedar of Hansi to Hisar. There were followers along with Guru who wanted to accompany Guru to Delhi but Guru stopped them and asked them to return. Followers requested that they will not be able to live without them. Then Guru Tegh Bahadur told them visiting this place will give them the result of having darshan of Guru Tegh Bahadur. It is believed that who so ever will visit this place with devotions his/her wishes will be fulfilled.

- Gurudwara Sahib - This Gurudwara is situated in Nand Singh Wala village, Kaithal. This village is located at Punjab border.

==== Islamic ====
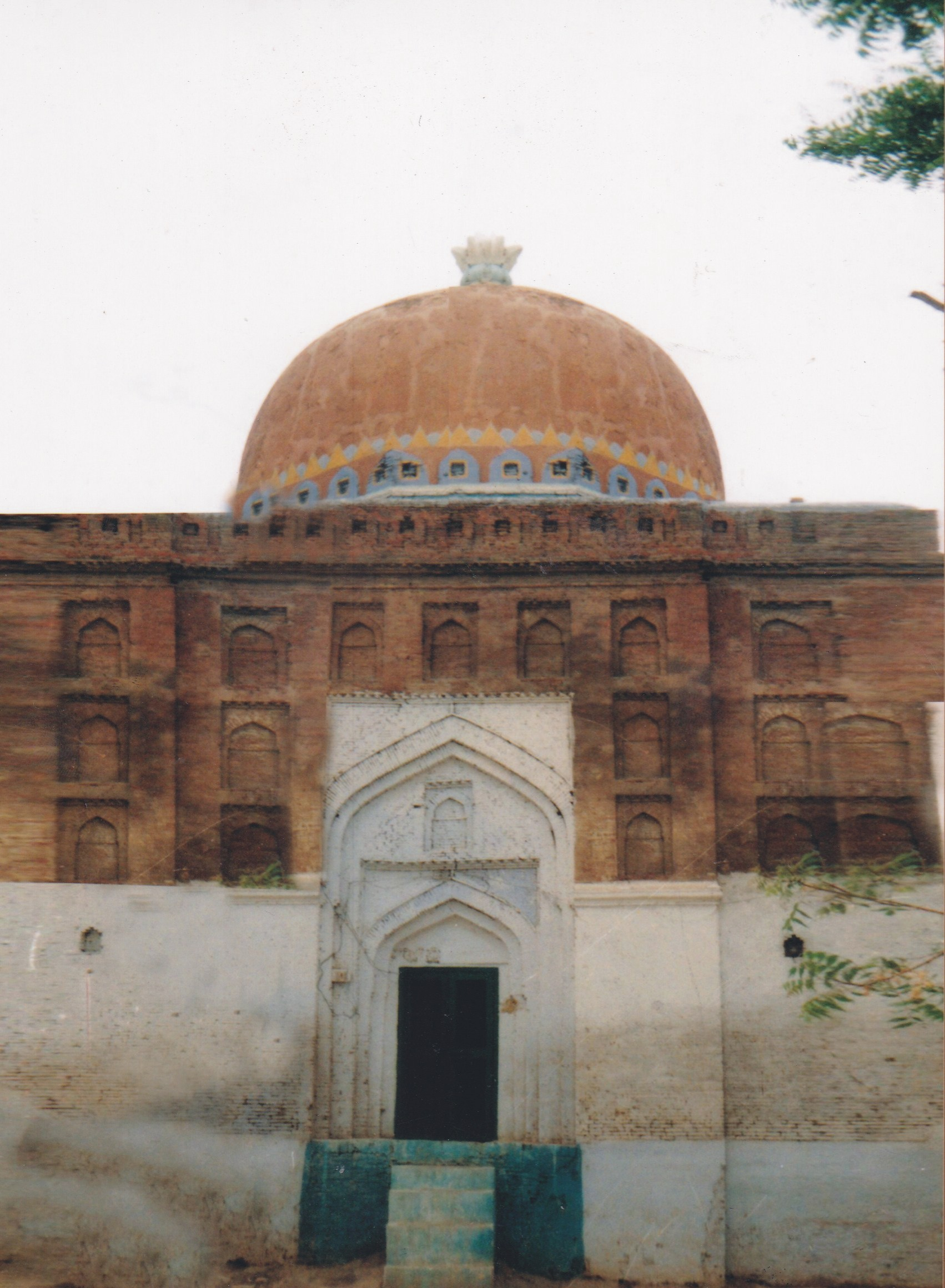
Tomb of Sheikh Tayyab

- Tomb of Sheikh Tayyab: The 16th-century tomb is situated in Kaithal city near Railway line. The words 'Sheikh' and Tayyab' stand for terms 'Fakir' (saint) and 'pure' Sufi saint Shah Kamal came to Kaithal from Bagdad. Sheikh Tayyab was a disciple and khalifa of Baba Shah Kamal. Sheikh Tayyab died sometime in the late 16th century AD. It is said that this tomb was constructed by Shah Sikandar,
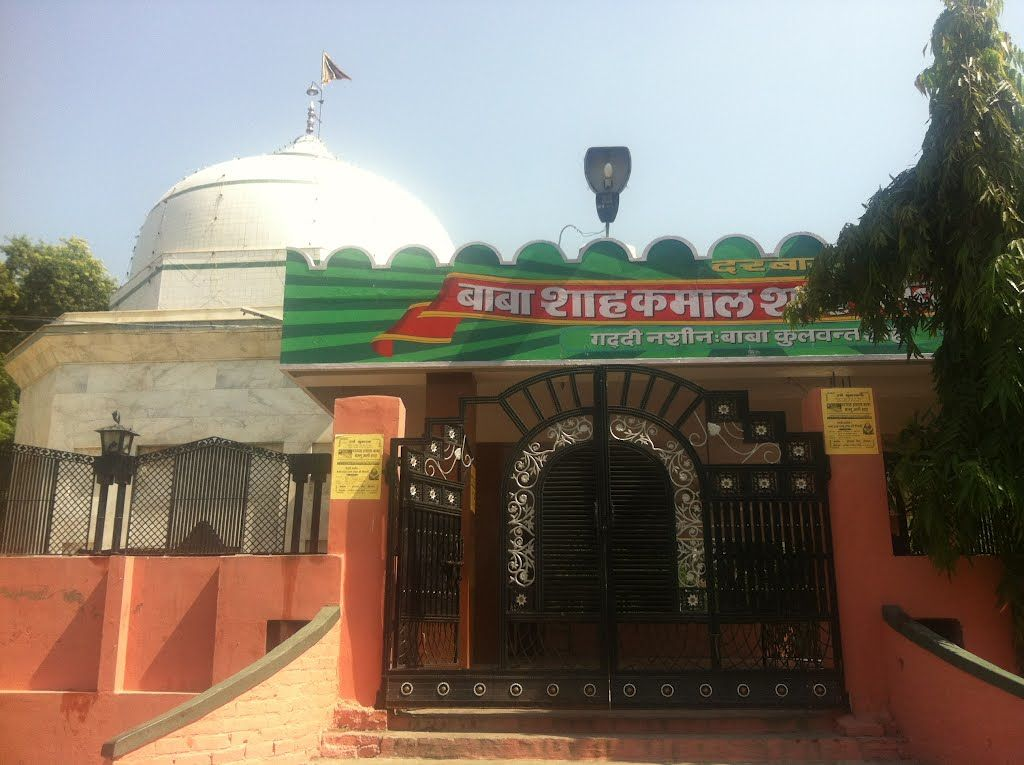
  Mazar of Shah Sikandar Qadri Kaithaly
  the grandson of Shah Kamal. The tomb is built on a square plan, a popular style of Pathan architecture. The roof is surmounted by a bulbous dome and a lotus flower finial rests on an octagonal drum-base.

Sheikh Tayyab's actual name was Lala Maidni Mal and he was one of the advisors to Mughal Emperor Akbar. He converted to Islam at the hands of Shah Kamal Qadri. His descendants from his Hindu wife are called "Qanugo" and the place where they used to live is called Mohalla "Qanugoyan" in Kaithal. There was a tradition when someone from Qanugo used to get married, they used to send one pitcher of sweet drink (sherbet) to Sheikh Tayyab masjid (also known as masjid of mirrors) and one pitcher to Shah Kamal shrine.

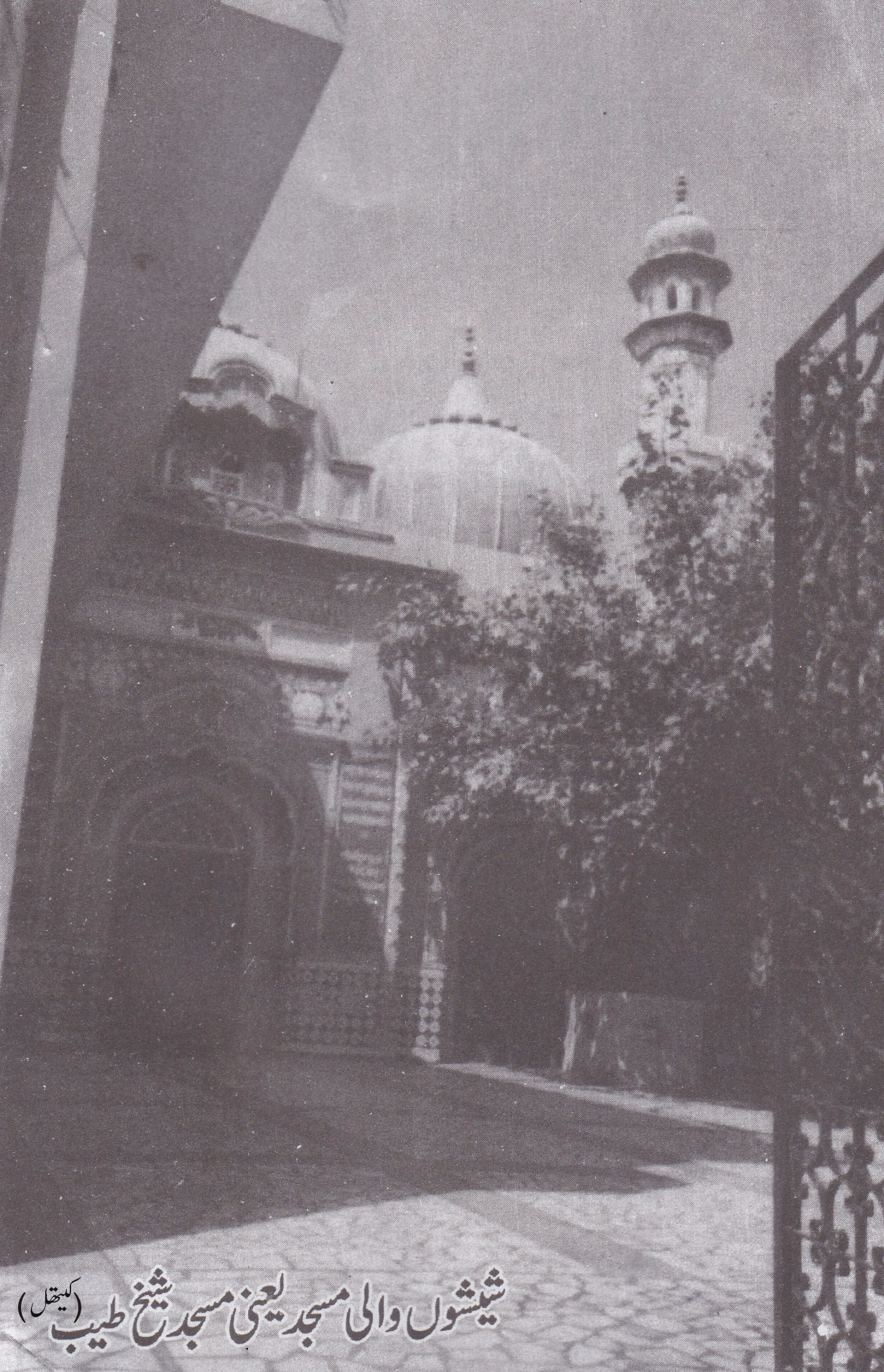
Old Picture of Masjid of Mirrors near Sheikh Tayyab Mazar

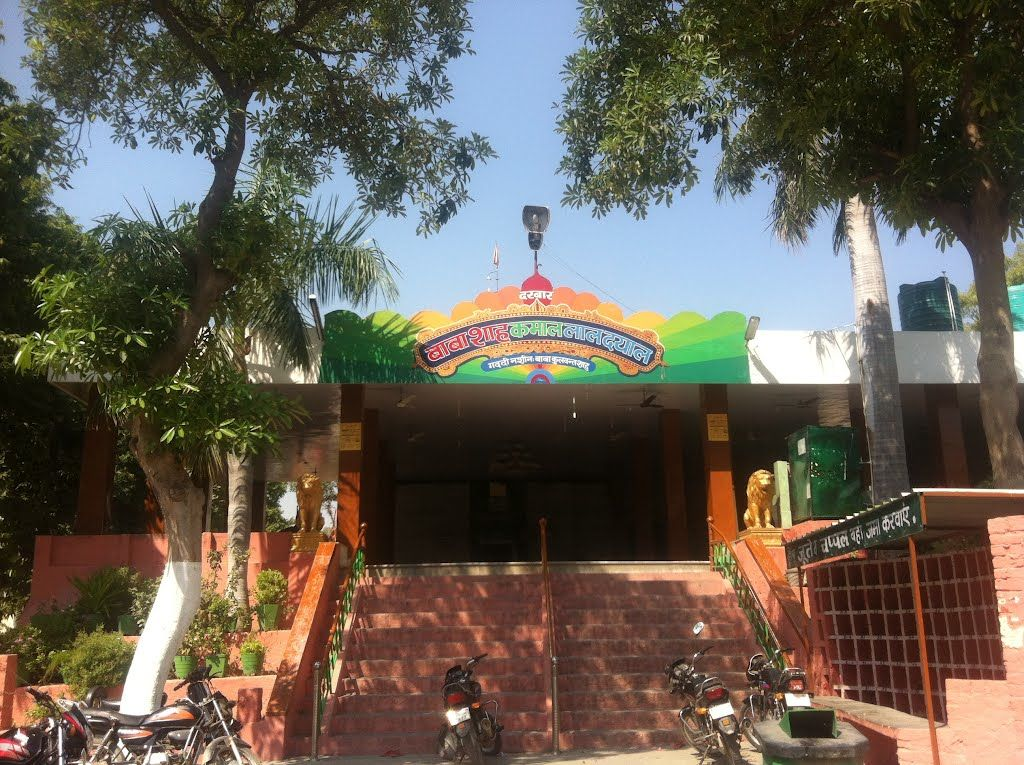
Mazar of Baba Shah Kamal Qadri Kaithaly

- Tomb of Shah Kamal Qadri and Shah Sikander Qadri (Baba Shah Kamal Lal Dayal): known as Peer Baba to visitors, situated near Gol Market. Shah Kamal Qadri's shrine is well known in sub-continent for the past 450 years. He came from Baghdad in the time of Mughal emperor Akbar.

There was a famine in the times of Shah Kamal. When he learned of it, he asked to prepare two big pots of special food (Dalya). One was prepared by a Muslim and the other one was prepared by a Hindu Brahman. It was announced that people from all over the city can come to eat day and night and take away this Dalya to their homes as well. There was a miracle that despite thousands of people eating from this langar, big pots were still filled with food. When famine ended, this food was discontinued.

After that incident, it was a tradition that every year in the month of "sawan" rainy season, on all four Thursdays of rainy season, people of every religion prepared this special food "dalya" and sent it to the Dargah of Baba Shah Kamal to be distributed among the needy.

== Transport ==
=== Rail ===
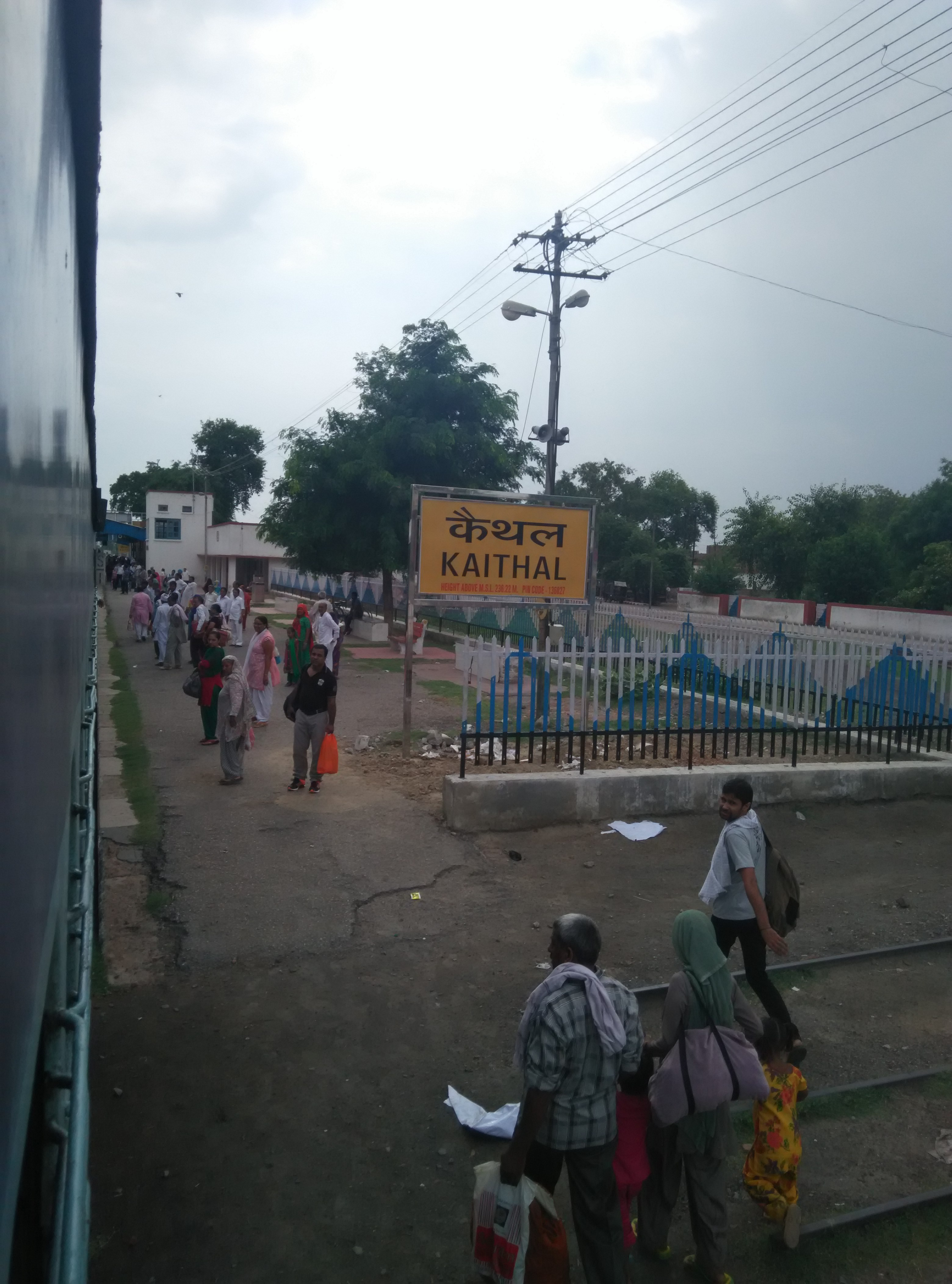
Kaithal Railway Station

The city have two railway stations named; Kaithal (KLE) and New Kaithal Halt (NKLE). The city had a rail connection to Kurukshetra and Narwana which further went to Jind (local trains only) until 2014, when the government started a rail service between Delhi and Kurukshetra via Kaithal. The move for this service was initiated and pushed by the previous Member of Parliament from Kurukshetra, Naveen Jindal with an aim to give people a convenient mode of transport to reach the capital. Earlier they had to board trains at the Kurukshetra railway station. In 2015, a new express train connecting Chandigarh and Jaipur via Kaithal has been started.

=== Road ===
The city is connected to the state capital Chandigarh through National Highway 152. SH-8 to Pundri in the east (NH 44 catches up from Karnal to Delhi).

== Educational Institutes ==
=== Universities ===
- NIILM University, Kaithal
- Maharishi Valmiki Sanskrit University

=== Colleges ===
- R.K.S.D. PG College
- R.K.S.D. College of Pharmacy
- Dr. Bhim Rao Ambedkar Govt. College
- Indira Gandhi Mahila Mahavidyalaya
- Jat College of Education
- Shri Ram College of Education
- Haryana College of Technology and Management
- College of Agriculture, Kaithal

=== Schools ===
- OSDAV Public School, Kaithal
- R.K.S.D. Public School, Kaithal
- Hindu Girls Senior Secondary School, Kaithal
- Delhi Public School, Kaithal
- Heritage International School, Kaithal
- Little Flower Visitation Convent School, Kaithal
- Indus Public School, Kaithal
- Silver Oak International School, Kaithal
- Tagore Public School, Kaithal
- Indira Gandhi Senior Secondary School, Kaithal
- Akhil Bhartiya Senior Secondary School, Kaithal
- Om Prabha Jain Senior Model School, Kaithal
- S.S. Bal Sadan senior secondary Public School, Kaithal
- Bal Vikas Public School Kalayat Kaithal
- Aarya samaj kanya ucch vidyalya, kaithal ^
- The Aryan International School, kaithal
- SUPARSHAV JAIN BAL SADAN, Kaithal

== Notable people ==
- Manoj Kumar
- Randeep Surjewala, senior Congress leader and Rajya Sabha MP
- Shamsher Singh Surjewala,

ex. MLA

== See also ==
- Haryana Tourism
- List of Monuments of National Importance in Haryana
- List of State Protected Monuments in Haryana
- List of Indus Valley Civilization sites in Haryana
- List of National Parks & Wildlife Sanctuaries of Haryana, India
- Kaithal State
- Cis-Sutlej states
- Delhi Territory
- Jind State
