= Kaithal district =

Coordinates: 29°48′00″N 76°23′24″E

- District of Haryana
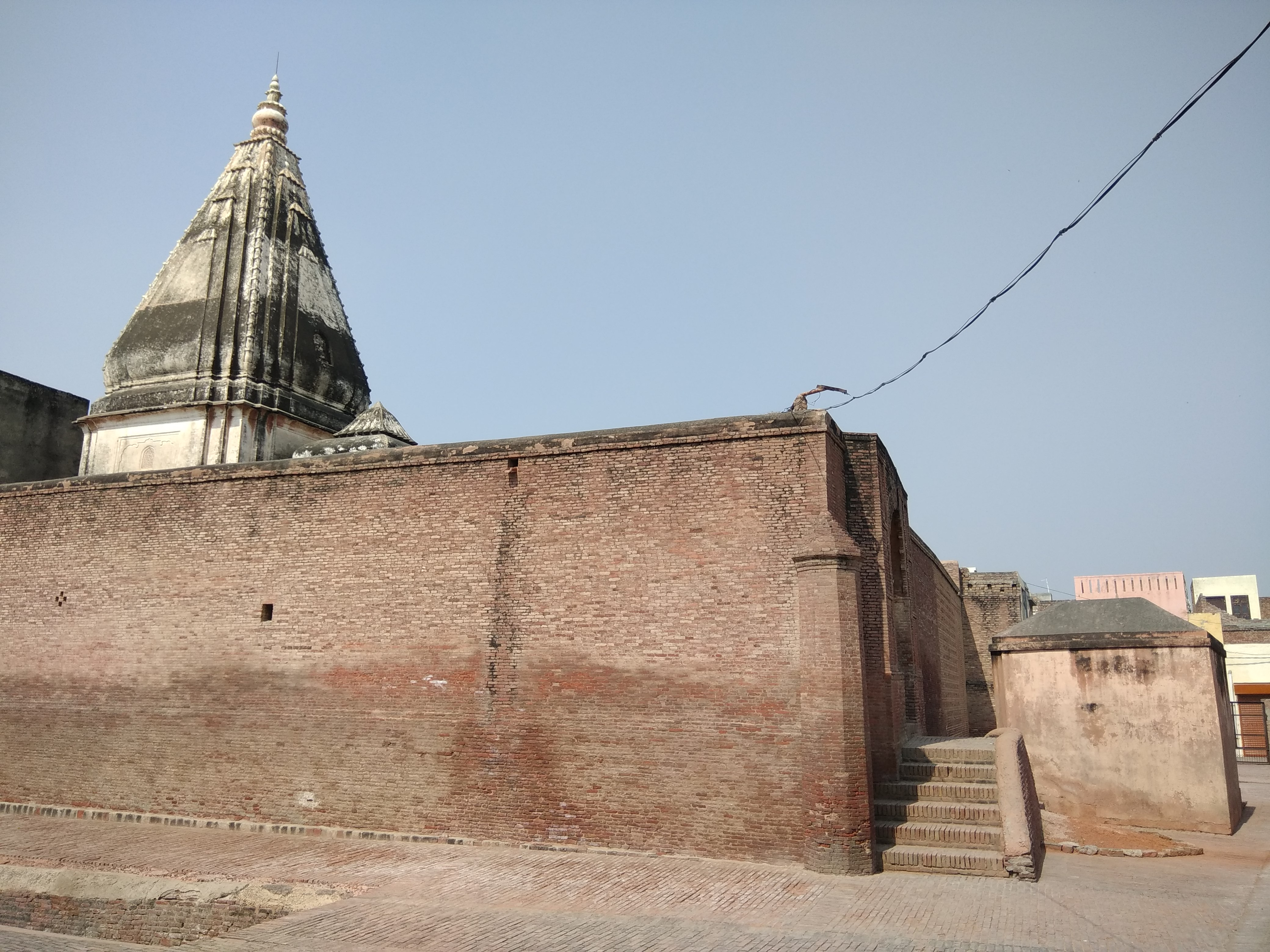
- Brick Temple in Kalayat

- Location in Haryana
- Country: India
- State: Haryana
- Division: Karnal
- Established: 1 November 1989
- Headquarters: Kaithal
- Tehsils: 1. Kaithal, 2. Guhla, 3. Pundri, 4. Kalayat

Area
  - Total: 2,317 km^{2} (895 sq mi)

Population (2011)
  - Total: 1,074,304
  - Density: 463.7/km^{2} (1,201/sq mi)
  - Urban: 19.39

Demographics
  - Sex ratio: 880 (2011 census)

Languages
  - Official: Hindi
  - Regional: Haryanvi; Puadhi
- Time zone: UTC+05:30 (IST)
- Major highways: NH-152
- Average annual precipitation: 563 mm
- Lok Sabha constituencies: Kurukshetra (shared with Kurukshetra and Yamuna Nagar districts)
- Vidhan Sabha constituencies: 4
- Website: kaithal.gov.in

Kaithal district is one of the 23 districts of Haryana, a state in northern India. Kaithal town is the district headquarters.

== History ==
This district came into existence on 1 November 1989.

=== Theh Polar archaeological site ===
Theh Polar, the ancient site from the vedic period of mahabharta, is located on the banks of Saraswati River 10 km north of Kaithal on Kaithal-Siwan road. Pulastya rishi - one of the ten Prajapati and one of the mind-born sons of Brahma and also an ancestor of Ravana, had his ashram here. The name Theh Polar is composite of Polar - corrupted version of rishi Pulastya and Theh meaning the ruined mound of an earlier habitation. The archaeological cultural artifacts found here in the partial excavation provide the evidence that this site has been inhabited for at least 3000 years since the beginning of 1st millennium BC up to the early Mughal Empire period.

There are 3 large archaeological mounds, 2 are 480x635x15.5 ft and third is 779x690x10 ft. In 1933-34, these mounds were partially excavated by H.L. Srivastava who found 465 artifacts including coins, clay seals, beads, pottery, copper vessels, etc. Earlier era punch-marked silver coins have symbols of sun, six-armed Sahasrara chakra, hills with 3 peaks. Coins of Yaudheya (5th century BCE to 4th century CD), Indo-Parthian (19-226 CE), Kushan Empire (30-375 CE), Kidara (350-390 CE), Indo-Sassanian (230-365 CE), Hindu Shahis (822-1026 CE) coins of the bull and horseman, early Mughal period copper and silver coins. The archaeological mounds at Theh Polar, 48.31 acre in size, were excavated on very small scale in 1930s, 1960, and 2013 respective, with earlier layer likely dating back to 1500-900 BCE. 1960 excavation found Painted Grey Ware culture (PGW) associated with mahabharta era. 2013 excavation found pottery, including flowerpots, toys and bricks, from Kushan Empire (1st century CE) era.

Mounds are owned and designated as protected site by Archaeological Survey of India (ASI), but highly encroached by the villagers, and efforts are on at least since 2007 to have those vacated but with no success, the site does not even have a fence.

== Administrative divisions ==
Kaithal district comprises four tehsils: Kaithal, Guhla, Pundri and Kalayat; and the three sub-tehsils of Rajaund, Dhand and Siwan. The four Haryana Vidhan Sabha constituencies located in this district are Guhla, Kalayat, Kaithal and Pundri. All of these are part of Kurukshetra Lok Sabha constituency.

== Demographics ==
Historical population
Year	Pop.	±% p.a.
1951	227,168	—
1961	334,804	+3.95%
1971	461,897	+3.27%
1981	646,566	+3.42%
1991	781,814	+1.92%
2001	946,131	+1.93%
2011	1,074,304	+1.28%

Religion in Kaithal district (2011)
Religion	Percent
Hinduism	90.71%
Sikhism	8.15%
Islam	0.77%
Other or not stated	0.37%

Languages of Kaithal district (2011)
1. Haryanvi (61.9%)
2. Hindi (26.5%)
3. Punjabi (10.4%)
4. Others (1.25%)

According to the 2011 census Kaithal district has a population of 1,074,304, roughly more than the nation of Cyprus or the US state of Rhode Island. This gives it a ranking of 423rd in India (out of a total of 640). The district has a population density of 463 inhabitants per square kilometre (1,200/sq mi) . Its population growth rate over the decade 2001-2011 was 13.39%. Kaithal has a sex ratio of 880 females for every 1000 males, and a literacy rate of 70.6%. Scheduled Castes make up 23.04% of the population.

=== Languages ===
At the time of the 2011 Census of India, 61.85% of the population in the district spoke Haryanvi, 26.48% Hindi and 10.42% Punjabi as their first language.

== See also ==
- Administrative divisions of Haryana
- Kaithal State
