= Sector 28 metro station =

Metro station in Delhi, India

Faridabad Sector 28

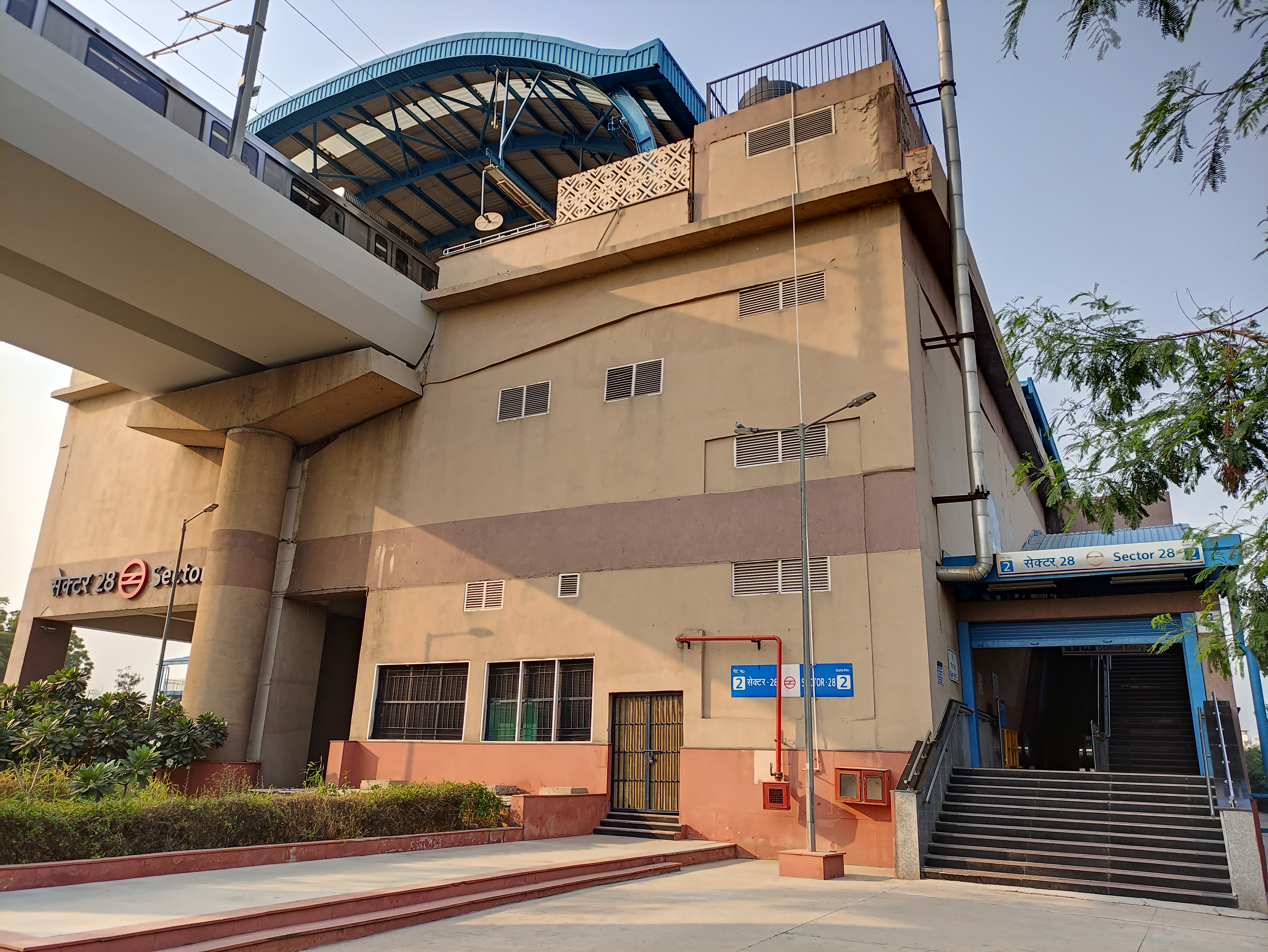

General information
- Location: Sector 28, Faridabad, Haryana,121008, India.
- Coordinates: 28°26′18″N 77°18′33″E
- System: Delhi Metro station
- Owner: Delhi Metro
- Operator: Delhi Metro Rail Corporation (DMRC)
- Line: Violet Line
- Platforms: Side platform; Platform-1 → Raja Nahar Singh (Ballabhgarh); Platform-2 → Kashmere Gate
- Tracks: 2

Construction
- Structure type: Elevated, Double-track
- Platform levels: 2
- Parking: Available
- Accessible: Yes

Other information
- Status: Staffed, Operational
- Station code: STTA

History
- Opened: 6 September 2015; 10 years ago
- Electrified: 25 kV 50 Hz AC through overhead catenary

Services
Preceding station	Delhi Metro	Following station
Mewla Maharajpur towards Kashmere Gate	Violet Line	Badkhal Mor towards Raja Nahar Singh (Ballabhgarh)
Route map
Location

Faridabad Sector 28 Metro station is an elevated station on the Violet Line of the Delhi Metro. It is located in Faridabad, Haryana. It is between Mewla Maharajpur and Badkhal Mor station on the line from 6.

== The station ==
=== Station layout ===
L2	Side platform | Doors will open on the left
L2	Platform 1 Southbound	Towards → Raja Nahar Singh (Ballabhgarh); Next Station: Badkhal Mor
L2	Platform 2 Northbound	Towards ← Kashmere Gate; Next Station: Mewla Maharajpur
L2	Side platform | Doors will open on the left
L1	Concourse	Fare control, station agent, Metro Card vending machines, crossover
G	Street Level	Exit/Entrance

=== Facilities ===
Parking is available with standard parking charges of Delhi Metro. Escalator for exit and entry are available. Near metro station McDonald's is available. For students Milestone Mania Academy is available for IIT preparation in walking distance.

== See also ==
- Delhi
- Faridabad
- Haryana
- National Highway 44 (India)
- List of Delhi Metro stations
- Transport in Delhi
- Delhi Metro Rail Corporation
- Delhi Suburban Railway
- Delhi Monorail
- Delhi Transport Corporation
- Faridabad district
- New Delhi
- National Capital Region (India)
- National Capital Region Transport Corporation
- List of rapid transit systems
- List of metro systems
