= Sarai metro station =

Metro station in Delhi, India

Sarai

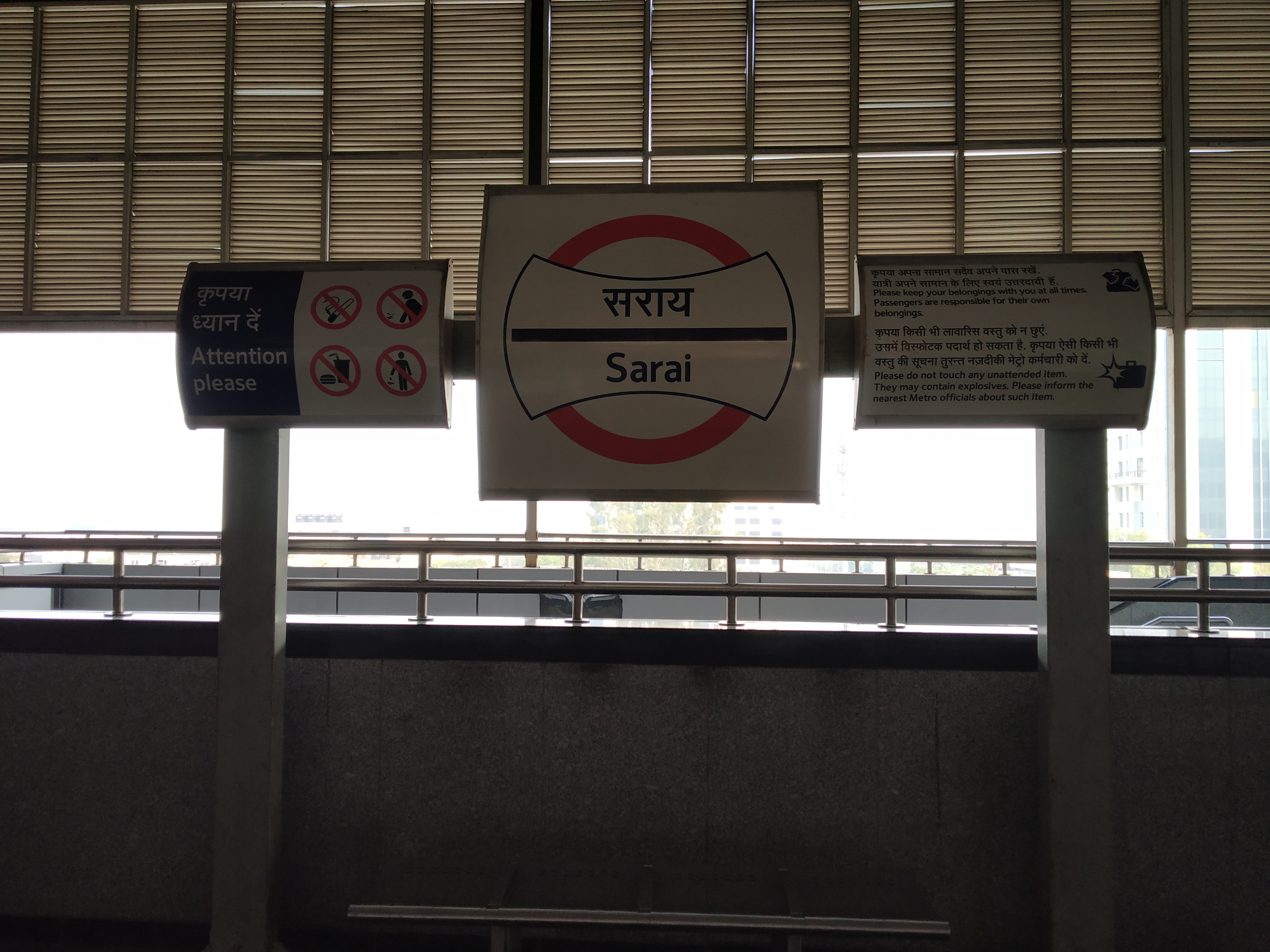

General information
- Location: Sector 27D, Faridabad, Haryana 121003
- Coordinates: 28°28′40″N 77°18′18″E
- System: Delhi Metro station
- Owner: Delhi Metro
- Operator: Delhi Metro Rail Corporation (DMRC)
- Line: Violet Line
- Platforms: Side platform; Platform-1 → Raja Nahar Singh (Ballabhgarh); Platform-2 → Kashmere Gate
- Tracks: 2

Construction
- Structure type: Elevated, Double-track
- Platform levels: 2
- Parking: Available
- Accessible: Yes

Other information
- Status: Staffed, Operational
- Station code: SRAI

History
- Opened: 6 September 2015; 10 years ago
- Electrified: 25 kV 50 Hz AC through overhead catenary

Services
Preceding station	Delhi Metro	Following station
Badarpur Border towards Kashmere Gate	Violet Line	NHPC Chowk towards Raja Nahar Singh (Ballabhgarh)
Route map
Location
- Location within Delhi

Sarai is an elevated station on the Violet Line of the Delhi Metro. It is located between Badarpur and NHPC Chowk station on the line 6 in Faridabad district of Haryana.

== The station ==
=== Station layout ===
L2	Side platform | Doors will open on the left
L2	Platform 1 Southbound	Towards → Raja Nahar Singh (Ballabhgarh); Next Station: NHPC Chowk
L2	Platform 2 Northbound	Towards ← Kashmere Gate; Next Station: Badarpur Border (Haryana-Delhi Border)
L2	Side platform | Doors will open on the left
L1	Concourse	Fare control, station agent, Metro Card vending machines, crossover
G	Street Level	Exit/Entrance

== Entry/Exit ==
Sarai metro station Entry/exits
Gate No-1	Gate No-2	Gate No-3
Vatika Towers	L&T	Crown Business Park
		Big Bazar
		Reliance Crown Mall
		Sarai Khawaja

== Connections ==
=== Buses ===
Department of State Transport Haryana runs buses between Ballabgarh Bus Stand – Panipat Ballabgarh Bus Stand – Sonipat Cyber City – Sector 37 Faridabad Medanta Medicity – Sector 37 Faridabad and bus route number CS-1A, CS-1B, CS-1C, CS-13A, CS-13B, CS-14A, CS-14B from outside metro station stop.

== See also ==
- Delhi
- Faridabad
- Haryana
- List of Delhi Metro stations
- Transport in Delhi
- Delhi Metro Rail Corporation
- Delhi Suburban Railway
- Delhi Monorail
- Delhi Transport Corporation
- Faridabad district
- New Delhi
- National Capital Region (India)
- National Capital Region Transport Corporation
- List of rapid transit systems
- List of metro systems
