= Badkhal Mor metro station =

Metro station in Delhi, India

Badkhal Mor

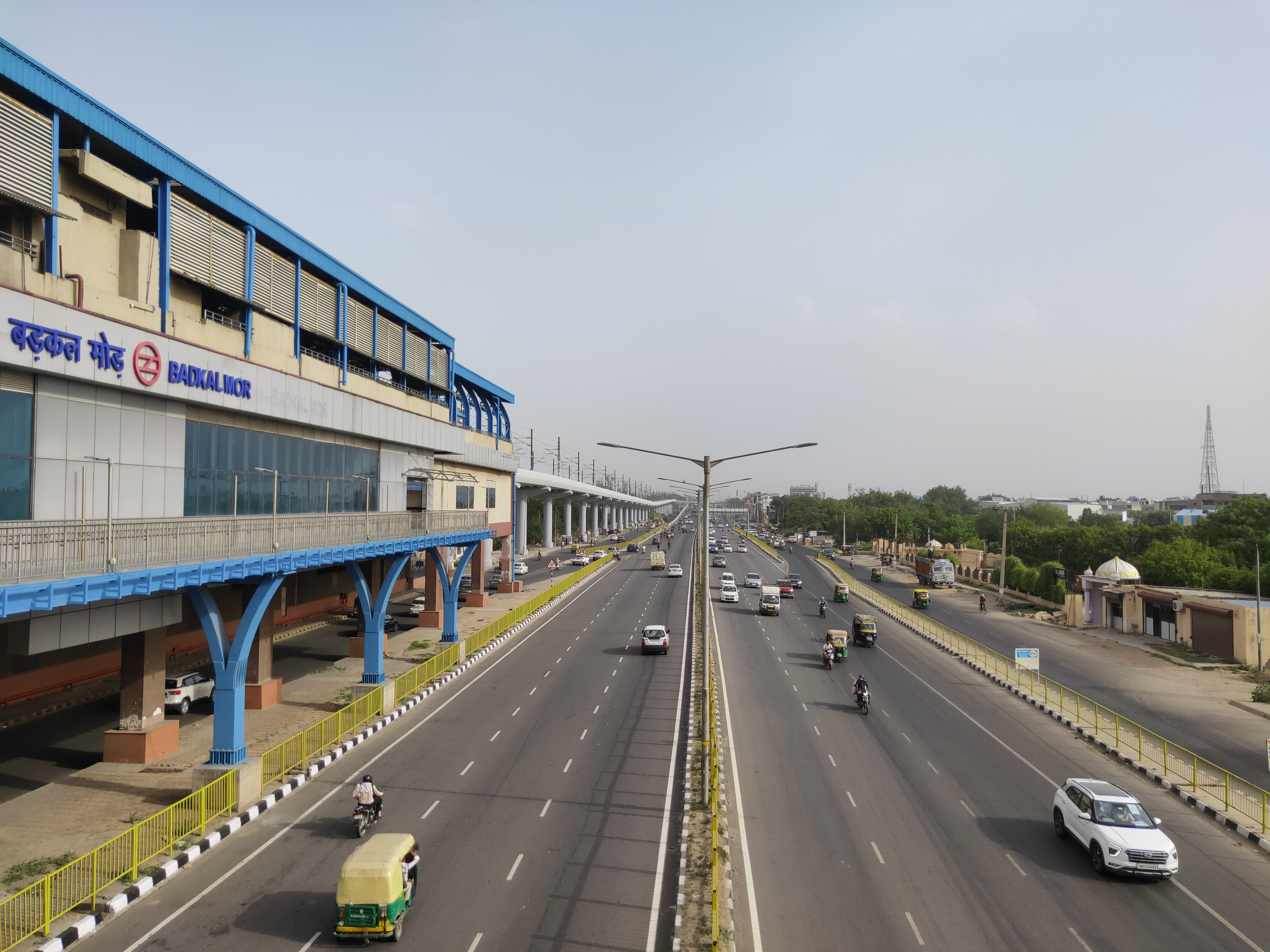

General information
- Location: Sector 19, Faridabad, Haryana 121002
- Coordinates: 28°25′22″N 77°18′37″E
- System: Delhi Metro station
- Owner: Delhi Metro
- Operator: Delhi Metro Rail Corporation (DMRC)
- Line: Violet Line
- Platforms: Side platform; Platform-1 → Raja Nahar Singh (Ballabhgarh); Platform-2 → Kashmere Gate
- Tracks: 2

Construction
- Structure type: Elevated, Double-track
- Platform levels: 2
- Accessible: Yes

Other information
- Status: Staffed, Operational
- Station code: BKMR

History
- Opened: 6 September 2015; 10 years ago
- Electrified: 25 kV 50 Hz AC through overhead catenary

Services
Preceding station	Delhi Metro	Following station
Sector 28 towards Kashmere Gate	Violet Line	Old Faridabad towards Raja Nahar Singh (Ballabhgarh)
Route map
Location

Badkhal Mor is an elevated station on the Violet Line of the Delhi Metro. It is located between Sector 28 and Old Faridabad station on the line from 6.

Manav Rachna University won the semi-naming rights to the station in June 2016, and the station was renamed as Manav Rachna Badkal Mor.

== The station ==
=== Station layout ===
L2	Side platform | Doors will open on the left
L2	Platform 1 Southbound	Towards → Raja Nahar Singh (Ballabhgarh); Next Station: Old Faridabad
L2	Platform 2 Northbound	Towards ← Kashmere Gate; Next Station: Sector 28
L2	Side platform | Doors will open on the left
L1	Concourse	Fare control, station agent, Metro Card vending machines, crossover
G	Street Level	Exit/Entrance

== Entry/Exit ==
Badkhal Mor metro station Entry/exits
Gate No-1	Gate No-2	Gate No-3

== See also ==
- Delhi
- Faridabad
- Haryana
- National Highway 44 (India)
- List of Delhi Metro stations
- Transport in Delhi
- Delhi Metro Rail Corporation
- Delhi Suburban Railway
- Delhi Monorail
- Delhi Transport Corporation
- Faridabad district
- New Delhi
- National Capital Region (India)
- National Capital Region Transport Corporation
- List of rapid transit systems
- List of metro systems
