= NHPC Chowk metro station =

Metro station in Delhi, India

NHPC Chowk

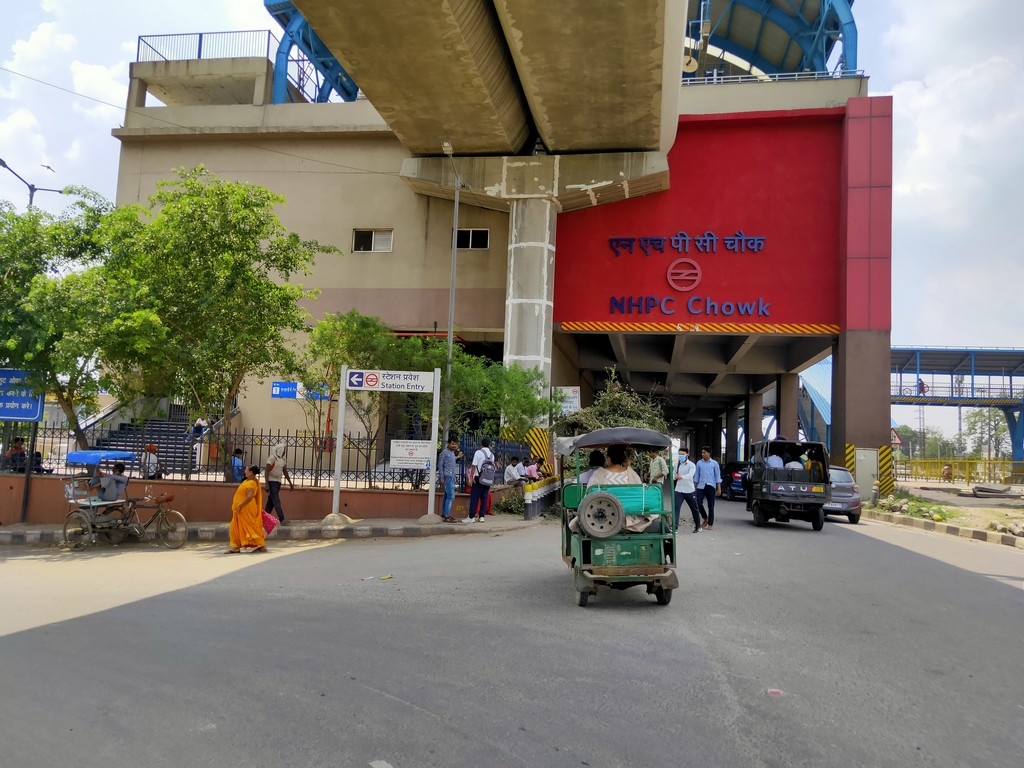

General information
- Location: Block A, DLF Industrial Area, Sector 32, Faridabad, Haryana 121003
- Coordinates: 28°27′28″N 77°18′27″E
- System: Delhi Metro station
- Owner: Delhi Metro
- Operator: Delhi Metro Rail Corporation (DMRC)
- Line: Violet Line
- Platforms: Side platform; Platform-1 → Raja Nahar Singh (Ballabhgarh); Platform-2 → Kashmere Gate
- Tracks: 2

Construction
- Structure type: Elevated, Double-track
- Platform levels: 2
- Parking: Available
- Accessible: Yes

Other information
- Status: Staffed, Operational
- Station code: NHPC

History
- Opened: 6 September 2015; 11 years ago
- Electrified: 25 kV 50 Hz AC through overhead catenary

Services
Preceding station	Delhi Metro	Following station
Sarai towards Kashmere Gate	Violet Line	Mewla Maharajpur towards Raja Nahar Singh (Ballabhgarh)
Route map
Location

NHPC Chowk is an elevated metro station on the Violet Line of the Delhi Metro, located in Faridabad, Haryana. It lies between Sarai and Mewla Maharajpur stations. The station takes its name from NHPC Limited, a public sector undertaking headquartered in Faridabad.

== The station ==
=== Station layout ===
L2	Side platform | Doors will open on the left
L2	Platform 1 Southbound	Towards → Raja Nahar Singh (Ballabhgarh); Next Station: Mewla Maharajpur
L2	Platform 2 Northbound	Towards ← Kashmere Gate; Next Station: Sarai
L2	Side platform | Doors will open on the left
L1	Concourse	Fare control, station agent, Metro Card vending machines, crossover
G	Street Level	Exit/Entrance

== Entry/Exit ==
NHPC Chowk metro station Entry/exits

Gate No-1	Gate No-2	Gate No-3
Kia Motors	Jiya Ayurveda	Motor 1 (Luxury Automative Workshop)

== See also ==
- Delhi
- Faridabad
- Haryana
- List of Delhi Metro stations
- Transport in Delhi
- Delhi Metro Rail Corporation
- Delhi Suburban Railway
- Delhi Monorail
- Delhi Transport Corporation
- Faridabad district
- New Delhi
- National Capital Region (India)
- National Capital Region Transport Corporation
- List of rapid transit systems
- List of metro systems
