= Mewla Maharajpur metro station =

Metro station in Delhi, India

Mewla Maharajpur

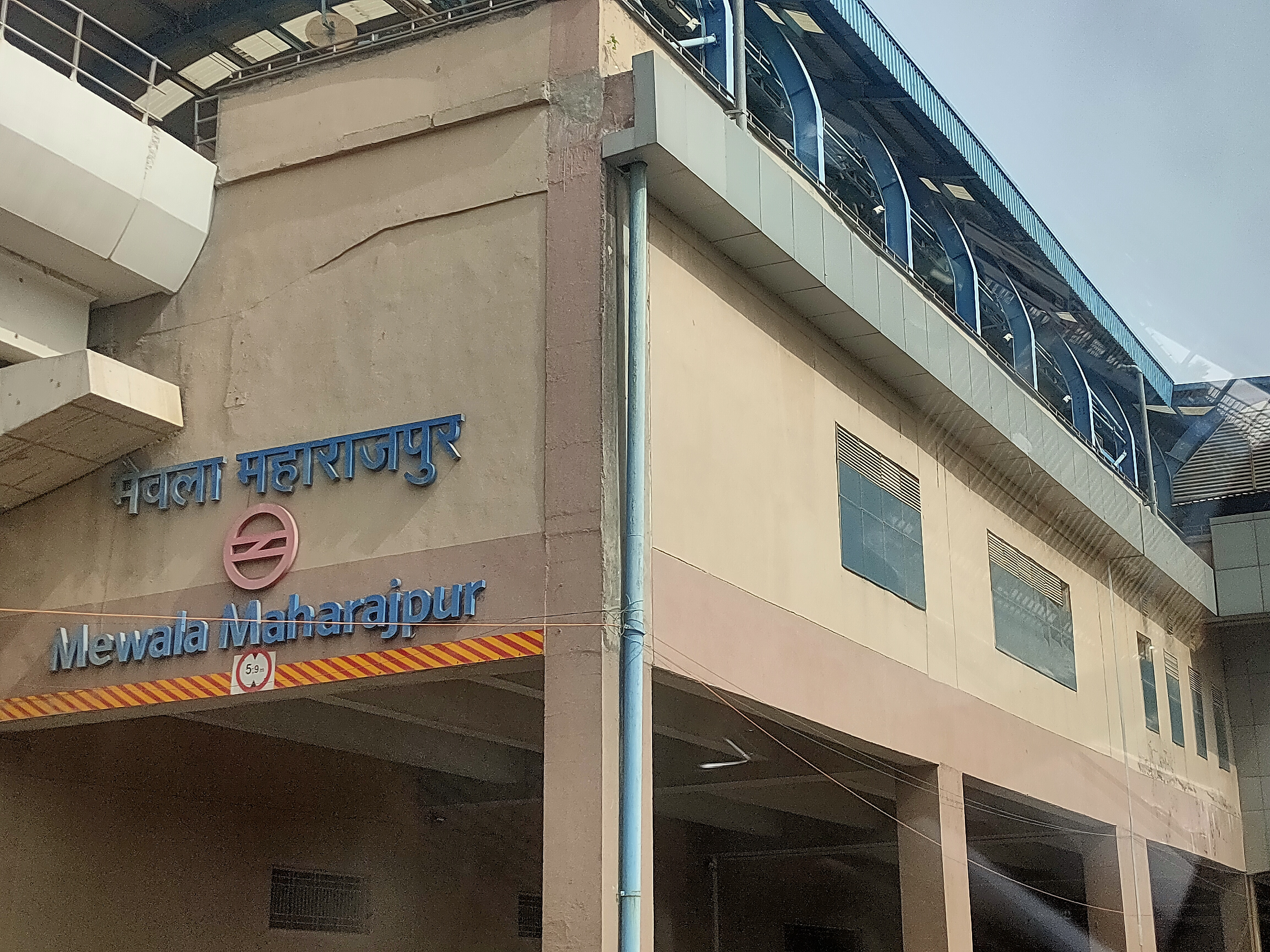

General information
- Location: Sector 31, Faridabad, Haryana 121003
- Coordinates: 28°26′55″N 77°18′29″E
- System: Delhi Metro station
- Owner: Delhi Metro
- Operator: Delhi Metro Rail Corporation (DMRC)
- Line: Violet Line
- Platforms: Side platform; Platform-1 → Raja Nahar Singh (Ballabhgarh); Platform-2 → Kashmere Gate
- Tracks: 2

Construction
- Structure type: Elevated, Double-track
- Platform levels: 2
- Parking: Available
- Accessible: Yes

Other information
- Status: Staffed, Operational
- Station code: MMJR

History
- Opened: 6 September 2015; 10 years ago
- Electrified: 25 kV 50 Hz AC through overhead catenary

Services
Preceding station	Delhi Metro	Following station
NHPC Chowk towards Kashmere Gate	Violet Line	Sector 28 towards Raja Nahar Singh (Ballabhgarh)
Route map
Location

Mewla Maharajpur is an elevated station on the Violet Line of the Delhi Metro. It is located between NHPC Chowk and Sector 28 station on the line from 6.

== The station ==
=== Station layout ===
L2	Side platform | Doors will open on the left
L2	Platform 1 Southbound	Towards → Raja Nahar Singh (Ballabhgarh); Next Station: Sector 28
L2	Platform 2 Northbound	Towards ← Kashmere Gate; Next Station: NHPC Chowk
L2	Side platform | Doors will open on the left
L1	Concourse	Fare control, station agent, Metro Card vending machines, crossover
G	Street Level	Exit/Entrance

== Entry/Exit ==
Mewla Maharajpur metro station Entry/exits
Gate No-1	Gate No-2	Gate No-3

== Monuments of Mewla ==
The chhatri and ancient water well at Mewla were both notified as the state protected monument in June 2018 to carry out the preservation work.

== See also ==
- Delhi
- Faridabad
- Haryana
- List of Delhi Metro stations
- Transport in Delhi
- Delhi Metro Rail Corporation
- Delhi Suburban Railway
- Delhi Monorail
- Delhi Transport Corporation
- Faridabad district
- New Delhi
- National Capital Region (India)
- National Capital Region Transport Corporation
- List of rapid transit systems
- List of metro systems
