= Neelam Chowk Ajronda metro station =

Metro station in Delhi, India

Neelam Chowk Ajronda

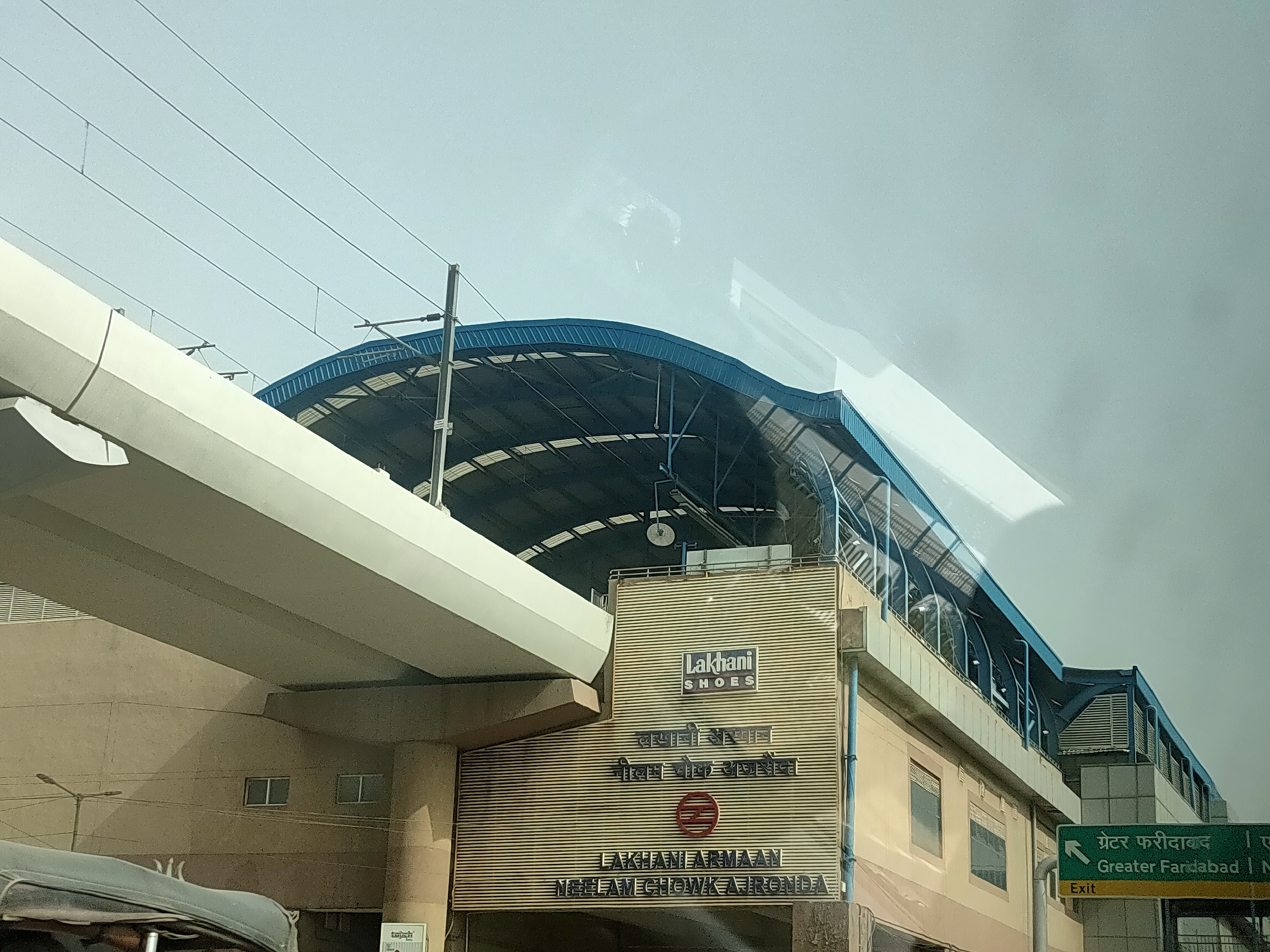
- Lakhani Armaan Neelam Chowk Ajronda metro station

General information
- Location: Mathura Road, Sector 15A, Faridabad, Haryana 121013
- Coordinates: 28°23′52″N 77°18′45″E
- System: Delhi Metro station
- Owner: Delhi Metro
- Operator: Delhi Metro Rail Corporation (DMRC)
- Line: Violet Line
- Platforms: Side platform; Platform-1 → Raja Nahar Singh (Ballabhgarh); Platform-2 → Kashmere Gate
- Tracks: 2

Construction
- Structure type: Elevated, Double-track
- Platform levels: 2
- Parking: Available
- Accessible: Yes

Other information
- Status: Staffed, Operational
- Station code: NCAJ

History
- Opened: 6 September 2015; 10 years ago
- Electrified: 25 kV 50 Hz AC through overhead catenary

Services
Preceding station	Delhi Metro	Following station
Old Faridabad towards Kashmere Gate	Violet Line	Bata Chowk towards Raja Nahar Singh (Ballabhgarh)
Route map
Location

Neelam Chowk Ajronda is an elevated station on the Violet Line of the Delhi Metro. It is located between Old Faridabad and Bata Chowk stations on line 6.

== Station layout ==
L2	Side platform | Doors will open on the left
L2	Platform 1 Southbound	Towards → Raja Nahar Singh (Ballabhgarh); Next Station: Bata Chowk
L2	Platform 2 Northbound	Towards ← Kashmere Gate; Next Station: Old Faridabad
L2	Side platform | Doors will open on the left
L1	Concourse	Fare control, station agent, Metro Card vending machines, crossover
G	Street Level	Exit/Entrance

== Entry/Exit ==
Neelam Chowk Ajronda metro station Entry/exits
Gate No-1	Gate No-2	Gate No-3

== See also ==
- Delhi
- Faridabad
- Haryana
- National Highway 44 (India)
- List of Delhi Metro stations
- Transport in Delhi
- Delhi Metro Rail Corporation
- Delhi Suburban Railway
- Delhi Monorail
- Delhi Transport Corporation
- Faridabad district
- New Delhi
- National Capital Region (India)
- National Capital Region Transport Corporation
- List of rapid transit systems
- List of metro systems
