= Sant Surdas (Sihi) metro station =

Metro station in Delhi, India

Sant Surdas (Sihi)

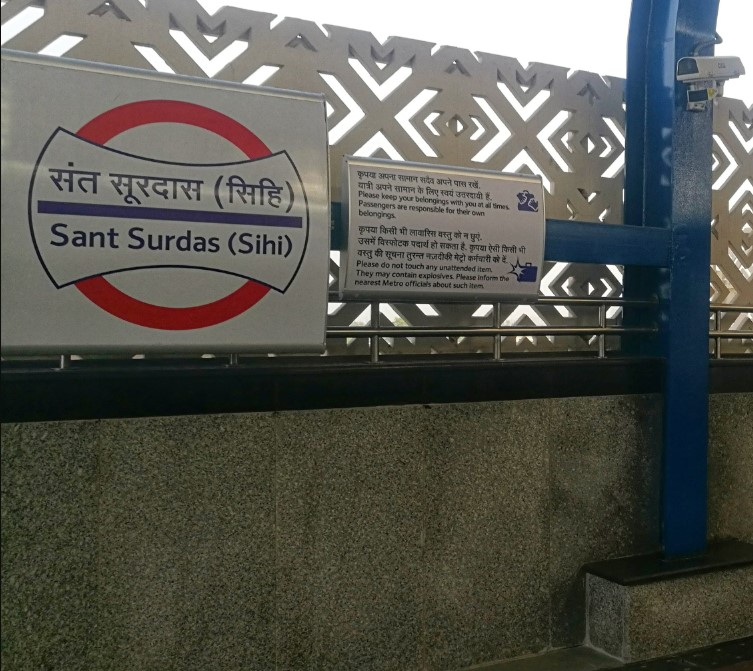

General information
- Location: Sector 6, Faridabad, Haryana 121006
- Coordinates: 28°21′17″N 77°18′58″E
- System: Delhi Metro station
- Owner: Delhi Metro
- Operator: Delhi Metro Rail Corporation (DMRC)
- Line: Violet Line
- Platforms: side platform; Platform-1 → Raja Nahar Singh (Ballabhgarh); Platform-2 → Kashmere Gate
- Tracks: 2

Construction
- Structure type: Elevated, Double-track
- Platform levels: 2
- Parking: Not Available
- Accessible: Yes

Other information
- Status: Staffed, Operational
- Station code: NCBC

History
- Opened: 19 November 2018; 7 years ago
- Electrified: 25 kV 50 Hz AC through overhead catenary
- Former names: NCB colony (Good Year)

Services
Preceding station	Delhi Metro	Following station
Escorts Mujesar towards Kashmere Gate	Violet Line	Raja Nahar Singh towards Raja Nahar Singh (Ballabhgarh)
Route map
Location

The Sant Surdas (Sihi) metro station (formerly known as NCB Colony (Good Year) metro station) is located on the Violet Line of the Delhi Metro in Faridabad, Haryana.

== History ==
As part of Phase III of the extension of Delhi Metro, Sant Surdas (Sihi) is the extension of Violet Line. It was opened on 19 November 2018 for public use.

== Station layout ==
L2	Side platform | Doors will open on the left
L2	Platform 1 Southbound	Towards → Raja Nahar Singh (Ballabhgarh)
L2	Platform 2 Northbound	Towards ← Kashmere Gate; Next Station: Escorts Mujesar
L2	Side platform | Doors will open on the left
L1	Concourse	Fare control, station agent, Metro Card vending machines, crossover
G	Street Level	Exit/Entrance

== Entry/Exit ==
Sant Surdas (Sihi) metro station Entry/exits
Gate No-1	Gate No-2	Gate No-3

== See also ==
- Delhi
- Faridabad
- Haryana
- National Highway 44 (India)
- List of Delhi Metro stations
- Transport in Delhi
- Delhi Metro Rail Corporation
- Delhi Suburban Railway
- Delhi Monorail
- Delhi Transport Corporation
- Faridabad district
- New Delhi
- National Capital Region (India)
- National Capital Region Transport Corporation
- List of rapid transit systems
- List of metro systems
