= Ballabhgarh railway station =

Train station in Haryana, India

Ballabhgarh
- Indian Railways logo

General information
- Location: Ballabhgarh, Faridabad district, Haryana; India
- Coordinates: 28°20′32″N 77°19′32″E
- Elevation: 204 metres (669 ft)
- System: Express train and Passenger train station
- Owner: Ministry of Railways (India)
- Operator: Indian Railways
- Lines: New Delhi–Mumbai main line, New Delhi–Agra chord
- Platforms: 5
- Tracks: 10
- Connections: Violet Line Raja Nahar Singh

Construction
- Structure type: At grade
- Parking: Yes
- Accessible: Available

Other information
- Status: Functioning
- Station code: BVH
- Zone(s): Northern Railway
- Division(s): Delhi

History
- Electrified: 1982–85
Location
- Location within Haryana Location within India

Ballabhgarh Railway Station is a railway station is in Ballabhgarh, Faridabad district, Haryana. Its code is BVH. It is fall under Northern Railway zone's Delhi railway division. It serves Faridabad and surrounding areas. The station consists of 5 platforms.

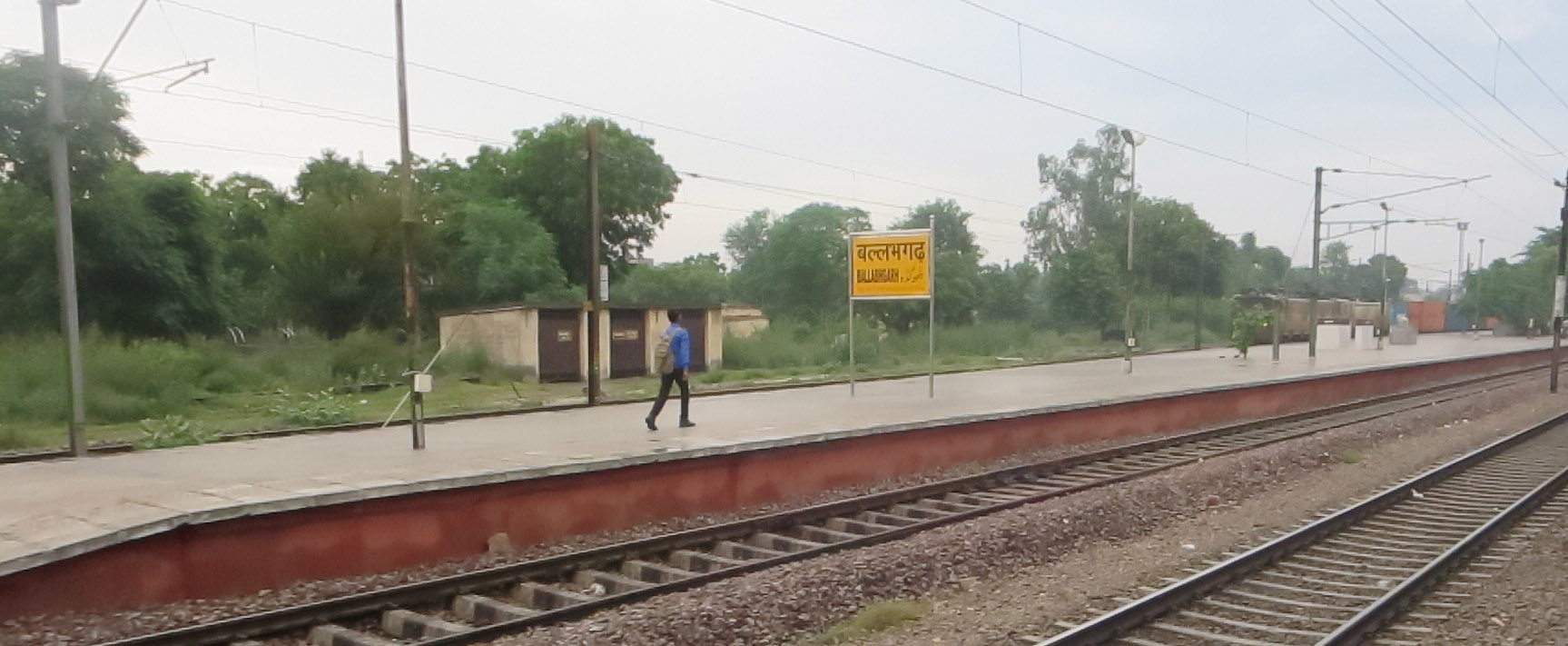
Ballabhgarh railway station

== Suburban railway ==
Ballabhgarh is part of the Delhi Suburban Railway and is served by EMU trains.

== Electrification ==
The Faridabad–Mathura–Agra section was electrified in 1982–85.
