= Lal Qila metro station =

Metro station in Chandni Chowk, Delhi, India

Lal Quila

General information
- Location: Netaji Subhash Marg, Chandni Chowk, Old Delhi, Delhi, 110006
- Coordinates: 28°39′24″N 77°14′12″E
- System: Delhi Metro station
- Owner: Delhi Metro
- Operator: Delhi Metro Rail Corporation (DMRC)
- Line: Violet Line
- Platforms: Island platform; Platform-1 → Raja Nahar Singh (Ballabhgarh); Platform-2 → Kashmere Gate
- Tracks: 2

Construction
- Structure type: Underground, Double-track
- Platform levels: 2
- Accessible: Yes

Other information
- Station code: LLQA

History
- Opened: 28 May 2017; 9 years ago
- Electrified: 25 kV 50 Hz AC through overhead catenary

Services
Preceding station	Delhi Metro	Following station
Kashmere Gate Terminus	Violet Line	Jama Masjid towards Raja Nahar Singh (Ballabhgarh)
Route map
Location

Lal Qila (also spelled Lal Quila), or Red Fort, is an underground metro station on the Violet Line of the Delhi Metro, located beneath Netaji Subhash Marg in the Chandni Chowk area of Old Delhi. The station serves the nearby Red Fort, a UNESCO World Heritage Site that served as the principal residence of the Mughal emperors for nearly 200 years. It commenced passenger operations on 28 May 2017 as part of the ITO–Kashmere Gate extension, popularly known as the Heritage Line. The adjacent stations are Kashmere Gate to the north and Jama Masjid to the south.

== Layout and facilities ==
=== Station layout ===
G	Street level	Exit/ Entrance
C	Concourse	Fare control, station agent, Ticket/token, shops
P	Platform 1 Southbound	Towards → Raja Nahar Singh (Ballabhgarh); Next Station: Jama Masjid
P	Island platform | Doors will open on the right
P	Platform 2 Northbound	Towards ← Kashmere Gate Change at the next station for Red Line or Yellow Line

== Connections ==
=== Bus ===
Delhi Transport Corporation bus routes number 114ST+901, 214, 214CL, 261, 347, 348, 402CL, 403CL, 405, 405A, 405STL, 425, 429CL, 605, 729, 807A serves the station from Red Fort bus stop.

== Entry/Exit ==
Lal Qila metro station Entry/exits
Gate No-1	Gate No-2	Gate No-3	Gate No-4
Chandni Chowk	Old Delhi Railway Station	Yamuna Bazar	Red Fort

== Attack ==
On 10 November 2025, at approximately 6:52 pm, an explosion occurred in a moving Hyundai i20 car near Gate No. 1 of Lal Qila Metro station. The explosion killed 15 people and injured more than 20 others. The incident was subsequently treated as a terrorist attack and investigated by the National Investigation Agency (NIA).

== See also ==
- 2025 Delhi car explosion, near the metro station
- Lal Quila Express, passenger train in India
- Chandni Chowk metro station (Delhi)
- List of Delhi Metro stations
- Transport in Delhi
- Delhi Suburban Railway
- Delhi Monorail
- Central Delhi
- National Capital Region (India)
- List of rapid transit systems
- List of metro systems
