= Old Faridabad metro station =

Metro station in Delhi, India

Old Faridabad

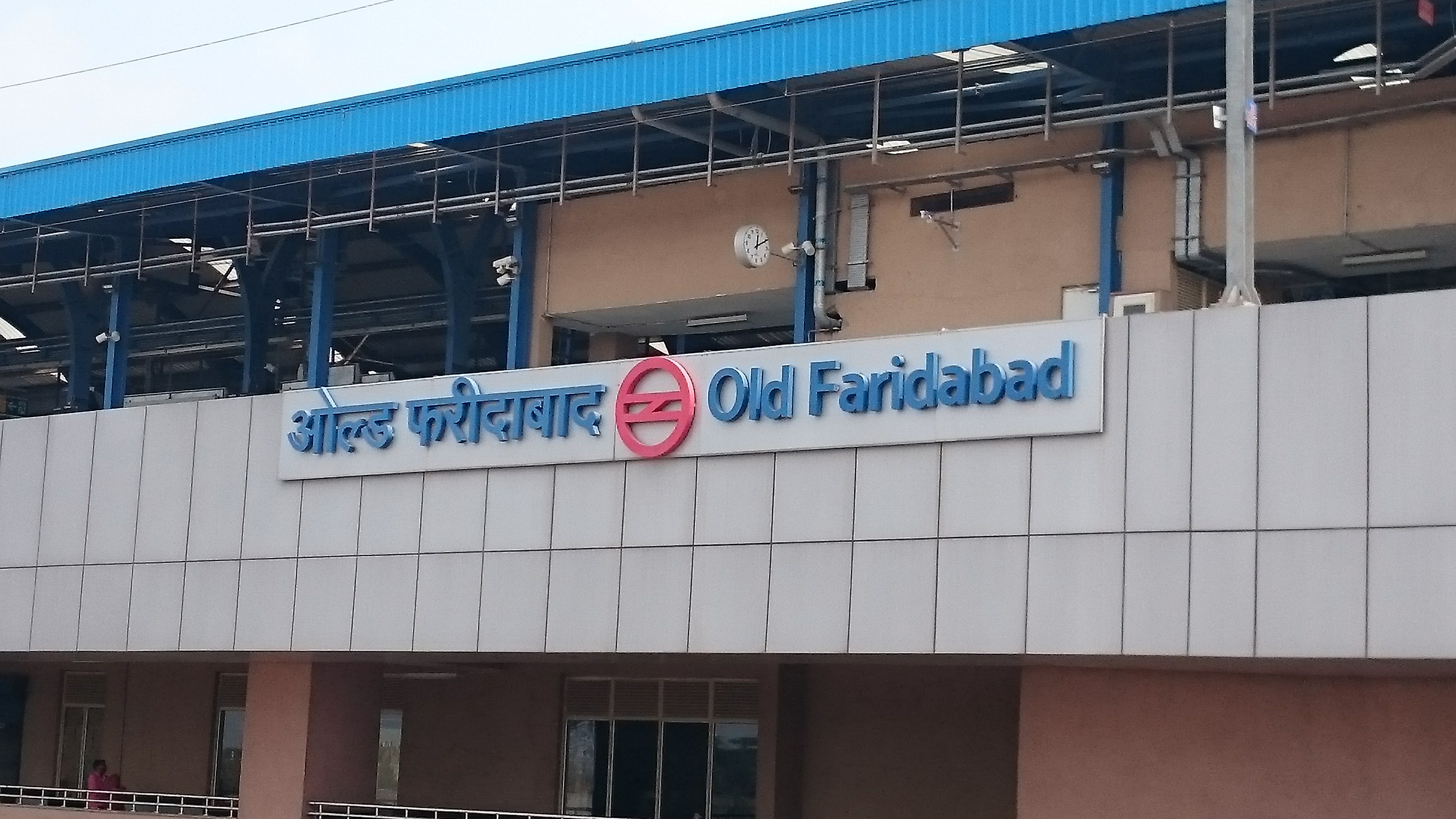
- Faridabad Old metro station

General information
- Location: Sector 16A, Faridabad, Delhi–Mathura Rd. Haryana 121002
- Coordinates: 28°24′39″N 77°18′41″E
- System: Delhi Metro station
- Owner: Delhi Metro
- Operator: Delhi Metro Rail Corporation (DMRC)
- Line: Violet Line
- Platforms: Side platform; Platform-1 → Raja Nahar Singh (Ballabhgarh); Platform-2 → Kashmere Gate; Platform-3 → Train Terminates
- Tracks: 3
- Connections: Faridabad

Construction
- Structure type: Elevated, Double-track
- Platform levels: 2
- Parking: Available
- Accessible: Yes

Other information
- Status: Staffed, Operational
- Station code: OFDB

History
- Opened: 6 September 2015; 10 years ago
- Electrified: 25 kV 50 Hz AC through overhead catenary

Services
Preceding station	Delhi Metro	Following station
Badkhal Mor towards Kashmere Gate	Violet Line	Neelam Chowk Ajronda towards Raja Nahar Singh (Ballabhgarh)
Route map
Location

Old Faridabad is an elevated station on the Violet Line of the Delhi Metro. It is located between Badkhal Mor and Neelam Chowk Ajronda station on Line 6 (Violet Line).

This metro station is closest to Faridabad railway station.

== Station layout ==
L2	Side platform | Doors will open on the left
L2	Platform 1 Southbound	Towards → Raja Nahar Singh (Ballabhgarh); Next Station: Neelam Chowk Ajronda
L2	Platform 2 Northbound	Towards ← Kashmere Gate; Next Station: Badkhal Mor
L2	Side platform | Doors will open on the left
L1	Concourse	Fare control, station agent, Metro Card vending machines, crossover
G	Street level	Exit/Entrance

== Facilities ==
The station has ticket vending machines, Sulabh Sochalaya (washroom) and a Milk booth.

== Connections ==
Faridabad railway station of the Indian Railways network situated nearby. Faridabad is part of the Delhi Suburban Railway and is served by local trains. This stations serves the areas of Old Faridabad and nearby areas including Sector 16, 17, 18. The station is also served by local autos and rickshaw for nearby connectivity.

== Entry/exit ==
Old Faridabad metro station Entry/exits
Gate No-1	Gate No-2	Gate No-3

== See also ==
- Transport in Delhi
  - National Highway 44 (India)
  - List of Delhi Metro stations
  - Delhi Suburban Railway
  - Delhi Monorail
- National Capital Region (India)
  - National Capital Region Transport Corporation
- List of rapid transit systems
  - List of metro systems
