= Neharpar =

Greater Faridabad
- Location within Haryana Location within India
- Coordinates: 28.4211°N 77.3078°E
- Country: India
- State: Haryana
- District: Faridabad

Government
  - Chief Minister of Haryana: Nayab singh saini
  - Commissioner: Ashok Kumar Sharma
  - Mayor: Ashok Arora
- Elevation: 198 m (650 ft)

Languages
  - Official: Hindi
  - Regional: Haryanvi
- Time zone: UTC+5:30 (IST)
- PIN: 121007
- Telephone code: 0129

Neharpar also known as Greater Faridabad refers to newly developed Sectors 66 to 89 in Faridabad, Haryana, India. Sector 66 to 74 are Industrial Sectors whereas Sector 75 to 89 are Residential Sectors. This area is being developed new, and hence boast of wide roads, tall buildings, malls, educational institutions, and commercial centers. This area is also referred to as Greater Faridabad. Faridabad has a huge amount of central funding coming from Jawaharlal Nehru National Urban Renewal Mission (JnNURM).

Greater Faridabad area has some of the renowned educational institute of the city including Modern DPS school, Shiv nadar School. Apart from educational institutes, this area hosts the Asia's largest medical institute Amrita Hospital with a capacity of more than 2600 beds; 81 specialties which was inaugurated by Indian Prime Minister Narendra Modi on 28 August 2022.

Omaxe World Street is the largest shopping complex of the area with facilities of food court, gaming area, smart offices and includes an attractive for major night out pubs.
