= Violet Line (Delhi Metro) =

Line on the Delhi Metro system

Violet Line (Line 6)
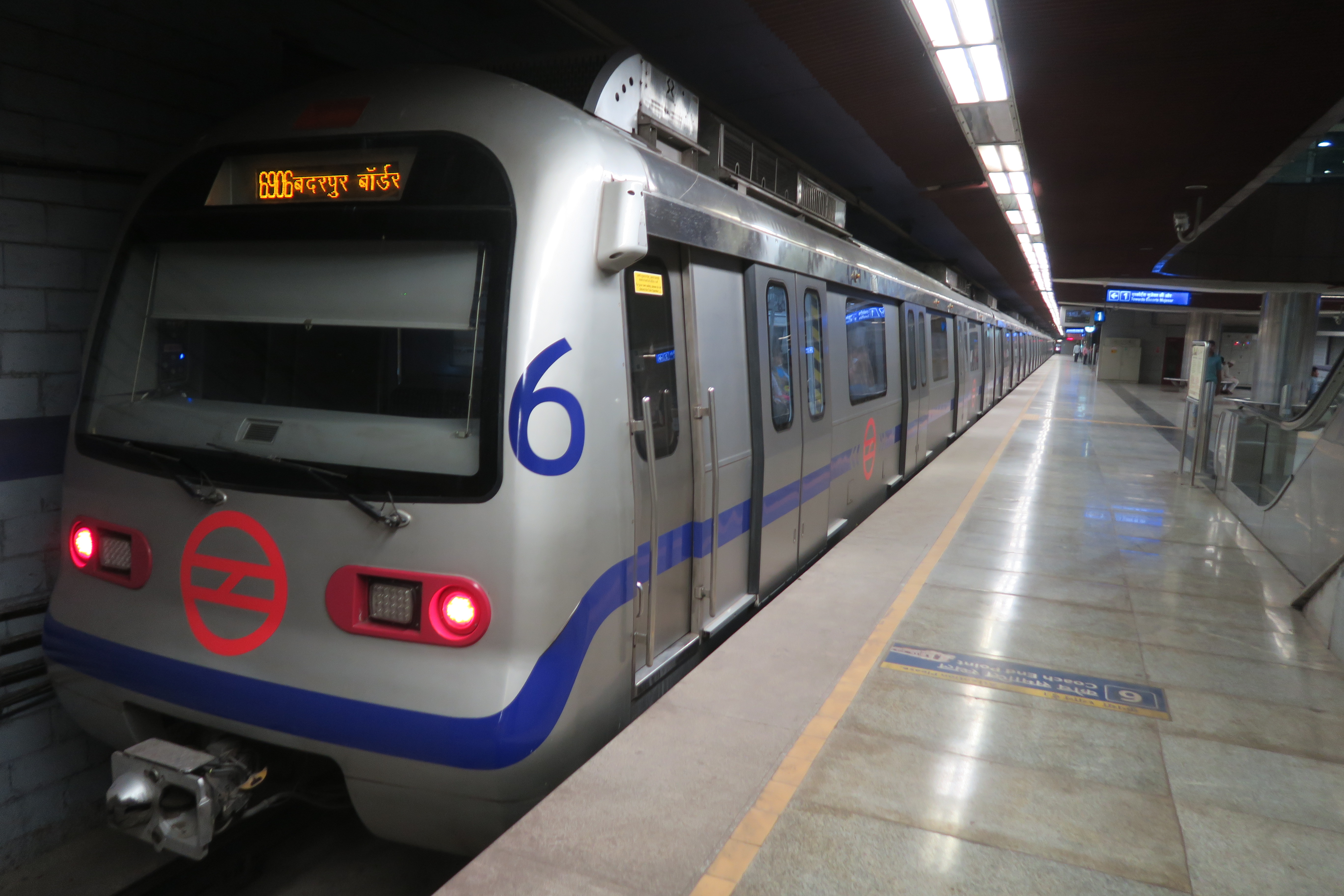
- Fleets of Violet line supplied by Mitsubishi. Here, a train leaves from JLN Stadium metro station.

Overview
- Status: Operational
- Owner: DMRC
- Locale: Delhi and Faridabad
- Termini: Kashmere Gate; Raja Nahar Singh
- Stations: 34

Service
- Type: Rapid transit
- System: Delhi Metro
- Operator: Delhi Metro Rail Corporation
- Rolling stock: Mitsubishi–Hyundai Rotem–BEML standard gauge
- Daily ridership: 602,919 (May 2026)

History
- Opened: 3 October 2010; 16 years ago
- Last extension: 19 November 2018

Technical
- Line length: 46.34 kilometres (28.79 mi)
- Character: Underground and Elevated
- Track gauge: 1,435 mm (4 ft 8 1/2 in) standard gauge
- Electrification: 25 kV 50 Hz AC from overhead catenary

The Violet Line (Line 6) is a rapid transit metro line of the Delhi Metro in Delhi, India. The line connects Kashmere Gate station in New Delhi with Raja Nahar Singh in Ballabhgarh via Faridabad. The line consists of 34 metro stations with a total length of 46.34 kilometres (28.79 mi).

This line acts as a parallel link for those who travel in the heavily used Yellow Line and connects the interior parts of South Delhi, and a little of Central Delhi to the satellite town of Faridabad. The stretch between ITO metro station and Kashmere Gate metro station is popularly known as the Heritage Line.

== History ==
The Violet Line was originally planned to open in March 2010. On 12 July 2009, a portion of an under-construction bridge collapsed when its cantilever pier collapsed on load of launching girder at Zamrudpur, near East of Kailash, on the Central Secretariat – Badarpur corridor. Six people were killed and 15 others injured. The day after, on 13 July 2009, a crane that was removing the debris collapsed, and with a bowling pin effect knocking down two other nearby cranes, injuring six.

An extension from the Badarpur metro station of the line was opened on 6 September 2015 to provide connectivity to the neighbouring satellite city of Faridabad. This is the second line to cross the Delhi-Haryana border after the Yellow Line to Gurgaon. This extension runs fully elevated for 13.87 km (8.62 mi) and has 9 stations.

A further extension to Ballabhgarh (Raja Nahar Singh metro station) was opened on 19 November 2018.
The following dates represent the dates the section opened to the public, not the private inauguration.

History
Phase	Extension date	Termini		Length	Stations
II	3 October 2010	Central Secretariat	Sarita Vihar	15.34 kilometers (9.53 mi)	13
II	14 January 2011	Sarita Vihar	Badarpur Border	4.82 kilometers (3.00 mi)	3
III	26 June 2014	Mandi House	Central Secretariat	3.23 kilometers (2.01 mi)	2
III	8 June 2015	Mandi House	ITO	0.97 kilometers (0.60 mi)	1
III	6 September 2015	Badarpur Border	Escorts Mujesar	13.56 kilometers (8.43 mi)	9
III	28 May 2017	Kashmere Gate	ITO	5.07 kilometers (3.15 mi)	4
III	19 November 2018	Escorts Mujesar	Raja Nahar Singh	3.35 kilometers (2.08 mi)	2
Total		Kashmere Gate	Raja Nahar Singh	46.34 kilometers (28.79 mi)	34

The depot is in Sarita Vihar adjacent to Mohan Estate metro station as a part of Phase-II of the Delhi Metro Network of the Violet Line, and in Ajronda adjacent to Neelam Chowk Ajronda metro station as a part of Phase-III of the Delhi Metro Network of the Violet Line.

== Stations ==
Violet Line
#	Station Name		Phase	Opening	Interchange Connection	Station Layout	Platform Level Type
#	English	Hindi	Phase	Opening	Interchange Connection	Station Layout	Platform Level Type
1	Kashmere Gate	कश्मीरी गेट	III	28 May 2017	Red Line; Yellow Line; Kashmere Gate ISBT	Underground	Island
2	Lal Qila	लाल क़िला	III	28 May 2017	None	Underground	Island
3	Jama Masjid	जामा मस्जिद	III	28 May 2017	None	Underground	Island
4	Delhi Gate	दिल्ली गेट	III	28 May 2017	Magenta Line (Phase IV - Under Construction)	Underground	Island
5	ITO	आईटीओ	III	8 June 2015	None	Underground	Island
6	Mandi House	मण्डी हाउस	III	26 June 2014	Blue Line	Underground	Island
7	Janpath	जनपथ	III	26 June 2014	None	Underground	Island
8	Central Secretariat	केन्द्रीय सचिवालय	II	3 October 2010	Yellow Line; Magenta Line (Phase V(A) – Approved)	Underground	Side
9	Khan Market	ख़ान मार्किट	II	3 October 2010	None	Underground	Island
10	Jawaharlal Nehru Stadium	जवाहर लाल नेहरू स्टेडियम	II	3 October 2010	None	Underground	Island
11	Jangpura	जंगपुरा	II	3 October 2010	Delhi-Meerut RRTS	Underground	Island
12	Lajpat Nagar	लाजपत नगर	II	3 October 2010	Pink Line; Golden Line (Phase IV - Under Construction)	Elevated	Side
13	Moolchand	मूलचन्द	II	3 October 2010	None	Elevated	Side
14	Kailash Colony	कैलाश कॉलोनी	II	3 October 2010	None	Elevated	Side
15	Nehru Place	नेहरू प्लेस	II	3 October 2010	None	Elevated	Side
16	Kalkaji Mandir	कालकाजी मंदिर	II	3 October 2010	Magenta Line	Elevated	Side
17	Govindpuri	गोविन्दपुरी	II	3 October 2010	None	Elevated	Side
18	Harkesh Nagar Okhla	हरकेश नगर ओखला	II	3 October 2010	None	Elevated	Side
19	Jasola Apollo	जसोला अपोलो	II	3 October 2010	None	Elevated	Side
20	Sarita Vihar	सरिता विहार	II	3 October 2010	None	Elevated	Side
21	Mohan Estate	मोहन एस्टेट	II	14 January 2011	None	Elevated	Side
22	Tughlakabad Station	तुग़लकाबाद स्टेशन	II	14 January 2011	Golden Line (Phase IV - Under Construction); Tughlakabad	Elevated	Side
23	Badarpur Border	बदरपुर बॉर्डर	II	14 January 2011	None	Elevated	Side
24	Sarai	सराय	III	6 September 2015	None	Elevated	Side
25	NHPC Chowk	एनएचपीसी चौक	III	6 September 2015	None	Elevated	Side
26	Mewla Maharajpur	मेवला महाराजपुर	III	6 September 2015	None	Elevated	Side
27	Sector 28	सेक्टर 28	III	6 September 2015	None	Elevated	Side
28	Badkal Mor	बड़कल मोड़	III	6 September 2015	None	Elevated	Side
29	Old Faridabad	ओल्ड फ़रीदाबाद	III	6 September 2015	Faridabad	Elevated	Side
30	Neelam Chowk Ajronda	नीलम चौक अजरौन्दा	III	6 September 2015	None	Elevated	Side
31	Bata Chowk	बाटा चौक	III	6 September 2015	None	Elevated	Side
32	Escorts Mujesar	एस्कॉर्ट्स मुजेसर	III	6 September 2015	None	Elevated	Side
33	Sant Surdas - Sihi	संत सूरदास - सिहि	III	19 November 2018	None	Elevated	Side
34	Raja Nahar Singh	राजा नाहर सिंह	III	19 November 2018	Ballabhgarh	Elevated	Side

== Train info ==
Violet Line
Rakes	Hyundai Rotem BEML Rs-3
Train Length	6
Train Gauge	1,435 mm (4 ft 8 1/2 in) standard gauge
Electrification	25 kV 50 Hz AC (nominal) from overhead catenary
Train's Maximum Speed	100 km/h
Train Operation	Kashmere Gate - Badarpur Border Kashmere Gate - Old Faridabad Kashmere Gate - Raja Nahar Singh

== Infrastructure ==
The Violet Line is equipped with Bombardier CITYFLO 350 signalling.

=== Rolling stock ===
The Violet Line uses standard-gauge trains that were manufactured by a consortium of Mitsubishi–Hyundai Rotem–BEML. A total of 196 cars for the Violet Line and the Green Line were ordered in both four-car configurations (46 trains) and six-car configurations (two trains). One train was manufactured in Changwon, South Korea, while the remaining trains were manufactured at BEML's facility in Bangalore. The width of these trains is 2.9 meters as compared to 3.2 meters on broad gauge trains.

== Future extensions ==
Under Delhi Metro's Phase 5, there is no extension planned for the Violet Line. However, it will have an interchange with the upcoming Central Secretariat-Kishangarh corridor at Central Secretariat and the upcoming Jor Bagh-Mithapur corridor at Lajpat Nagar and Jasola Apollo.

== See also ==
- List of Delhi Metro stations
- Transport in Delhi
