= Faridabad =

City in Haryana, India

- Metropolitan City
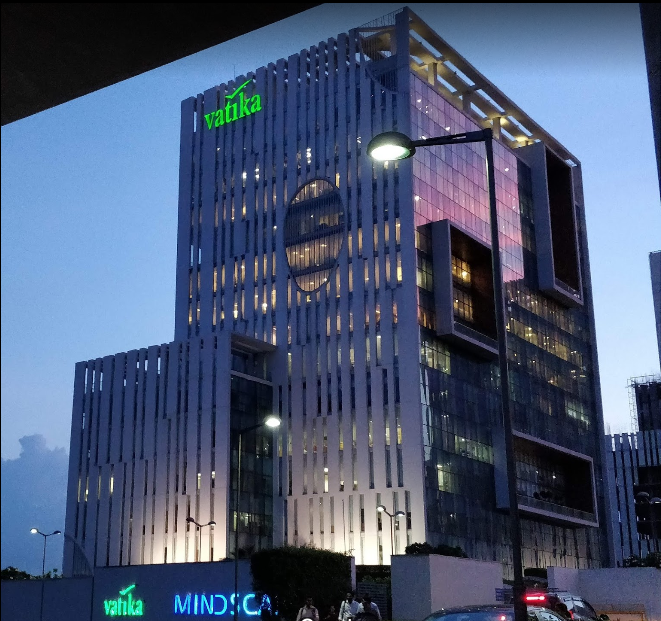
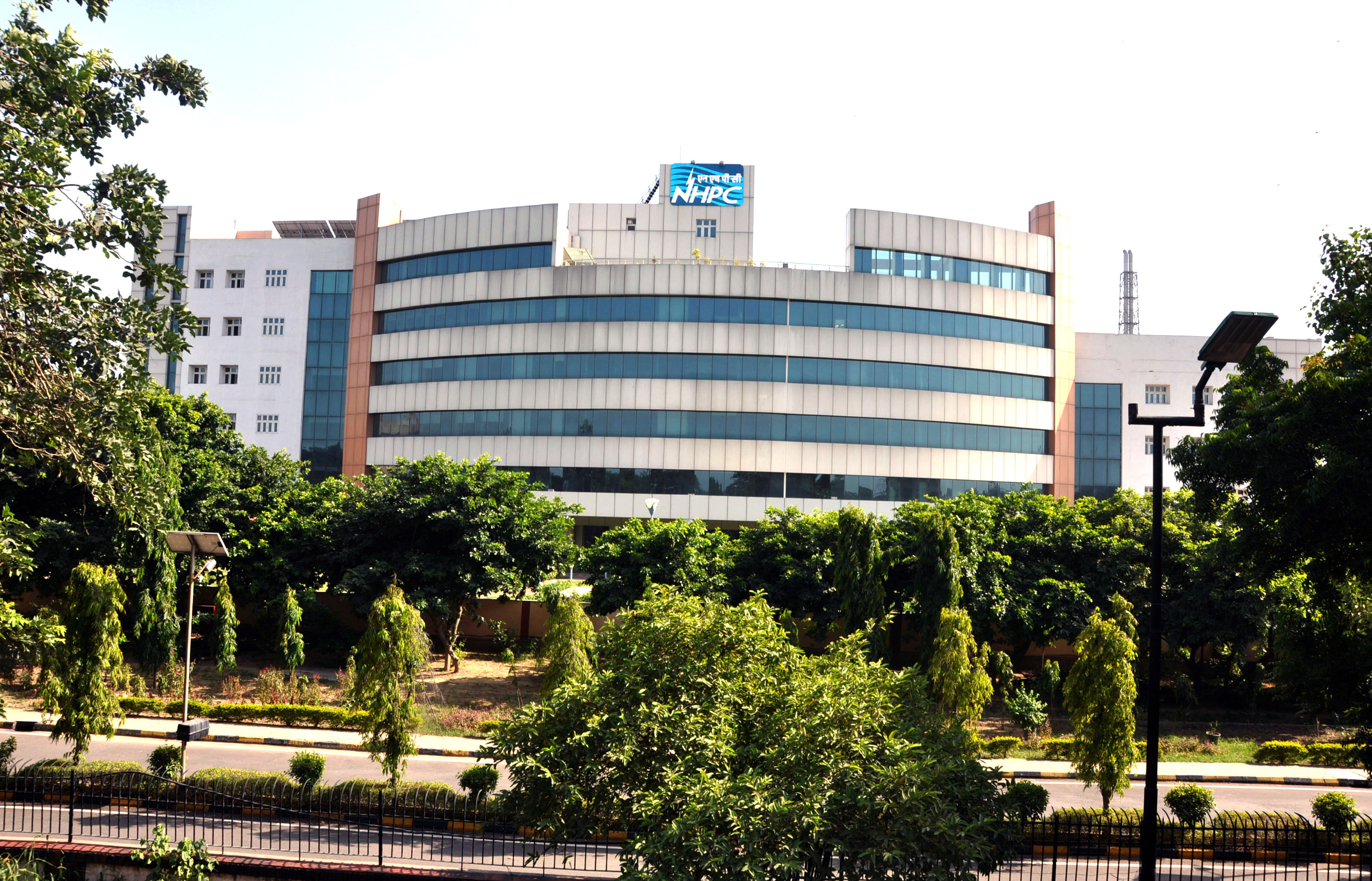
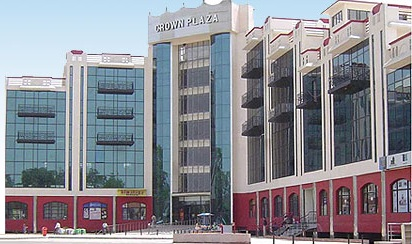
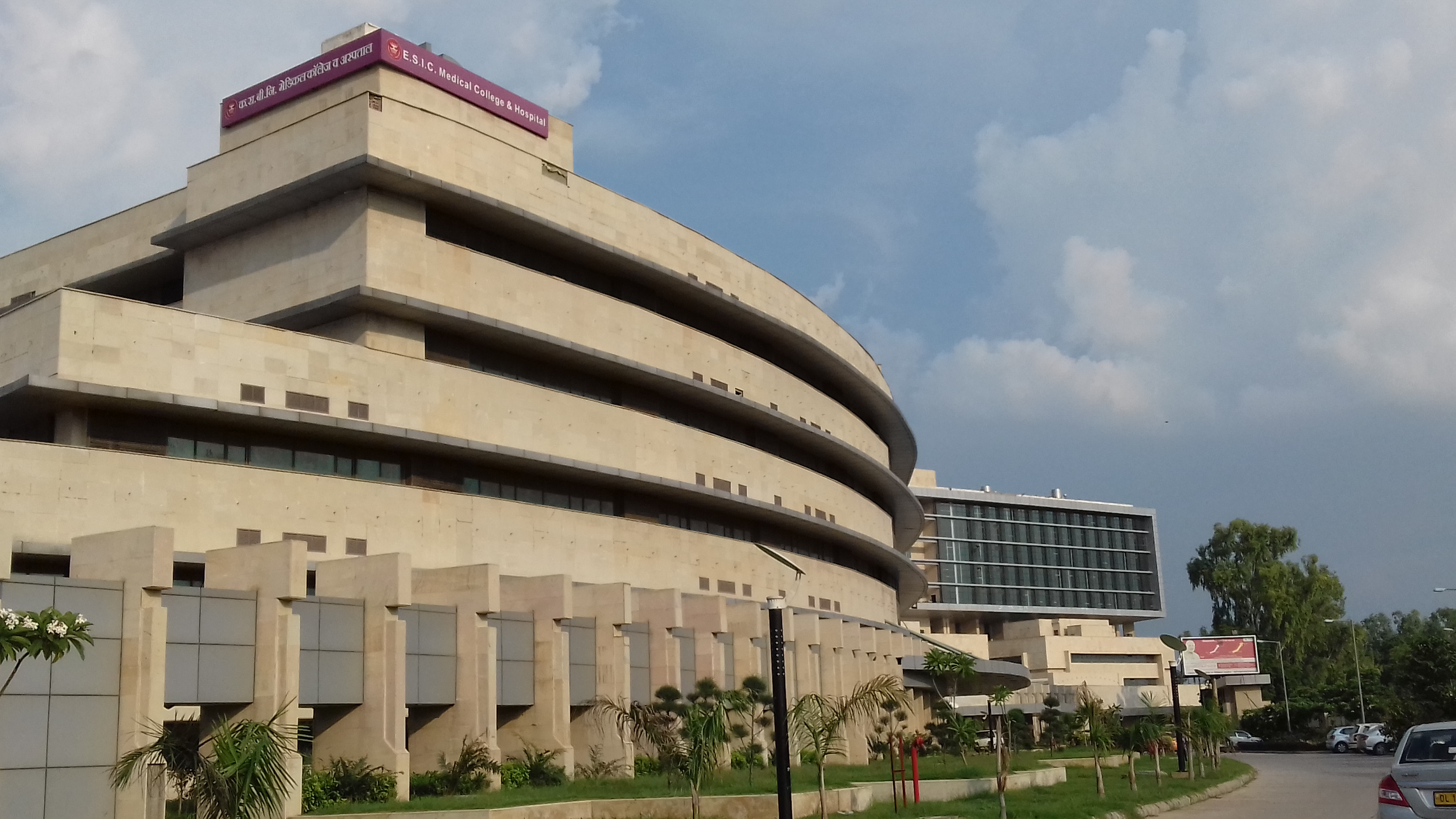
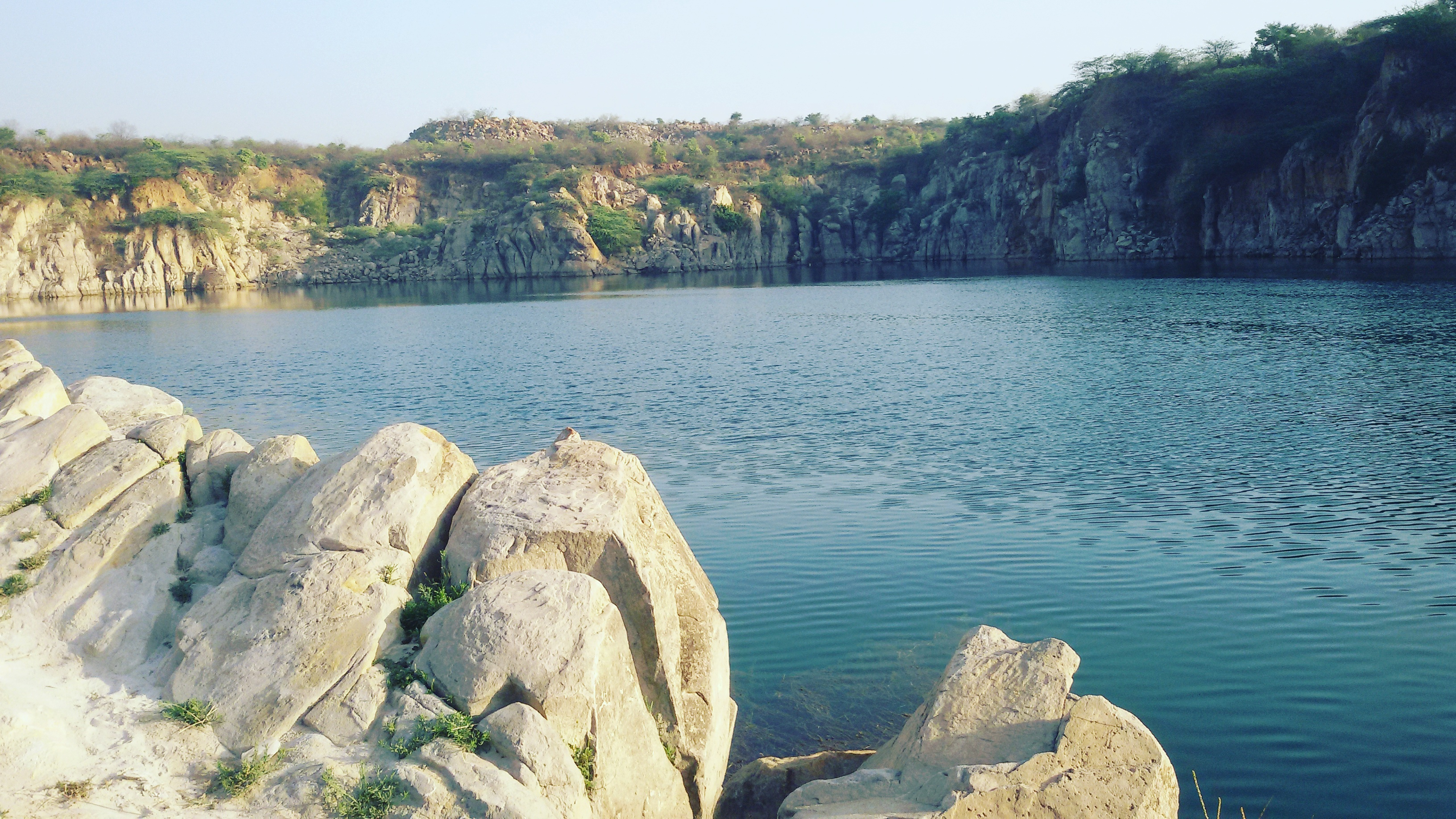
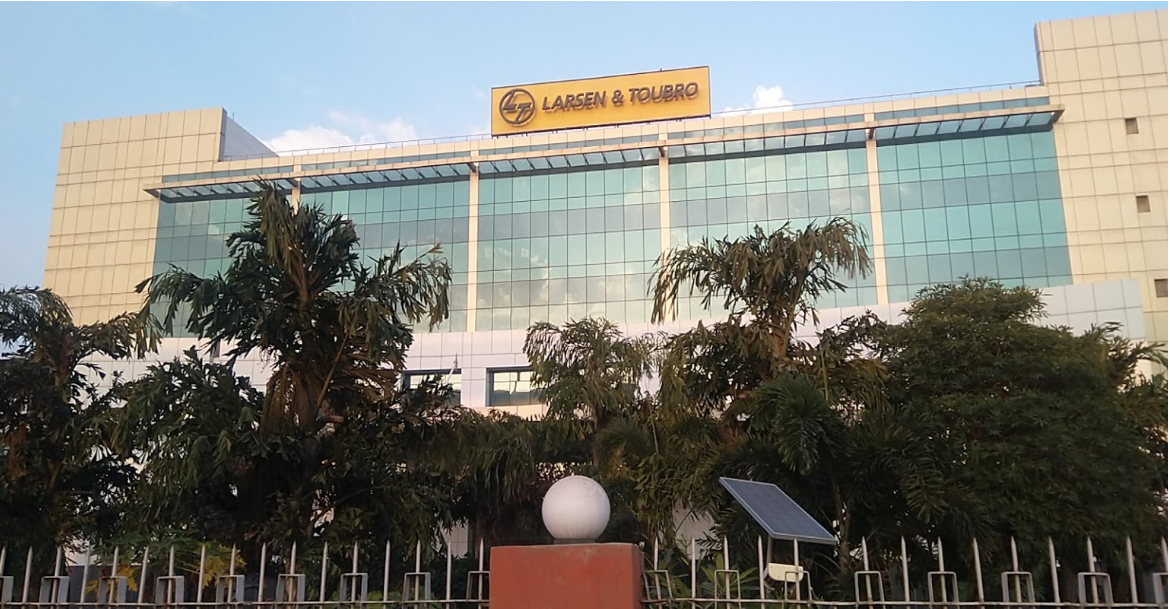
- From top, left to right: Vatika Mindscapes, NHPC Corporate Office, Crown Plaza of Faridabad, Lake near Surajkund, Larsen & Toubro Corporate Office

- Location within Haryana Location within India
- Coordinates: 28.4211°N 77.3078°E
- Country: India
- State: Haryana
- District: Faridabad
- Metropolitan Area: National Capital Region
- Established: 1607
- Founder: Shaikh Farid Bukhari

Government
  - Type: Municipal corporation
  - Body: Faridabad Municipal Corporation
  - Mayor: Praveen Joshi (BJP)
  - Lok Sabha MP: Krishan Pal Gurjar (BJP)
  - MLA: Vipul Goel (BJP)
  - Municipal Commissioner: A. Mona Sreenivas (IAS)

Area
  - Total: 204.00 km^{2} (78.76 sq mi)
- Elevation: 198 m (650 ft)

Population (2011)
  - Total: 1,414,050
  - Density: 6,931.6/km^{2} (17,953/sq mi)
- Demonym: Faridabadi/Fbd-ians

Languages
  - Official: Hindi
  - Additional official: English and Punjabi
  - Regional: Haryanvi
- Time zone: UTC+5:30 (IST)
- PIN: 121001
- Telephone code: 0129
- Vehicle registration: HR-51 (Faridabad city); HR-29 (Ballabhgarh); HR-38 (Commercial); HR-87 (Badkhal)
- HDI (2017): ▲0.696 ( medium)
- Website: ulbharyana.gov.in/faridabad

Faridabad (Hindi: [fəˈɾiːˌd̪aːbaːd̪]) is the most populous city in the Indian state of Haryana and is a part of Delhi National Capital Region. It is one of the major satellite cities around Delhi and is located 284 kilometres south of the state capital, Chandigarh. The river Yamuna forms the eastern district boundary with Uttar Pradesh. The Government of India included it in the second list of Smart Cities Mission on 24 May 2016. As per the 2021 Delhi Regional Plan, Faridabad is a part of the Central National Capital Region or Delhi metropolitan area.

The newly developed residential and industrial part of Faridabad (Sec. 66 to 89) between the Agra Canal and the Yamuna River is commonly referred to as Greater Faridabad (also known as Neharpar). The area is being developed as a self-sustained sub-city with wide roads, tall buildings, malls, educational institutions, and health and commercial centers. Sectors 66 to 74 are Industrial Sectors, while Sectors 75 to 89 are Residential Sectors.

Faridabad is a major industrial hub of Haryana. 50% of the income tax collected in Haryana is from Faridabad and Gurgaon. Faridabad is famous for henna production from the agricultural sector, while tractors, motorcycles, switch gears, refrigerators, shoes, tyres and garments constitute its primary industrial products.

In 2018, Faridabad was considered by the World Health Organization as the world's second most polluted city. Faridabad ranked 10th in the Swachh Survekshan Survey's top ten dirtiest cities in India in 2020.

Faridabad has been selected as one of the hundred Indian cities to be developed as a smart city under Government of India's flagship Smart Cities Mission by Ministry of Urban Development.

== History ==
The city was founded in 1607 by Sheikh Farīd, treasurer to the Mughal emperor Jahangir, to protect the Grand Trunk Road between Delhi and Agra, and lies in the cultural region of Braj and Mewat. In Independent India, Faridabad was initially a part of Gurgaon district which was later made an independent district on 15 August 1979. After partition in 1947, under the leadership of Kamaladevi Chattopadhyay, over 50000 refugees were resettled in Faridabad, reviving the economy and social life of the city.

Nearby Tilpat (then "Tilprastha") was one of the five villages demanded by Pandavas to avert a disastrous war.

== Geography ==
=== Climate ===
Faridabad

Climate chart (precipitation, max. and min. temperature)
J	F	M	A	M	J	J	A	S	O	N	D
15 21 8	19 23 10	21 30 15	27 36 21	29 40 26	61 39 28	214 35 27	228 34 26	100 34 25	21 33 19	5 28 13	14 22 8
- █ Average max. and min. temperatures in °C
- █ Precipitation totals in mm
- Source: Weather 2
Imperial conversion
J	F	M	A	M	J	J	A	S	O	N	D
0.6 70 46	0.7 73 50	0.8 86 59	1.1 97 70	1.1 104 79	2.4 102 82	8.4 95 81	9 93 79	3.9 93 77	0.8 91 66	0.2 82 55	0.6 72 46
- █ Average max. and min. temperatures in °F
- █ Precipitation totals in inches

Faridabad has a borderline hot semi-arid climate BSh just short of a dry winter humid subtropical climate (Cwa). The city features the three typical Indian seasons – The "hot" or pre-monsoon season lasts from late March to mid-July and is typified by sweltering and arid conditions that begin very dry but later turn humid. The "wet" or monsoon season is sweltering and often dangerously humid with frequent but erratic heavy rainfall. Following the retreat of the monsoon is the "cool" or winter season with warm and sunny weather producing by far the most comfortable conditions.

According to the World Air Quality Report 2024, Faridabad is one of the world's 20 most polluted city in India.

Climate data for Faridabad
Month	Jan	Feb	Mar	Apr	May	Jun	Jul	Aug	Sep	Oct	Nov	Dec	Year
Mean daily maximum °C (°F)	21.1 (70.0)	23.7 (74.7)	30.0 (86.0)	36.9 (98.4)	40.0 (104.0)	39.0 (102.2)	35.2 (95.4)	34.2 (93.6)	34.2 (93.6)	32.9 (91.2)	27.6 (81.7)	22.4 (72.3)	31.4 (88.6)
Mean daily minimum °C (°F)	7.7 (45.9)	10.6 (51.1)	15.3 (59.5)	21.1 (70.0)	25.4 (77.7)	27.7 (81.9)	26.7 (80.1)	25.8 (78.4)	23.9 (75.0)	19.1 (66.4)	14.2 (57.6)	9.3 (48.7)	18.9 (66.0)
Average rainfall mm (inches)	23 (0.9)	33 (1.3)	20 (0.8)	14 (0.6)	20 (0.8)	74 (2.9)	208 (8.2)	183 (7.2)	99 (3.9)	13 (0.5)	5 (0.2)	8 (0.3)	700 (27.6)
Source: Climate Data

Faridabad has been ranked 17th best “National Clean Air City” (under Category 1 >10L Population cities) in India.

== Demographics ==
Historical population
Year	Pop.	±%
1901	9,816	—
1911	8,540	−13.0%
1921	8,058	−5.6%
1931	9,296	+15.4%
1941	11,475	+23.4%
1951	37,393	+225.9%
1961	59,039	+57.9%
1971	122,817	+108.0%
1981	330,864	+169.4%
1991	617,717	+86.7%
2001	1,055,938	+70.9%
2011	1,414,050	+33.9%
2021	1,838,000	+30.0%
2022	1,893,000	+3.0%
2023	1,949,000	+3.0%
2024	2,007,000	+3.0%
2025	2,067,000	+3.0%
2026	2,129,000	+3.0%
Source: Census of India

Religion in Faridabad (2011)
Religion	Percent
Hinduism	89.01%
Islam	7.29%
Sikhism	2.04%
Christianity	0.64%
Other or not stated	1.02%

Religion in Faridabad City
Religion	Population (1911)	Percentage (1911)
Hinduism	3,034	67.65%
Islam	1,436	32.02%
Christianity	12	0.27%
Sikhism	1	0.02%
Others (Note: Including Jainism, Buddhism, Zoroastrianism, Judaism, others, or not stated)	2	0.04%
Total Population	4,485	100%

As of the 2011 census official report, Faridabad Municipal Corporation had 290,675 households and a population of 1,414,050. 187,639 (13.27%) were under the age of 7. Faridabad had a sex ratio of 874 females per 1000 males and a literacy rate of 83.83% for those 7 years and above. Scheduled Castes made up 133,395 (10.57%) of the population respectively.

Faridabad had a slum population of 215,053, which is 15.21% of the population. Slum households were 45,900.

In Faridabad district houseless people were 3,523 in 834 famlies, making up 0.19466960043277% of the population.

Languages of Faridabad (2011)
1. Hindi (87.6%)
2. Punjabi (4.41%)
3. Bhojpuri (1.81%)
4. Haryanvi (1.40%)
5. Others (4.79%)

At the time of the 2011 Census of India, 87.59% of the population spoke Hindi, 4.41% Punjabi, 1.81% Bhojpuri and 1.40% Haryanvi as their first language.

The local languages are Brajbhasha and Haryanvi.

== Administration ==
There are six key administrators of Faridabad.

S. No.	Department	Title	Position Holder	Qualification
1	Administration	Divisional Commissioner	Sanjay Joon	IAS
2	Administration	Deputy Commissioner	Ayush Sinha	IAS
3	Administration	Additional Deputy Commissioner	Aparajita	IAS
4	Municipal Corporation of Faridabad (MCF)	Commissioner	Jitendra	IAS
5	Judiciary	District & Sessions Judge	Yashvir Singh Rathore	HCS (Judicial)
6	Police	Commissioner of Police	Vikas Kumar Arora	IPS

Faridabad, Palwal, and Nuh district jointly fall under Faridabad division of Haryana. A Division is headed by a Divisional Commissioner.

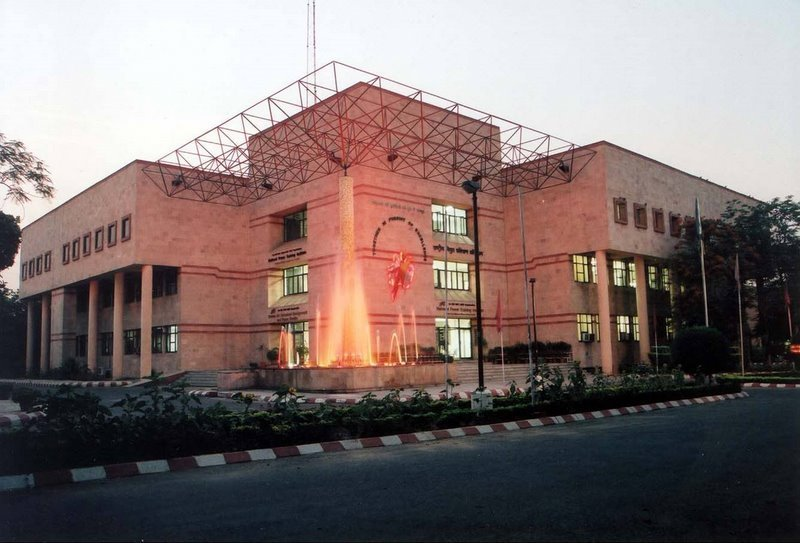
National Power Training Institute Corporate Office, Faridabad

Faridabad has a judiciary system headquartered at District Court in Sector 12 which came into existence on 8 December 1980 with Shri A.P. Chaudhary as first District & Sessions Judge, Faridabad. The District Court has its Bar association with more than 2000 lawyers as its members

=== Municipal finance ===
According to financial data published on the CityFinance Portal of the Ministry of Housing and Urban Affairs, the Municipal Corporation Faridabad reported total revenue receipts of ₹390 crore (US$47 million) and total expenditure of ₹413 crore (US$50 million) in 2022–23. Tax revenue accounted for about 18.5% of the total revenue, while grant receipts were not reported in the available financial indicators.

== Economy ==
The Faridabad Small Industries Association claims that Faridabad and Gurgaon districts account for almost 56% of the income tax collected in Haryana. Faridabad has been selected as one of the hundred Indian cities to be developed as a smart city under PM Narendra Modi's flagship Smart Cities Mission. It has started growing as another technology hub in Haryana nurturing startups and innovation.

Faridabad is the largest exporter of henna (Mehandi) in India. According to the Faridabad Henna Manufacturing Association, the sale of henna from Faridabad is worth an estimated ₹250 crore (US$26 million)–₹300 crore (US$31 million) annually.

Many directorates of different union government ministries are headquartered in Faridabad including Central Ground Water Board, Department of Plant Quarantine and Central Insecticide Lab, and Union Government Offices from Haryana including the Commissioner of Central Excise within Department of Revenue, Government of India, Department of Explosives, and Department of Labour. Institute such as National Council for Cement and Building Materials, a research and development institute under the ministry of commerce, and industry has its head office in Faridabad.

The Apex Central Training Institute of the Department of Revenue, Government of India, National Academy of Customs Excise & Narcotics is located at Sector 29. The National Power Training Institute, an autonomous body under Ministry of Power, Government of India has a corporate office in Faridabad. The city also hosts the National Institute of Financial Management, which serves as training academy for accounting and financial services.

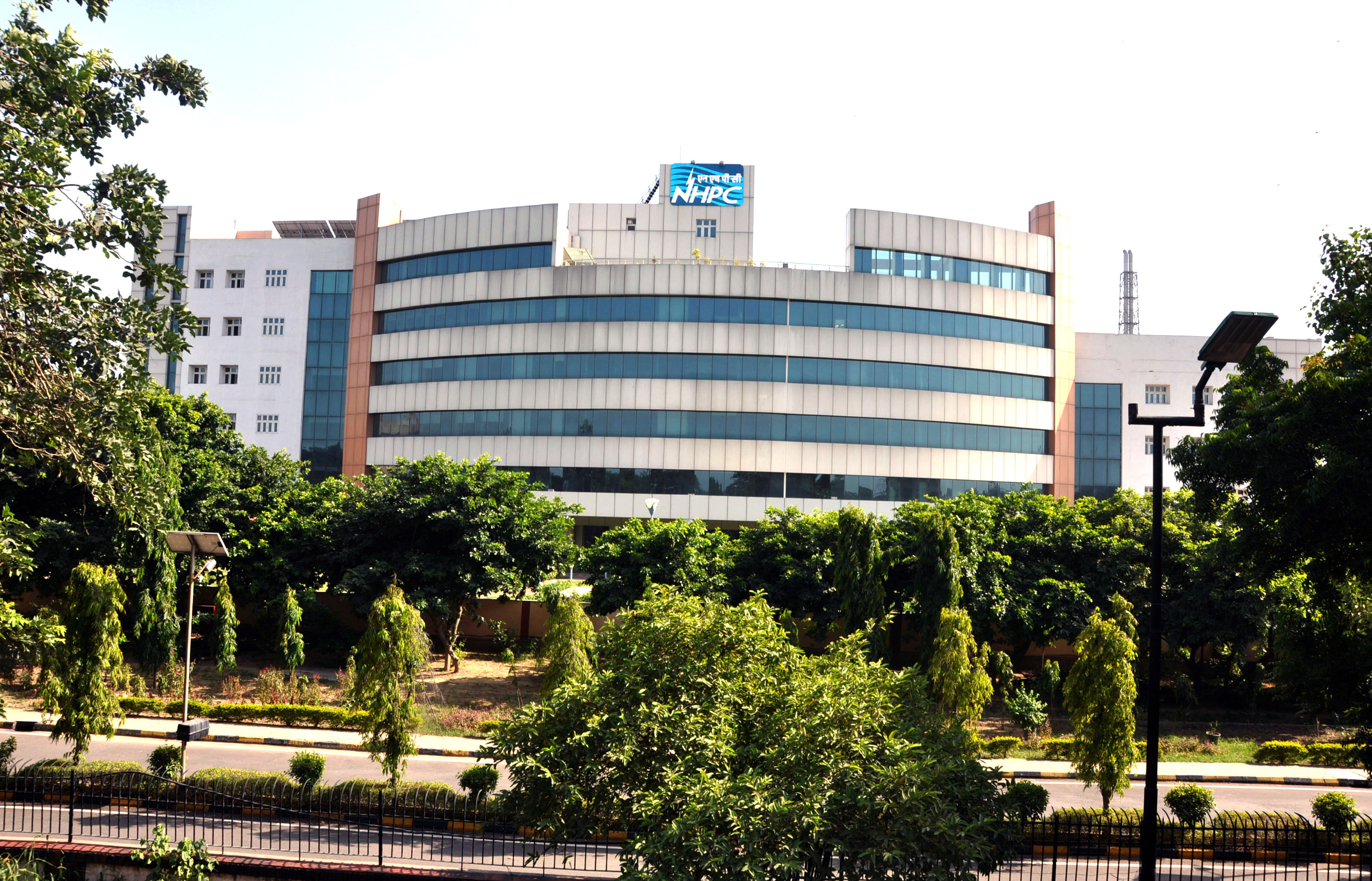
NHPC Corporate Office, Faridabad

Also headquartered here is NHPC Limited which is a Central PSU under the Ministry of Power, Government of India, and the largest hydropower Company in India.

An office of Geological Survey of India is also located in the NIT-5 area of the city.

Faridabad is the industrial capital of Haryana. As of 2013, out of a total of 11,665 registered working factories in Haryana, 2,499 were in Faridabad which was followed by Gurgaon with 2,116 factories. According to a study, the growth of Faridabad has been declining in the last 2 decades, the share of Faridabad in investment is less than 1% and 93% of investment is in the paper industry. The industrial contribution of Faridabad to Haryana's revenue was declined from 29% to 22% in 2012–13.

Faridabad is home to large-scale companies like Escorts Limited, India Yamaha Motor Pvt. Ltd., Havells India Limited, JCB, Indian Oil (R&D), Larsen & Toubro (L&T), Whirlpool, ABB, Goodyear. Bata and Eicher Tractor, and Beebay Kidswear Eyewear e-tailer Lenskart and healthcare startup Lybrate have their headquarters in Faridabad. More than 5,000 units of auto parts producers are based in Faridabad. Lakhani Armaan Group has set up manufacturing facilities at Faridabad (Haryana). Faridabad has experienced growth in real estate activity, with contributions from a range of developers and property agencies.

== Transportation and connectivity ==
=== Rail ===
Faridabad is on the broad gauge of the New Delhi – Mumbai Line. New Delhi and Hazrat Nizammudin Railway Station is about 25 km away from Old Faridabad railway station. The trains for big cities like Mumbai, Hyderabad, Chennai are easily accessible from here. Local trains runs between New Delhi to Faridabad.

=== Metro ===
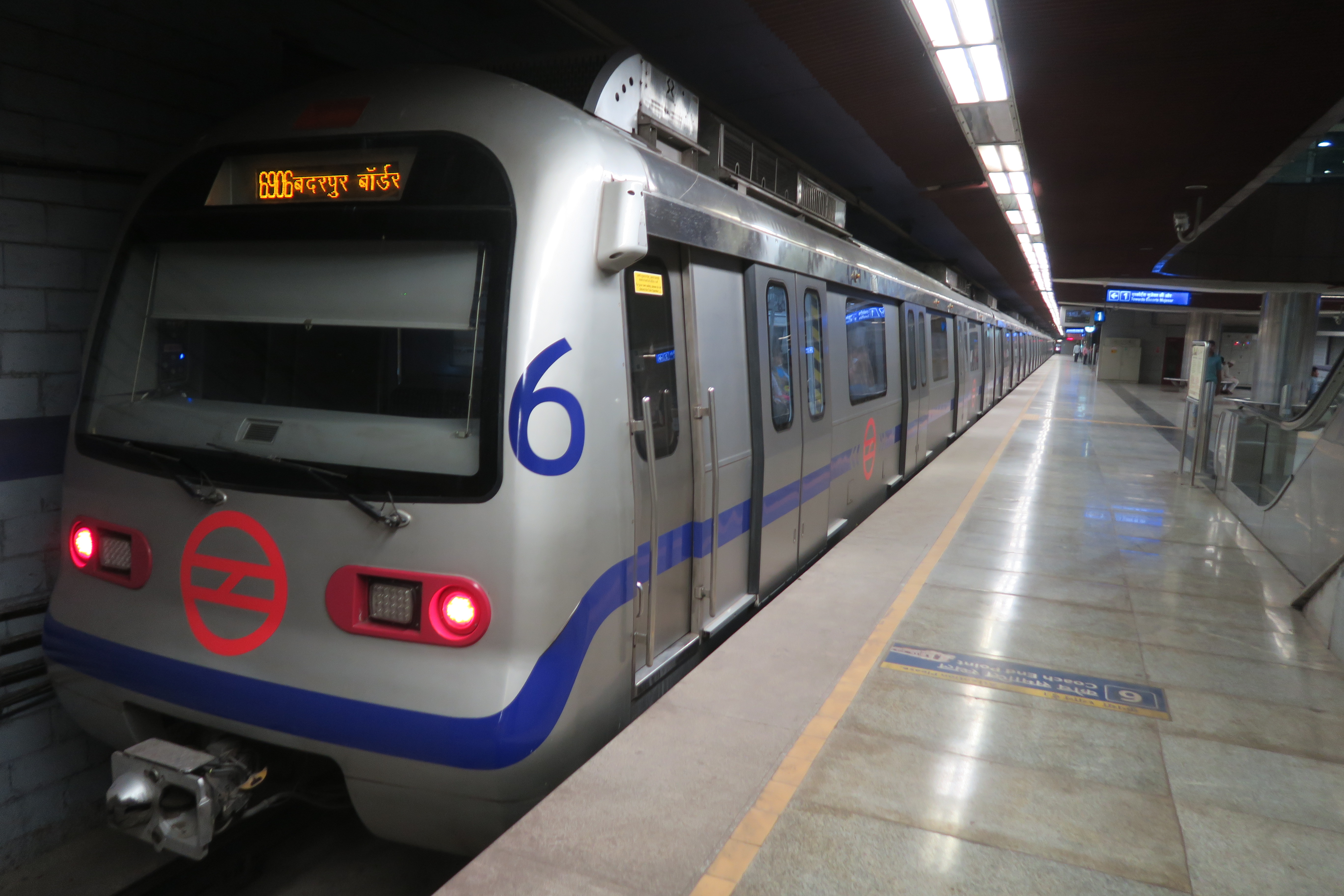
The Violet Line of the Delhi Metro connects Faridabad

Delhi Metro Violet Line connects Faridabad with Delhi. The extension of Violet Line to Faridabad was inaugurated by Prime Minister Narendra Modi on 6 September 2015. There are 9 metro stations in Faridabad corridor of Delhi Metro which are all elevated. Metro has been recently elongated to Ballabhgarh with the addition of two stations- Sant Surdas Sihi and Raja Nahar Singh Ballabhgarh.

The 11 metro stations are Sarai, NHPC Chowk, Mewala Maharajpur, Sector 28, Badkhal Mor, Old Faridabad, Neelam Chowk Ajronda, Bata Chowk, Escorts Mujesar, Sant Surdas (Sihi) and Raja Nahar Singh.

The Delhi Metro's Violet Line is set to extend from Raja Nahar Singh (Ballabhgarh) to Palwal, covering 24 km with about 10 stations. The Haryana government approved the project, and a techno-feasibility study is underway. Estimated at ₹4,320 crore, it aims to improve NCR connectivity.

=== Road ===
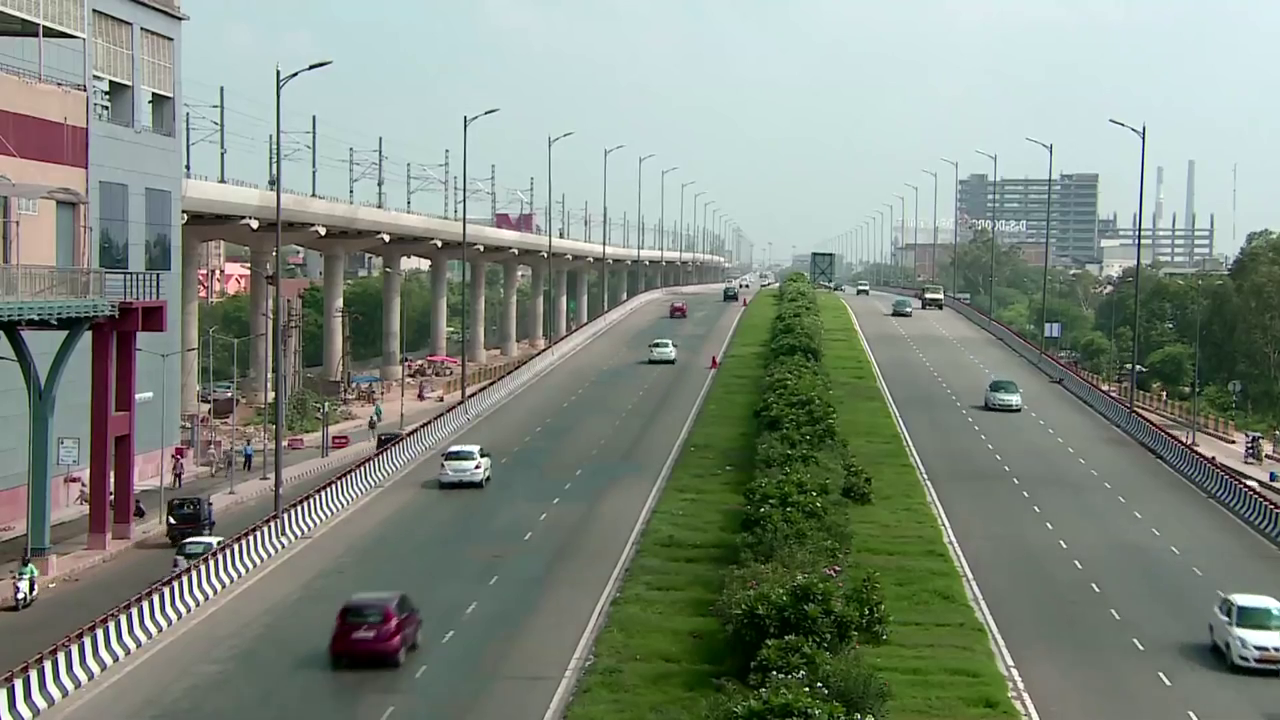
Delhi Faridabad Skyway

Faridabad is well connected with Delhi through Delhi Faridabad Skyway (Main Badarpur Flyover). Upcoming DND-Faridabad-KMP expressway

It is also connected to cities of Gurgaon through Faridabad Gurugram Road (SH137) and Noida, Gautam Buddha Nagar of Uttar Pradesh through Upcoming Bridge near Manjhawali in Faridabad and Jewar in Noida and Ghaziabad through F.N.G road. It is also connected to Delhi-Mumbai Expressway.

=== Airways ===
Faridabad is served by Indira Gandhi International Airport in New Delhi, which is around 35 km from Faridabad. The airport is the busiest airport in India and provides domestic and international air connectivity.

== Education ==
=== Higher education ===
There are numerous educational institutions in Faridabad that offer higher education courses. These colleges provide courses in different field like science, medicine, arts, commerce, engineering, MCA, etc. Some of the colleges that offer graduate and undergraduate courses include:

- Al-Falah University (AFU)
- ESIC Medical College
- Institute of Hotel Management, Faridabad
- J.C. Bose University of Science and Technology, YMCA
- Manav Rachna International University
- National Power Training Institute
- Regional Centre for Biotechnology (RCB)
- Translational Health Science and Technology Institute (THSTI)

== Healthcare ==
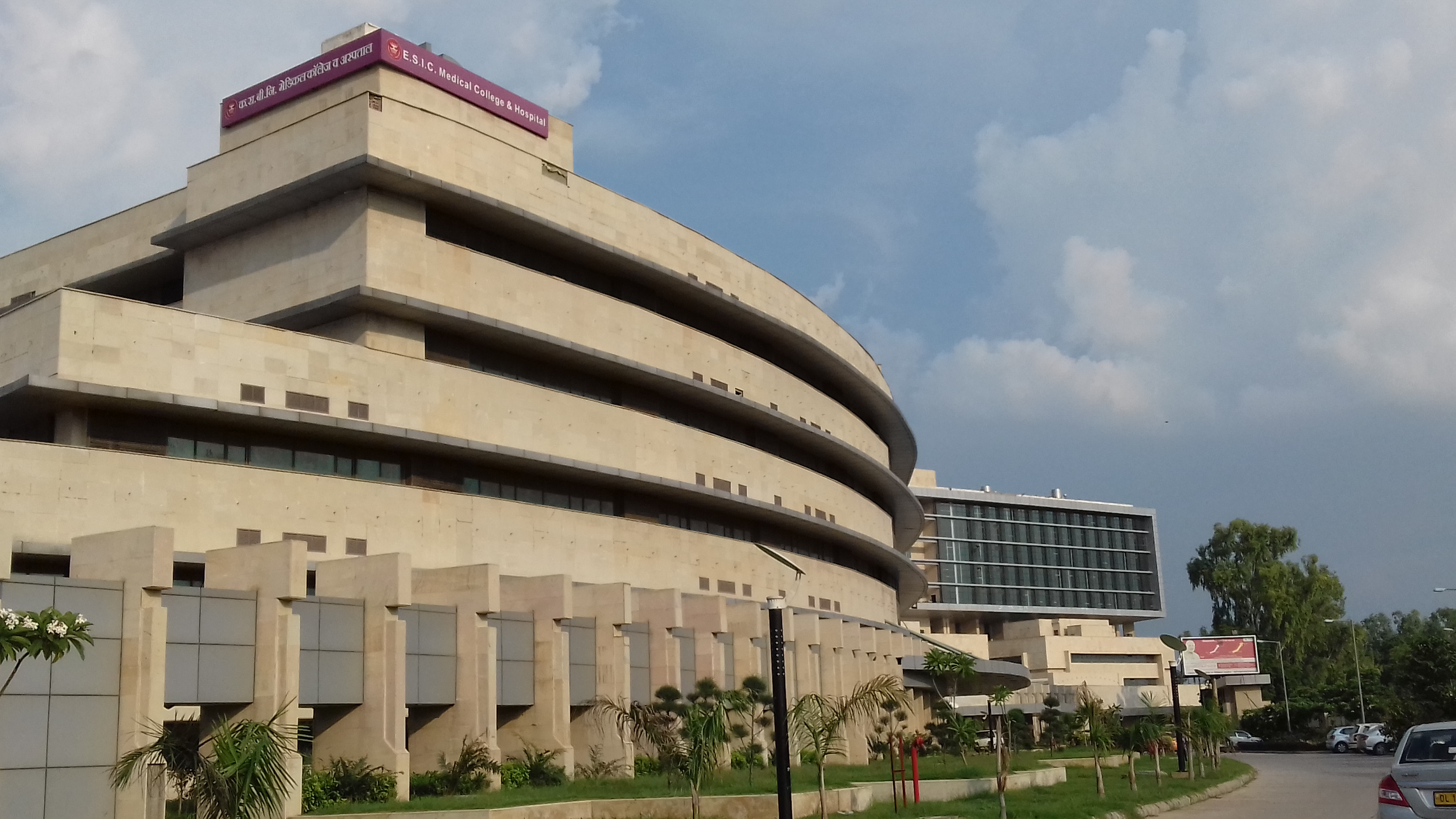
ESIC Medical College, Faridabad

There are many private and government hospitals in Faridabad. The city also has one Government Medical College Hospital named Employees State Insurance Corporation Medical College, Faridabad. The city had another private medical college Gold field medical college situated in Village Chainsa, Ballabgarh which got defunct in 2016 due to financial constraints and later bought by Haryana government and planned to restart in 2020 by the name of "Atal Bihari Vajpayee government medical College". Other hospitals include:

- Amrita Hospital
- Asian Institute of Medical Sciences
- ESIC Medical College
- Metro Heart Institute Hospital

Amrita Vishwa Vidyapeetham healthcare campus, Faridabad

== Sports ==
=== Cricket ===
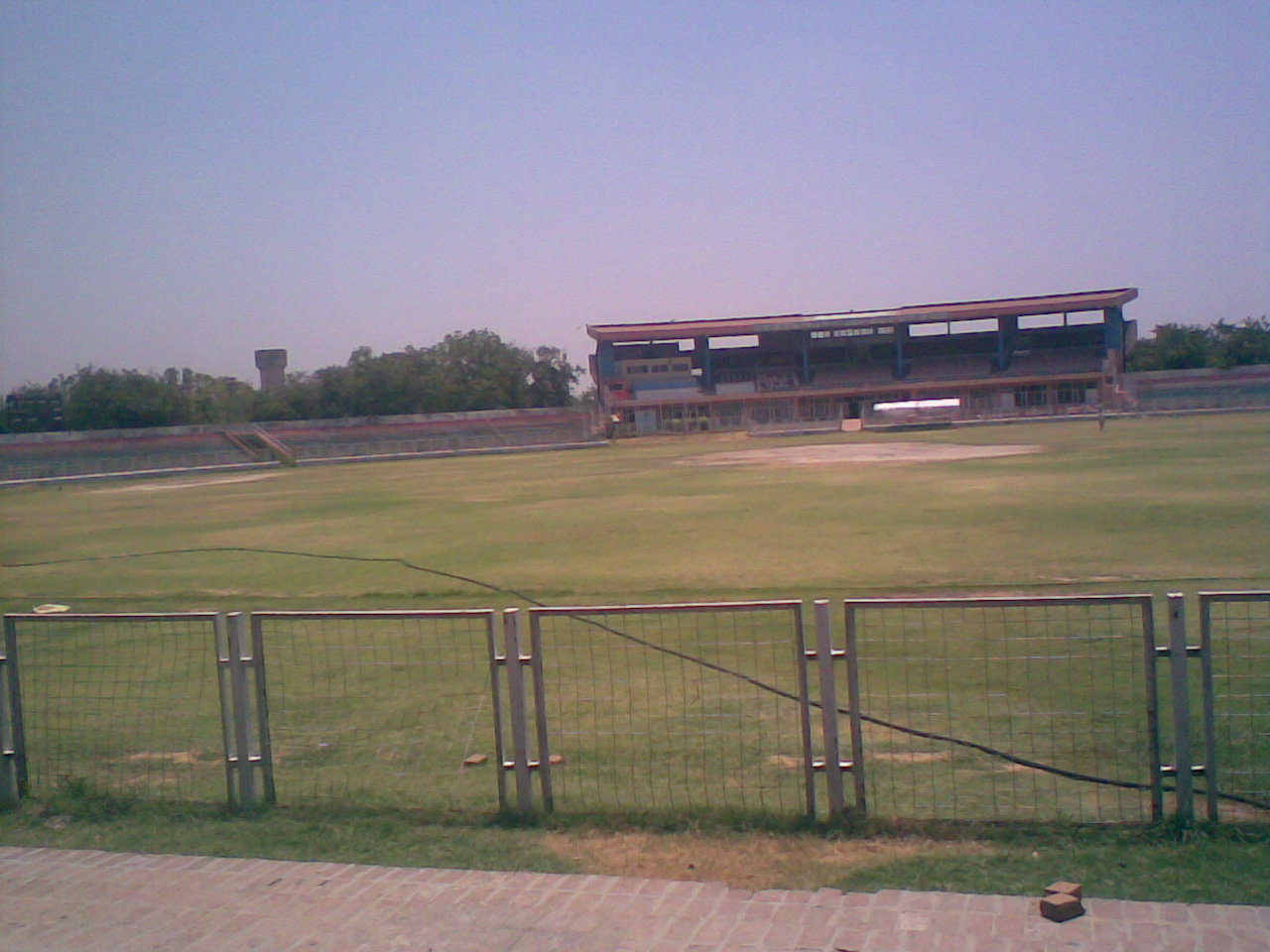
Nahar Singh Stadium

The Nahar Singh Stadium, which has approximately 25,000 seats, has hosted 8 international cricket matches and a league cricket match between Mumbai Heroes and Bhojpuri Dabbang of Celebrity Cricket League. However, owing to the poor condition of the grounds, international competitions have not been held there since 2017. In 2019, a $10.15 million (115 Crore) Haryana government project began to renovate the stadium and grounds. International matches are expected to resume in the facility by the early 2020.

== Groundwater and land subsidence ==
A study published in Nature scientific report reports that land is sinking in Faridabad due to groundwater overpumping.

== Tourism ==
=== Badkhal Lake ===
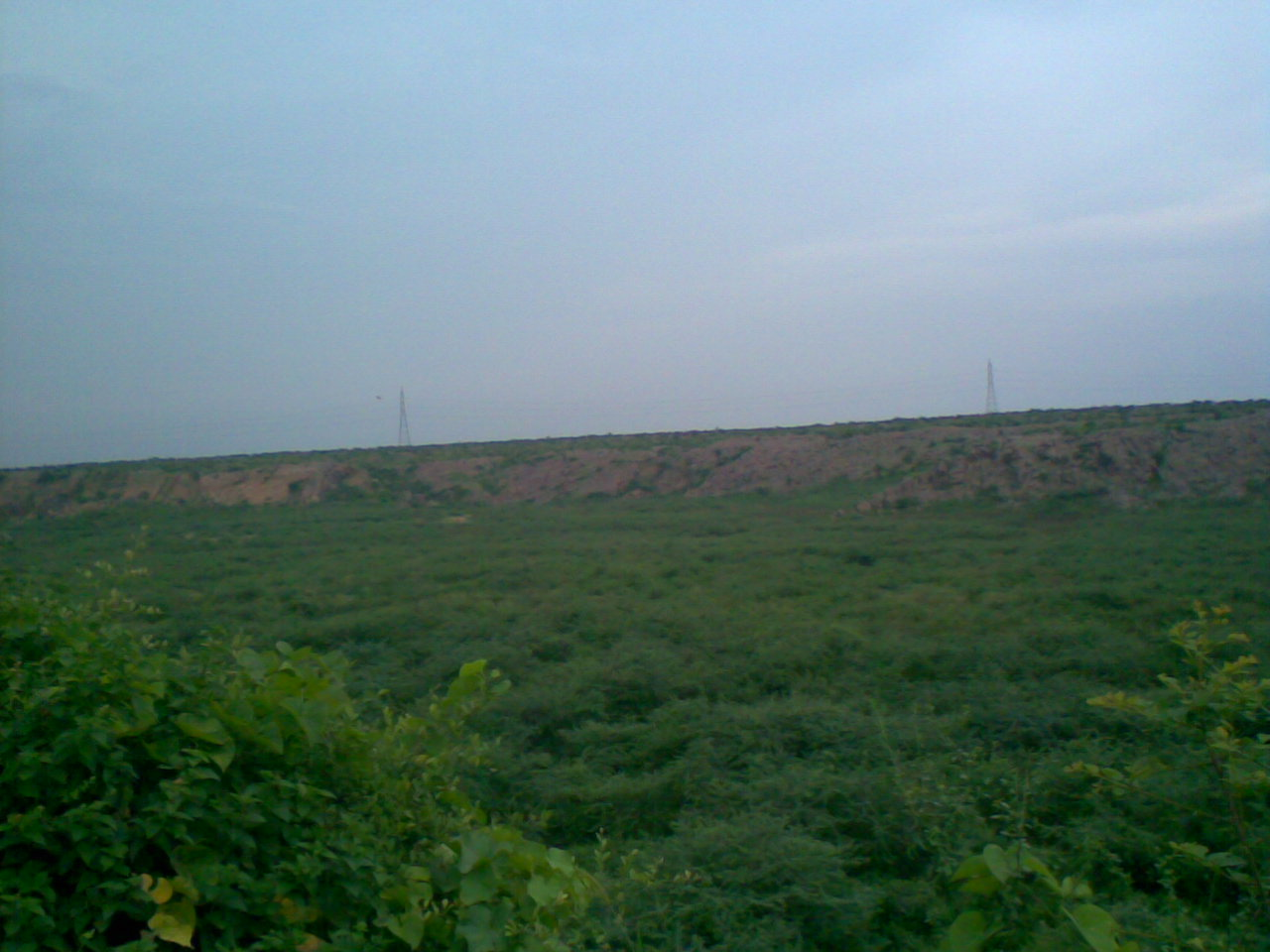
Dried Badkhal lake

Badkhal Lake was located in Badkhal village, 8 km from Delhi Border. The lake fringed by Aravalli hills was a man-made embankment which has now dried up. The lake complex, spread over 40 acres, had come up in 1969. In June 2015, Haryana government decided to revive the Badkhal lake here to once again attract tourists.

=== Surajkund Tourist Complex and International Crafts Fair ===
Situated at a distance of around 8 km from South Delhi. It is a 10th-century water reservoir which believed to be built by Tomar king Surajpal. Place is known for its annual fair "Surajkund International Crafts Mela". 2015 edition of fair was visited by 1.2 million visitors including 160,000 foreigners with more than 20 countries participating in fair. The Suraj Kund Lake. D2i.in. Retrieved on 2012-01-10. here is surrounded by rock cut steps.

2016 edition of Surajkund International Crafts Mela was the 30th edition and People's Republic of China will be participating in the fair. Participation of the China will be the part of agreement signed between India and China in 2014 to celebrate year 2016 as "Year of China in India".

In 2021, the international crafts fair or Surajkund Mela, as it commonly called scheduled from 1 to 15 February was cancelled for the first time in 34 years amid COVID-19 fears.

=== Anangpur Dam ===
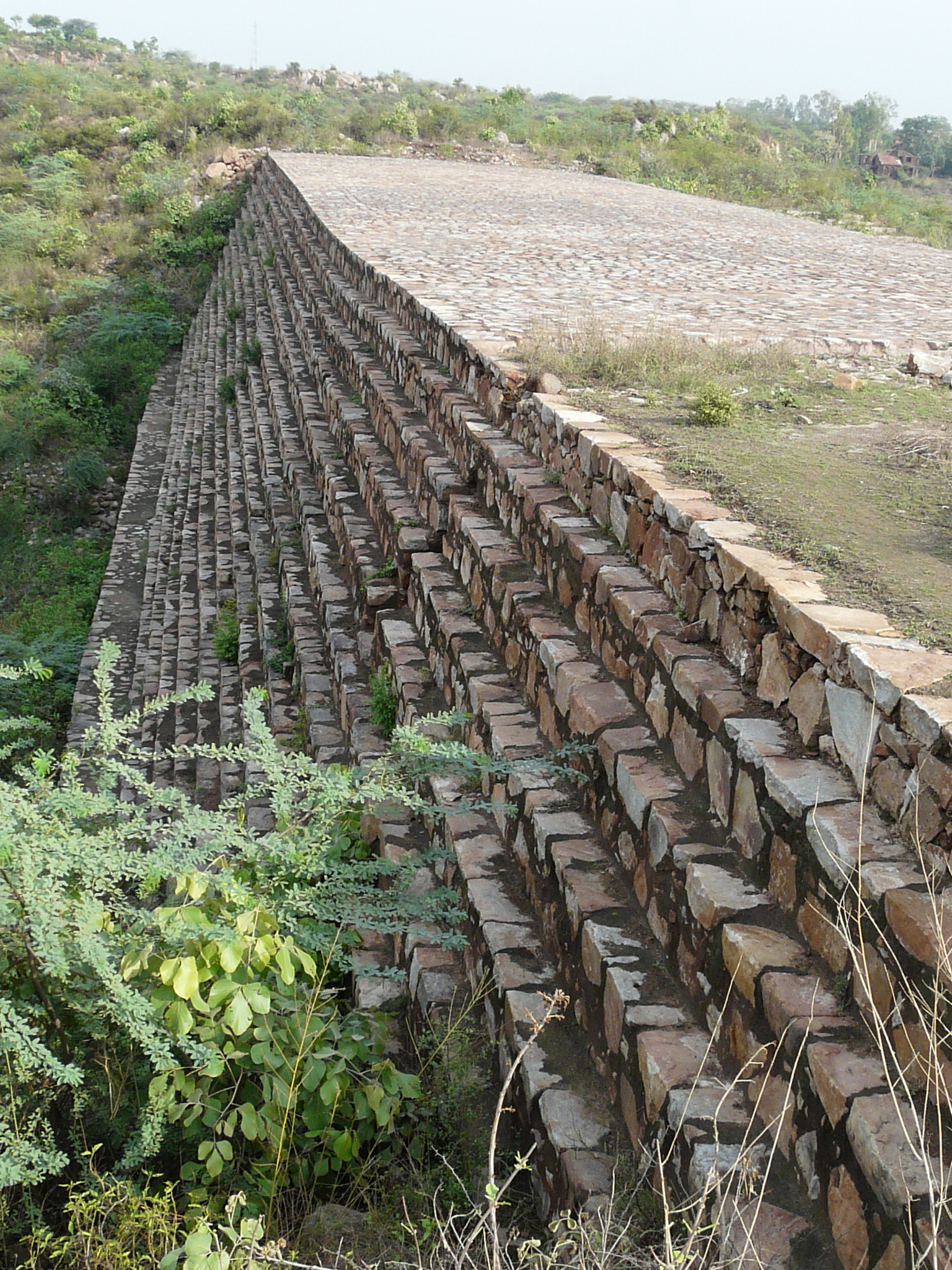
Surajkund dam downstream side

The Anagpur Dam is located close to the Anagpur village (also called Arangpur) in Faridabad district, about 2 kilometres (1.2 mi) away from Surajkund. This unique Indian hydraulic engineering structure was built during the reign of King Anangpal of the Tomar dynasty in the 8th century. It is approachable by road from Delhi from the Delhi – Mathura road. The ruins of the fortifications found in Anangpur village establish by an inference that it was built by Anangpal as part of the Lal Kot that was developed as the first city of Delhi in the 8th century.

=== Raja Nahar Singh Palace ===
Raja Nahar Singh palace is located in Ballabhgarh. Now Haryana Tourism manages the palace as heritage property. The palace is now a hotel-cum-restaurant.

=== Baba Farid's Tomb ===
The tomb is located in old Faridabad. Baba Farid was a popular Sufi Sant. The tomb contains 2 gigantic doors and the graves of Baba Farid and his son.

=== Prehistoric Stone Age site ===
Archaeologists discovered cave paintings and tools from the Paleolithic period in the Mangar Bani hill forest, which is on the outskirts of Faridabad. The cave paintings are estimated to be one lac years old. These are believed to be the largest in the Indian subcontinent and possibly the world's oldest.

=== Recreation ===
Faridabad and various shopping malls including SRS Mall in Sector 12, Crown Interiors Mall in Sarai Khawaja Village, Crown Plaza in Sector 15 A, Parasnath Mall along with several others. The city has a good network of parks in each sector with some of the major parks like Town Park in Sector 12 which also accommodates one of the Largest Flag of India. Omaxe World Street is the recent addition to the malls of Greater Faridabad.

== Religious sites ==
- Kristuraja Cathedral (Christ the King Cathedral) in Ballabhgarh, see of Kuriakose Bharanikulangara, the Metropolitan Archbishop of the Syro-Malabar Catholic Archeparchy of Faridabad
- ISKCON Faridabad Sri Sri Rādhā Govind Dhām.
- Shri Maharani Vaishno Devi Mandir, Tikona Park.
- Shri Salasar Balaji Evam Khatu Shyam Mandir, Main Mathura Road, Ballabhgarh
- Shri 1008 Parshvanath Digambar Jain Mandir, Sector 16
- Jharna Mandir, Mohabbtabad
- Nagashri Temple, Sihi
- Dhuni Baba Temple, Tilori Khadar
- Ratan Nath Mandir
- Shiv Mandir, Sainik Colony
- Shri Triveni Hanuman Mandir at Gurgaon-Faridabad Expressway
- Parson Temple near Badhkal Lake
- Jagannath Temple, Faridabad, Sector 15A
- Hari Parwat Mandir, Anangpur

== Utilities ==
Faridabad has been selected as one of the 100 Smart Cities in India. A live talk show on making Faridabad 'a smart city' was organised at Municipal Corporation's Auditorium. Haryana Power Generation Corporation Ltd (HPGCL) is setting up a solar power plant at the site of a defunct thermal power plant in Faridabad. The power generator plans to set up the plant over 151.78 acres near Bata Chowk in the district that generated coal based energy in the past.

== Environment ==
A petition was filed with National Green Tribunal (NGT) for protection of Aravalli from Faridabad waste disposal.

== Politics of Faridabad ==
The Lok Sabha MP representing Faridabad Lok Sabha constituency is Krishan Pal Gurjar, who was elected in May 2019. The MLA representing Faridabad Assembly constituency is Vipul Goel, who was elected in October 2024.

== Notable people ==
- Ram Chander Bainda – politician
- Avtar Singh Bhadana - politician
- Manu Bhaker - double Olympic medallist
- Manvinder Bisla - domestic cricketer
- Shweta Chaudhary - international shooter
- Rahul Dalal, b 1992 – domestic cricketer.
- Krishan Pal Gurjar - politician
- Himani Kapoor - Bollywood playback singer
- Ajey Nagar – YouTube content creator under the name CarryMinati
- Lalit Nagar – politician – former MLA from Tigaon constituency
- Manish Narwal - paralympic gold medallist and Khel Ratna winner
- Shiva Narwal - international shooter
- Sonu Nigam – Bollywood playback singer
- Dhruv Rathee – YouTuber
- Ajay Ratra – international cricketer
- Mahesh Rawat – domestic cricketer
- Rhythm Sangwan - Olympian
- Anisa Sayyed – international shooter
- Mohit Sharma – international cricketer
- Richa Sharma - Bollywood playback and devotional singer
- Kabir Duhan Singh – Bollywood actor
- Mahender Pratap Singh – Indian politician
- Gaurav Solanki – international boxer
- Rahul Tewatia – cricketer – Haryana – Gujarat Titans
- Vijay Yadav – international cricketer

== See also ==
- Gurgaon
- Noida
- Largest Indian cities by GDP
