= Raja Nahar Singh (Ballabhgarh) metro station =

Metro station in Delhi, India

Raja Nahar Singh‌‌ (Ballabhgarh)

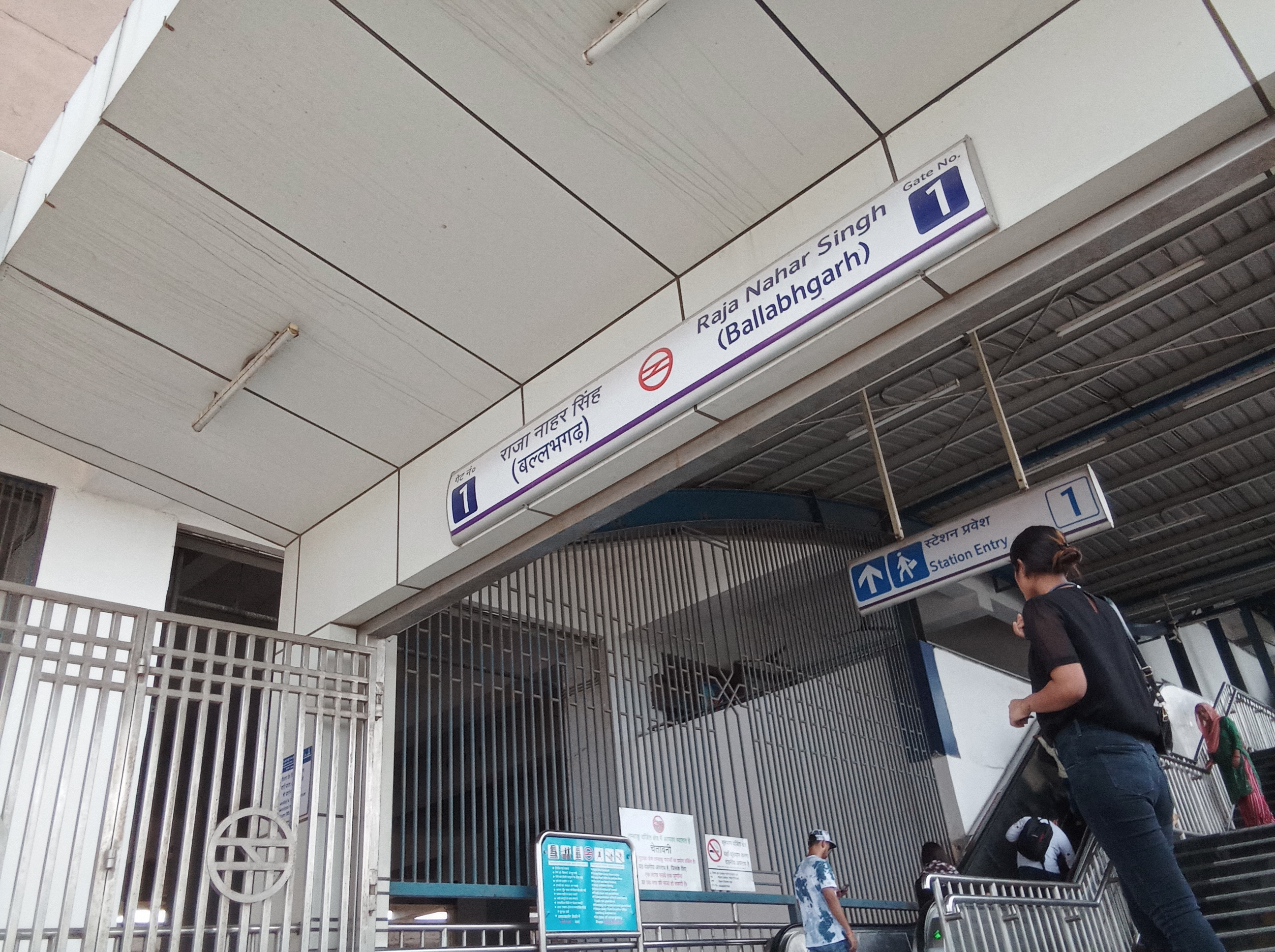

General information
- Location: Ballabhgarh, Faridabad, Haryana 121004
- Coordinates: 28°20′23″N 77°18′59″E
- System: Delhi Metro station
- Owner: Delhi Metro
- Operator: Delhi Metro Rail Corporation (DMRC)
- Line: Violet Line
- Platforms: side platform; Platform-1 → Terminus; Platform-2 → Kashmere Gate
- Tracks: 2
- Connections: Ballabhgarh

Construction
- Structure type: Elevated, Double-track
- Platform levels: 2
- Accessible: Yes

Other information
- Status: Staffed, Operational
- Station code: BVHM

History
- Opened: 19 November 2018; 8 years ago
- Electrified: 25 kV 50 Hz AC through overhead catenary
- Former names: Ballabhgarh metro station

Services
Preceding station	Delhi Metro	Following station
Sant Surdas (Sihi) towards Kashmere Gate	Violet Line	Terminus
Route map
Location

Raja Nahar Singh (Ballabhgarh) (formerly known as Ballabhgarh) is an elevated terminal metro station on the Violet Line of the Delhi Metro, located in Ballabhgarh, Faridabad, Haryana. It serves as the southern terminus of the Violet Line.

== History ==
In July 2018, Haryana Finance Minister Captain Abhimanyu urged Chief Minister Manohar Lal Khattar to rename Ballabhgarh metro station after Raja Nahar Singh, the 19th-century ruler of Ballabhgarh who was executed by the British following the Indian Rebellion of 1857. The request followed a campaign by local social organisations seeking to honour the ruler.

On 13 September 2018, the Haryana government announced that Ballabhgarh metro station would be renamed Raja Nahar Singh metro station. The station was opened to passengers on 19 November 2018 as part of the Violet Line's extension from Escorts Mujesar to Ballabhgarh.

== Station layout ==
L2	Side platform | Doors will open on the left
L2	Platform 1 Southbound	Towards → Train Terminates Here
L2	Platform 2 Northbound	Towards ← Kashmere Gate; Next Station: Sant Surdas (Sihi)
L2	Side platform | Doors will open on the left
L1	Concourse	Fare control, station agent, Metro Card vending machines, crossover
G	Street Level	Exit/Entrance

== See also ==
- Delhi
- Faridabad
- Haryana
- Nahar Singh
- Ballabhgarh
- National Highway 44 (India)
- List of Delhi Metro stations
- Transport in Delhi
- Delhi Metro Rail Corporation
- Delhi Suburban Railway
- Delhi Monorail
- Delhi Transport Corporation
- Faridabad district
- New Delhi
- National Capital Region (India)
- National Capital Region Transport Corporation
- List of rapid transit systems
- List of metro systems
