= Kashmere Gate metro station =

Metro station in Delhi, India

Kashmere Gate

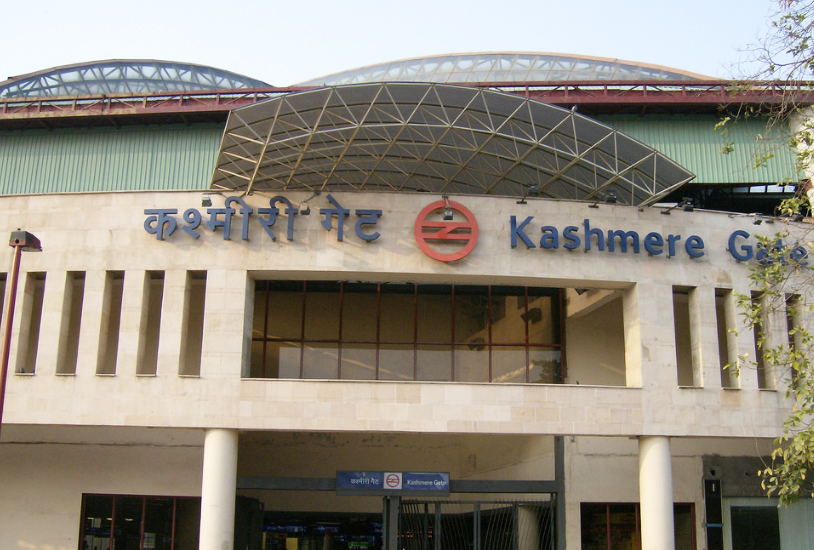

General information
- Location: Lothian Rd, Inter State Bus Terminal, Kashmere Gate, Old Delhi, Delhi, 110006
- Coordinates: 28°40′03″N 77°13′41″E
- System: Delhi Metro station
- Owner: Delhi Metro
- Line: Red Line Yellow Line Violet Line
- Platforms: Island platform (Yellow Line); Platform-1 → Millennium City Centre Gurugram; Platform-2 → Samaypur Badli Side platform (Red Line); Platform-3 → Rithala; Platform-4 → Shaheed Sthal (New Bus Adda) Island platform (Violet Line); Platform-5 → Raja Nahar Singh (Ballabhgarh); Platform 6 → Terminus
- Tracks: 6
- Connections: Kashmere Gate ISBT

Construction
- Structure type: Elevated (Red Line); Underground (Yellow Line); Underground (Violet Line)
- Platform levels: 3
- Parking: Available
- Accessible: Yes

Other information
- Station code: KG

History
- Opened: 25 December 2002 (Red Line); 20 December 2004 (Yellow Line); 28 May 2017 (Violet Line)
- Electrified: 25 kV 50 Hz AC through overhead catenary

Passengers
- October 2019: 268,761
- October 2023: 250,386 ▼6.8%

Services
Preceding station	Delhi Metro	Following station
Tis Hazari towards Rithala	Red Line	Shastri Park towards Shaheed Sthal (New Bus Adda)
Civil Lines towards Samaypur Badli	Yellow Line	Chandni Chowk towards Millennium City Centre Gurugram
Terminus	Violet Line	Lal Qila towards Raja Nahar Singh (Ballabhgarh)
Route map
Location

Kashmere Gate is a triple-interchange metro station on the Red, Yellow and Violet Lines of the Delhi Metro. It has a distinctive multi-level structure, with the elevated Red Line at the highest level and the underground Yellow and Violet Lines at separate levels below. The station facilitates interchange between all three corridors and is the only operational station in the Delhi Metro network connecting three lines.

Kashmere Gate was formerly the busiest metro station in the Delhi Metro network, owing to its high passenger footfall and interchange facilities. It was opened on 25 December 2002 as part of the Red Line. The station subsequently became an interchange with the Yellow Line and, in May 2017, the Violet Line.

Kashmere Gate metro station serves the historic Kashmere Gate area of Delhi. With a total floor area of approximately 11,000 square metres (120,000 sq ft) across its multiple levels, it is the largest interchange station in the Delhi Metro network by area.

== Phase III connections ==
Under Phase III of the Delhi Metro expansion, the Violet Line was extended northwards from ITO to Kashmere Gate, creating an interchange with the Red and Yellow Lines at Kashmere Gate station. The extension provided an alternative route between Central Secretariat and Kashmere Gate via the Violet Line and reduced passenger pressure on the Yellow Line stations of Chandni Chowk and Chawri Bazar. The 5.17 km (3.21 mi) ITO–Kashmere Gate section, known as the Heritage Line, was inaugurated on 28 May 2017 by the then Union Minister for Urban Development, M. Venkaiah Naidu, and Delhi Chief Minister Arvind Kejriwal.

== Station layout ==
Station layout Red Line

P	Side platform | Doors will open on the left
P	Platform 3 Westbound	Towards ← Rithala; Next Station: Tis Hazari
P	Side platform | Doors will open on the left
P	Platform 4 Eastbound	Towards → Shaheed Sthal (New Bus Adda); Next Station: Shastri Park
C	Concourse	Fare control, station agent, token vending and automatic vending machines, crossover
G	Street Level	Gates

Station layout Yellow Line

G	Street Level	Gates
C	Concourse	Fare control, station agent, token vending and automatic vending machines, crossover
P	Platform 1 Southbound	Towards → Millennium City Centre Gurugram; Next Station: Chandni Chowk
P	Island platform | Doors will open on the right
P	Platform 2 Northbound	Towards ← Samaypur Badli; Next Station: Civil Lines

Station layout Violet Line

G	Street Level	Gates
C	Concourse	Fare control, station agent, token vending and automatic vending machines, crossover
P	Platform 5 Southbound	Towards ← Raja Nahar Singh (Ballabhgarh); Next Station: Lal Qila
P	Island platform | Doors will open on the right
P	Platform 6 Northbound	Towards → Train Terminates Here

== Entry/Exits ==
Kashmere Gate metro station: Entry/Exits
Gate No-1	Gate No-2	Gate No-3	Gate No-4	Gate No-5	Gate No-6	Gate No-7	Gate No-8
Mori Gate	—	Lala Hardev Sahai Marg	Lala Hardev Sahai Marg	Lala Hardev Sahai Marg	Lala Hardev Sahai Marg	ISBT Kashmere Gate	ISBT Kashmere Gate

== Connections ==
=== Bus ===
- Kashmere Gate ISBT: bus services between Delhi and the neighbouring states and UTs of Haryana, Jammu and Kashmir, Ladakh, Punjab, Himachal Pradesh, Uttar Pradesh, Rajasthan and Uttarakhand operate from here.
- Delhi Metro feeder buses:
  - Feeder bus service MC-127 starts from Kashmere Gate metro station and ends at Harsh Vihar in North-East Delhi. The service passes through the following bus stops: Shastri Park metro station, Shyam Giri Mata mandir, Delhi IT Park (Shastri Park), Zero Pushta, New Usmanpur, Usmanpur, Doosra Pushta, Teesra Pushta, Kartar Nagar, Gamri Extension, Jagram Vatika, Garhi Mendu, Khajuri Chowk, Bhajanpura, Yamuna Vihar, Gokulpuri metro station, Gokulpuri village, Loni roundabout, Meet Nagar and Gagan Cinema.

=== Rail ===
Kashmere Gate metro station is located near Old Delhi railway station. Although the two stations are in close proximity, they do not have a direct interchange facility. Old Delhi railway station is directly connected to Chandni Chowk metro station on the Yellow Line through a 400 metres (1,300 ft) long underground subway, which provides access to the metro network.

== See also ==
- Transport in Delhi
