= Faridabad district =

Coordinates: 28.404°N 77.319°E

- District of Haryana
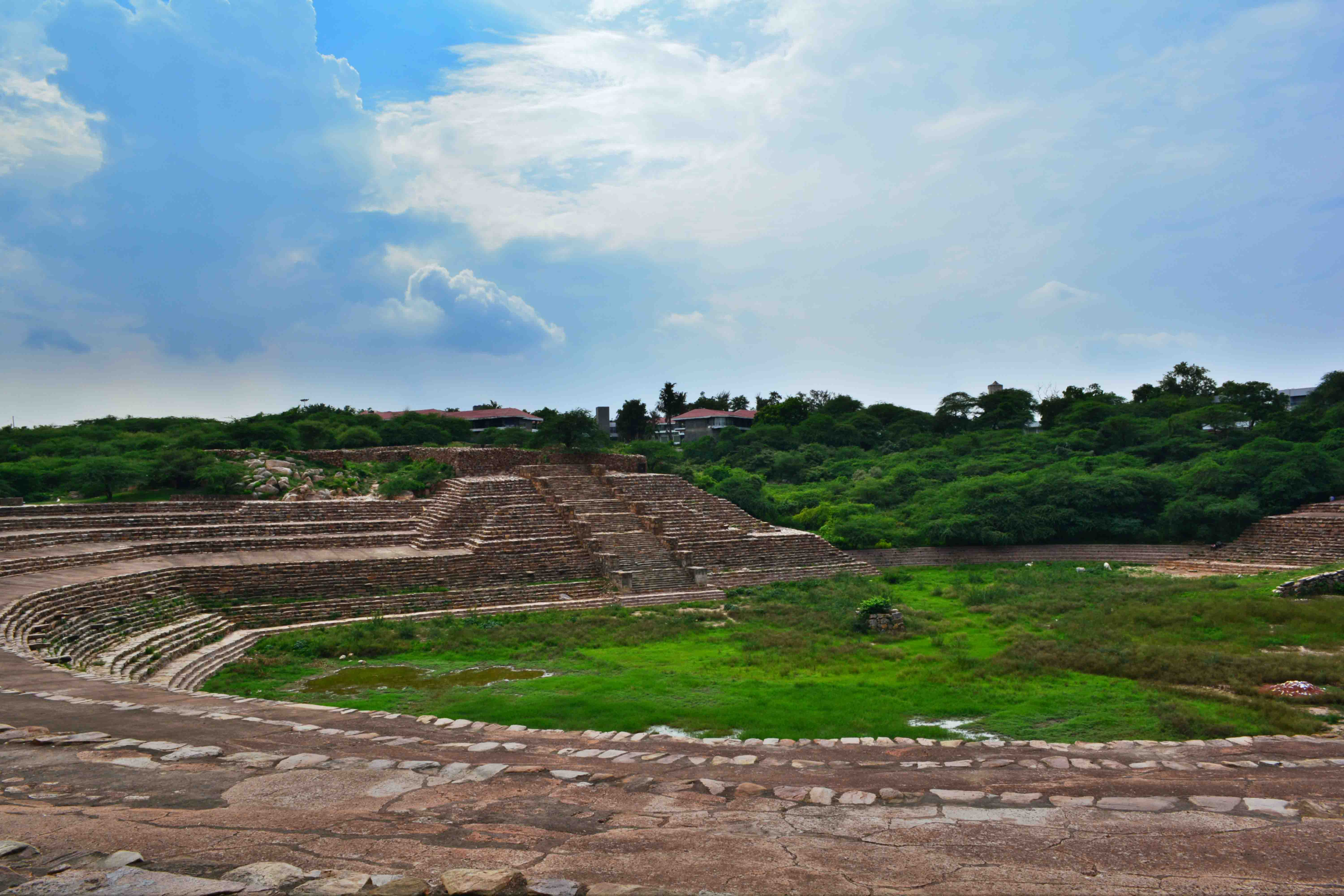
- Surajkund

- Location in Haryana
- Country: India
- State: Haryana
- Division: Faridabad
- Founder: Sheikh Farid treasurer of Jahangir(Mughal dynasty)
- Named for: Sheikh Farid
- Headquarters: Faridabad
- Sub-Division: 1. Faridabad, 2. Ballabgarh, 3. Badkhal

Area
  - Total: 742.9 km^{2} (286.8 sq mi)

Population (2011)
  - Total: 1,809,733
  - Density: 2,436/km^{2} (6,309/sq mi)

Demographics
  - Literacy: 81.7%
- Time zone: UTC+05:30 (IST)
- Website: faridabad.nic.in

Faridabad district is one of the 23 districts of the Indian state of Haryana with Faridabad city being the district headquarters. The District is a Part of Central National Capital Region of Delhi. The Delhi-Mathura-Agra National Highway 44 (Grand Trunk Road) passes through the centre of the district, which occupies an area of 741 square kilometres (286 sq mi) and as of the 2011 census of India, had a population of 1,809,733. Haryana government has created a new Faridabad division which would cover the districts – Faridabad, Nuh and Palwal.

As of 2011, it was the second most populous district of Haryana after Gurugram district.

== Etymology ==
The district is named after its headquarters, Faridabad city, which in turn is named after its founder, Shaikh Farid, the treasurer of Jahangir who built a town here. On Talab Road near Gopi Colony (Old Faridabad), his tomb or maqbara can still be seen.

== History ==
The district was carved out of Gurugram District on 15 August 1979.The district lies in the cultural region of Braj. Tilpat (then "Tilprastha"), a town near the district's most populous city, Faridabad, was one of the five villages demanded by Pandavas to avert a disastrous war.

== Sub-Divisions ==
The Faridabad district is headed by an IAS officer of the rank of Deputy Commissioner (DC) who is the chief executive officer of the district. The district is divided into 3 sub-divisions, each headed by a Sub-Divisional Magistrate (SDM): Faridabad, Ballabgarh and Badkhal.

== Assembly constituencies ==
There are 6 Haryana Vidhan Sabha constituencies located in this district: Prithla, Faridabad NIT, Badkhal, Ballabgarh, Faridabad and Tigaon. All 6 are part of the Faridabad Lok Sabha constituency.

== Economy ==
Faridabad was formerly Haryana's leading industrial city and a popular choice for setting up industry due to its location on the Delhi-Mathura Road. However, the emergence of Gurgaon as a powerhouse for industrial development in the state has led to its decline. The city is noted for its henna production in the agriculture sector while tractors, motorcycles, switch gears, refrigerators, shoes and tyres are other products made in the city.

== Education ==
- Dynasty International School, established 1979

== Demographics ==
Historical population
Year	Pop.	±% p.a.
1901	116,564	—
1911	101,645	−1.36%
1921	94,680	−0.71%
1931	103,496	+0.89%
1941	118,983	+1.40%
1951	128,508	+0.77%
1961	179,815	+3.42%
1971	322,999	+6.03%
1981	517,597	+4.83%
1991	859,442	+5.20%
2001	1,365,465	+4.74%
2011	1,809,733	+2.86%

According to the 2011 census, Faridabad district has a population of 1,809,733. This gives it a ranking of 266th in India (out of a total of 640). The district has a population density of 2,442 inhabitants per square kilometre (6,320/sq mi). Its population growth rate over the decade 2001–2011 was 31.75%. Faridabad has a sex ratio of 873 females for every 1000 males, and a literacy rate of 83%. Scheduled Castes make up 12.37% of the population.

Religion in Faridabad district (2011)
Religion	Percent
Hinduism	87.77%
Islam	8.93%
Sikhism	1.91%
Christianity	0.54%
Other or not stated	0.85%

Languages of Faridabad district (2011)
1. Hindi (88.0%)
2. Punjabi (3.74%)
3. Haryanvi (2.66%)
4. Bhojpuri (1.47%)
5. Others (4.16%)

At the time of the 2011 Census of India, 87.97% of the population spoke Hindi, 3.74% Punjabi, 2.66% Haryanvi and 1.47% Bhojpuri as their first language. The local dialect is Braj Bhasha.
