= Doon Valley =

Valley

Coordinates: 30.361°N 77.992°E

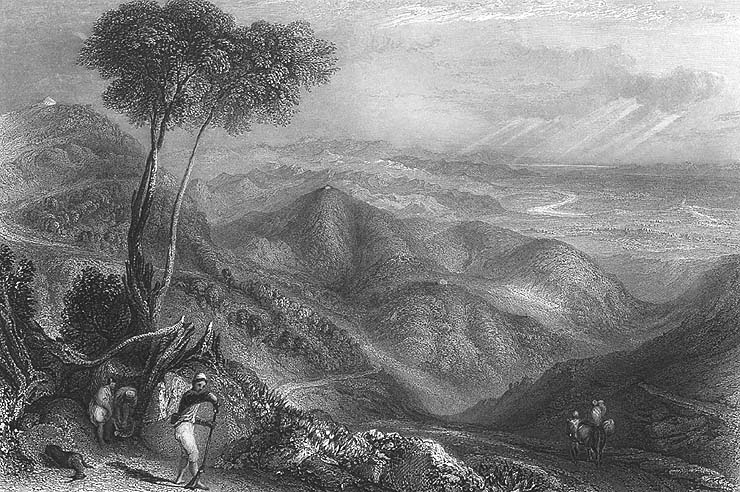
Doon Valley, Dehradun, 1850s

The Doon Valley is an unusually wide, long valley within the Sivalik Hills and the Lesser Himalayas, in the Indian states of Uttarakhand and Himachal Pradesh. It is closer to Kyarda Doon, which lies in Himachal Pradesh. Within the valley lies the city of Dehradun, the winter capital of Uttarakhand state.

== Geography ==
The Doon Valley lies between two intermittent ranges of the Himalayas, the Outer Himalayas (a.k.a. the Siwalik Hills) to the south and the Lesser Himalayas, known locally as the Mussoorie Range. It is bounded on all sides by mountains, with northern range running from Kalsi in the west to Muni Ki Reti in the east with Mussoorie at the centre in a semi-circular arc; and southern range running at south from Paonta Sahib in the west to Haridwar in the east. The valley also forms a watershed between the Yamuna and Ganges river systems. In fact, the Yamuna and Ganges are closest to each other as they pass the Doon valley, with the Yamuna forming the western boundary and the Ganges the east. It runs 75 km long from west to east.

The Doon Valley is ecologically rich, particularly with regard to birdlife, with over 500 bird species having been recorded within the valley and in the surrounding areas, including the Mussoorie Hills and Rajaji National Park. The Reserved Forests and community forests in the region, in and around the valley are also botanically rich in terms of hardwood deciduous forests (esp. Sal or Shorea robusta, and Teak), flowering and fruiting trees, natural wetlands, and Terai and Bhabar ecosystems. Several rivers (e.g. Song, Tons, Suswa, Jakhan, Rispana and Asan) and a number of lesser streams flow through the valley, having their sources in either the Mussoorie Hills or the Sivalik Hills; all local rivers ultimately flow into either the Ganges or the Yamuna. Other than Rajaji National Park, the local protected areas include Asan Barrage Conservation Reserve and Jhilmil Jheel Conservation Reserve, with the 1000-acre campus of the Forest Research Institute in Dehradun representing another Important Bird Area (IBA).

The valley is known for pleasant summers but winter temperatures may drop below the freezing point.

== Important areas ==
Rajaji National Park, Mahasu region including Jaunsar-Bawar adjoin the valley as well.

=== Towns ===
In Uttarakhand:

- Dehradun
- Dehradun Cantonment
- Clement Town
- FRI and College Area
- Raipur
- Vikasnagar
- Sahaspur
- Herbertpur
- Dakpathar
- Doiwala
- Rishikesh
- Dhalwala
- Muni Ki Reti
- Virbhadra
- Pratitnagar

In Himachal Pradesh:

- Paonta Sahib

== See also ==
- List of valleys of India
- Inner Terai Valleys of Nepal
