= Bijapur Dam =

- Interactive map of Bijapur Dam
- Official name: Bijapur Canal
- Country: India
- Location: Garhi Cantt, Dehra Dun, India
- Coordinates: 30.35465°N 78.03593°E

Dam and spillways
- Type of dam: Check Dam

Bijapur Dam is situated in the Garhi Cantonment area of Dehradun, Uttarakhand, India. The Bijapur check dam was built on the Tons river close to Karkuli valley by Britishers in the year 1841, witnessing the civil engineering proficiency of British official Sir Proby Thomas Cautley, who worked on this one of the oldest check dams in Uttarakhand to improve the water supply in the region.

== History ==
Cautley created the blueprints and cost estimates for the Bijapur Canal, but Captain Kirke—at the time the adjutant of the Sirmur Battalion—supervised the construction of the works. In the month of January 1841, water was allowed into the canal.

=== The Head works ===
A mountain stream called Tons that drains the Karkuli valley provides water for the Bijapur canal. Captain Cautley took advantage of some sizable chunks of rock that had fallen into the riverbed close to the left bank directly beneath the settlement of Bijapur when determining the immediate location for the head works. The head was constructed entirely of loose rocks prior to 1858. In order to provide a full and constant supply of water during the rains, the canal was built with new head works that included scouring sluices, shrines, and grills, while also excluding pebbles and shingles.

== See also ==
- Dehradun canals
- Dakpathar Barrage
