= Asan Barrage =

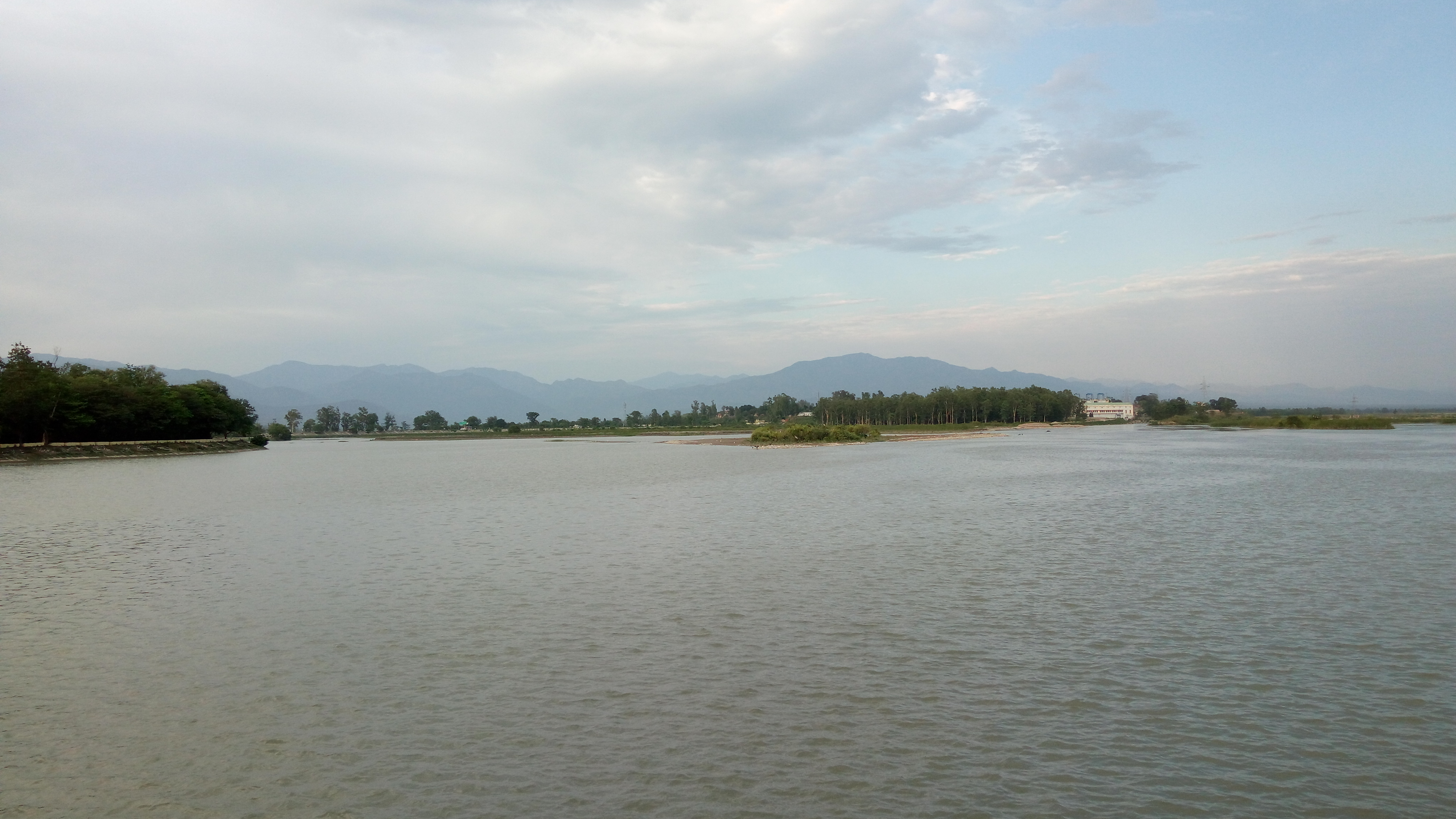

- Location within Uttarakhand
- Interactive map of Asan Barrage
- Country: India
- Location: Dakpathar, Uttarakhand
- Coordinates: 30°26′09″N 77°39′56″E
- Opening date: 1967

Dam and spillways
- Length: 287.5 m (943 ft)

Reservoir
- Surface area: 4 km^{2} (2 mi^{2})

Power Station
- Commission date: Kulhal: 1975
- Turbines: Kulhal: 3 x 10 MW Kaplan-type; Khara: 3 x 24 MW Francis-type
- Installed capacity: Kulhal: 30 MW; Khara: 72 MW

Ramsar Wetland
- Official name: Asan Conservation Reserve
- Designated: 21 July 2020
- Reference no.: 2437

The Asan Barrage is a barrage in the Uttarakhand-Himachal Pradesh border region in Doon Valley (Dehradun district), northern India, situated at the confluence of the Eastern Yamuna Canal and the Asan River and about 11 km (7 mi) from Dakpathar, and 28 km northwest of Dehradun in Uttarakhand. The barrage is 287.5 m long and has water throughout the year which is fed from the river Asan and the discharge channel of the river Yamuna. Since 2020, it has been declared Uttarakhand's first Ramsar site.

Directly behind the barrage on its eastern flank, water reenters the Eastern Yamuna Canal on the west side of the Yamuna River. At a distance of 4.5 km (3 mi) from the barrage on the canal, water reaches the 30 MW Kulhal Power Plant at 30°25′43″N 77°37′46″E. The power plant contains three 10 MW Kaplan turbine-generators and has a design hydraulic head of 18 m (59 ft). Once discharged from the power station, the water is conducted by the canal 13 km (8 mi) to the 72 MW Khara Power Station at 30°21′02″N 77°36′06″E in Uttar Pradesh. The Khara Power Station contains three 24 MW Francis turbine-generators and a has a net head of 43 m (141 ft).

The dam creates the Asan Reservoir, also called Dhalipur Lake. The lake is popular for bird watching and 53 species are known to make a habitat there, of which 19 are migratory species from Eurasia.

== Asan River ==
The Asan river is a river fed by the streams of the western part of the Doon Valley. The northern section of the river is known locally as the 'Tons' (a misnomer, the actual Tons River is much larger and flows into the Yamuna in the Jaunsar-Bawar region at Kalsi); originates from the southern slopes of Mussoorie. There are several streams here, that gradually merge into one river that emerges from Robber's Cave. The river here is in a U-shaped valley meandering slightly in a south-westerly direction. The river flows through Bijapur canal; a major water pumping site of Dehradun that provides water to houses in the western part of the town through two water canals. It then moves on to Tapkeshwar Mahadev, a popular Shiva shrine before becoming a more shallow, broad valley near Premnagar. The river proceeds south-west, receiving the waters of several streams flowing southward from the northern range spanning Vikasnagar–Mussoorie; and northward from the lower Sivalik Hills that separate The Doon Valley from Saharanpur district of Uttar Pradesh. In the lower section it is known as the 'Asan'. It flows into a relatively flat section which feeds the Asan Barrage, the waters of which drain into the Yamuna at Paonta Sahib in Himachal Pradesh.

The Asan River has been identified with the Asmanvati of the Rigveda.

== Asan Barrage Bird Sanctuary ==
The Bird Sanctuary was established in 1967 as a manmade wetland where rivers Yamuna and Asan converged. This area attracts a large number of migratory birds, including birds that are extremely endangered and in the IUCN Red list. Since 2020 the wetland has been designated as a protected Ramsar site.

The best time to visit the Barrage is between October and December, and between mid-March to the end of April. The barrage is open all days of the week, from 8am to 6pm. Boating and bird-watching are two activities that tourists enjoy here.

== See also ==
- Dakpathar Barrage
- Dehradun canals
