= Vikasnagar =

- city
- Location in Uttarakhand, India Vikasnagar (India)
- Coordinates: 30.468°N 77.774°E
- Country: India
- State: Uttarakhand
- District: Dehradun
- Elevation: 452 m (1,483 ft)

Population (2001)
  - Total: 12,485

Languages
  - Official: Hindi
  - Native: Jaunsari, Sirmauri
- Time zone: UTC+5:30 (IST)
- PIN: 248198
- Telephone code: 01360
- Vehicle registration: UK-16
- Website: uk.gov.in

Vikasnagar is a city and a municipality in Dehradun district in the Indian state of Uttarakhand. Vikas Nagar is also a tehsil in Dehradun district. It is situated at the border of Uttarakhand and Himachal Pradesh.

It is also known as Pachawadoon (Western Doon) and is the second financial and economic hub of Dehradun district, after the city of Dehradun. Vikasnagar was earlier known for its tea gardens, exporting tea to other countries. But now due to years of constant neglect and lack of skilled labor, it has lost its reputation.

Vikasnagar is also famous for Basmati rice and fruits like litchi and Dussehri mangoes. Vikasnagar, along with Herbertpur, is the chief marketplace area for the people of Jaunsar-Bawar.

== Etymology ==
Vikasnagar was formerly known as Chauhadpur Nardidih. After independence, several hydroelectric power projects were laid in the region because of which the region witnessed a spurt in growth and development activities. Hence the name was changed to Vikasnagar from Chauhadpur by the then Union Cabinet Minister for Rehabilitation (former Minister for Defence Organisation), the Late Shri Mahavir Tyagi. Shri Tyagi was at this time, in 1965, also the Member of Parliament from the area and had represented the area since well before independence at the provincial level and, in the post-independence years, at the parliamentary level; his decision was immediately accepted. The name was considered appropriate also in view of various development activities in the area such as the Dakpathar Barrage and the Dhakrani, Kulhaal, Dhalipur, and Chibro powerhouses.

== Geography ==
It has an average elevation of 452 metres (1,483 feet). Vikasnagar lies along the river Yamuna, nearly 40 km north west of Dehradun, the capital of Uttarakhand. Vikasnagar and adjoining Herbertpur and Dakpathar are collectively known as "Gateway to Jaunsar" since they form the last plain before Jaunsar Bawar.

== Transport ==
Vikasnagar is connected to Dehradun by the NH72. It can be reached by cars and buses. The nearest railway station is in Dehradun (40 kilometers). Nearest airport is Jolly Grant Airport, Dehradun (60 Kilometers).

NH123 passes through Vikasnagar which starts from Delhi and reaches Yamnotri which is the originating place of holy river Yamuna.

== Demographics ==
As of 2001, Vikasnagar had a population of 12,485. Males constitute 53% of the population and females 47%. Vikasnagar has an average literacy rate of 76%, higher than the national average of 59.5%: male literacy is 79%, and female literacy is 73%. 12% of the population is under 6 years The city borders on Jaunsar and Himachal Pradesh (Mahasu region). Jaunsari and Sirmauri are most spoken dialects in and around the city.

== Places to visit ==
The chief tourist spots in Vikasnagar are Dakpathar Barrage, Katta Pather, Gautam Ashram, Koti Dam, Ashoka Rock, Gurudwara Bhangani Sahib (Himachal Pradesh,) MahaKali Mandir, and Shani Dham.

The nearest hill station is Chakrata, which is nearly 45 km by road from Vikasnagar.

It lies close to Paonta Sahib and Dehradun.
