= Yamuna =

River in India

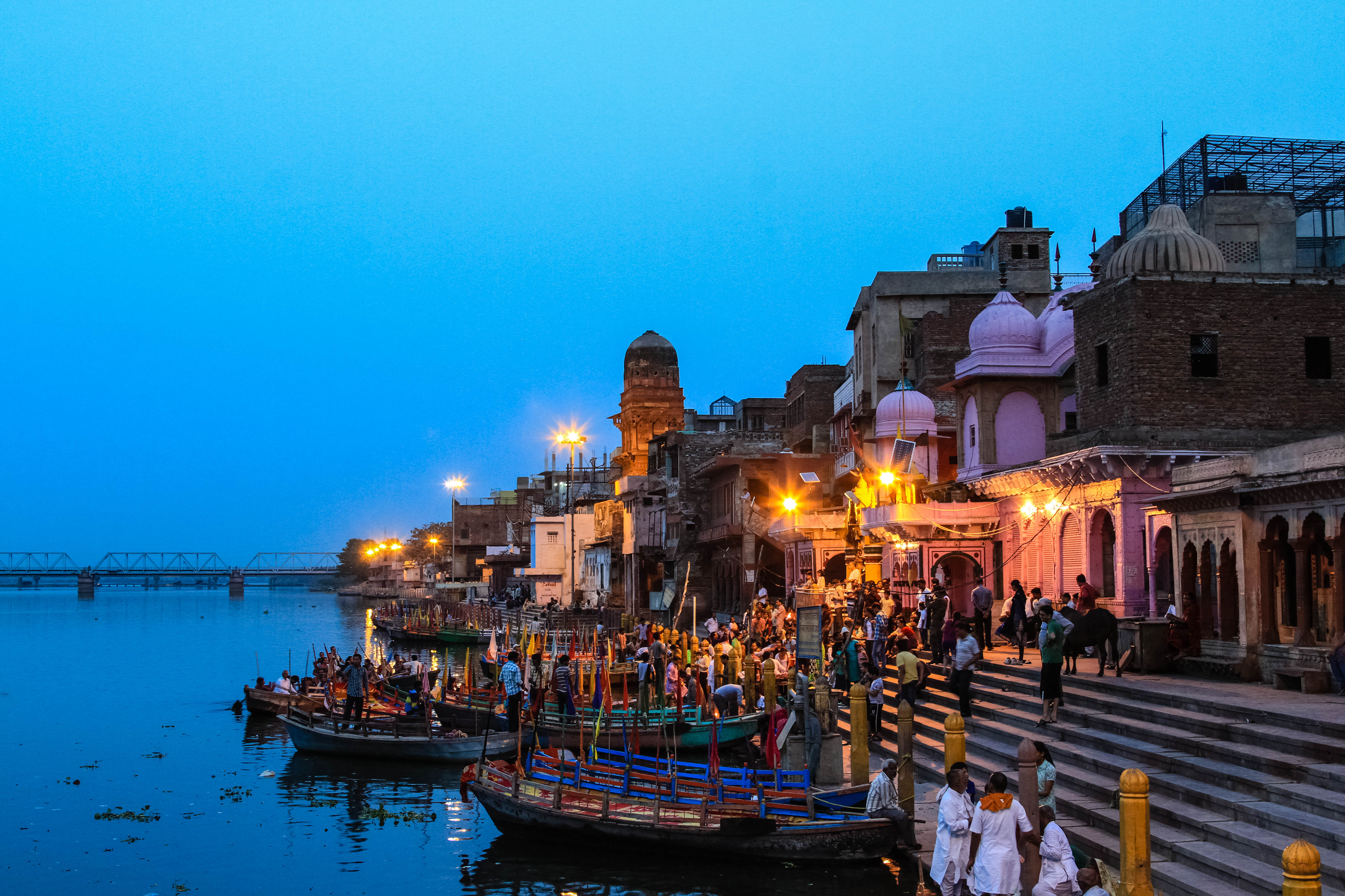
- Vishram Ghat, on the Yamuna at Mathura in Uttar Pradesh

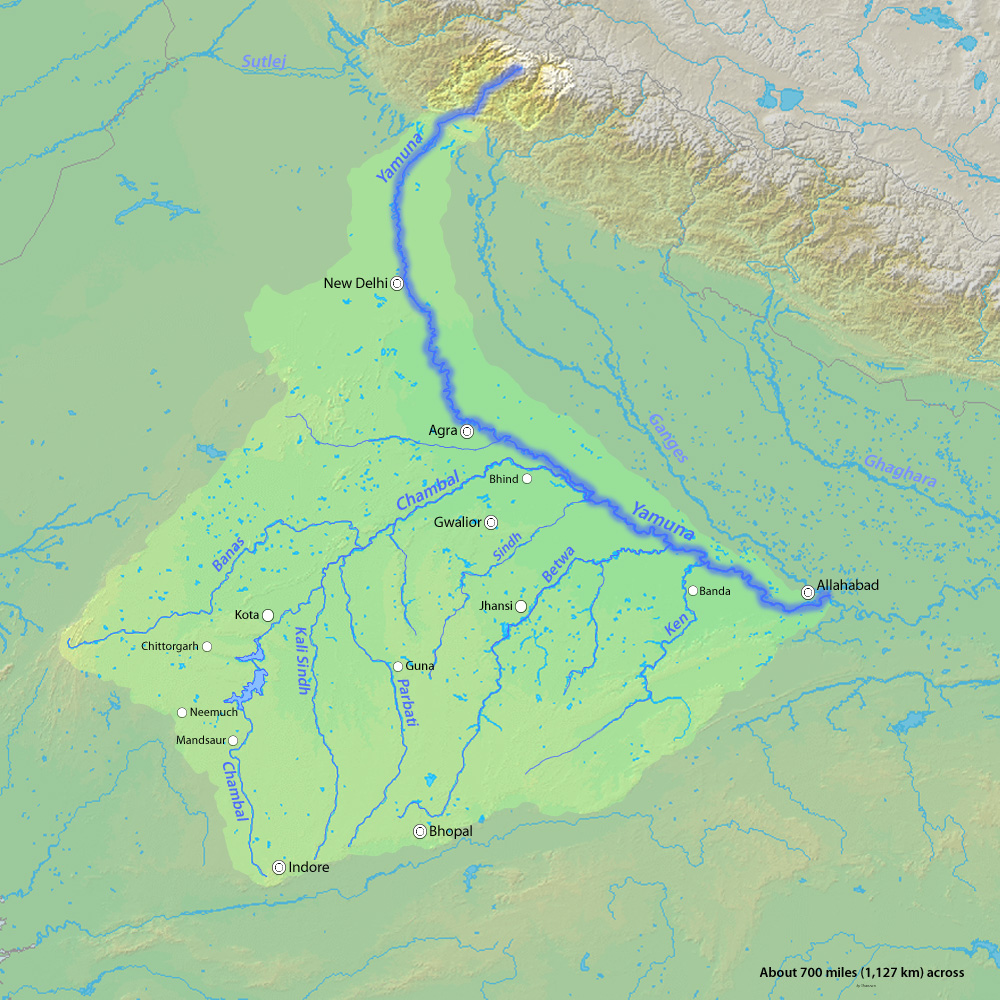
- Map

Location
- Country: India
- State: Uttarakhand; Himachal Pradesh; Haryana; Delhi; Uttar Pradesh
- Cities: Uttarakhand: Vikasnagar; Himachal Pradesh: Paonta Sahib; Haryana: Yamunanagar; Faridabad; Delhi; Uttar Pradesh: Kairana; Baghpat; Ghaziabad; Noida; Greater Noida; Vrindavan; Mathura; Agra; Firozabad; Etawah; Auraiya; Kalpi; Hamirpur; Prayagraj

Physical characteristics
- Source: Yamunotri
  - location: Banderpooch peaks, Uttarkashi district, Uttarakhand, India
  - coordinates: 31°1′21″N 78°27′18″E
  - elevation: 4,500 m (14,800 ft)
- Mouth: Ganges
  - location: Triveni Sangam, Prayagraj, India
  - coordinates: 25°25′21″N 81°53′15″E
  - elevation: 84 m (276 ft)
- Length: 1,376 km (855 mi)
- Basin size: 366,223 km^{2} (141,399 sq mi)
- Discharge
  - location: Prayagraj
  - average: 2,950 m^{3}/s (104,000 cu ft/s)

Basin features
- Tributaries
  - left: Hindon River; Hanuman Ganga; Sasur Khaderi
  - right: Tons River; Giri Ganga; Baghain; Sabi; Chambal; Sindh; Betwa; Ken

The Yamuna (pronounced [jəmʊnɑː]; IAST: Yamunā) is the second-largest tributary river of the Ganges by discharge and the longest tributary in India. Originating from the Yamunotri Glacier at a height of about 4,500 m (14,800 ft) on the southwestern slopes of Bandarpunch peaks of the Lower Himalaya in Uttarakhand. It then enters Himachal Pradesh before following in to the Indo-Gangetic plains of Uttar Pradesh and Haryana. It travels 1,376 kilometres (855 mi) and drains an area of 366,223 square kilometres (141,399 mi^{2}), 40.2% of the entire Ganges Basin. It merges with the Ganges at Triveni Sangam, Prayagraj, which is a site of the Kumbh Mela, a Hindu festival held every 12 years.

Like the Ganges, the Yamuna is highly venerated in Hinduism and worshipped as the goddess Yamuna. In Hinduism, she is believed to be the daughter of the sun god, Surya, and the sister of Yama, the god of death, and so she is also known as Yami. According to popular Hindu legends, bathing in Yamuna's sacred waters frees one from the torments of death.

The river crosses several states such as Uttarakhand, Himachal Pradesh, Haryana, Delhi and Uttar Pradesh. It also meets several tributaries along the way, including Tons, Chambal, its longest tributary which has its own large basin, followed by Sindh, the Betwa, and Ken. From Uttarakhand, the river flows into the state of Himachal Pradesh. After passing Paonta Sahib, Yamuna flows along the boundary of Haryana and Uttar Pradesh and after exiting Haryana it continues to flow till it merges with the river Ganges at Sangam or Prayag in Prayagraj (Uttar Pradesh). It helps create the highly fertile alluvial Ganges-Yamuna Doab region between itself and the Ganges in the Indo-Gangetic Plain.

Nearly 57 million people depend on the Yamuna's waters, and the river accounts for more than 70 percent of Delhi's water supply. It has an annual flow of 97 billion cubic metres, and nearly 4 billion cubic metres are consumed every year (of which irrigation constitutes 96%). At the Hathni Kund Barrage, its waters are diverted into two large canals: the Western Yamuna Canal flowing towards Haryana, and the Eastern Yamuna Canal flowing towards Uttar Pradesh. Beyond that point the Yamuna is joined by the Somb, a seasonal rivulet from Haryana, and by the highly polluted Hindon River near Noida, by Najafgarh drain near Wazirabad and by various other drains, so that it continues only as a trickling sewage-bearing drain before joining the Chambal at Pachnada in the Etawah District of Uttar Pradesh.

The water quality in Upper Yamuna, as the 375-kilometre (233 mi) long stretch of the Yamuna is called from its origin at Yamunotri to Okhla barrage, is of "reasonably good quality" until the Wazirabad barrage in Delhi. Below this, the discharge of wastewater in Delhi through 15 drains between Wazirabad barrage and Okhla barrage renders the river severely polluted. Wazirabad barrage to Okhla Barrage, 22 km (14 mi) stretch of the Yamuna in Delhi, is less than 2% of the Yamuna's total length but accounts for nearly 80% of the total pollution in the river. Untreated wastewater and poor quality of water discharged from the wastewater treatment plants are the major reasons of the Yamuna's pollution in Delhi. To address river pollution, measures have been taken by the Ministry of Environment and Forests (MoEF) under the Yamuna Action Plan (YAP) which has been implemented since 1993 by the MoEF's National River Conservation Directorate (NRCD).

== Basin ==
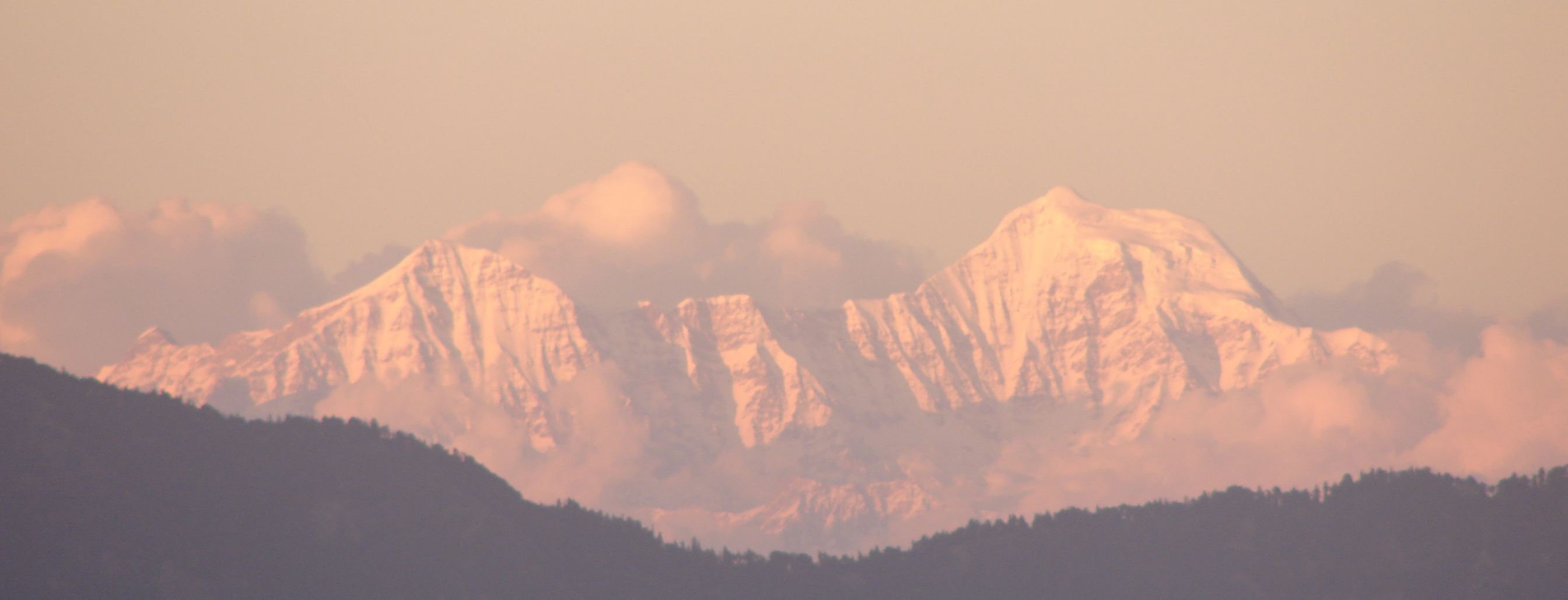
Banderpoonch peak, the source of Yamuna, as seen from Mussoorie

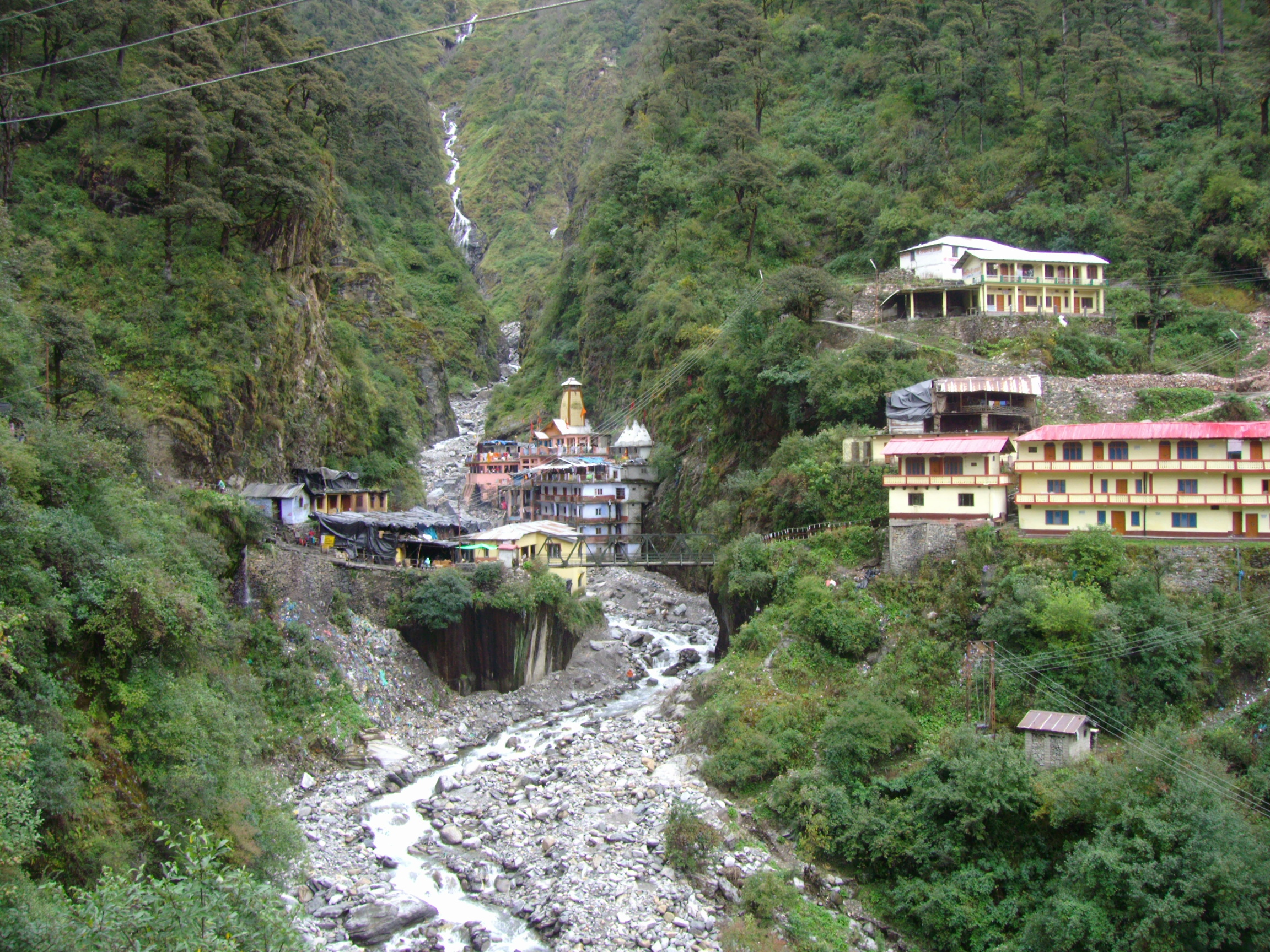
The Yamunotri temple on the river, dedicated to Goddess Yamuna

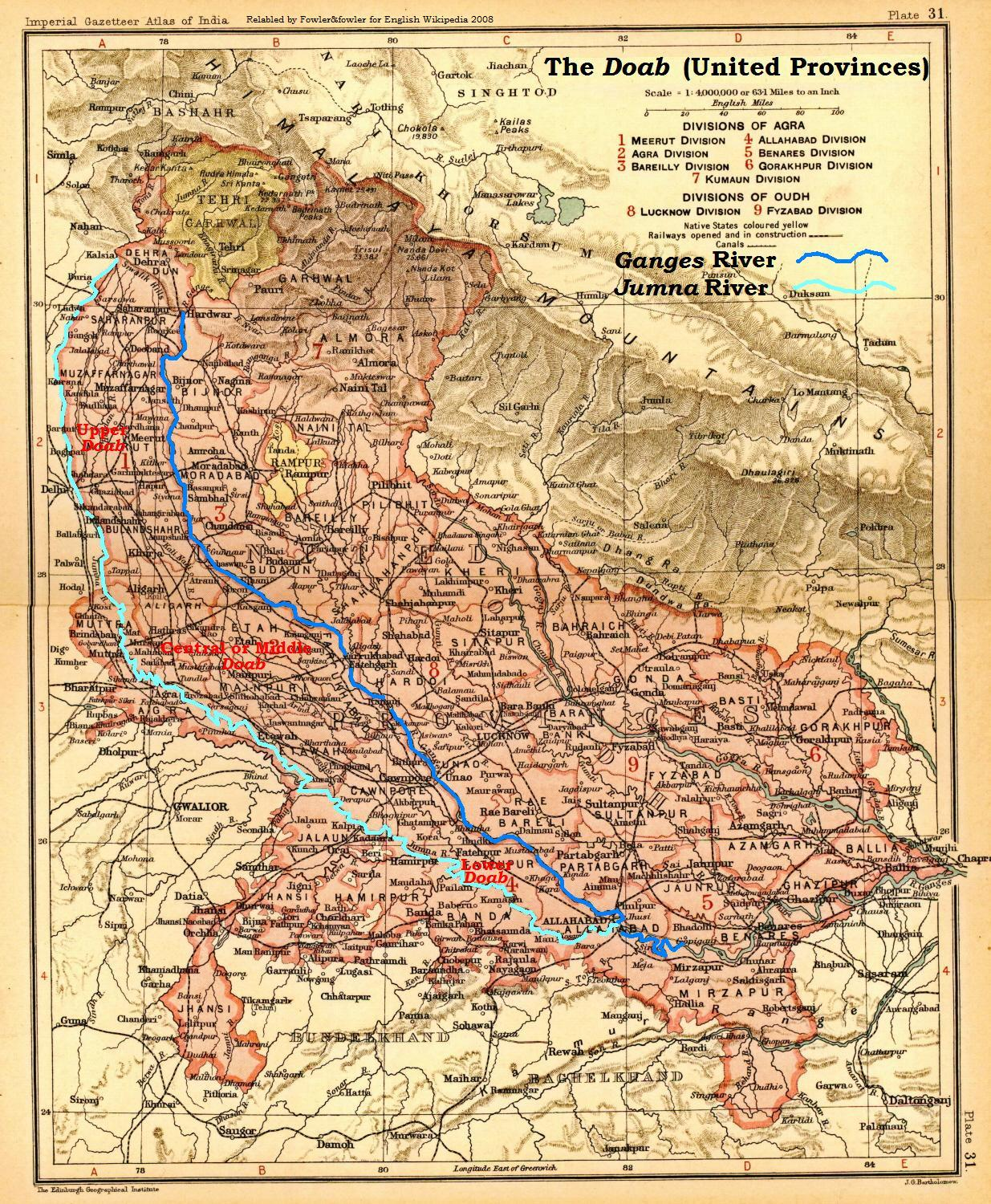
The Doab, United Provinces, 1908

=== Palaeochannels: Sarasvati's tributary ===
The present Sarsuti river, which originates in the Shivalik hills in Himachal and Haryana border and merges with Ghaggar River near Pehowa, is the palaeochannel of Yamuna. Yamuna changed its course to the east due to a shift in the slope of the Earth's crust caused by plate tectonics.

=== Sources: Banderpoonch peak and Yamunotri glacier ===
The source of Yamuna lies in the Yamunotri Glacier at an elevation of 6,387 metres (20,955 ft), on the southwestern slopes of Banderpooch peaks, which lie in the Mussoorie range of the Lower Himalayas, north of Haridwar in Uttarkashi district, Uttarakhand. It then flows from the mountainous cultural and geographical Mahasu region and then enters the Indo-Gangetic plains of Haryana and Uttar Pradesh. Yamunotri temple, a shrine dedicated to the goddess Yamuna, is one of the holiest shrines in Hinduism, and part of the Chota Char Dham Yatra circuit. Also standing close to the temple, on its 13-kilometre (8 mi) trek route that follows the right bank of the river, lies Markendeya Tirtha, where the sage Markandeya wrote the Markandeya Purana.

=== Current channel ===
The river flows southwards for about 200 kilometres (120 mi), through the Lower Himalayas and the Shivalik Hills Range. Morainic deposits are found along the steep Upper Yamuna, highlighted with geomorphic features such as interlocking spurs, steep rock benches, gorges and stream terraces. Large terraces formed over a long period of time can be seen in the lower course of the river, such as those near Naugoan. An important part of its early catchment area, totalling 2,320 square kilometres (900 mi^{2}), lies in Himachal Pradesh. The Tons, Yamuna's largest tributary, drains a large portion of the upper catchment area and holds more water than the main stream. It rises from the Hari-ki-dun valley and merges after Kalsi near Dehradun. The drainage system of the river stretches between Giri-Sutlej catchment in Himachal Pradesh and Yamuna-Bhilangna catchment in Uttarakhand, also draining the ridge of Shimla. Kalanag (6,387 metres [20,955 ft]) is the highest point of the Yamuna basin. Other tributaries in the region are the Giri, Rishi Ganga Kunta, Hanuman Ganga and Bata, which drain the upper catchment area of the Yamuna basin.

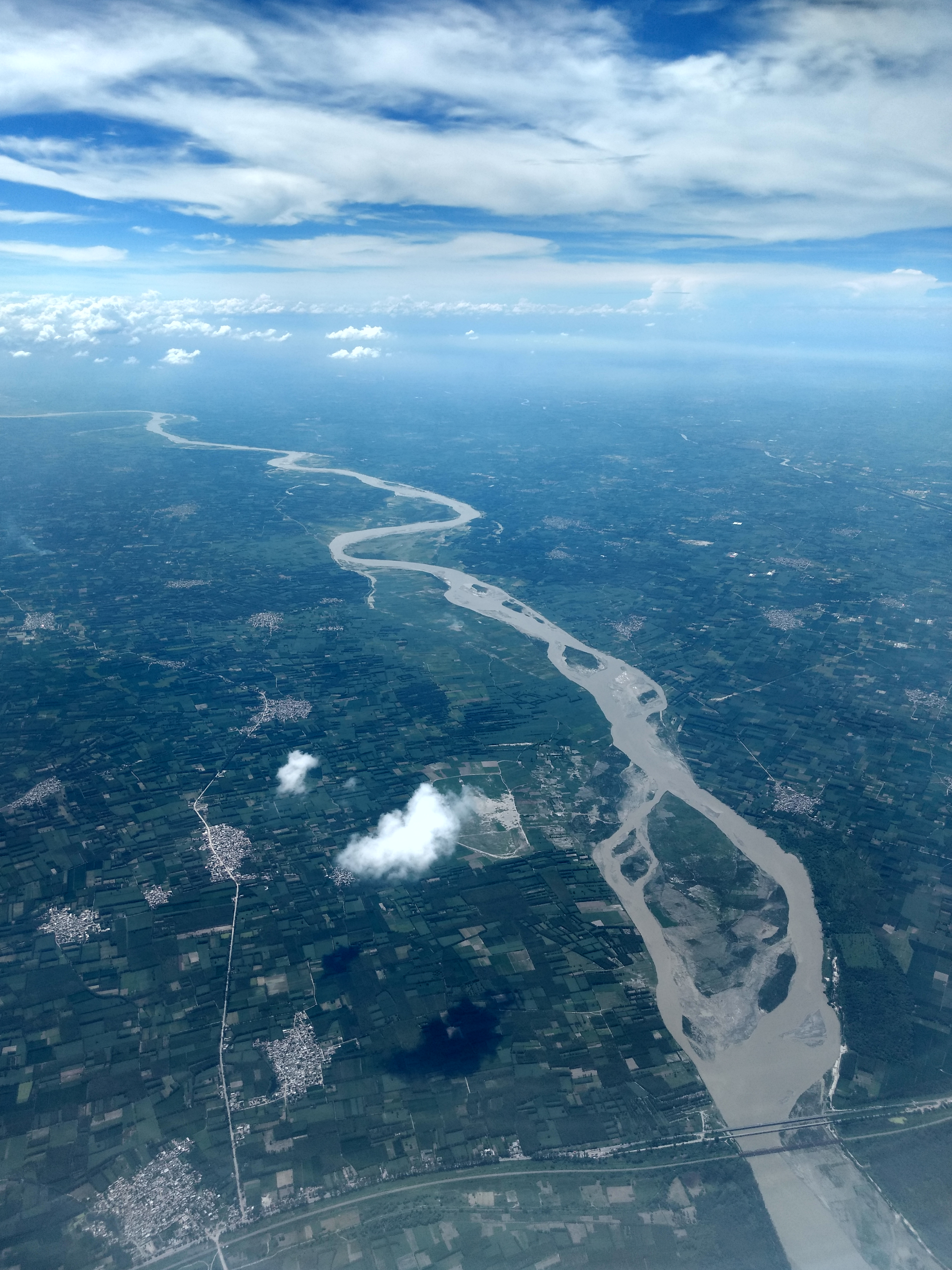
Yamuna river between Saharanpur and Yamunanagar

From the upper catchment area, the river descends onto the plains of Doon Valley, at Dak Pathar near Dehradun. Flowing through the Dakpathar Barrage, the water is diverted into a canal for power generation. Further downstream, the Assan River joins the Yamuna at the Asan Barrage, which hosts a bird sanctuary. After passing the Sikh pilgrimage town of Paonta Sahib, the Yamuna reaches Tajewala in Yamuna Nagar district (named after the river) of Haryana. A dam built here in 1873 is the origin of two important canals, the Western and Eastern Yamuna Canals, which irrigate the states of Haryana and Uttar Pradesh. The Western Yamuna Canal (WYC) crosses the Yamuna Nagar, Karnal, Panipat and Sonipat before reaching the Haiderpur treatment plant, which contributes to Delhi's municipal water supply. The Yamuna receives wastewater from the Yamuna Nagar and Panipat cities; beyond this it is replenished by seasonal streams and groundwater accrual. During the dry season, the Yamuna remains dry in many stretches between the Tajewala dam and Delhi, where it enters near the Palla barrage after traversing 224 kilometres (139 mi).

The Yamuna defines the state borders between Himachal Pradesh and Uttarakhand, and between Haryana, Delhi and Uttar Pradesh. When the Yamuna reaches the Indo-Gangetic plain, it runs almost parallel to the Ganges, the two rivers creating the Ganges-Yamuna Doab region. Spread across 69,000 square kilometres (27,000 mi^{2}), one-third of the alluvial plain, the region is known for its agricultural output, particularly for the cultivation of basmati rice. The plain's agriculture supports one-third of India's population.

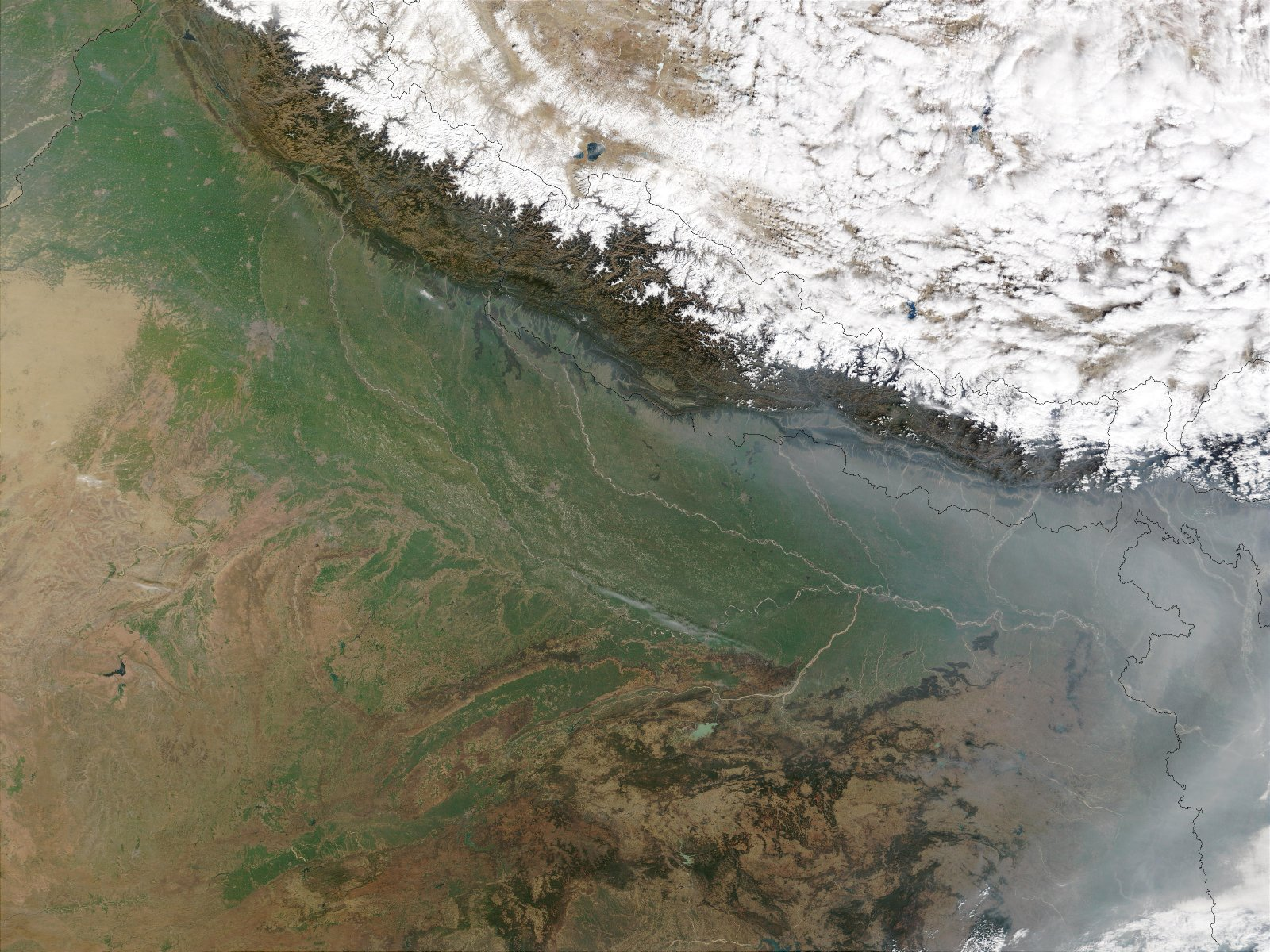
Course of Yamuna, in the Indo-Gangetic Plain

State	Catchment area (km^{2})	% of catchment area
Uttar Pradesh and Uttarakhand	74,208	21.5
Himachal Pradesh	5,799	1.6
Haryana	21,265	6.5
Rajasthan	102,883	29.8
Madhya Pradesh	140,230	40.6
Delhi	1,485	0.4

Subsequently, the Yamuna flows through the states of Delhi, Haryana and Uttar Pradesh before merging with the Ganges at a sacred spot known as Triveni Sangam in Prayagraj. Pilgrims travel by boats to platforms erected in midstream to offer prayers. During the Kumbh Mela, held every 12 years, large congregations of people immerse themselves in the sacred waters of the confluence. The cities of Baghpat, Delhi, Noida, Mathura, Agra, Firozabad, Etawah, Kalpi, Hamirpur, and Prayagraj lie on its banks. At Etawah, it meets it another important tributary, Chambal, followed by a host of tributaries further down, including, Sindh, the Betwa, and Ken.

=== Important tributaries ===
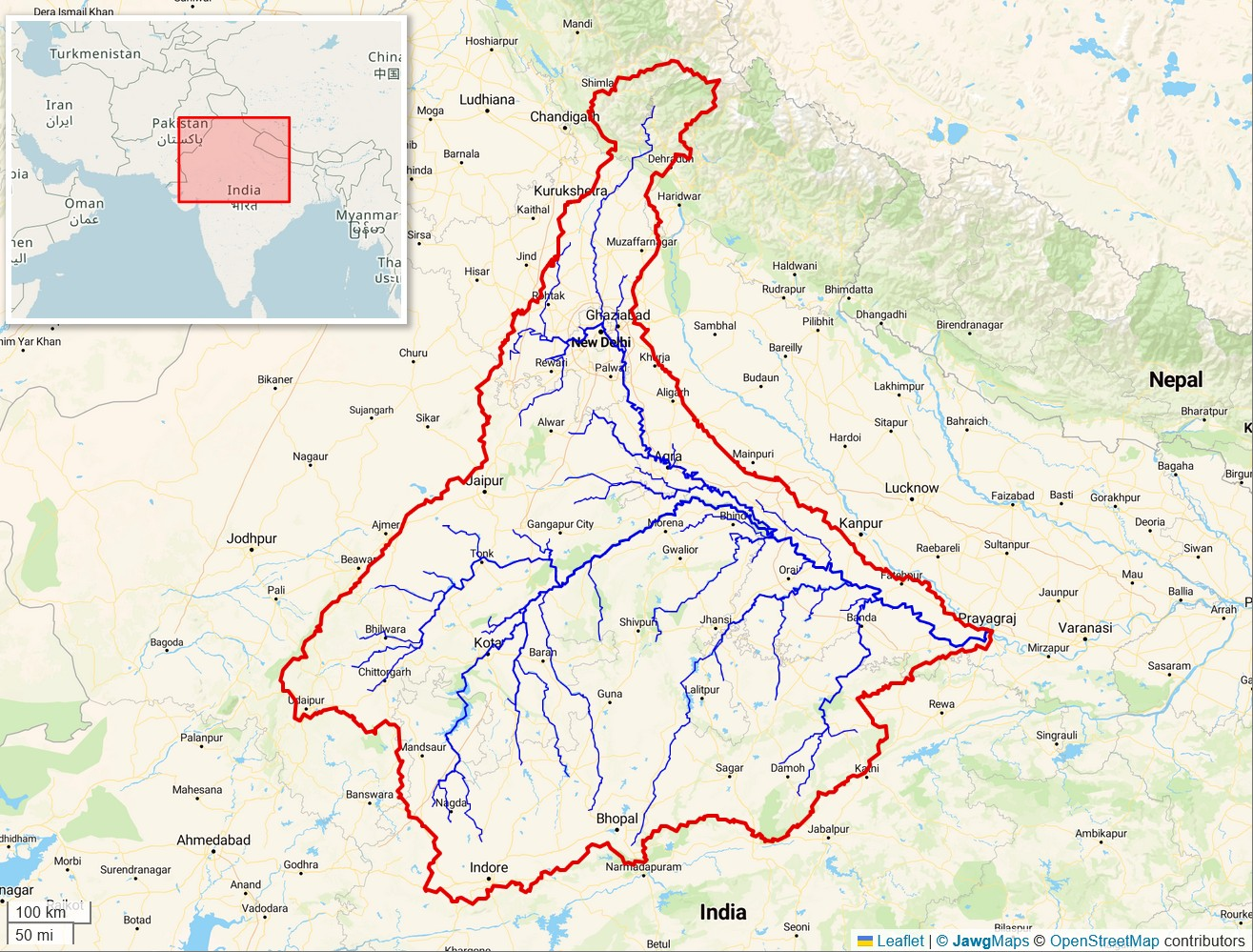
Yamuna River Basin (Interactive map)

The Yamuna's tributaries make up 70.9% of the catchment area and the river has six important tributaries:

- Tons River is the Yamuna's largest tributary and rises in the 6,315-metre-high (20,719 ft) Bandarpoonch mountain. It meets the Yamuna below Kalsi, near Dehradun, Uttarakhand.
- Hindon River originates from Upper Shivalik, in the Lower Himalayan Range. It is a rain fed river and has a catchment area of 7,083 square kilometres (2,735 mi^{2}) and traverses 400 kilometres (250 mi).
- Chambal River, also known as Charmanvati in ancient texts, flows through Rajasthan and Madhya Pradesh and traverses a total distance of 960 kilometres (600 mi) from its source in the Vindhya Range, near Mhow. It has a drainage basin of 143,219 square kilometres (55,297 mi^{2}) and it supports hydro-power generation at Gandhi Sagar dam, Rana Pratap Sagar dam and Jawahar Sagar dam. The Chambal river merges with the Yamuna at Sahon village.
- Kali River, rises in the Doon Valley and merges with the Hindon River.
- Ken River, flows through Madhya Pradesh and Uttar Pradesh. It originates near Ahirgawan village in Jabalpur district and travels a distance of 427 kilometres (265 mi) before merging with the Yamuna at Chilla village, near Fatehpur in Uttar Pradesh. It has an overall drainage basin of 28,058 square kilometres (10,833 mi^{2}).
- Betwa River originates in Bhopal district, in Madhya Pradesh. Its confluence with the Yamuna is in Hamirpur district, Uttar Pradesh. It has a catchment area of 46,580 km^{2} (17,980 sq mi).

== Background ==
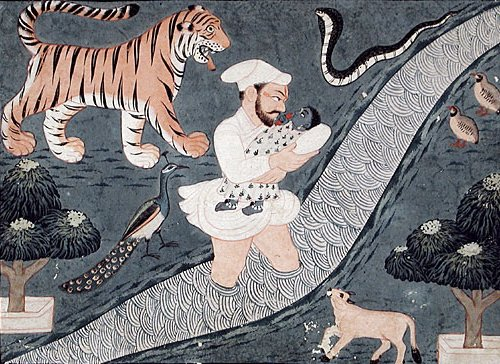
Vasudev carrying baby Lord Krishna across the Yamuna, an important legend of Bhagavata Purana, mid-18th century

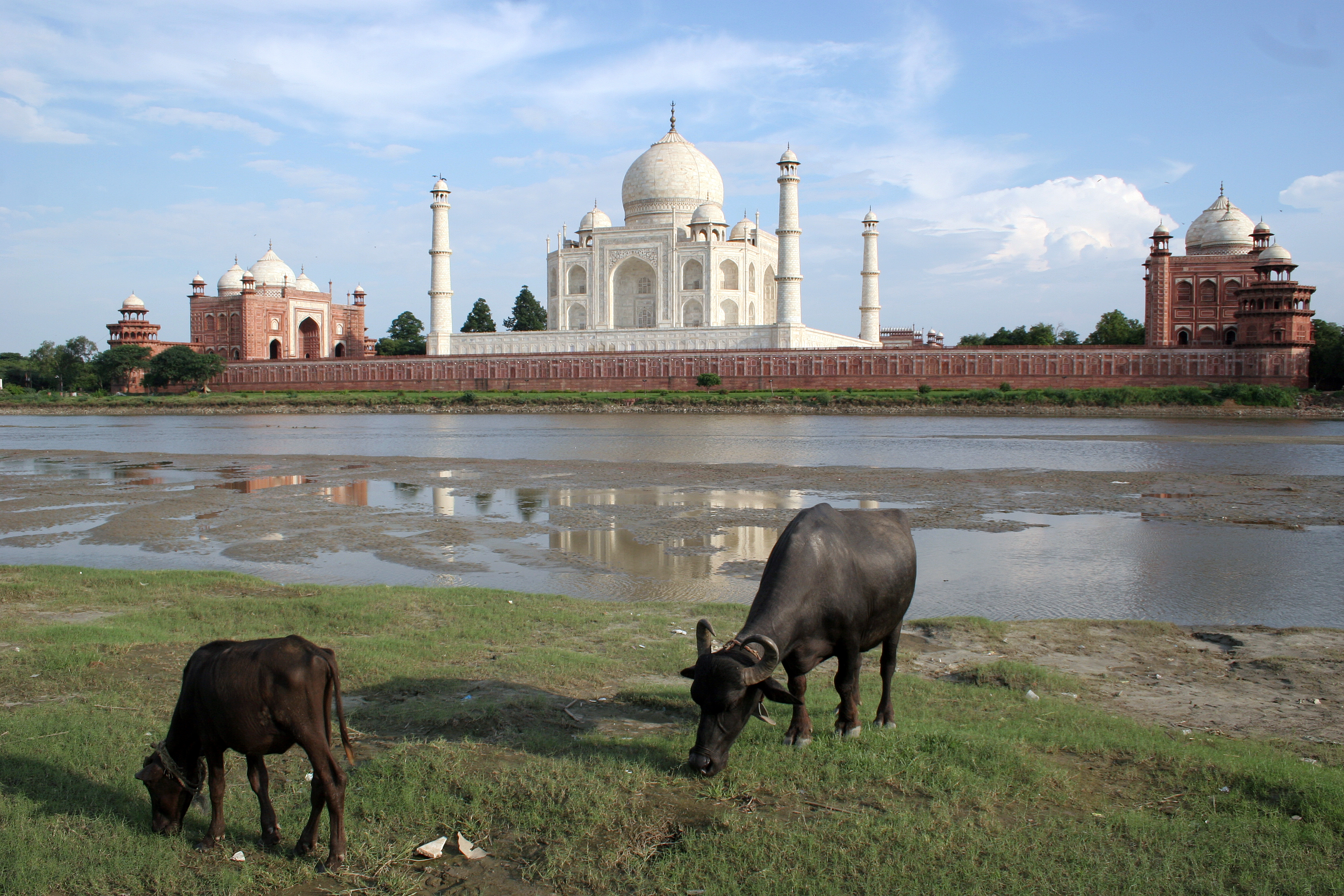
The Yamuna beside the Taj Mahal

=== Etymology ===
The name Yamuna seems to be derived from the Sanskrit word "yama", meaning 'twin', and it may have been applied to the river because it runs parallel to the Ganges, or because the Goddess Yamuna is believed to be the sister of Yama.

According to Hindu tradition, Yamkund Shikhar is associated with Yama, the god of death, and Yamuna, his twin sister. Tradition holds that Yama granted those who sincerely venerate Yamuna protection from untimely death. This belief has contributed to the enduring religious association between the siblings in Hindu mythology.

=== History ===
The earliest mention of the Yamuna is found at many places in the Rig Veda (c. 1500–1000 BCE), which was composed during the Vedic period c. 1700–1100 BCE, and also in the later Atharvaveda, and the Brahmanas including Aitareya Brahmana and Shatapatha Brahmana. In the Rigveda, the story of the Yamuna describes her "excessive love" for her twin, Yama, who in turn asks her to find a suitable match for herself, which she does in Krishna.

The Yamuna is mentioned as Iomanes (Ioames) in the surveys of Seleucus I Nicator, an officer of Alexander the Great and one of the Diadochi, who visited India in 305 BCE. Greek traveller and geographer Megasthenes visited India sometime before 288 BCE (the date of Chandragupta's death) and mentioned the river in his Indica, where he described the region around it as the land of Surasena. In Mahabharata, the Pandava capital of Indraprastha was situated on the banks of the Yamuna, considered to be the site of modern Delhi.

Geological evidence indicates that in the distant past the Yamuna was a tributary of the Ghaggar River (identified by some as the Vedic Sarasvati River). It later changed its course eastward, becoming a tributary of the Ganges. While some have argued that this was due to a tectonic event, and may have led to the Sarasvati River drying up, the end of many Harappan civilisation settlements, and creation of the Thar Desert, recent geological research suggests that the diversion of the Yamuna to the Ganges may have occurred during the Pleistocene, and thus could not be connected to the decline of the Harappan civilisation in the region.

Most of the great empires which ruled over a majority of India were based in the highly fertile Ganges–Yamuna basin, including the Magadha (c. 600 BCE), Maurya Empire (321–185 BCE), Shunga Empire (185–73 BCE), Kushan Empire (1st–3rd centuries CE), and Gupta Empire (280–550 CE), and many had their capitals here, in cities like Pataliputra or Mathura. These rivers were revered throughout these kingdoms that flourished on their banks; since the period of Chandragupta II (r. 375–415 CE), statues both the Ganges and the Yamuna became common throughout the Gupta Empire. Further to the South, images of the Ganges and the Yamuna are found amidst shrines of the Chalukyas, Rashtrakutas (753–982), and on their royal seals; prior to them, the Chola Empire also added the river into their architectural motifs. The Three River Goddess shrine, next to the Kailash rock-cut Temple at Ellora, shows the Ganges flanked by the Yamuna and Saraswati.

== Use of water ==
=== 1994 water sharing agreement ===
The stretch of the river from its origin at Yamunotri to Okhla barrage in Delhi is called "Upper Yamuna". A Memorandum of Understanding (MoU) was signed amongst the five basin states (Himachal Pradesh, Uttar Pradesh, Uttarakhand, Haryana, Rajasthan, and Delhi) on 12 May 1994 for sharing of its waters. This led to the formation of the Upper Yamuna River Board under India's Ministry of Water Resources, whose primary functions are: regulation of the available flows amongst the beneficiary states and monitoring the return flows; monitoring conservation and upgrading the quality of surface and groundwater; maintaining hydro-meteorological data for the basin; overviewing plans for watershed management; and monitoring and reviewing the progress of all projects up to and including Okhla barrage.

Flood forecasting systems are established at Poanta Sahib, where Tons, Pawar and Giri tributaries meet. The river take 60 hours to travel from Tajewala to Delhi, thus allowing a two-day advance flood warning period. The Central Water Commission started flood-forecasting services in 1958 with its first forecasting station on Yamuna at Delhi Railway Bridge.

=== Barrages ===
The Yamuna has the following dams and barrages (eight including old replaced barrages, nine including a new proposed barrage), from north-west to southeast:

- Under-construction
  - Lakhwar dam Hydroelectric Power Project, includes under-construction Lakhwar Dam and Power Station, Vyasi Dam, Hathiari Power Station and Katapathar Barrage, near the Lakhwar town Dehradun district of Uttarakhand for the purpose of irrigation of 40,000 hectare land and total 927 MW hydroelectric power generation.
    - Vyasi Dam, 5 km downstream along with 120 MW "Hathiari Power Station" further 0.5 km downstream.
    - Katapathar Barrage, further 2.75 km downstream to supply the water to stakeholder states.
  - Kishau Dam, under-construction on Tons river tributary of the Yamuna with 2028 expected completion.
  - Reuka Ji Dam Hydroelectricity Power Project, 40 MW, INR 6,947 crore project of which 90% is funded by the Central Government, is an under-construction 148-metre-high gravity dam with 24 km lake holding 498 million cubic metres of water. It was expedited The 148-metre-high dam will create a reservoir spanning 24 km and store 498 million cubic metres of water. Haryana, Himachal Pradesh, Uttar Pradesh, Uttarakhand, Rajasthan, and Delhi are the stakeholder states. After much delays, it was expedited in 2021 by Prime Minister Narendra Modi with expected completion date of 2030.
- Existing
  - Dakpathar Barrage in Uttarakhand, managed by the Uttarakhand government.
  - Hathni Kund Barrage in Haryana, 172 km (107 mi) from the source of the Yamuna, built in 1999 and managed by Haryana government.
    - Tajewala Barrage was built in 1873 and replaced by the Hathni Kund.
  - Wazirabad barrage in north Delhi, 244 km (152 mi) from Hathni Kund barrage, managed by the Delhi government.
    - "New Wazirabad barrage", proposed in 2013, to be built 8 km (5.0 mi) north of the Wazirabad barrage.
  - ITO barrage (Indraparstha barrage) in central Delhi, managed by the Haryana govt.
  - Okhla barrage is 22 km (14 mi) from Wazirabad to south Delhi, managed by the Uttar Pradesh (UP) government.
    - New Okhla Barrage, a new barrage, managed by the UP government.
    - Palla barrage downstream on "Delhi-Faridabad canal" in Haryana, managed by the Haryana government.
  - Gokul barrage (a.k.a. Mathura barrage) is at Gokul in Uttar Pradesh, managed by the UP government.

=== Irrigation ===
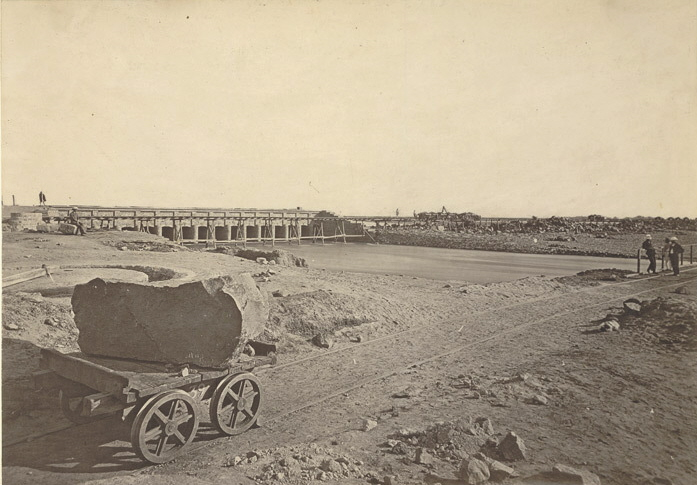
Agra Canal headworks at Okhla barrage, Delhi, 1871

Use of the Yamuna's waters for irrigation in the Indo-Gangetic Plains is enhanced by its many canals, some dating to the 14th century Tughlaq dynasty, which built the Nahr-i-Bahisht (Paradise) parallel to the river. The Nahr-i-Bahisht was restored and extended by the Mughals in the first half of the 17th century, by engineer Ali Mardan Khan, starting from Benawas where the river enters the plains and terminating near the Mughal capital of Shahjahanabad, the present city of Delhi.

==== Eastern Yamuna Canal ====
As the Yamuna enters the Northern Plains near Dakpathar at an elevation of 790 metres (2,590 ft), the Eastern Yamuna Canal commences at the Dakpathar Barrage and pauses at the Asan and Hathnikund Barrages before continuing south.

==== Western Yamuna Canal ====
The Western Yamuna Canal (WYC) was built in 1335 CE by Firuz Shah Tughlaq. Excessive silting caused it to stop flowing c. 1750, when the British Raj undertook a three-year renovation in 1817 by Bengal Engineer Group. The Tajewala Barrage dam was built in 1832–33 to regulate the flow of water, and was replaced by the modern Hathni Kund Barrage in 1999.

The main canal is 86 kilometres (53 mi) long. When including its branches and many major and minor irrigation channels, it has a total length of 325 km (202 mi) The WYC begins at the Hathni Kund Barrage about 38 km (24 mi) from Dakpathar and south of Doon Valley. The canals irrigate vast tracts of land in the region in Ambala, Karnal, Sonipat, Rohtak, Jind, Hisar and Bhiwani districts.

The major branch canals are:

- Agra Canal, built in 1874, which starts from the Okhla barrage beyond the Nizamuddin bridge, joining the Banganga river about 32 kilometres (20 mi) below Agra. During the dry summer season, the stretch above Agra resembles a minor stream.
- Munak canal, built in 1819 and renovated in 2008, originates at Munak in Karnal district and extends 22 km to Delhi, carrying 20 m^{3}/s (700 cu ft/s) of water.
  - Delhi Branch
    - Bhalaut Branch, originating at Khubru village, flows through Jhajjar district.
      - Jhajjar Branch, flows through Jhajjar district.
- Sirsa Branch, the largest branch of the WYC, constructed in 1889–1895. It originates at Indri and meanders through Jind district, Fatehabad district and Sirsa district.
  - Jind Branch
    - Bhiwani Branch, which meanders through Bhiwani district and passes Bidhwan.
  - Barwala Branch
- Hansi Branch, built in 1825 and remodelled in 1959. It originates at Munak and meanders through Hansi tehsil of Hisar district.
  - Butana Branch
    - Sunder Branch, which passes Kanwari in Hisar district.
- Rohtak Branch

=== Sutlej–Yamuna Link Canal ===
A proposed heavy freight canal, the Sutlej–Yamuna Link (SYL), is being built westwards from near the Yamuna's headwaters through the Punjab region near an ancient caravan route and highlands pass to the navigable parts of the Sutlej–Indus watershed. This will connect the Ganges, which flows to the east coast of the subcontinent, with points west (via Pakistan). When completed, the SYL will allow shipping from India's east coast to the west coast and the Arabian Sea, shortening important commercial links for north-central India's large population. The canal starts near Delhi, and is designed to transfer Haryana's share of 4.3 km^{3} (3,500,000 acre⋅ft) from the Indus Basin.

=== National Waterway ===
The Yamuna is one of the National Waterways of India, designated as NW110 in Haryana, Delhi and Uttar Pradesh. Some of its sections are being developed for navigation:

- Delhi–Faridabad (Wazirabad barrage to Palla barrage, via ITO barrage), is being developed for passenger and cargo ferry service.
- Delhi–Agra (Okhla barrage to Agra Canal), is planned for steamer service by the end of June 2017 with the help of the Netherlands.

== Religious significance ==
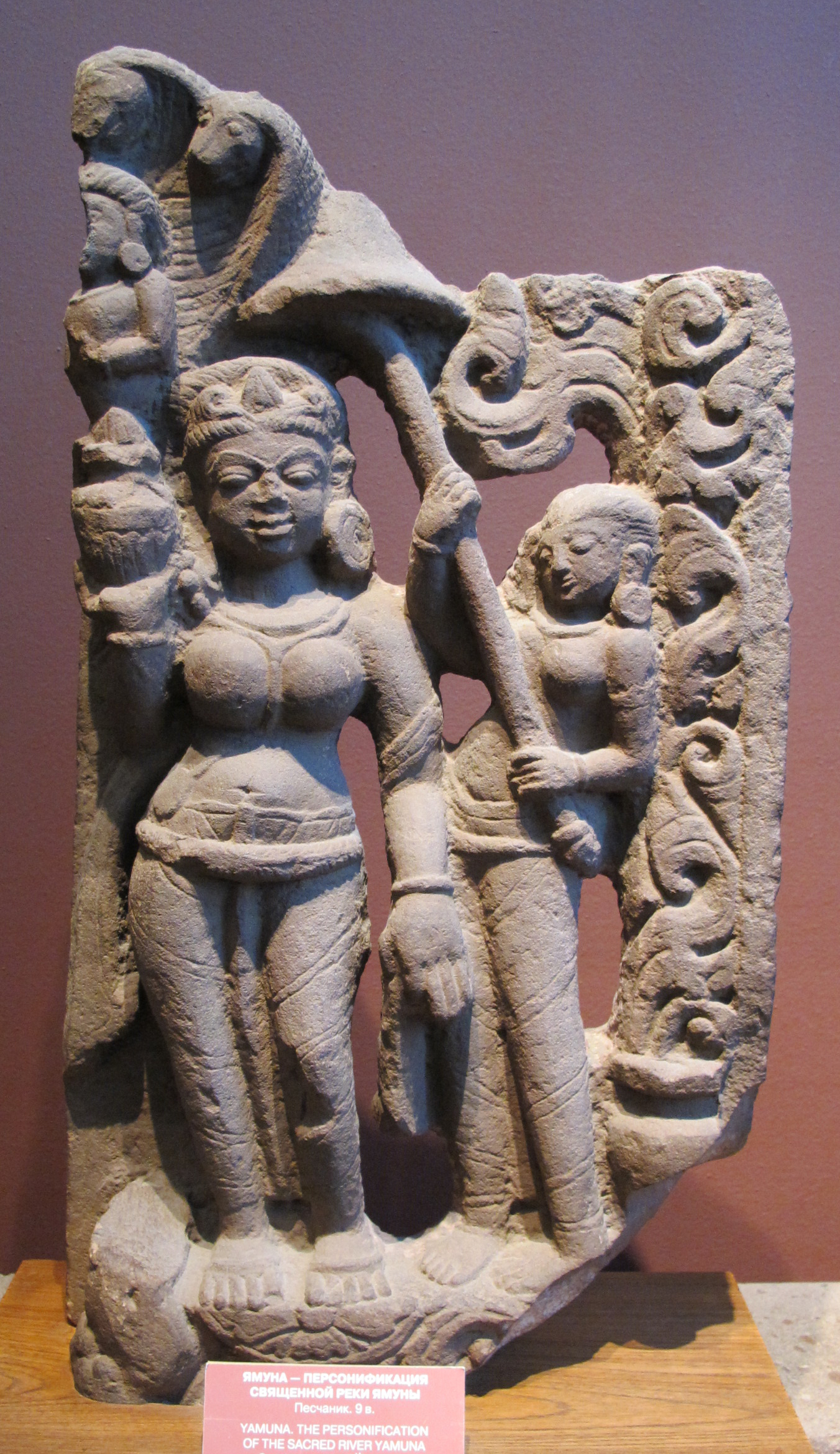
The goddess Yamuna

=== Purifying waters ===
Like the Ganges, the Yamuna River is highly venerated in Hinduism in the form of a river and as the goddess Yamuna. The Yamuna is considered a river of heaven. The Rig Veda includes the Yamuna River as one of the seven sacred rivers, along with the Ganges. According to Hindu mythology, the River was brought to Earth by the ascetic practice of the Seven Sages where she first descended on Mount Kalinda. Therefore, Yamuna is also known as Kalindi.

The Padma Purana describes Yamuna's purifying properties and states that her waters cleanse the mind from sin. It also mentions that bathing in her sacred waters frees one from the torments of death. Art from the Gupta period depict Yamuna and Ganga on the entrances and doorjambs of temples and sacred places. Upon passing through these doors, visitors were symbolically purified by these rivers.

Some religious figures (notably pilgrim priests of Mathura and Vrindavan) do not regard the physical pollution of the Yamuna to have any effect on the river's spiritual purity. The Braj region is where the worship of the Yamuna and its pollution is most pronounced. However, more and more Hindus no longer ritually bathe in the Yamuna, drink its water, or use its water for worship. In Vrindavan's holy shrines, bottled water is used instead.

=== Goddess personified ===
In her human form, the Yamuna is the daughter of Surya, the sun god, and his wife Saranyu. She is the twin sister of Yama, the god of death, and is also known as Yami. The Agni Purana describes the Yamuna as having a dark complexion, mounted on a turtle, and holding a pot in her hand.

=== Devotion ===
The Yamuna, as a river and goddess, has a close association with Krishna. The Puranas narrate many stories about Krishna in relation to the river and its surroundings. One such story is of Kaliya Daman, the subduing of Kaliya, a Nāga that had inhabited the river and terrorised the people of Braja. Due to Krishna's connection with the river and the Braja region, the Yamuna River is a center of pilgrimage for his devotees. In the Pushti Marga, founded by Vallabhacharya and in which Krishna is the main deity, the Yamuna is worshipped as a goddess.

The Yamunashtakam is a 16th-century Sanskrit hymn composed by Vallabhacharya that describes the story of the Yamuna's descent to meet her beloved Krishna and to purify the world. The hymn also praises her for being the source of all spiritual abilities. While the Ganges is considered an epitome of asceticism and higher knowledge and can grant moksha or liberation, it is the Yamuna, as the embodiment of infinite love and compassion, can grant freedom even from death, the realm of her elder brother. Vallabhacharya writes that she rushes down Kalinda Mountain and describes her as the daughter of Kalinda, giving her the name Kalindi, the backdrop of Krishna Leela. The text states that her water is the same dark (Shyam) colour as Krishna. The river is referred to as Asita in some historical texts.

==== Shlokas on the Yamuna ====
Numerous Hindu texts have shlokas (hymns) on Yamuna as follows:

- "One should not give up the process of austerity. If possible, one should bathe in the water of the Yamuna. This is an item of austerity. Therefore, our Krishna consciousness movement has established a center in Vrindavana so that one may bathe in the Yamuna, chant the Hare Krishna mantra and then become perfect and return back to Godhead." (Srimad Bhagavatam 6.5.28 purport)

== Ecology ==
=== Fauna ===
The Yamuna, from the source to its culmination in the Ganges, is a habitat for fish for an approximately 1,400 km (870 mi) stretch and supports a rich diversity of species. Fish from the family Cyprinidae dominate the variety of fish species found in the river. This includes Indian carp and also invasive species from the family. In a study, 93 species of fish were found in the river including catfish. Species of non-native Tilapia have become established in the river. They have been implicated in the decline of the Ghariyal (Indian crocodile) population in the river. Large turtles used to be a common sight on the river a few decades ago but they have mostly disappeared.

The natural vegetation along the Yamuna changes from Riverine Grasslands in its Upper course in cities like Delhi to Moist Deciduous Forest along the lower course towards Prayagraj, although a lot of the area has been cleared for agriculture and cities

== Pollution ==
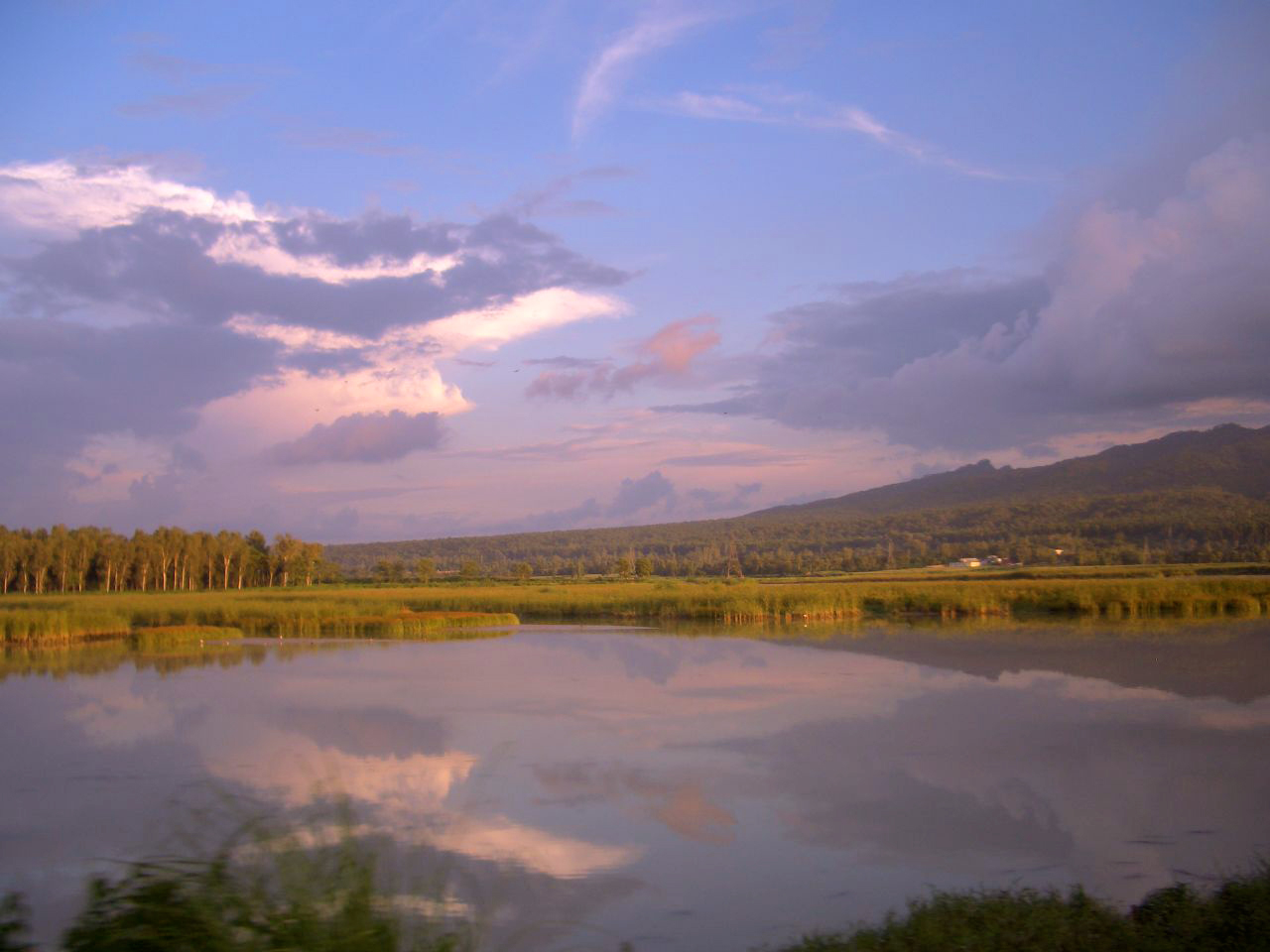
The Yamuna near the Himalayas, just as it reaches the plains, beyond Dehradun in Uttarakhand

In 1909, the waters of the Yamuna were distinguishable as clear blue, when compared to the silt-laden yellow of the Ganges. However, due to high-density population growth and fast industrialisation, the Yamuna has become one of the most polluted rivers in the world. The Yamuna is particularly polluted downstream of New Delhi, the capital of India, which dumps about 58% of its waste into the river. A 2016 study shows that there is 100% urban metabolism of the River Yamuna as it passes through the National Capital Territory (NCT) of Delhi. The most pollution comes from Wazirabad, from where the Yamuna enters Delhi.

In November 2024, a video went viral in which women were depicted bathing in foam that had emerged in the river. Although it appeared similar to that resulting from cosmetic products such as soap or shampoo, experts determined that the foam was caused by heavy pollution, and was therefore hazardous. Local authorities instructed residents not to bathe in the river for health concerns.

=== Causes ===
The Wazirabad barrage to the New Okhla Barrage segment, "22 km stretch of the Yamuna in Delhi, is less than 2% of the Yamuna's total length but accounts for nearly 80% of the total pollution in the river", 22 out of 35 sewage treatment plants in Delhi do not meet the wastewater standards prescribed by the Delhi Pollution Control Committee (DPCC), thus untreated wastewater and poor quality of water discharged from the wastewater treatment plants are the major reasons. As of 2019, the river receives 800 million litres of largely untreated sewage and additional 44 million litres of industrial effluents each day, of which only 35 percent of the sewage released into the river are believed to be treated. In 1994, the states of Himachal Pradesh, Uttar Pradesh, Haryana, Rajasthan and Delhi made a water sharing agreement that is due for revision in 2025. To achieve a water quality suitable for bathing (BOD<3 mg/L and DO>5 mg/L) would require a greater rate of water flow in the river. A study has recommended that 23 cubic metres (23,000 L; 5,100 imp gal) per second of water should be released from Hathni Kund Barrage during the lean season to provide a minimum environmental flow in the Yamuna.

The last barrage across the Yamuna river is the Mathura barrage at Gokul to supply its drinking water. Downstream of this barrage, many pumping stations are constructed to feed the river water for irrigation needs. These pumping stations are near Pateora Danda 25°55′09″N 80°13′27″E, Samgara 25°41′13″N 80°46′27″E, Ainjhi 25°43′35″N 80°49′33″E, Bilas Khadar 25°31′35″N 81°02′43″E, and Samari 25°27′19″N 81°11′43″E. Depletion of the base flows available in the river during the non-monsoon months by these pump houses is exacerbating river pollution from Mathura to Prayagraj in the absence of adequate fresh water to dilute the polluted drainage from habitations and industries.

=== Cleanup efforts ===
To address river pollution, measures have been taken by the Ministry of Environment and Forests (MoEF) in 12 towns of Haryana, 8 towns of Uttar Pradesh, and Delhi, under the Yamuna Action Plan (YAP) which has been implemented since 1993 by the MoEF's National River Conservation Directorate (NRCD). The Japan Bank for International Cooperation is participating in the YAP in 15 of the towns (excluding 6 towns of Haryana included later on the direction of the Supreme Court of India) with soft loan assistance of 17.773 billion Japanese yen (equivalent to about ₹700 crore [7 billion rupees]) while the government of India is providing the funds for the remaining 6 towns. In 2007, the Indian government's plans to repair sewage lines were predicted to improve the water quality of the river 90% by 2010.

Under the YAP- III scheme, a new sewage treatment plant is being built at the largest such facility in India by the Delhi Jal Board (DJB). The plant is predicted to be able to treat 124 million gallons of wastewater per day, amounting to a daily removal of 41,200 kg (90,800 lb) of organic pollutants as well as 61,600 kg (135,800 lb) of solids.

In August 2009, the Delhi Jal Board (DJB) initiated its plan for resuscitating the Yamuna's 22-kilometre (14 mi) stretch in Delhi by constructing interceptor sewers, at the cost of about ₹1,800 crore (18 billion rupees).

On 25 April 2014, the National Green Tribunal Act (NGA) recommended the government to declare a 52-kilometre (32 mi) stretch of the Yamuna in Delhi and Uttar Pradesh as a conservation zone. A report prepared by the Ministry of Environment and Forests (MoEF) panel was submitted to the NGA on the same day.

The High Court in the northern Indian state of Uttarakhand ordered in March 2017 that the Ganges and its main tributary, the Yamuna, be assigned the status of legal entities, making the rivers "legal and living entities having the status of a legal person with all corresponding rights, duties and liabilities". This decision meant that polluting or damaging the rivers is equivalent to harming a person. The court cited the example of the New Zealand Whanganui River, which was also declared to possess full rights of a legal person.

In February 2025, after the Bharatiya Janata Party won the 2025 Delhi Legislative Assembly elections, the Ministry of Jal Shakti introduced the 'Yamuna Master Plan,' aimed at cleaning the river along the Delhi section. The plan outlines several steps to reduce pollution and restore the water quality of the river. Additionally, the BJP government in Delhi has set a 2027 deadline for the completion of the cleaning process, with a four-stage strategy focused on removing waste, silt, and cleaning major drains. As part of its plan to improve the river's surrounding environment, the government is also working to promote tourism, including a proposed river cruise service between Sonia Vihar and Jagatpur in Delhi.

== Gallery ==
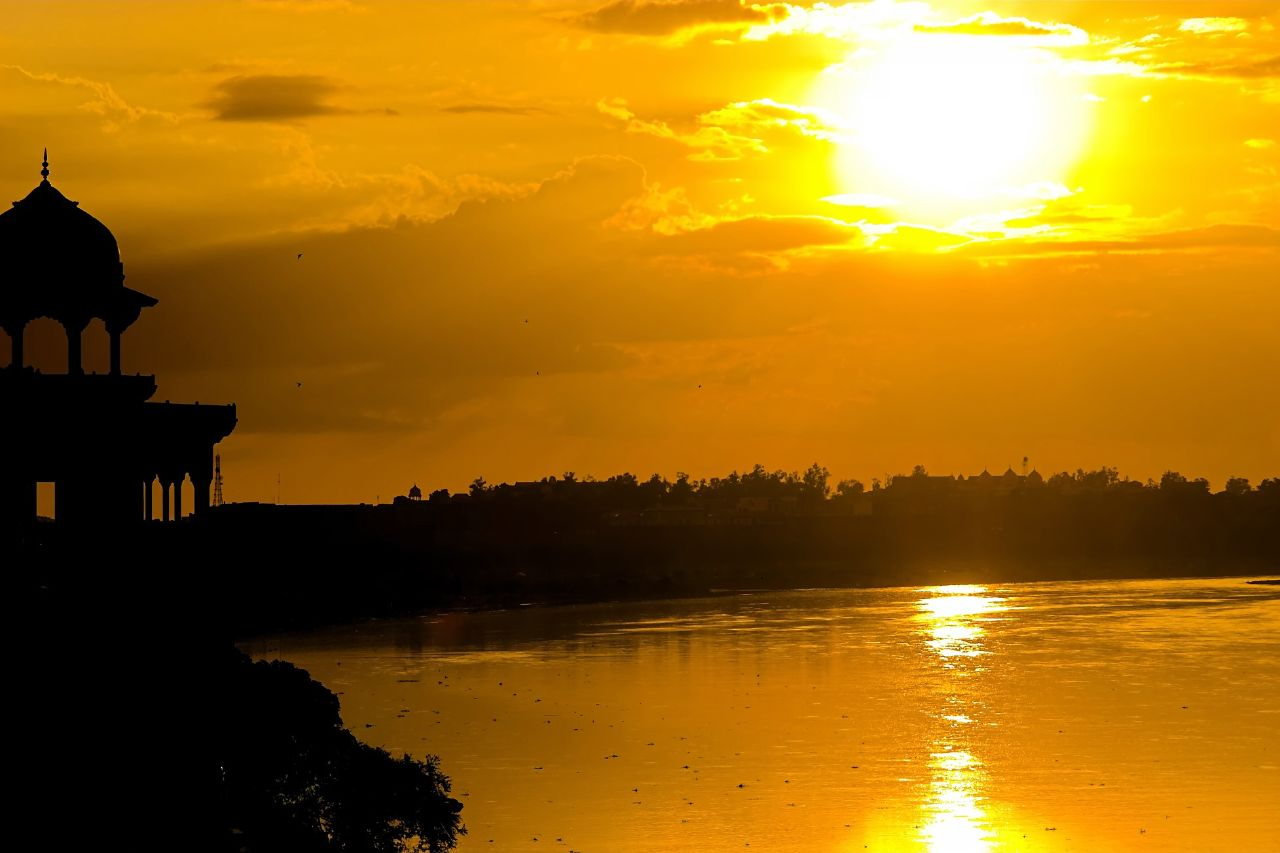
The Yamuna, seen from the Taj Mahal at Agra in Uttar Pradesh

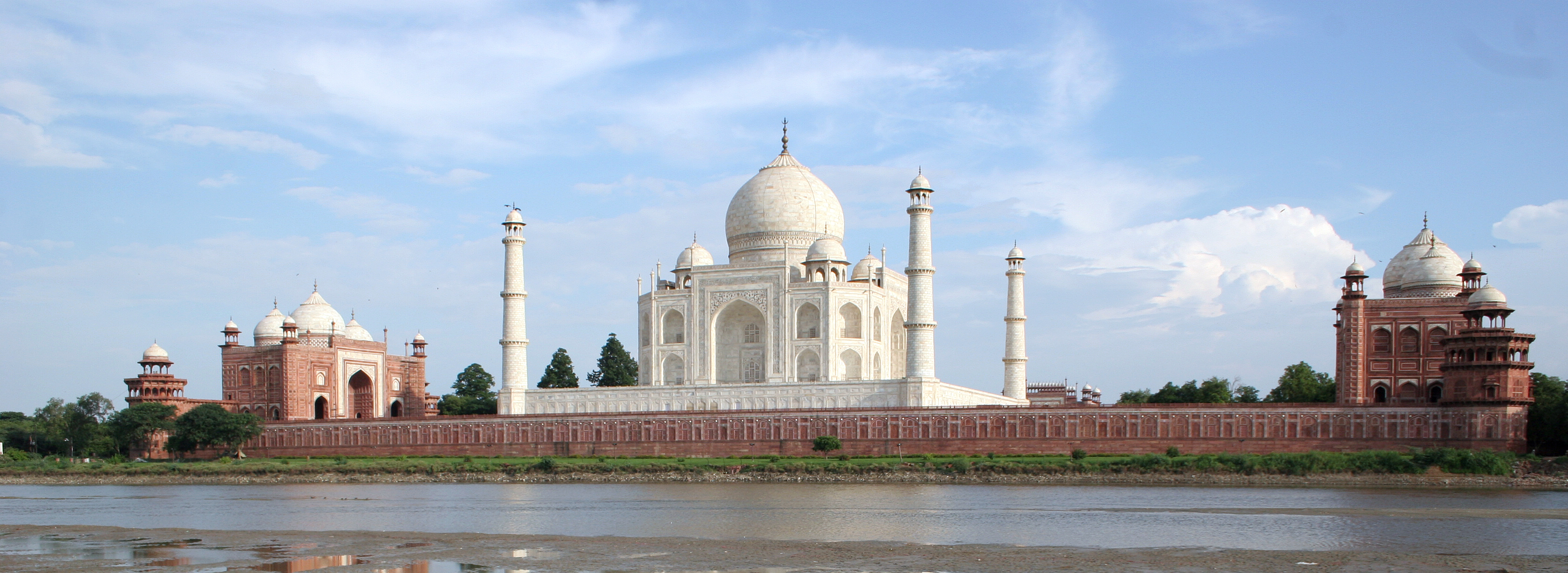
The Taj Mahal complex alongside the river

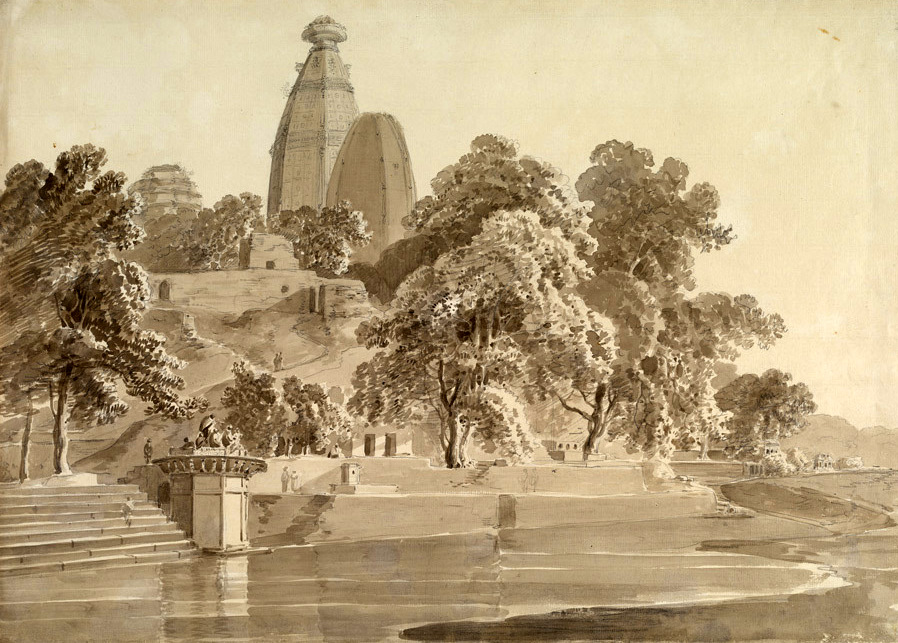
Madan Mohan temple, on the Yamuna at Vrindavan in Uttar Pradesh, 1789; the river has since shifted further away

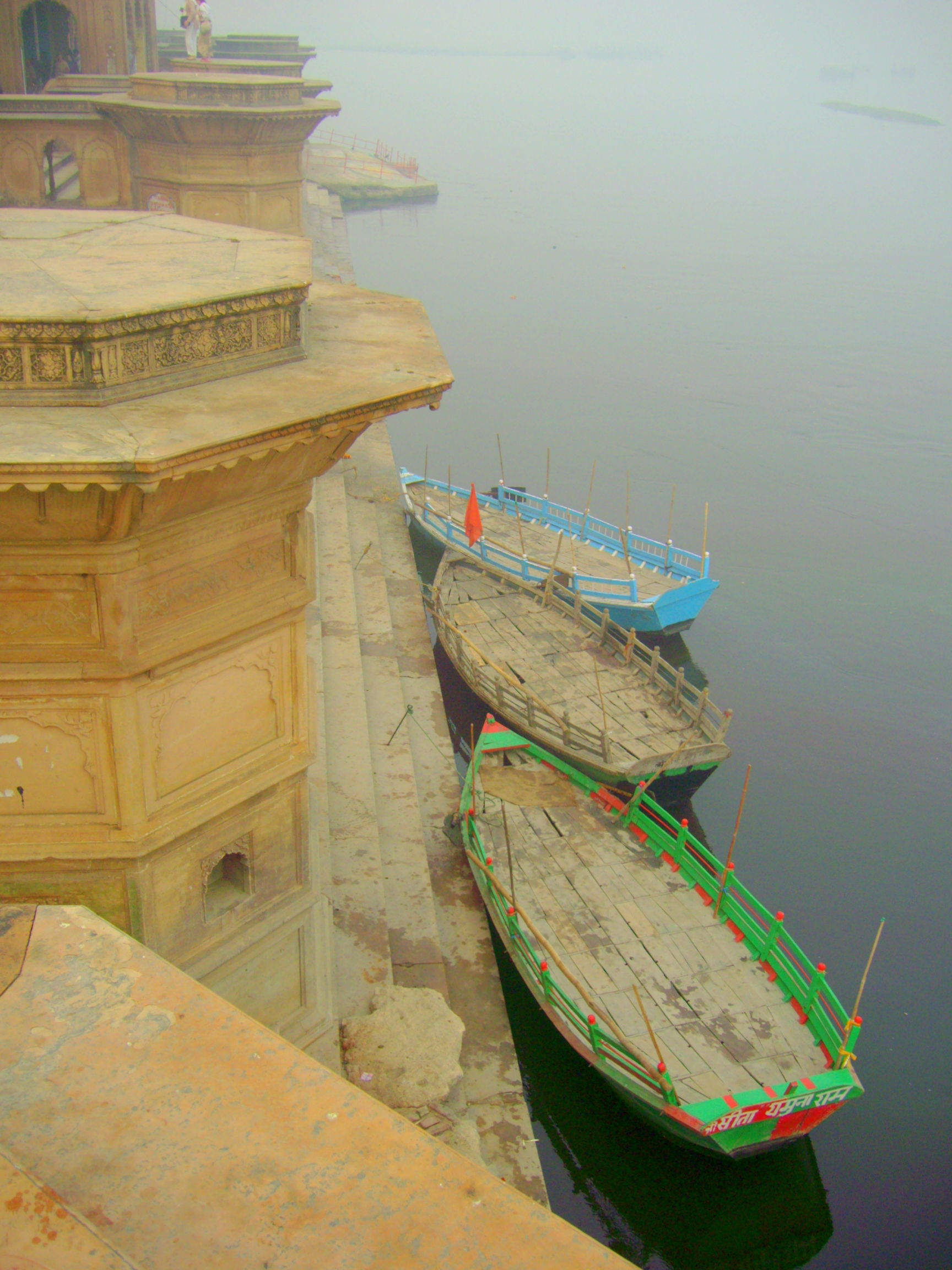
'Keshi Ghat' on the Yamuna at Vrindavan in Uttar Pradesh

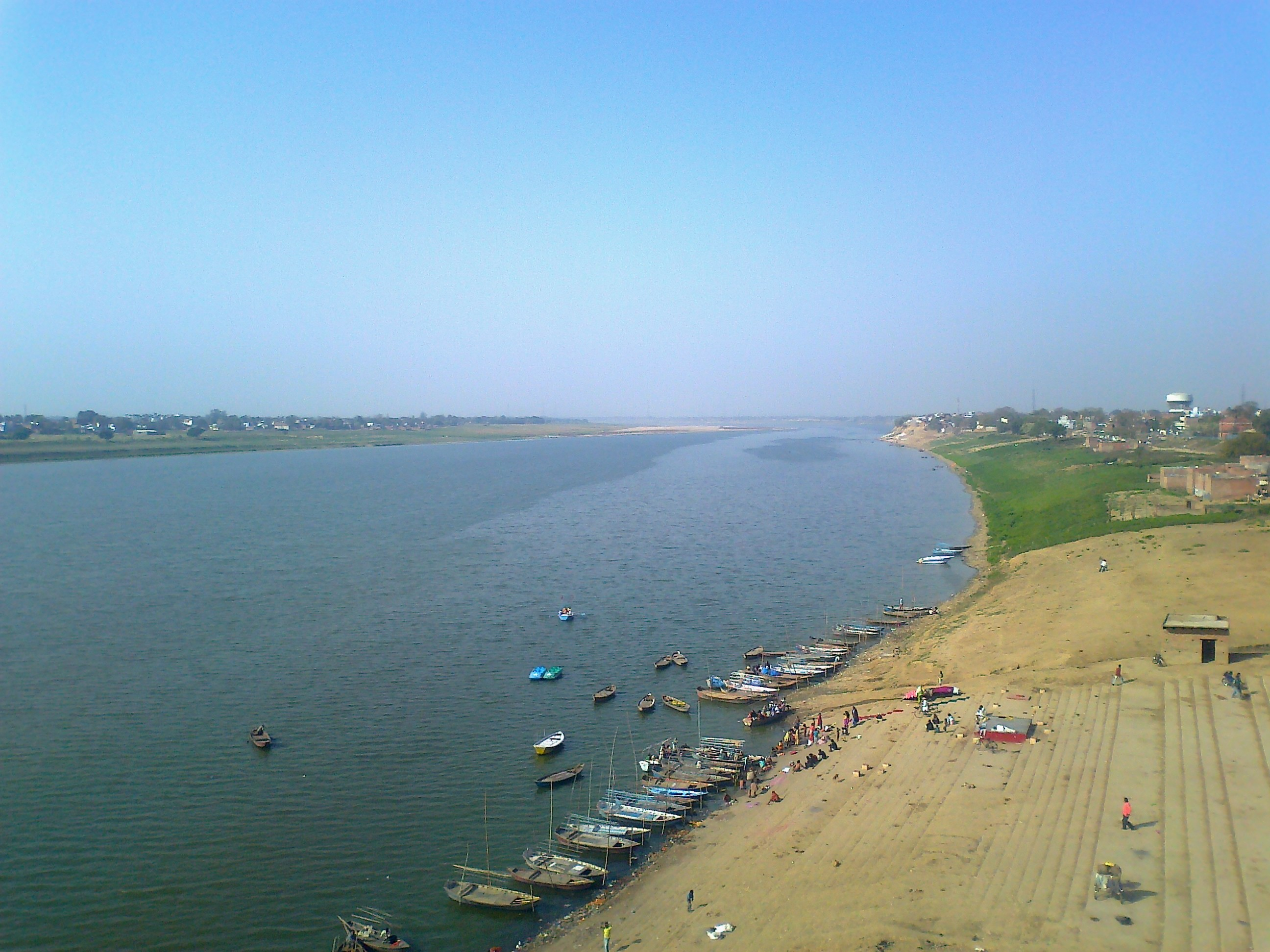
The Yamuna near Prayagraj in Uttar Pradesh, just a few kilometres before it meets the Ganges

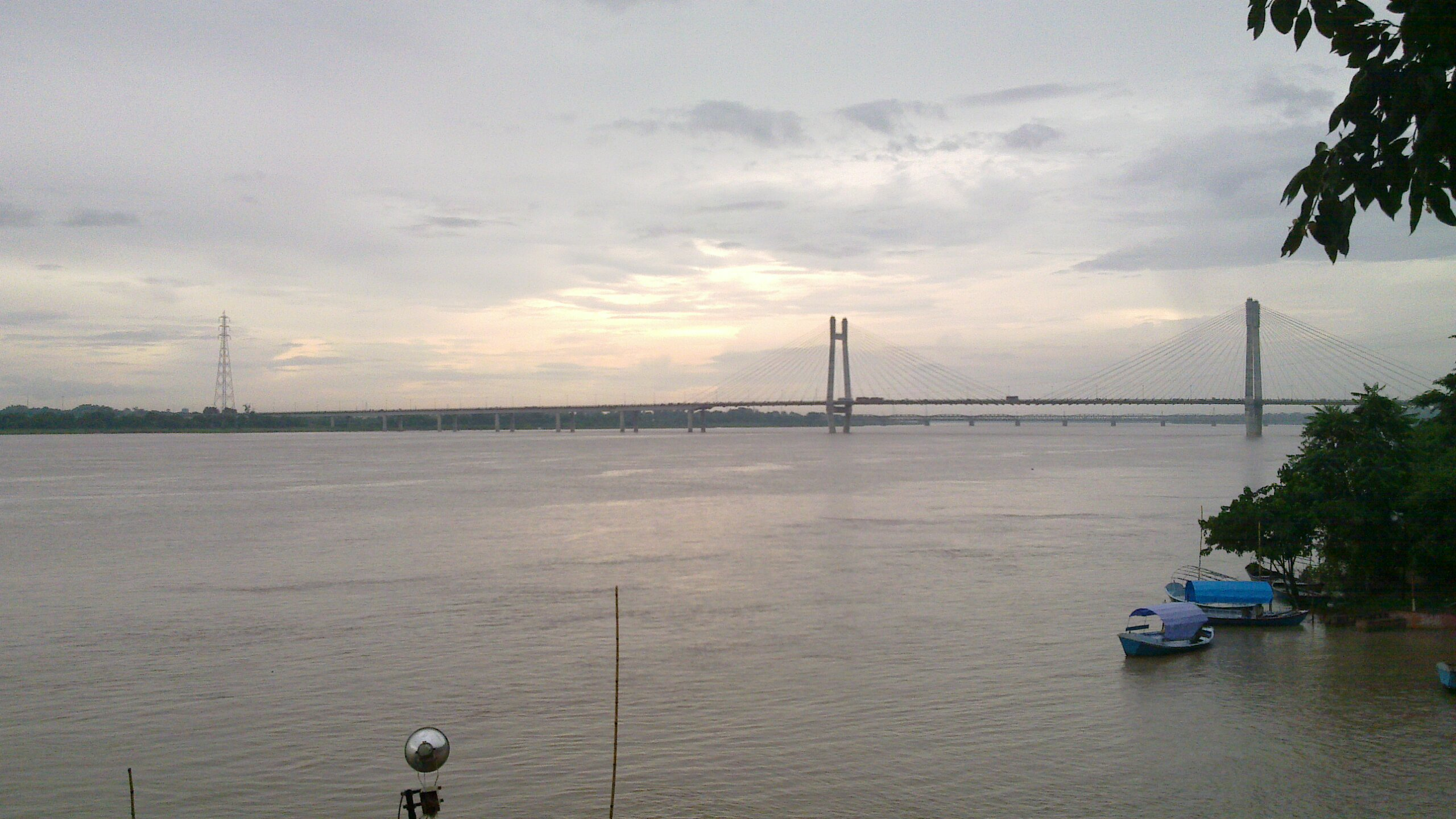
The Yamuna near Prayagraj in Uttar Pradesh, during the monsoon

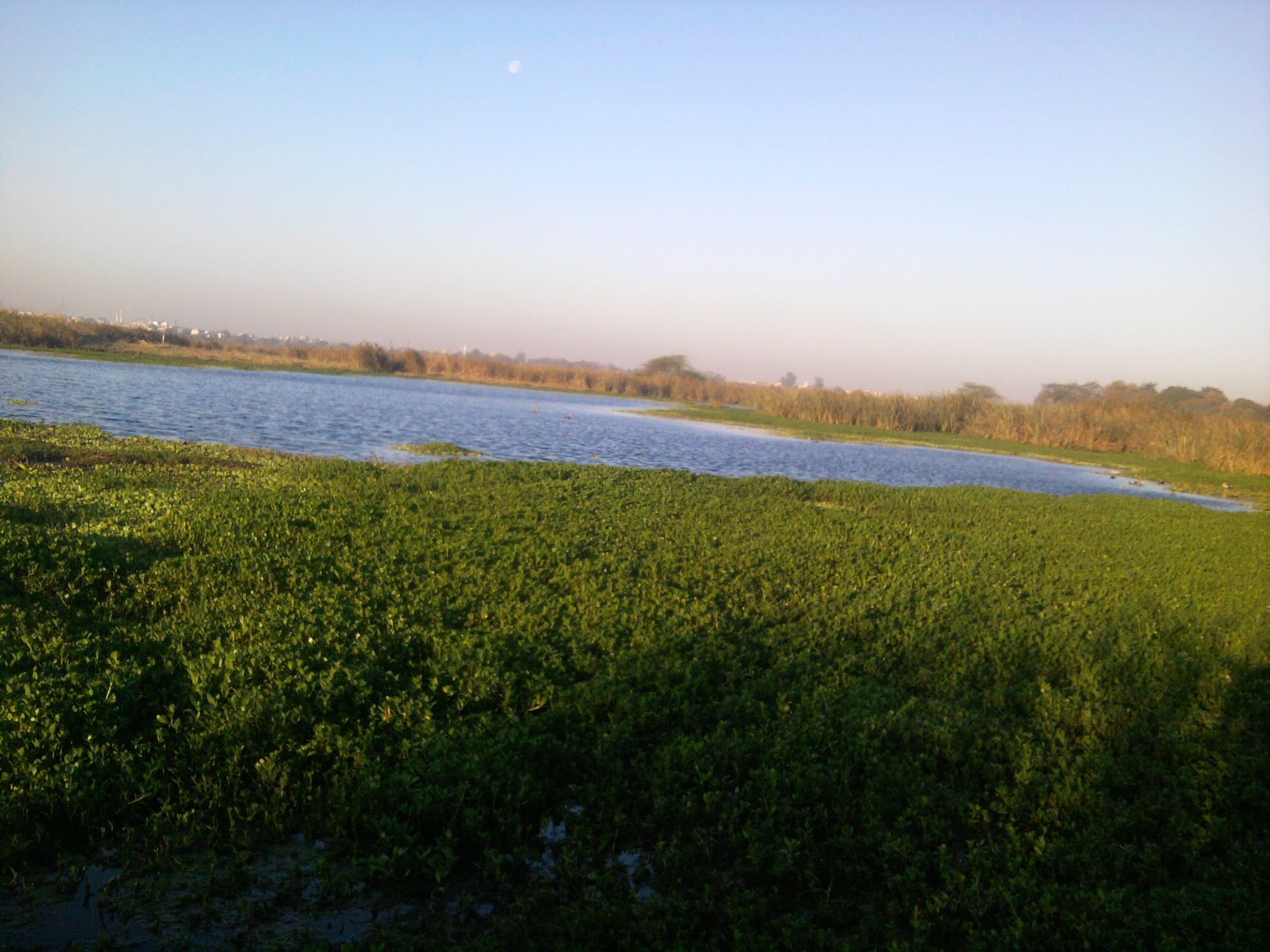
View of Yamuna from Okhla Sanctuary

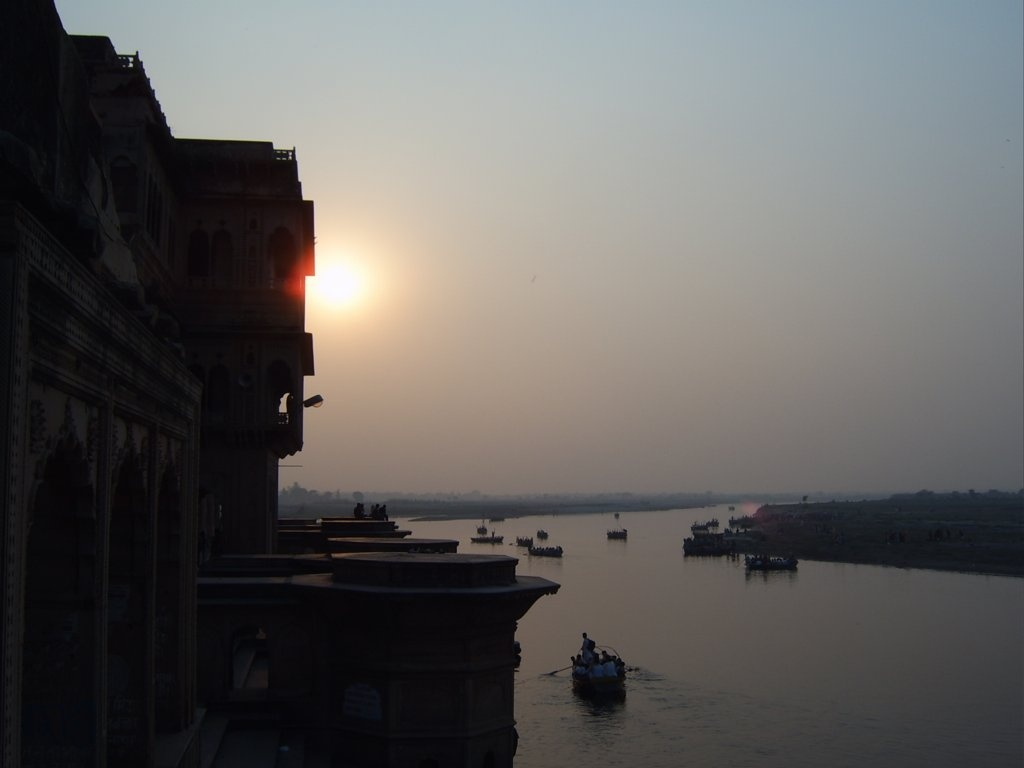
View of Yamuna from Kesi Ghata

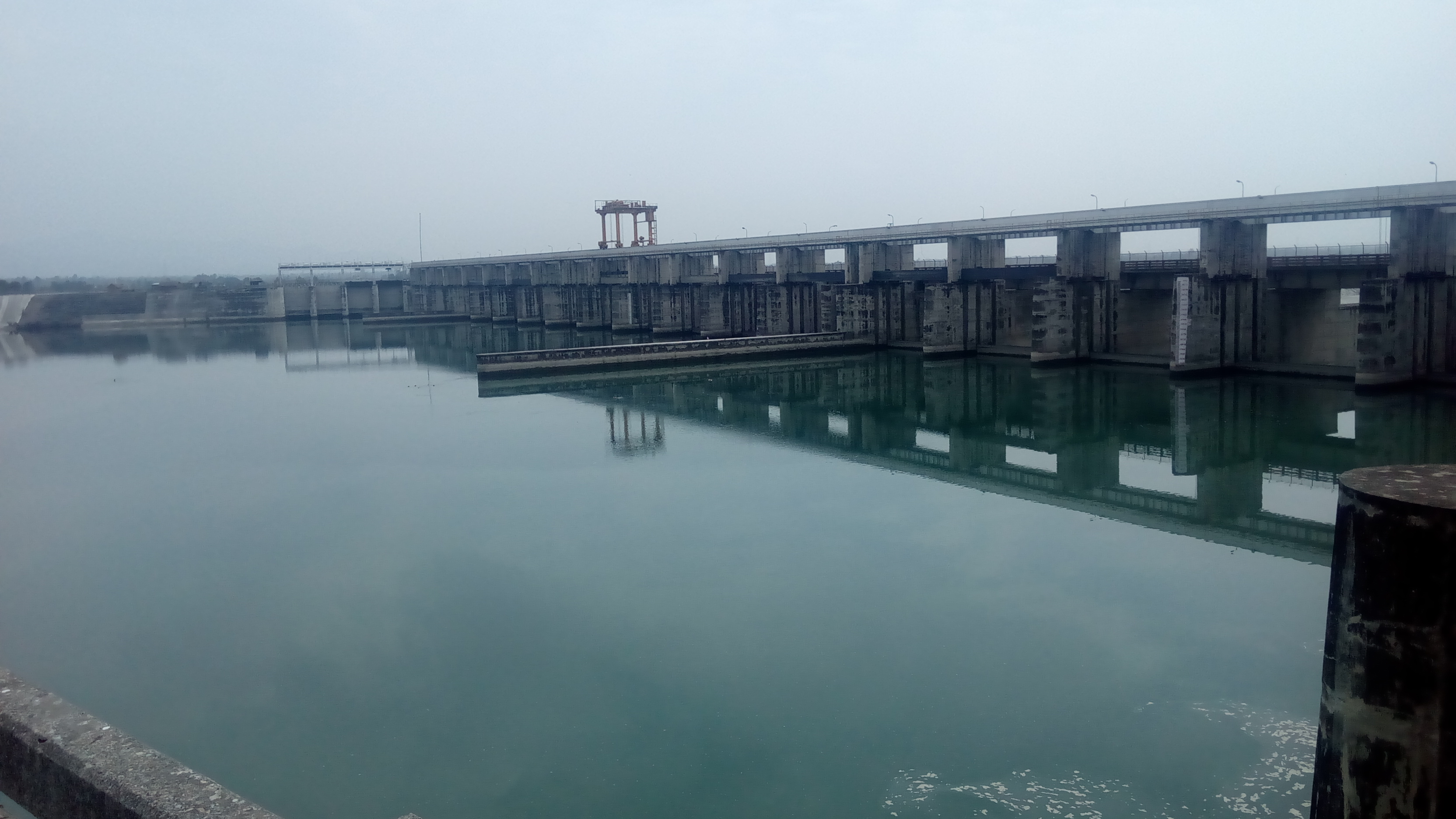
The Yamuna view from Hathni Kund Barrage

== See also ==
- Environmental personhood
- List of rivers of India
- List of most-polluted rivers
- Western Jamuna Canal Link
- Yamuna in Hinduism
- Yamuna Pushkaram
- Yamuna Pushta
- Mahasu region
