= Sasur Khaderi River =

River in Uttar Pradesh, India

Sasur Khaderi River is a tributary of Yamuna River in the state of Uttar Pradesh in India. It is a small river that flows for around 40 kilometers via Makhaupur village. It was completely dried before it was revived in 2013. It comes under Fatehpur and kaushambi district and passes close to the town. The revival work was taken under the central government sponsored program, NREGA.

== The River ==
The river in its final journey merges in Yamuna River on its left bank. The river flow dried up with encroachments on its banks since the 1990s.
