= Shani Dham Temple =

Hindu temple in Delhi, India

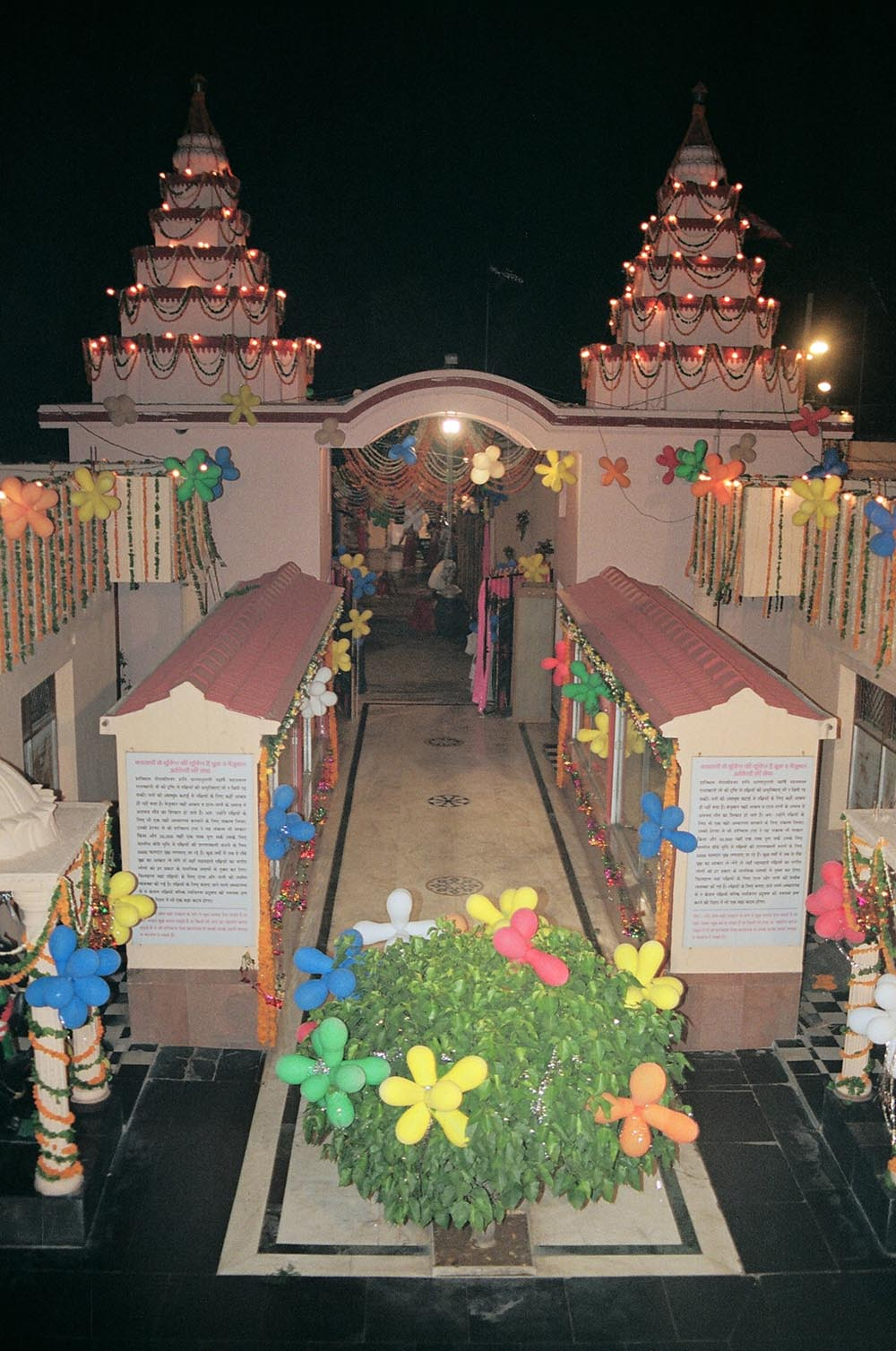

- Location in Delhi

Religion
- Affiliation: Hinduism
- Deity: Shani

Location
- Location: Asola (Delhi)
- Country: India

Shani Dham Temple is a temple dedicated to the Hindu deity Shani. It is located in Asola, a suburb of the Union Territory of Delhi.

== History ==
On 31 May 2003, a large Shani image made of rock, the largest in the world, was unveiled.

In 2018 the temple came under scrutiny for their affiliation with self styled 'godman' Daati Maharaj, who had been accused of sexual assault.

In 2020 the temple held religious gatherings in violation of local social distancing rules related to the COVID-19 pandemic.

== Description ==
The temple is divided into two parts: eastern and western. It has a library and a research center, alongside an inquiry office, reception office, and a publication department.

The eastern part is home to the large Shani idol and idols of the twelve 'Jyotirlingas'. In the western part, there are large Shani statues erected over the buffalo and the vulture. To the right of these statues is an idol of Hanuman. The western section also contains an oblation pool and idols of the nine planets.

The temple is usually crowded on Saturdays and conducts various religious programs throughout the year.
