= Yamuna Action Plan =

Bilateral project between India and Japan

The Yamuna Action Plan is a bilateral project between the Government of India and Japan, introduced in 1993. It is one of the largest river restoration projects in India. The Government of Japan, via the Japan Bank for International Cooperation (JBIC), has provided financial aid to carry out the project, which is being executed by the National River Conservation Directorate, the Ministry of Environment and Forests, and the Government of India. Phase I, which began in 1993, marked its end in 2003, although it was expected to be completed by 2000.

== Yamuna Action Plan Phase II ==
The Yamuna Action Plan Project Phase II, begun in 2003, is regarded as the core project under the National River Conservation Plan of Government of India. The project addresses the abatement of severe pollution of the River Yamuna by raising sewage treatment capacity, caused by rapid population growth, industrialization and urbanization in the towns of the river basin, which includes Delhi, the capital of India. Building new sewage treatment plants and expanding capacity of old ones and laying and rehabilitating sewers will be done to enhance the treatment capacity particularly in Delhi and Agra. These works will lead to improvement of the sanitation conditions for the residents of towns in the river basin. Public participation and awareness activities which are part of the project shall ensure the residents' recognition of the necessity of water quality conservation in the River Yamuna, and would establish linkage between the river conservation and their own living environments.

As of 2019 the project was still going forward with an additional phase to clean pollution from the river. The Yamuna is a tributary of the Ganges. Water Resources Minister Mr. Gadkari was hopeful that the Ganges River will be completely free of pollution by March 2020.
