= Tapkeshwar Temple =

Hindu Temple in Uttarakhand, India

Coordinates: 30.3572724°N 78.0166768°E

- Tapkeshwar Mahadev Temple, Dehradun
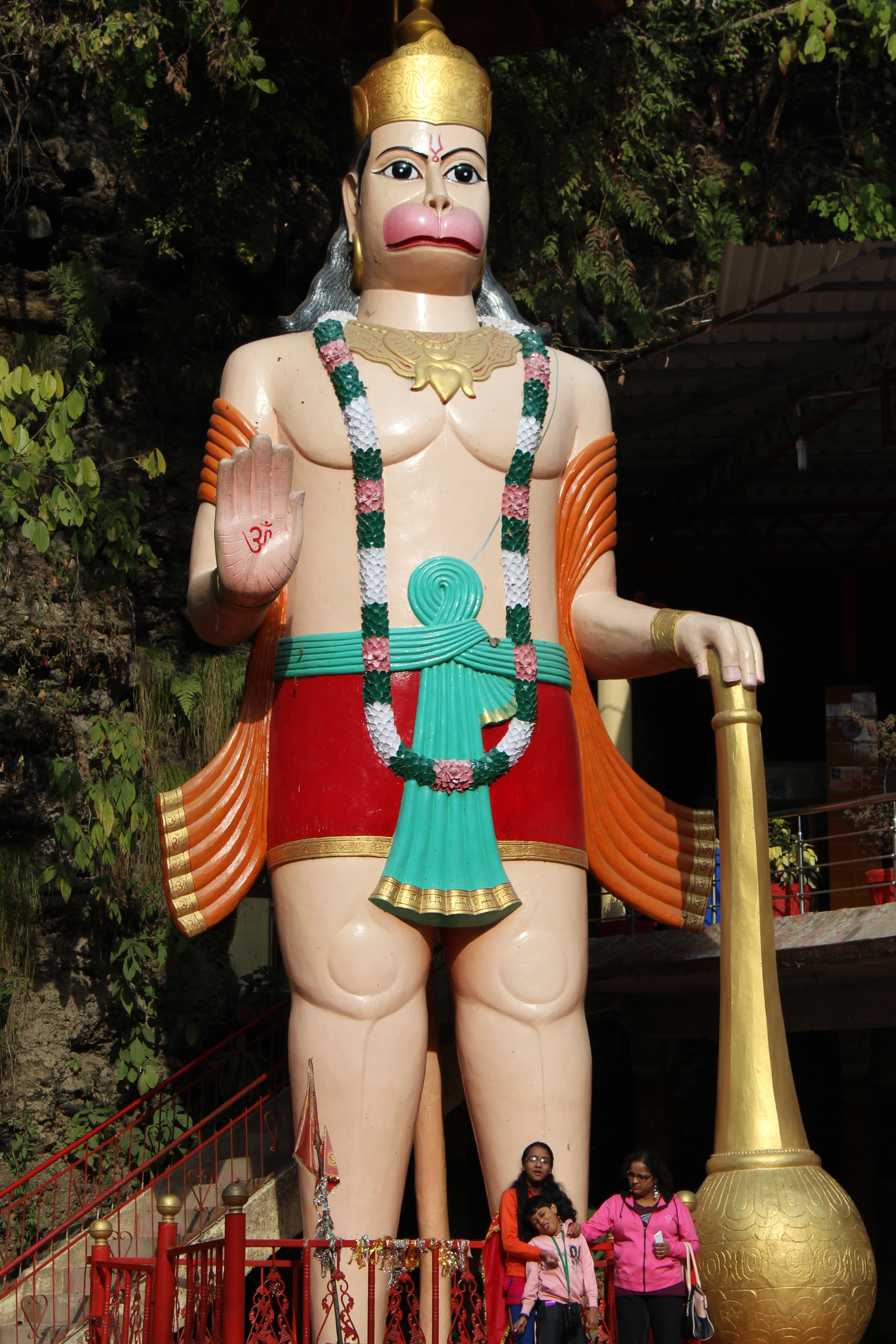
- Hanuman idol

Religion
- Affiliation: Hinduism
- District: Dehradun
- Deity: Shiva

Location
- Location: Dehradun
- State: Uttarakhand
- Country: India
- Interactive map of Tapkeshwar Temple

Architecture
- Type: Hindu temple architecture

Tapkeshwar Temple, also known as Tapkeshwar Mahadev Temple, is a temple in Dehradun dedicated to Shiva. The temple is on the bank of the Tons River, built on top of a natural cave, which holds the temple's main shivalinga.

== History ==
The Tapkeshwar Temple has a natural shivalinga in the cave, which became a place of reverence for the local people.

It is also believed that this was used as a residence by Dronacharya, the teacher of the Pandavas and Kauravas in the Hindu epic Mahabharata; the cave is called Drona Cave after him. Dronacharya's wife Kalyani was unable to breastfeed their newborn son Ashwatthama. As Dronacharya was unable to afford a cow or cow's milk, Ashwatthama prayed to Shiva, who then fed him milk dripping from the shivalinga in the cave.

== Operations ==
The temple is popular as both a tourist destination and a pilgrimage site in Dehradun. Pilgrims bathe in the nearby sulphur-water springs before entering the temple.

Drona Cave, surrounded by hills, is a popular site for picnickers from Dehradun and nearby districts.

== Events ==
Every year during Mahashivratri, a fair is held in Tapkeshwar Mahadev temple for over a week. On this day, Shiva devotees come here from far and wide. On the day of Mahashivratri, the temple is decorated with lighting and flowers. Mahaprasad is organized for the devotees visiting here by the temple trust. On this auspicious occasion, the form of Mahadev "Aghori" is also seen here. Who come from Kedarnath and Badrinath. Apart from Mahashivratri, devotees also visit this temple for darshan in the month of Shravan. This temple is open every day from 6 am to 7 pm, but in Shravan the temple is kept open day and night, so that all the devotees can get darshan of Mahadev ji.

The temple hold a large festival on Shivratri. The temple committee organizes free meals for the devotees.

Every year on Holi, a local theater group, Hamari Pehchan, begins their holiday performance at the temple.
