= Tons River =

River in India

Coordinates: 30°29′49″N 77°48′06″E

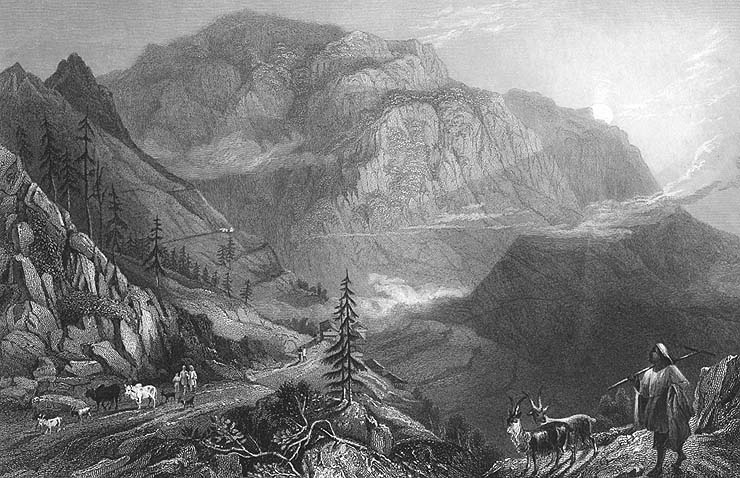
- Mohuna village, Deobun, Northwest of Landour - 1850s
- Native name: टौंस नदी (Hindi)

Location
- Country: India

Physical characteristics
- Source
  - location: Bandarpunch, Uttarakhand
- Mouth
  - location: Dehradun, Uttarakhand
- Discharge
  - location: Yamuna

The Tons (टौंस नदी) is the largest tributary of the Yamuna. It flows through cultural Mahasu region in Uttarakhand and Himachal Pradesh, marking the boundaries of the two states after Tyuni, where the confluence of the Tons and Pabbar rivers occurs. The Tons thrust is named after this river.

With its source in the 20,722 feet (6,316 m) high Bandarpunch mountain, it is one of the major perennial Indian Himalayan rivers. In fact, it carries more water than the Yamuna itself, which it meets below Kalsi near Dehradun, Uttarakhand.

== Tons Valley ==
Tons Valley lies in Jaunsar Bawar region, as it emerges from the Himalayas has haridwar on its eastern bank. The cantonment town of Chakrata is situated between, the Tons and Yamuna rivers.

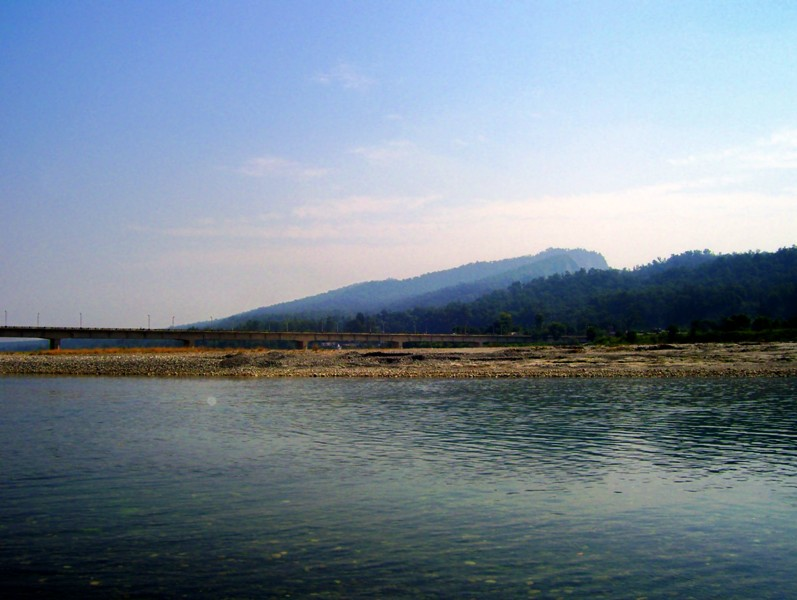
Tons River, flowing near Paonta Sahib, Himachal Pradesh. The bridge seen in the picture links Dehradun (Uttarakhand) with Paonta Sahib (Himachal).

== Tributaries ==
The Pabbar River is a tributary of the Tons River connecting to it from the west. It is also the westernmost river that drains east to the Ganges. The Sutlej River is the next watershed over and is the easternmost river that drains west into the Indus.

The Asan River is another tributary of the Tons that is often named (incorrectly) after this great river as the Tons. The Asan is a confluence of two small river systems, one comprising streams flowing south from the Himalayan range running from Vikas Nagar towards Tehri (with Mussorie in the centre), and the other comprising streams flowing north-west from the lower Shiwalik hills (that separate Dehradun and Saharanpur districts). The misnomer Tons stands for the river originating from the Mussorie hills, flowing down through Robber's cave, Bijapur canal and Tapkeshwar Mahadev, before emerging into a broad valley behind IMA. This river receives substantial waters from several streams flowing south from the Himalayan slopes. It goes on west beyond the locality of Premnagar to finally join the streams from the lower Shiwaliks and flow toward the Yamuna, which it joins near Poanta Sahib. Asan barrage is constructed just before this confluence.

== Identification with ancient Saraswati river ==
Research points to the possibility of the ancient Saraswati river having had a source in the glacial waters of the Himalayas. The theory states that the Tons river became a tributary of the Yamuna a few thousand years ago following a tectonic event in the Shiwalik range near Sirmaur district of Himachal Pradesh. If this is true, the Tons once ran an independent course somewhat parallel to the Yamuna, running south-west into Haryana where the Yamuna merged into it, and lower down the course into Punjab, where the Sutlej merged into it. This river was then the Saraswati mentioned in the Vedic texts as the greatest of all Indian rivers. However, this is just a theory and is yet to be universally accepted.

== Geology ==
The top of the Tons river is in the Himalayan Crystalline complex. It then flows through Tethan Himalaya rocks before connecting to the Pabbar River in the Lesser Himalayan Sequence. The Tons flows into the Yamuna River after crossing into the Sub-Himalaya Sequence.

== In Art and Literature ==
An engraving of a painting by William Purser depicting a rope bridge crossing the river in Fisher's Drawing Room Scrap Book, 1839 gave rise to the poetical illustration "Crossing the River Tonse by a Jhoola" by Letitia Elizabeth Landon. The poet echoes the three stranded rope in her three-lined verses.

== Adventure sports ==
Along with Ganges, it has now become a major destination for water-based adventure sports like white-water rafting in Uttarakhand. Visitors can stay at Jaunsar Bawar region on the banks of the Tons river and enjoy the grade 4 rafting. The typical season for rafting in Tons is until July.

== See also ==
- Ghaggar-Hakra River
- Markanda river, Haryana
- Sarsuti
- Tangri river
- Chautang
