= Dakpathar Barrage =

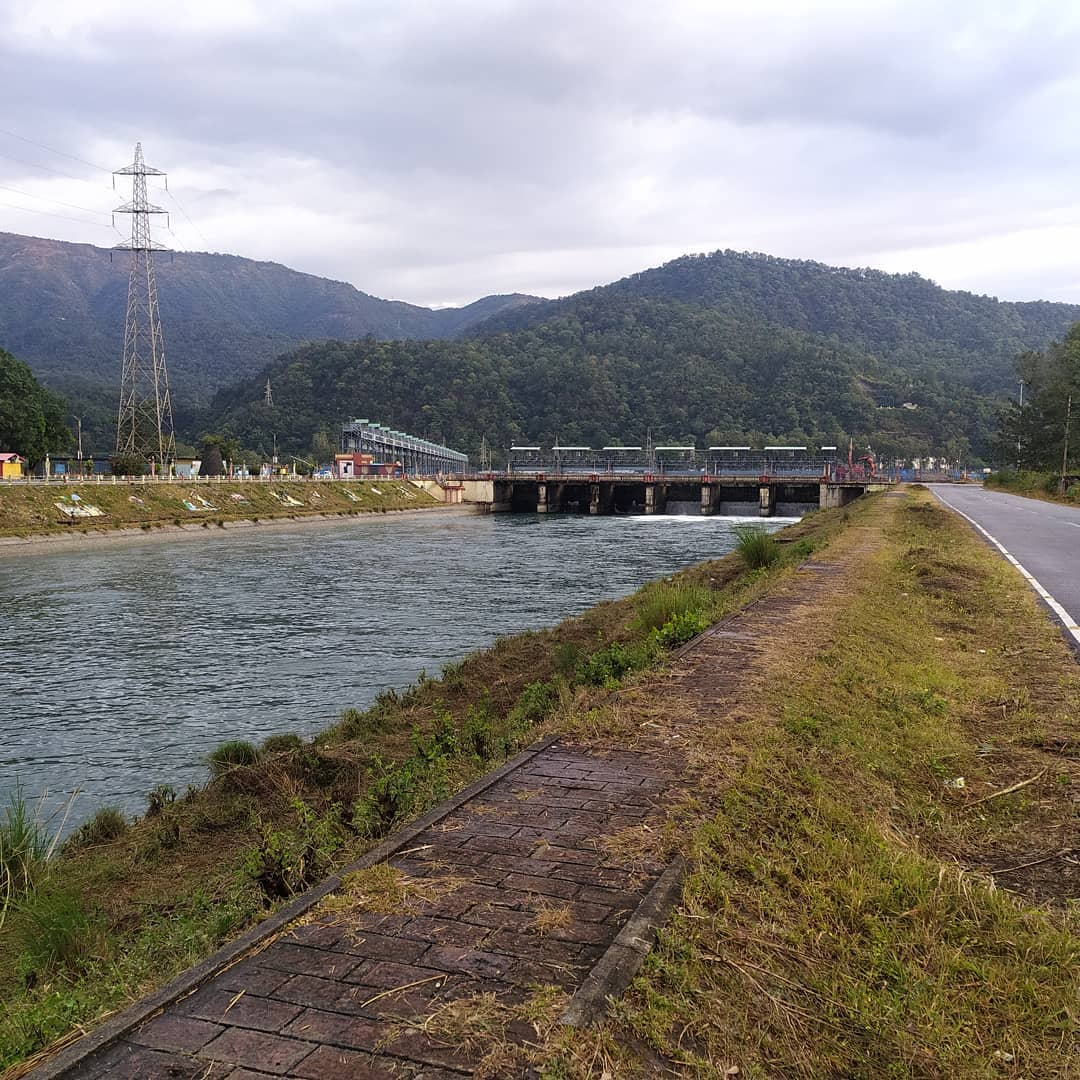
- Dakpathar Barrage, Uttarakhand

- Location within Uttarakhand Location within India
- Country: India
- Location: Dakpathar
- Coordinates: 30°30′14″N 77°47′41″E
- Construction began: 1949
- Opening date: 1965
- Owner: Uttarakhand Jal Vidyut Nigam

Dam and spillways
- Length: 516.5 m (1,695 ft)
- Spillway type: Gate-controlled, 25-gates

Power Station
- Commission date: 1965
- Type: Run-of-the-river
- Turbines: Dhakrani: 3 x 11.25 MW Kaplan-type 3 x 17 MW Francis-type
- Installed capacity: Dhakrani: 33.75 MW; Dhalipur: 51 MW

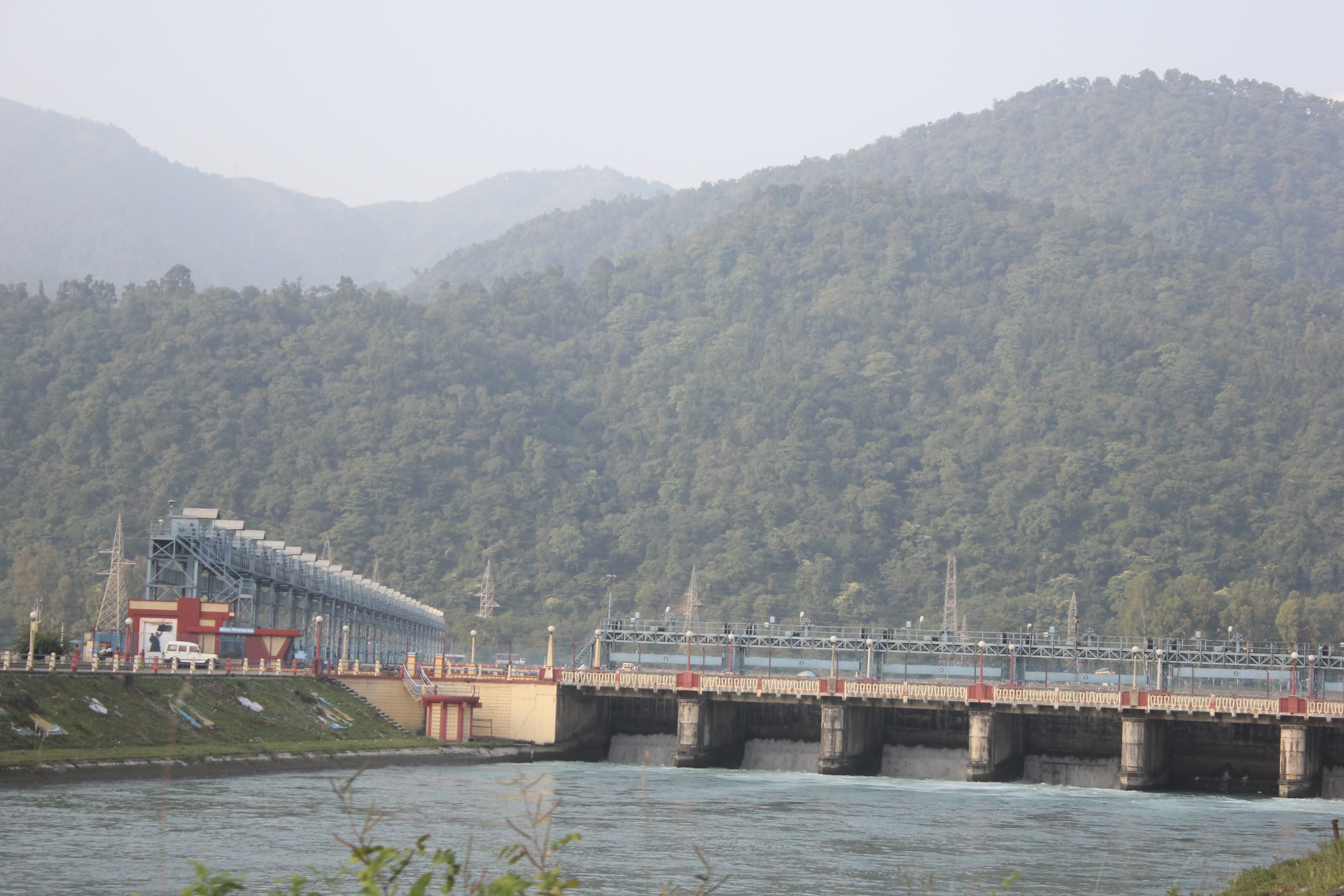
Barrage of Dakpathar

The Dakpathar Barrage is a concrete barrage across the Yamuna River adjacent to Dakpathar in Uttarakhand, India. In a run-of-the-river scheme, the barrage serves to divert water into the East Yamuna Canal for hydroelectric power production at the Dhakrani and Dhalipur Power Plants. The foundation stone for the dam was laid on 23 May 1949 by India's Prime Minister Jawaharlal Nehru. The barrage is controlled by 25 floodgates and has a length of 516.5 m (1,695 ft).

The entrance to the canal is directly behind the dam on its left bank. After traveling 10 km (6 mi), water reaches the Dhakrani Power Plant at 30°27′21″N 77°44′10″E and is utilized for power production. The 33.75 MW power plant contains three 11.25 MW Kaplan turbine-generators and has a design hydraulic head of 19.8 m (65 ft). About 4 km (2 mi) after Dhakrani the canal reaches the 51 MW Dhalipur Power Plant at 30°26′07″N 77°40′54″E. This power plant contains three 17 MW Francis turbine-generators and has a design head of 30.48 m (100 ft). Both power plants were commissioned in 1965 and have a design discharge of 199 m^{3}/s (7,028 cu ft/s). Water discharged from the Dhalipur Power Plant continues along the canal until it reaches the reservoir of the Asan Barrage.

== See also ==
- List of power stations in India
