= Dakpathar =

- Town
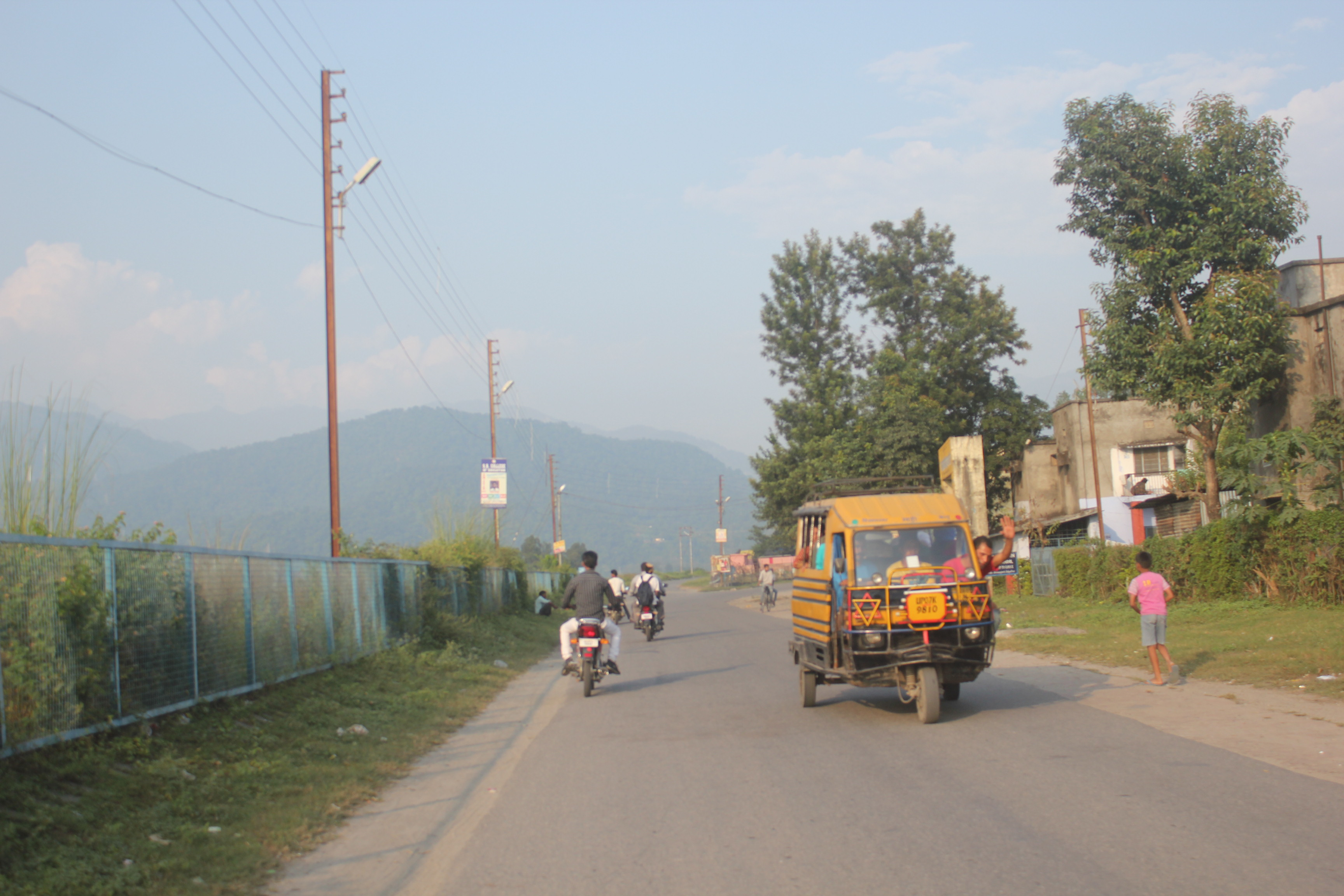
- Dakpathar

- Location in Uttarakhand, India Dakpathar (India)
- Coordinates: 30.496855°N 77.798865°E
- Country: India
- State: Uttarakhand
- District: Dehradun

Population (2011)
  - Total: 9,547

Languages
  - Official: Hindi
  - Native: Jaunsari, Sirmauri
- Time zone: UTC+5:30 (IST)
- PIN: 248125
- Vehicle registration: UK 16
- Website: uk.gov.in

Dakpathar, also spelled Dakpatthar and Dak Pather is a small hill town situated in Dehradun district of Uttarakhand, India. It is located at the border of Uttarakhand and Himachal Pradesh. It is on the left bank of the Yamuna River and 45 km (28 mi) northwest of the city of Dehradun. Dakpathar lies about 790 meters (2,590 ft) above sea level at the foothills of Shivalik range. It is the location of the Dakpathar Barrage, which forms a reservoir along the town that is popular for recreation. The Dam itself is 518 m (1,699 ft) long and is a combination of river Yamuna and river tons at khodri. It serves to divert water into the East Yamuna Canal for hydroelectric power production at the Dhakrani and Dhalipur Power Plants.
