= Pul Pehladpur =

- Neighbourhood of Delhi
- Location in India
- Coordinates: 28°29′52″N 77°17′41″E
- Country: India
- State: Delhi
- District: South East Delhi
- Tehsil: Kalkaji

Population (2011)
  - Total: 69,657

Languages
  - Official: Hindi, English
- Time zone: UTC+5:30 (IST)
- PIN: 110044
- Lok Sabha constituency: South Delhi
- Vidhan Sabha constituency: Tughlakabad
- Civic agency: MCD

Pul Pehladpur is a census town in South East Delhi district of Delhi, India.

== Demographics ==
As of 2011 India Census, Pul Pehladpur had a population of 69,657. Males constitute 54.5% of the population and females 45.5%. Pul Pehladpur has an average literacy rate of 84.4%, higher than the national average of 73%: male literacy is 91.28%, and female literacy is 76.23%. In Pul Pehladpur, 13.87% of the population is under 6 years of age.

== Connectivity ==
=== Road ===
Pul Pehladpur is connected to the whole Delhi by M.B(Mehrauli-Badarpur)road. It is also connected to Faridabad by Surajkund Road.

=== Metro ===
The nearest metro stations are Tughlakabad and Badarpur Border on Violet Line, both of which are about 1 km from Pehladpur.

=== Railway ===
The nearest railway station is Tughlakabad railway station.
