= Badarpur =

Badarpur may refer to:

- Badarpur, Assam, a town in Assam, India
  - Badarpur, Assam Assembly constituency
  - Badarpur railway station
- Badarpur, Bangladesh, Barisal Division, Bangladesh
- Badarpur, Budaun, a village in Uttar Pradesh, India
- Badarpur, Delhi, a town in Delhi, India
  - Badarpur, Delhi Assembly constituency
  - Badarpur Border metro station
  - Badarpur Thermal Power Station
- Badarpur, Gujarat, a village in Gujarat, India
- Badarpur Railway Town, Assam, India
- Badarpur, Uttar Pradesh or Badalpur, a village in Gautam Buddh Nagar, Uttar Pradesh, India

== See also ==
- Badarpur Assembly constituency (disambiguation)
- Badalpur (disambiguation)
