= Tughlakabad Station metro station =

Metro station in Delhi, India

Tughlakabad Station

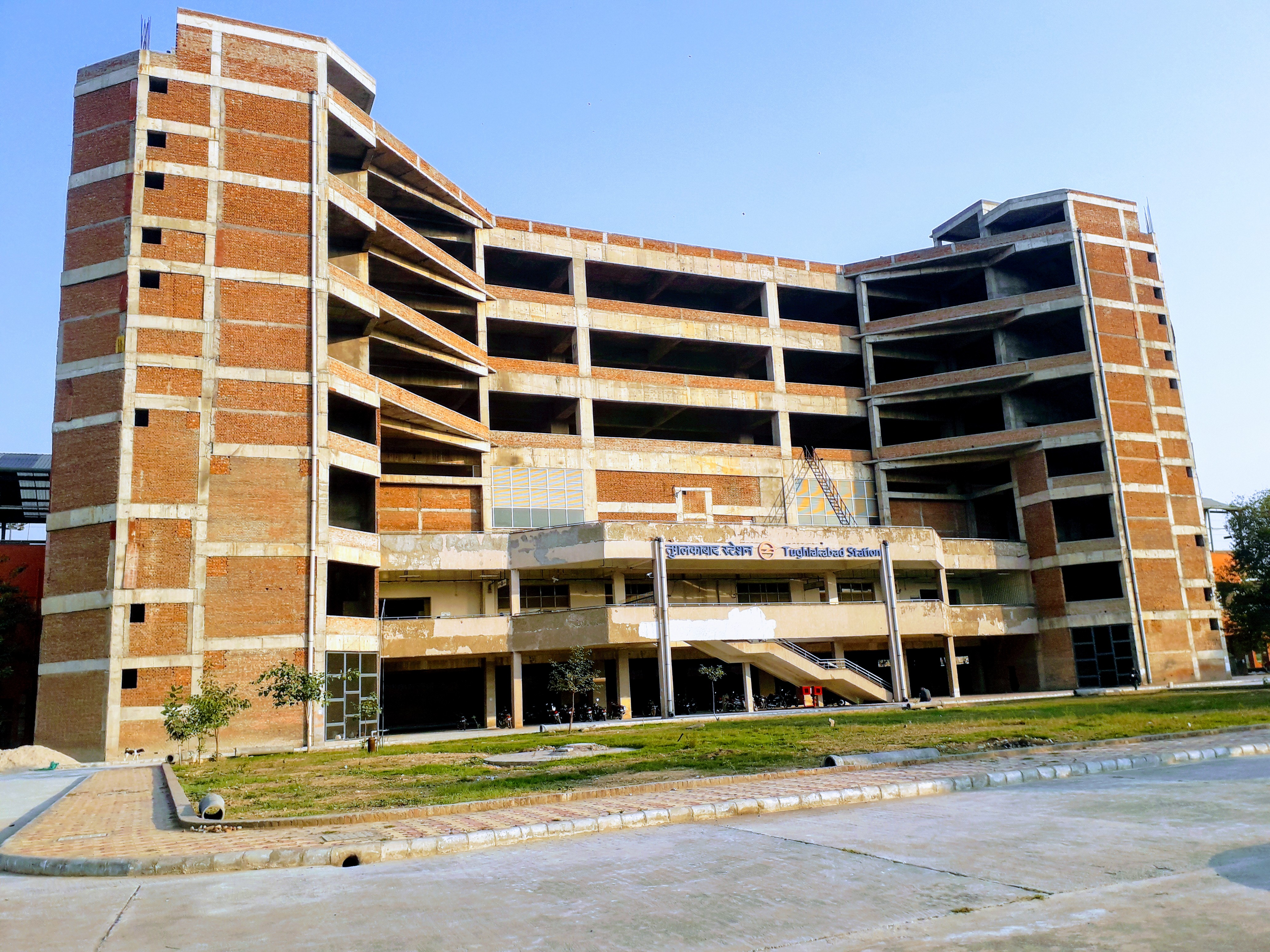

General information
- Location: Mohan Cooperative Industrial Estate, Tughlakabad, New Delhi, 110044
- Coordinates: 28°30′09″N 77°17′58″E
- System: Delhi Metro station
- Owner: Delhi Metro
- Operator: Delhi Metro Rail Corporation (DMRC)
- Line: Violet Line Golden Line
- Platforms: Side platform; Platform-1 → Raja Nahar Singh (Ballabhgarh); Platform-2 → Kashmere Gate
- Tracks: 2
- Connections: Tughlakabad

Construction
- Structure type: Elevated, Double-track
- Platform levels: 2
- Parking: Available
- Accessible: Yes

Other information
- Status: Staffed, Operational
- Station code: TKDS

History
- Opened: 14 January 2011; 15 years ago
- Electrified: 25 kV 50 Hz AC through overhead catenary

Passengers
- 2015: 9,880/day 306,266/ Month average

Services
Preceding station	Delhi Metro	Following station
Mohan Estate towards Kashmere Gate	Violet Line	Badarpur Border towards Raja Nahar Singh (Ballabhgarh)
Future service
Tughlakabad Railway Colony towards Terminal 1 IGI Airport or Lajpat Nagar	Golden Line	Sarita Vihar Depot towards Kalindi Kunj
Route map
Location

Tughlakabad Station is an elevated station on the Violet Line of the Delhi Metro. It is located between Mohan Estate and Badarpur Border stations.

== History ==
The station finally received safety clearance and opened as part of the Sarita Vihar—Badarpur section on 14 January 2011. It was earlier known as Tughlakabad, and was renamed in December 2014.

== The station ==
=== Station layout ===
L2	Side platform | Doors will open on the left
L2	Platform 1 Southbound	Towards → Raja Nahar Singh (Ballabhgarh); Next Station: Badarpur Border
L2	Platform 2 Northbound	Towards ← Kashmere Gate; Next Station: Mohan Estate
L2	Side platform | Doors will open on the left
L1	Concourse	Fare control, station agent, Metro Card vending machines, crossover
G	Street Level	Exit/Entrance

=== Facilities ===
The station also houses several ATMs, food kiosks and a book store run by WH Smith. List of available ATM at Tughlakabad metro station are IndusInd Bank

== Entry/Exit ==
Tughlakabad metro station Entry/exits
Gate No-1	Gate No-2
Tughlakabad Railway Station	Jaitpur Crossing
Surajkund, Faridabad	Badarpur Village

== Connections ==
The Tughlakabad Station metro station is situated opposite the Badarpur SBI Main Branch. It connects with the Escort Mujesar metro station in the south and the Central Secretariat Metro Station in the north direction.

=== Bus ===
Delhi Transport Corporation bus routes number 8, 34, 34A, 405, 405A, 405ASTL, 460, 460CL, 460STL, 473, 473CL, 479ACL, 479CL, 479STL, 724A, CS-12, CS-13A, CS-13B, CS-14A, CS-14B from outside metro station stop.

=== Rail ===
The Tughlakabad railway station of Indian Railways is situated nearby.

== See also ==
- Delhi
- Sarita Vihar
- Tughlaqabad Fort
- List of Delhi Metro stations
- Transport in Delhi
- Delhi Metro Rail Corporation
- Delhi Suburban Railway
- Delhi Monorail
- Delhi Transport Corporation
- South East Delhi
- New Delhi
- National Capital Region (India)
- List of rapid transit systems
- List of metro systems
