= Badalpur =

Badalpur is the name of several towns and villages in India. It may refer to:

- Badalpur, Gautam Buddh Nagar, or Badarpur, a village in Uttar Pradesh, India
- Badalpur, Patna or Badalpura, a town in Patna district, Bihar
- Badalpur, Jaunpur district, a village in Uttar Pradesh
- Badalpur, a village in Nalanda district, Bihar

== See also ==
- Badarpur (disambiguation)
