= Mohan Estate metro station =

Metro station in Delhi, India

Mohan Estate

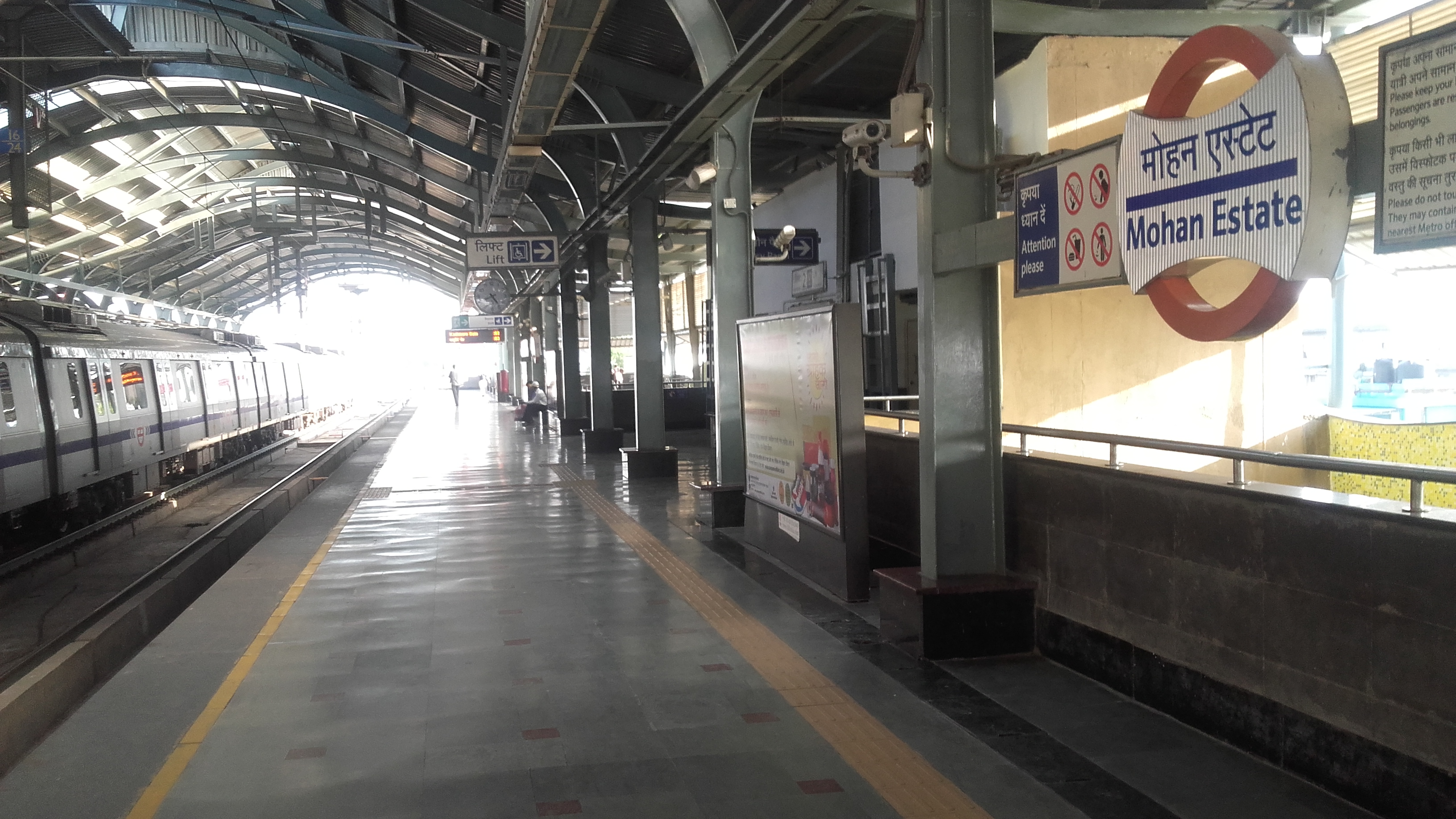

General information
- Location: Block B, Mohan Cooperative Industrial Estate, Badarpur, New Delhi, 110076
- Coordinates: 28°31′11″N 77°17′41″E
- System: Delhi Metro station
- Owner: Delhi Metro
- Operator: Delhi Metro Rail Corporation (DMRC)
- Line: Violet Line
- Platforms: Side platform; Platform-1 → Raja Nahar Singh (Ballabhgarh); Platform-2 → Kashmere Gate
- Tracks: 2

Construction
- Structure type: Elevated, Double-track
- Platform levels: 2
- Parking: Available
- Accessible: Yes

Other information
- Status: Staffed, Operational
- Station code: METE

History
- Opened: 14 January 2011; 15 years ago
- Electrified: 25 kV 50 Hz AC through overhead catenary

Passengers
- 2015: 6,454/day 200,059/ Month average

Services
Preceding station	Delhi Metro	Following station
Sarita Vihar towards Kashmere Gate	Violet Line	Tughlakabad Station towards Raja Nahar Singh (Ballabhgarh)
Route map
Location

Mohan Estate is an elevated station on the Violet Line of the Delhi Metro. It is located between Sarita Vihar and Tughlakabad stations and close to the financial and industrial region of Mohan Estate in South Delhi.

== History ==
The station finally received safety clearance and opened as part of Sarita Vihar–Badarpur section on 14 January 2011.

== The station ==
=== Station layout ===
L2	Side platform | Doors will open on the left
L2	Platform 1 Southbound	Towards → Raja Nahar Singh (Ballabhgarh); Next Station: Tughlakabad
L2	Platform 2 Northbound	Towards ← Kashmere Gate; Next Station: Sarita Vihar
L2	Side platform | Doors will open on the left
L1	Concourse	Fare control, station agent, Metro Card vending machines, crossover
G	Street level	Exit/Entrance

=== Facilities ===
The station also houses several ATMs, food kiosks and a book store run by WHSmith. List of available ATM at Mohan Estate metro station are Canara Bank

== Entry/Exit ==
Mohan Estate metro station Entry/exits
Gate No-1	Gate No-2
Gautam Puri Awas, Badarpur	Mohan Corporative industrial area
Aali Vihar	Madanpur Khadar

== See also ==
- Delhi
- Sarita Vihar
- List of Delhi Metro stations
- Transport in Delhi
- Delhi Metro Rail Corporation
- Delhi Suburban Railway
- Delhi Monorail
- Delhi Transport Corporation
- South East Delhi
- New Delhi
- National Capital Region (India)
- List of rapid transit systems
- List of metro systems
