= Tughlaqabad railway station =

Railway station in Delhi, India

Tughlaqabad तुग़लक़ाबाद تغلق آباد
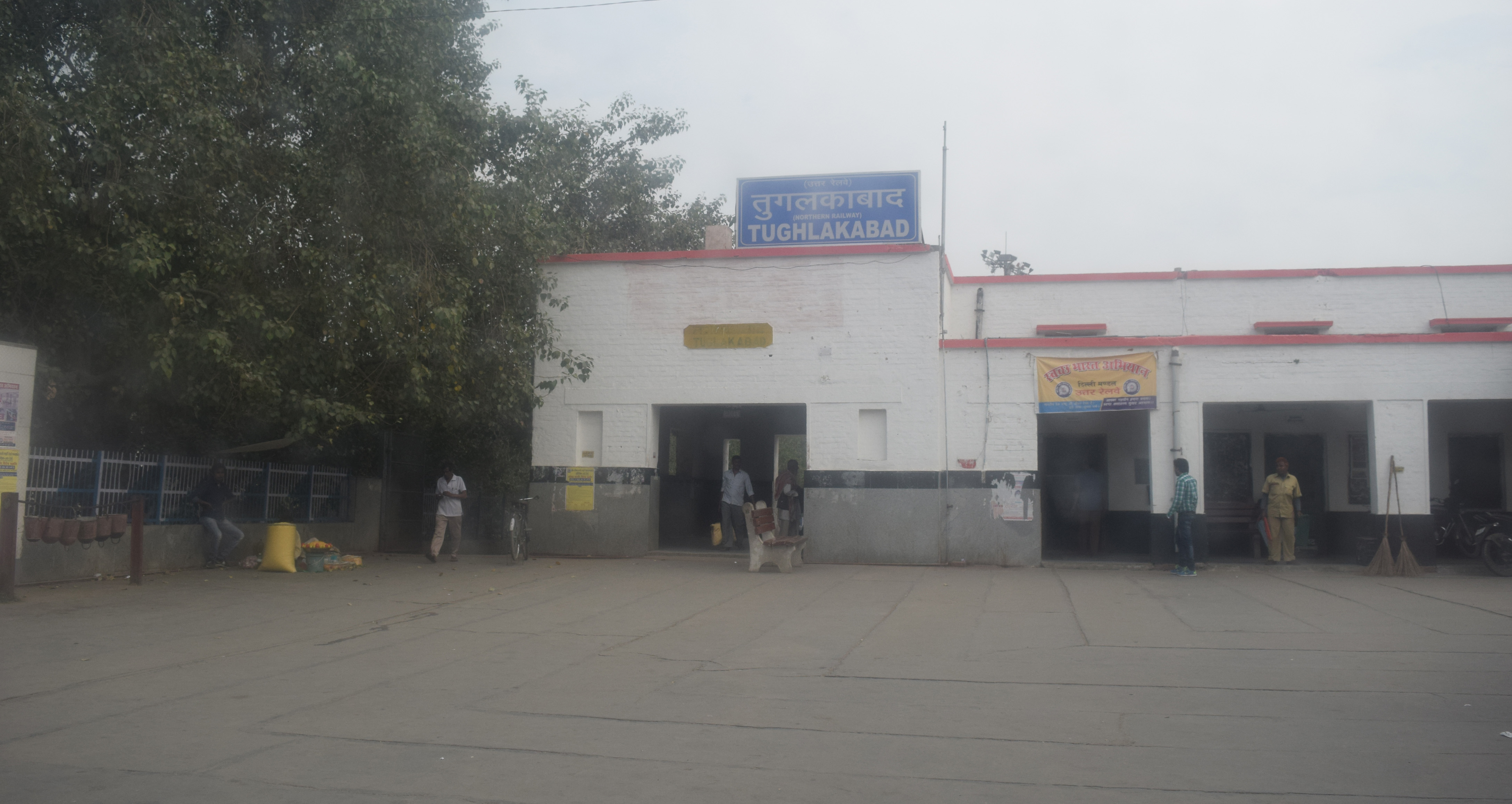

General information
- Location: Tughlaqabad, Delhi; India
- Coordinates: 28°30′13″N 77°17′47″E
- Elevation: 213.317 metres (699.86 ft)
- System: Indian Railway and Delhi Suburban Railway station
- Owner: Indian Railways
- Operator: Northern Railway
- Line: Agra–Delhi chord
- Platforms: 2
- Tracks: 26
- Connections: Violet Line Golden Line Tughlakabad Station

Construction
- Structure type: Standard on ground
- Parking: Yes
- Cycle facilities: No

Other information
- Station code: TKD
- Division(s): Delhi

History
- Opened: 1904

Services
Preceding station	Indian Railways	Following station
Faridabad towards ?	Northern Railway zone Agra–Delhi chord	Okhla towards ?
Location
- Location within Delhi

Tughlaqabad (station code:- TKD), a railway station of the Indian Railways, is on the Kanpur–Tundla–Agra–Delhi line. Located in Delhi, it is operated by the Delhi railway division of Northern Railway

== History ==
The Agra–Delhi chord was opened in 1904. Some sections of it were relaid while the construction of New Delhi was underway, and was eventually inaugurated in 1927–1928.

== Connectivity ==
Tughlakabad railway station serves around 33,000 passengers every day. This station is part of the Delhi Suburban Railway and is served by EMU trains.

== Metro link ==
The Tughlaqabad metro station, located on the Violet Line of the Delhi Metro, is approximately 1 km from Tughlakabad Railway Station. The Violet Line operates underground from Kashmere Gate to Jangpura and transitions to an elevated line from that cusp to the Raja Nahar Singh (Ballabhgarh) metro station. The line was extended to Sarita Vihar in 2010 and to Badarpur in 2011.

== Diesel Loco Shed ==
The diesel shed at Tughlakabad was established in 1970 with an initial holding capacity of 26 WDM-2 locomotives and a planned capacity to accommodate up to 80 locomotives.

Serial No.	Locomotive Class	Horsepower	Quantity
1.	WDM-3A	3100	24
2.	WDG-3A	3100	10
3.	WDP-3A	3100	16
4.	WDP-4/4B/4D	4000/4500	59
5.	WDG-4/4D	4500	49
6.	WDP-1	2300	7
7.	WDS-6	1400	27
8.	WAG-9	6120	92
9.	WAP-4	5050	47
10.	Indian locomotive class WDAP-5	5500,4500	1
Total Locomotives Active as of February 2026			332

== Electric Loco Shed ==
Tughlakabad Electric Loco Shed is a West Central Railway zone shed located in Northern Railway territory. It was a Western Railway shed till 2003. It was originally built to serve freight traffic on the busy Delhi–Mumbai route. It houses more than 250 locos of WAP-7 and WAG-9.

== Yards and depots ==
Tughlakabad marshalling yard is a mechanised hump yard with retarders. It has an Inland Container depot with container freight station and also a domestic container terminal.
