= Madangir =

Locality in Delhi, India

Madangir Madan Gir
- Village and colony
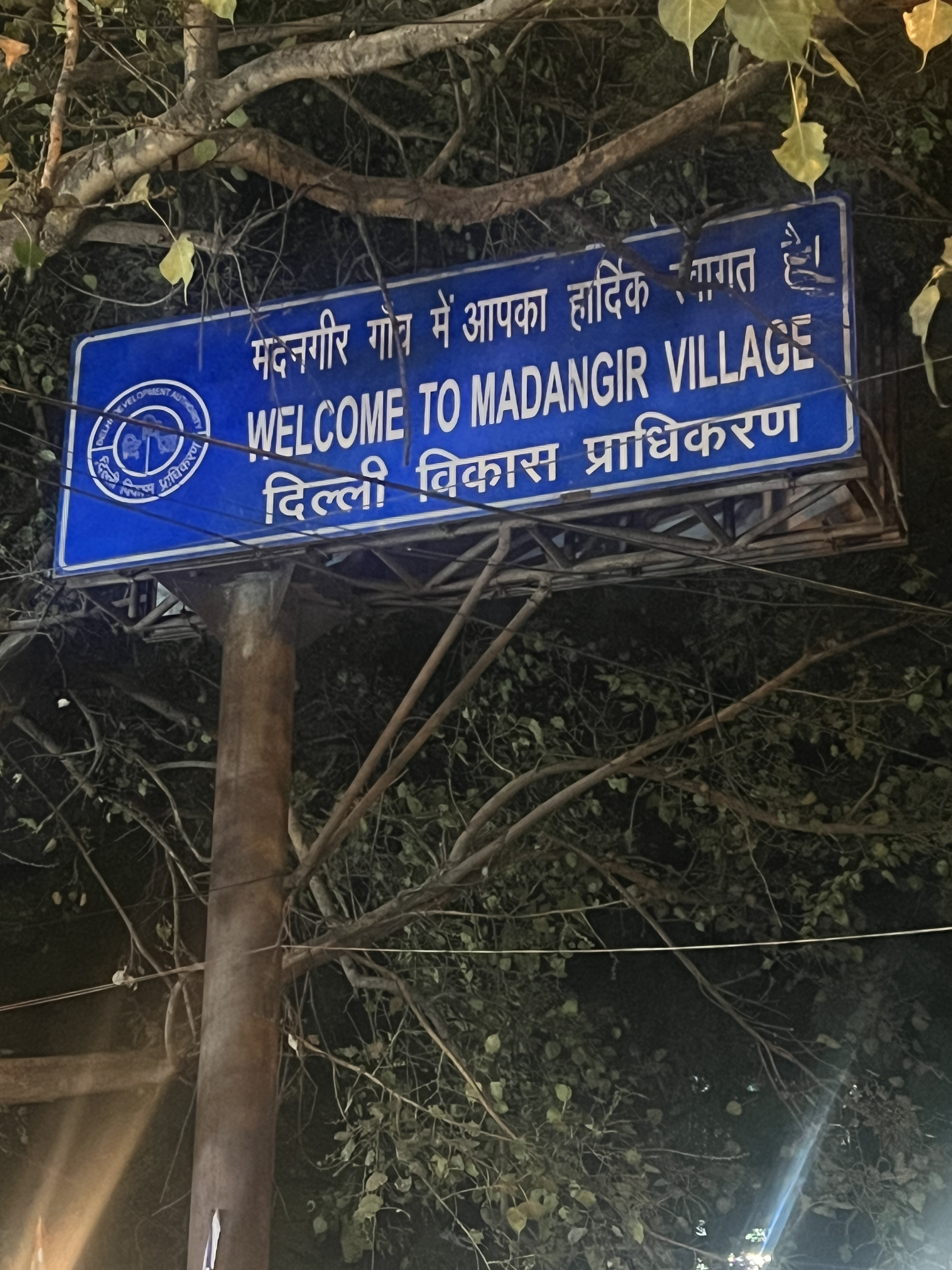
- Interactive map of Madangir
- Location in New Delhi
- Coordinates: 28°31′15.102″N 77°13′54.78″E
- Country: India
- State: Delhi
- District: South Delhi

Government
  - Type: State government
  - Body: Delhi Legislative Assembly

Languages
  - Official: Hindi, English
- Time zone: UTC+5:30 (IST)
- PIN: 110062
- Civic body: Municipal Corporation of Delhi

Madangir is a locality in Delhi, India. It is located at the Mehrauli-Badarpur road in Ambedkar Nagar Assembly constituency of South Delhi district.

Madangir includes three neighbourhoods, Madangir Village, Madangir Colony and DDA Flats Madangir. There are three markets, Madangir Market, Gurudwara Market and Central Market.

Its surrounding localities are Dakshin Puri, Saket, Khanpur, Ambedkar Nagar and Chirag Dilli.
