= JLNS =

JLNS may refer to:

- Jervell and Lange-Nielsen syndrome, a rare type of long QT syndrome associated with severe, bilateral sensorineural hearing loss
- JLNS, the Delhi Metro station code for Jawaharlal Nehru Stadium metro station, New Delhi, India
