= Jangpura =

- Colony
- Location in Delhi, India
- Coordinates: 28°35′N 77°15′E
- Country: India
- State: Delhi
- District: South East Delhi
- Metro: Jangpura

Languages
  - Official: Hindi
- Time zone: UTC+5:30 (IST)
- Vehicle registration: DL3C
- Planning agency: MCD

Jangpura is a neighbourhood in the South East district of Delhi. Flanking Mathura Road, it comprises the residential localities of Jangpura A, Jangpura B, Jangpura (Bhogal), Jangpura Extension, and Pant Nagar.

Jangpura is a Delhi Legislative Assembly constituency in the South Delhi Lok Sabha constituency, created following the delimitation of parliamentary constituencies.

== History ==
In the early 1900s, a British officer named Captain Young, who served as Delhi's Deputy Commissioner, was tasked with preparing the area for settlement. Residents (predominantly villagers) from the present-day Raisina Hills and two proximate villages near what eventually became Lodhi Gardens were relocated here, and the area was christened Youngpura in his honour. The development of New Delhi under the imperial British administration established the colony of 'Youngpura', which was colloquially bastardised and corrupted to its Hindustani equivalent Jangpura.

In 1950–51, it grew owing to the influx of many Sikh and Hindu migrants from the Punjab province of Pakistan, who arrived in Delhi at the time of Partition of India, settling in the neighbourhood. That accounts for Jangpura Extension's predominant Punjabi and Sikh population to date. This includes inhabitants from villages located in Rawalpindi district, including Thoa Khalsa, which witnessed a mass suicide by women during the Rawalpindi riots in March 1947, in addition to places such as Thamali and Mator Nara. In the 1970s, as the population of artists residing in Jangpura Extension burgeoned, it assumed prominence as an artists’ colony.

Its image, along with that of neighbouring Lajpat Nagar across the railway line, sustains as a haven for migrants, with several Afghan and Iranian refugees, inter alia, finding housing in the cheap accommodations offered in Bhogal and Lajpat Nagar; the latter is nicknamed Afghan Nagar. Many of Bhogal and Jangpura Extension's old Punjabi eateries, such as Lahorian Di Hatti and Sachdeva Dhaba, today share space with Afghan bakeries.

== Transport links ==
Districts of Delhi, with Jangpura in the South Delhi district

Jangpura Station is on the Violet Line of the Delhi Metro, which runs from Kashmere Gate in the north to Raja Nahar Singh in the south. The entrance to the Metro station is next to Silver Oak Park, adjacent to the Pant Nagar Bus Stop on the east side of Tito Marg. The Pant Nagar Bus Stop has DTC bus services to Palam, Greater Kailash, Ambedkar Nagar, Delhi Main Railway Station, AIIMS, Safdarjung, Jawaharlal Nehru Stadium, among others. Jangpura is also served by the Lajpat Nagar station on the Ring Railway service of the Delhi Suburban Railway. It is also close to the Hazrat Nizamuddin Railway Station, which lies in Nizamuddin East.
