= Vikram Vihar =

- Neighborhood of Delhi
- Location in Delhi, India
- Country: India
- State: Delhi

Languages
  - Official: Hindi
- Time zone: UTC+5:30 (IST)

Vikram Vihar is a residential colony located in the Lajpat Nagar area of New Delhi, Delhi, India. The colony is adjoined with other residential and commercial spaces including National Park, Guru Nanak Market, Old Double Storey, Dayanand Colony and Amar Colony. Vikram Vihar is well-connected to the Delhi Metro and the nearest metro station is the Moolchand Metro station on the Violet line. Hotel Park Inn is also located in the same vicinity.
