= Golf Links, New Delhi =

Golf Links, New Delhi Golf Links
- City
- Location in Delhi, India
- Coordinates: 28°35′52″N 77°14′9″E
- Country: India
- State: Delhi

Languages
  - Official: Hindi, English
- Time zone: UTC+5:30 (IST)
- Vehicle registration: DL-
- Coastline: 0 kilometres (0 mi)

Golf Links is a neighbourhood in New Delhi, India. It is in walking distance to Khan Market. The name is inspired by the Delhi Golf Course nearby. It is close to a similar neighbourhood called Jorbagh and is a quiet residential area.

== Overview ==
Golf Links is located in South Delhi and is close to India Gate, Supreme Court, Delhi High Court and other government offices. In September 1997, Golf Links was the site of a major kidnapping in which a four-year-old was abducted by gun-toting youths.
