= Badarpur Assembly constituency =

Badarpur Assembly constituency may refer to these state electoral constituencies in India:

- Badarpur, Assam Assembly constituency
- Badarpur, Delhi Assembly constituency

== See also ==
- Badarpur (disambiguation)
