= Khan Market metro station =

Metro station in Delhi, India

Khan Market

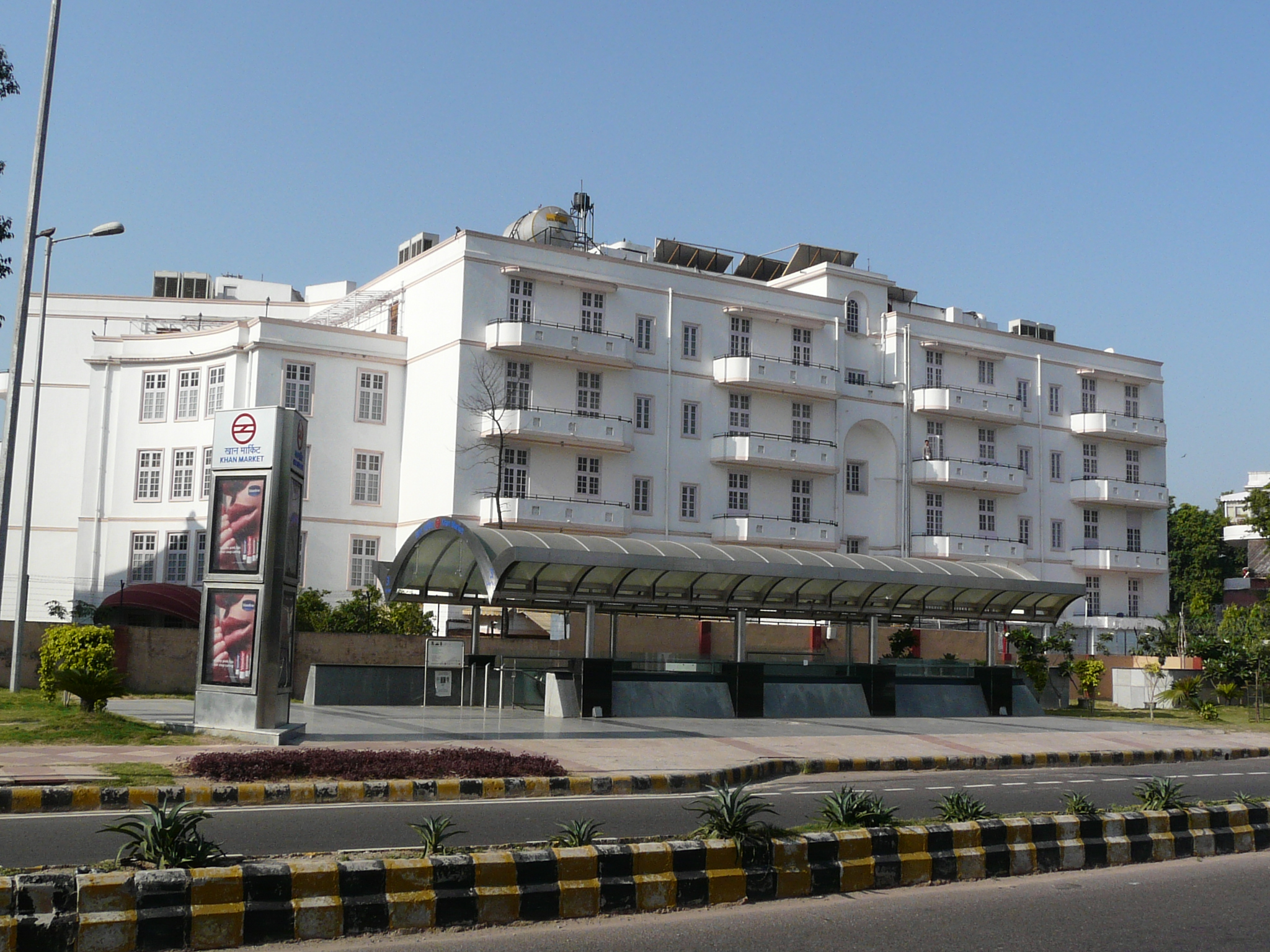
- Khan Market Station entrance and Ambassador Hotel

General information
- Location: Humayun Road New Delhi 110003
- Coordinates: 28°36′09″N 77°13′40″E
- System: Delhi Metro station
- Owner: Delhi Metro
- Line: Violet Line
- Platforms: Island platform; Platform-1 → Raja Nahar Singh (Ballabhgarh); Platform-2 → Kashmere Gate
- Tracks: 2

Construction
- Structure type: Underground
- Accessible: Yes

Other information
- Station code: KM

History
- Opened: 3 October 2010; 15 years ago
- Electrified: 25 kV 50 Hz AC through overhead catenary

Passengers
- 215,651: 6,956 (As of Jan 2015)

Services
| Preceding station | Delhi Metro | Following station |
|---|---|---|
| Central Secretariat towards Kashmere Gate | Violet Line | Jawaharlal Nehru Stadium towards Raja Nahar Singh (Ballabhgarh) |
Route map
Location

The Khan Market is a Delhi Metro station in Delhi, on the Violet Line. The station, near the Khan Market, was opened with the first section of the Violet Line on 3 October 2010, in time for the Commonwealth Games opening ceremony on the same day. Its preceding station is central Secretariat. It is near the Delhi Zoo and Purana Quila only by 0.8 km.

== Station layout ==
| G | Street Level | Exit/ Entrance |
| C | Concourse | Fare control, station agent, Ticket/token, shops |
| P | Platform 1 Southbound | Towards → Raja Nahar Singh (Ballabhgarh); Next Station: Jawaharlal Nehru Stadium |
| P | Island platform | Doors will open on the right |
| P | Platform 2 Northbound | Towards ← Kashmere Gate; Next Station: Central Secretariat Change at the next station for Yellow Line |

== See also ==
- List of Delhi Metro stations
- Transport in Delhi
- Delhi Metro Rail Corporation
- Delhi Suburban Railway
