= Khanpur, Delhi =

Neighborhood in South Delhi, India

Coordinates: 28.510°N 77.231°E

Khanpur is a neighborhood in Delhi, India, situated in the South Delhi district, on the Mehrauli- Badarpur road. Its surrounding localities are Saket, Madangir, Sainik farms, Ambedkar Nagar, plus Indo-Tibetan Border Police's (ITBP) National Centre for UNCIVPOL training is also situated at Tigri in Khanpur.
