= New Friends Colony =

Neighborhood in South East Delhi, National Capital Territory of Delhi, India

- Neighborhood of Delhi
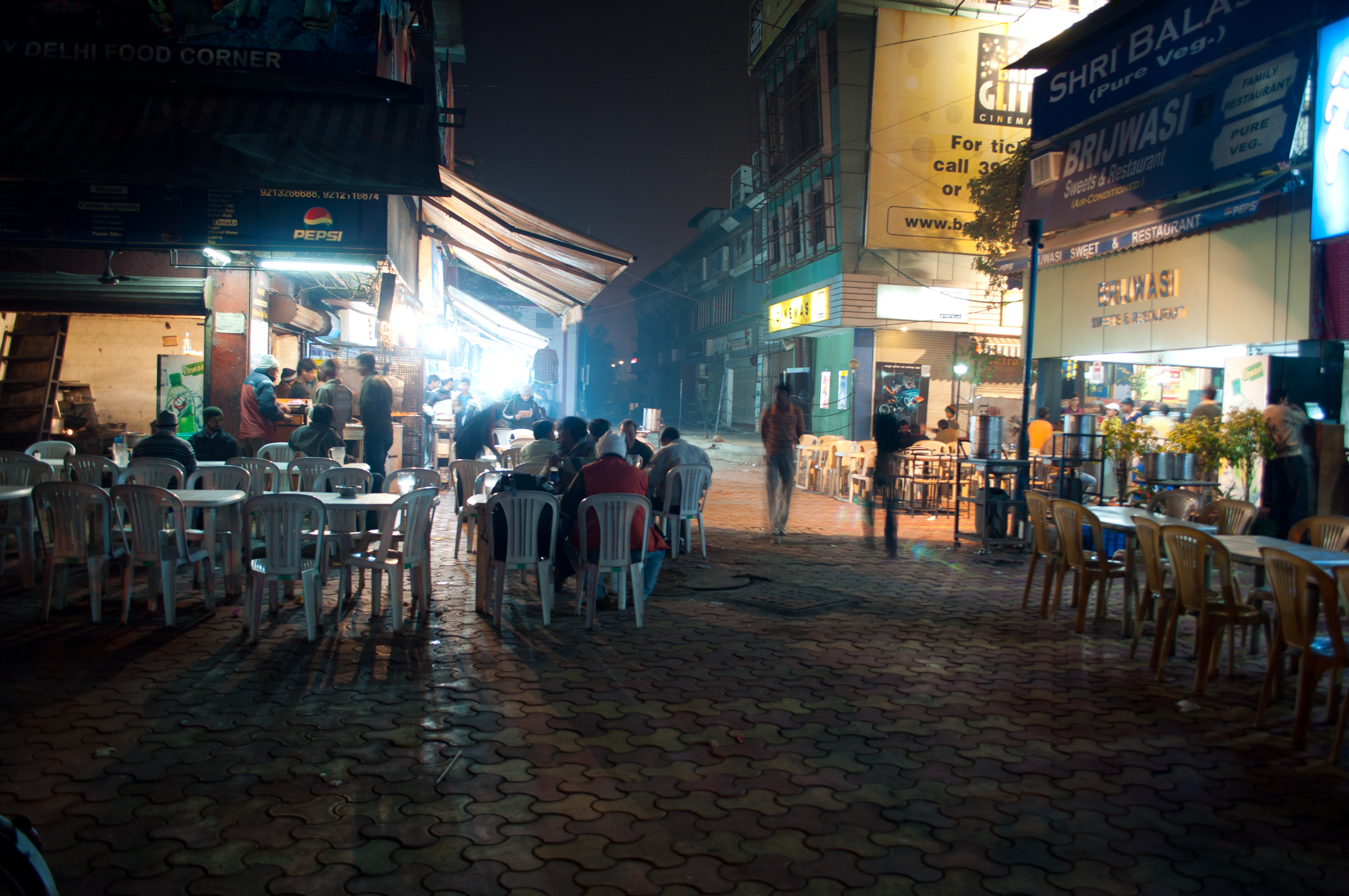

- Location in Delhi, India
- Coordinates: 28°34′N 77°16′E
- Country: India
- State: National Capital Territory of Delhi
- District: South East Delhi
- Metro: NCT Delhi

Languages
  - Official: Hindi, English, Urdu
- Time zone: UTC+5:30 (IST)
- PIN: 110025
- Vehicle registration: DL03
- Planning agency: MCD

New Friends Colony is a posh residential colony of South Delhi, India. It consists of A, B, C, and D Blocks. It is situated near the Uttar Pradesh border. NFC’s development began in the 1970s when large 800–1,000 acre plots were sold by a cooperative housing society set up by Ram Lal Jaggi, a businessman who bought land from villagers mostly from the Gurjar community to develop the place. The colony is divided into four blocks: A, B, C, and D.

== Landmarks ==
The landmarks in and around the area include Jamia Millia Islamia (A Central University by an act of Indian Parliament), 5-star hotel The Suryaa, and Lotus Tower (Berjaya Tower). Mata Ka Mandir is also located centrally and consists of many mosques and gurudwaras. Thyrocare Technologies Limited is situated in Ishwar Nagar, New Friends Colony. Sukhdev Vihar Metro Station and Ashram metro station are the nearest to New Friends Colony and run directly to Vasant Vihar and Terminal 1 Delhi Airport. Fortis Escorts Heart Institute is a hospital located in the locality. The New Friends Colony Community Centre is located near the D block and has a Cinema Hall, and many restaurants and bars.

== Nearby places ==
- Maharani Bagh
- Sarai Julaina
- Friends Colony (West)
- Friends Colony (East)
- Sukhdev Vihar
- Ishwar Nagar
- East of Kailash
- Nehru Place
- Sarita Vihar
- Jamia Nagar
- Abul Fazal Enclave
- Zakir Nagar
- Zakir Bagh Apartments
- Kihzrabad
- Batla House
- Kilokari
- Jeewan Nagar
- Ashram chowk
- Taimoor Nagar

== Notable residents ==
- Meem Afzal, former Member of Parliament, former Ambassador of India
- Ram Kumar Caroli, cardiologist, personal physician to 4 Presidents of India, Cardiologist to Jawaharlal Nehru and Lal Bahadur Shastri
- Priyanka Gandhi, daughter of Former PM of India Shri Rajiv Gandhi
- Najeeb Jung, former Lieutenant Governor of Delhi, Former VC of Jamia Millia Islamia and Retired IAS officer
- Ashwani Kumar, former Union Law Minister and a Current Member of Parliament, Rajya Sabha
- Salman Khurshid, former Union Minister
- Meira Kumar, former Lok Sabha Speaker
- M. M. Pallam Raju, former Cabinet Minister for HRD
- Shariq Us Sabah, best-selling writer and economist
- Kapil Sibal, former Union Minister
- Robert Vadra, businessman, son-in-law of Sonia Gandhi
- Shiv Nadar, Indian Billionaire (3rd Richest Indian), former chairman of HCL Technologies Ltd and Philanthropist
- Manmohan Singh
