= Badarpur Border metro station =

Metro station in Delhi, India

Badarpur Border

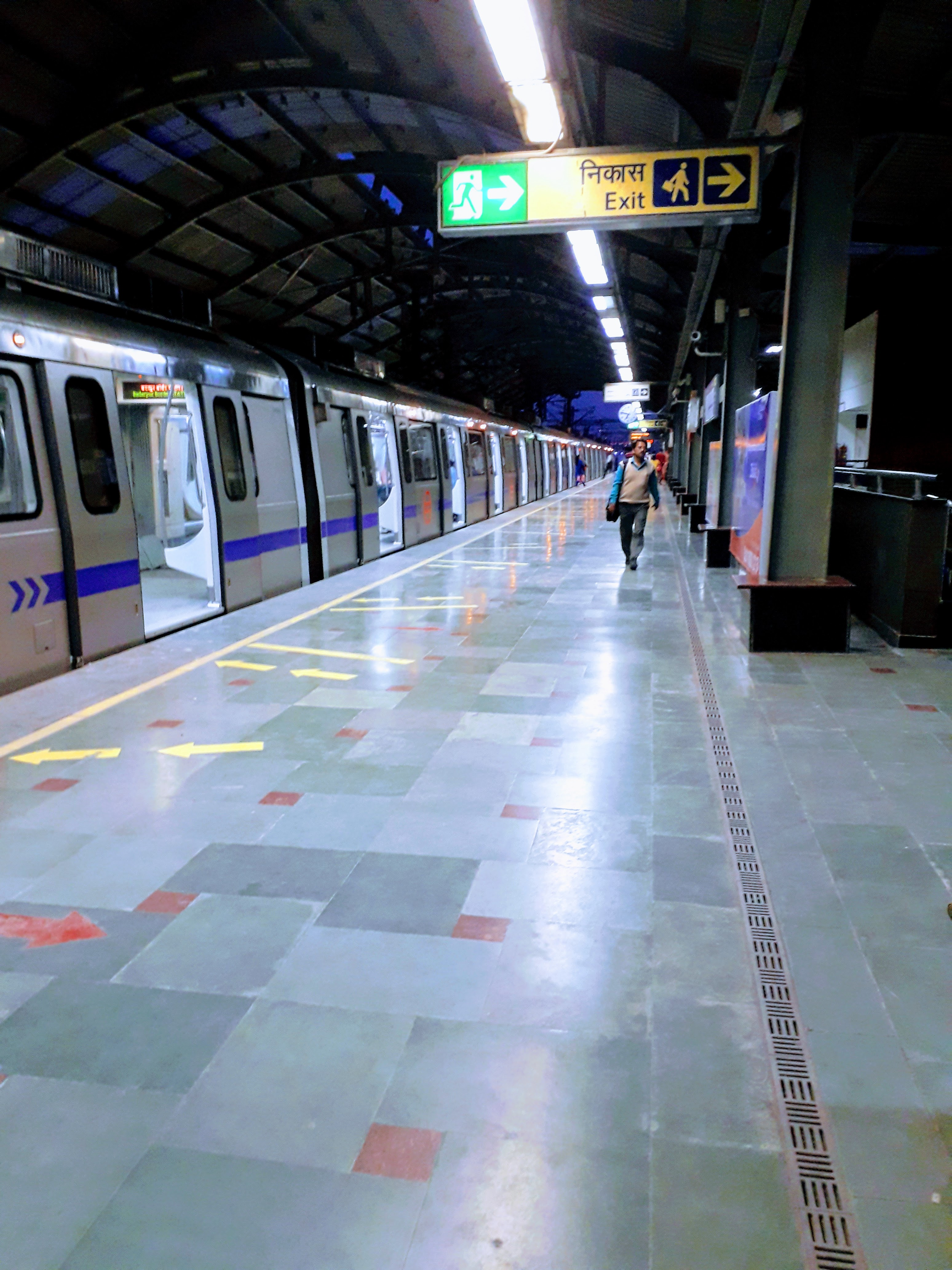
- Badarpur Border metro station

General information
- Location: Mohan Cooperative Industrial Estate, Badarpur, Delhi 110044
- Coordinates: 28°29′37″N 77°18′11″E
- System: Delhi Metro station
- Owner: Delhi Metro
- Operator: DMRC
- Line: Violet Line
- Platforms: Side platform; Platform-1 → Raja Nahar Singh (Ballabhgarh); Platform-2 → Kashmere Gate
- Tracks: 2
- Connections: Badarpur border bus terminal [Delhi Transport Corporation]

Construction
- Structure type: Elevated, Double-track
- Platform levels: 2
- Parking: Available
- Cycle facilities: Yes
- Accessible: Yes

Other information
- Status: Staffed, Operational
- Station code: BAPB
- Fare zone: Delhi

History
- Opened: 14 January 2011; 15 years ago
- Electrified: 25 kV 50 Hz AC through overhead catenary
- Former names: Badarpur metro station

Passengers
- 2015: 32,814/day 1,017,242/ Month average

Services
| Preceding station | Delhi Metro | Following station |
|---|---|---|
| Tughlakabad Station towards Kashmere Gate | Violet Line | Sarai towards Raja Nahar Singh (Ballabhgarh) |
Route map
Location

Badarpur Border is an elevated metro station on the Violet Line of the Delhi Metro, located near the Delhi-Haryana border in South Delhi. Formerly known as Badarpur, the station was renamed in December 2014. It served as the southern terminus of the Violet Line until 5 September 2015, when the line was extended into Faridabad, Haryana, on 6 September 2015. Badarpur Border is the last station on the Violet Line located within the territory of Delhi before the line enters Haryana.

== History ==
Badarpur Border station was opened on 14 January 2011 as part of the Sarita Vihar–Badarpur extension of the Violet Line. It initially served as the southern terminus of the line and attracted a considerable number of commuters from Delhi and neighbouring Faridabad. On 6 September 2015, the Violet Line was extended with a 14 kilometres (8.7 mi) extension southwards from Badarpur to Escorts Mujesar in Faridabad, ending the station's status as a terminal station.

== The station ==
=== Station layout ===
| L2 | Side platform | Doors will open on the left |
| L2 | Platform 1 Southbound | Towards → Raja Nahar Singh (Ballabhgarh); Next Station: Sarai (Delhi-Haryana Border) |
| L2 | Platform 2 Northbound | Towards ← Kashmere Gate; Next Station: Tughlakabad |
| L2 | Side platform | Doors will open on the left |
| L1 | Concourse | Fare control, station agent, Metro Card vending machines, crossover |
| G | Street level | Exit/Entrance |

=== Facilities ===
The station also houses several ATMs, food kiosks and a book store run by WHSmith. List of available ATMs at Badarpur metro station: HDFC Bank, State Bank of India, Yes Bank, IndusInd Bank, Ratnakar Bank.

== Entry/Exit ==
Badarpur metro station Entry/exits
| Gate No-1 | Gate No-2 |
|---|---|
| Passengers Underpass, near Faridabad Toll Plaza | International Institute of Hotel Management |

== Connections ==
=== Bus ===
Delhi Transport Corporation bus routes number 8, 34, 34A, 405, 405A, 405ASTL, 418A, 418ALnkSTL, 433, 433CL, 433STL, 440A, 443, 460, 460CL, 460STL, 473, 473CL, 479, 479ACL, 479CL, 479STL, 511, 511A, 511ASTL, 525STL, 544, 717, 717A, 717B, 724A, 774, 874, Badarpur Border Terminal – Gurugram Bus Stand Ballabgarh Bus Stand – Panipat Ballabgarh Bus Stand – Sonipat from outside metro station stop.

== See also ==
- Delhi
- Sarita Vihar
- Badarpur, Delhi
- Tughlaqabad Fort
- List of Delhi Metro stations
- Transport in Delhi
- Delhi Metro Rail Corporation
- Delhi Suburban Railway
- Delhi Monorail
- Delhi Transport Corporation
- South East Delhi
- New Delhi
- National Capital Region (India)
- List of rapid transit systems
- List of metro systems
