= Delhi–Faridabad Skyway =

Road in India

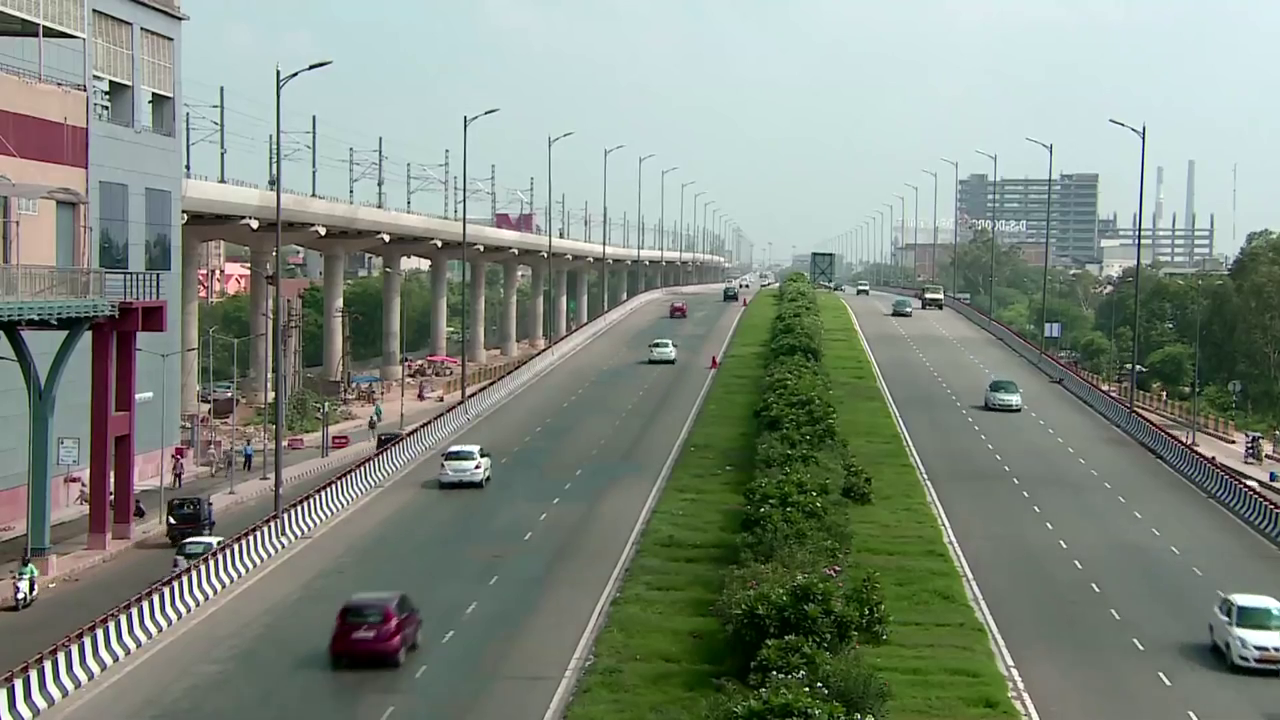
- A view of Delhi Faridabad Skyway

Route information
- Maintained by National Highways Authority of India
- Length: 4.4 km (2.7 mi)
- Existed: 29 November 2010–present

Major junctions
- North end: Badarpur, Delhi
- South end: Sector 37, Faridabad, Haryana

Location
- Country: India
- States: Delhi, Haryana
- Major cities: New Delhi, Faridabad

Highway system
- Roads in India; Expressways; National; State; Asian

Delhi Faridabad Skyway (D F Skyway) is a 4.4 km long, 6-lane wide elevated highway that connects Delhi with Faridabad, a prominent city in National Capital Region. It was inaugurated on 29 November 2010. The project was undertaken by concessionaire "Badarpur Faridabad Tollway Limited", a subsidiary of Hindustan Construction Company Limited. The highway begins at Badarpur, Delhi near DDA Flats Badarpur and ends at Sector 37, Faridabad, Haryana near Sarai Metro station.

It is a part of NHAI's North–south corridor, National Highway 44, which connects Srinagar to Kanyakumari.

== Exits ==
The following table lists the exits in Faridabad and Delhi.

City	Location	Destinations
Faridabad	Sector 37	Sector 37, Sarai, Old Faridabad, Sector 28, 19, 14 to 16, 7 to 11, NIT
Faridabad	Faridabad Bypass Road	Sector 37, Indraprastha Colony, Greater Faridabad
Delhi	Sarita Vihar	Sarita Vihar, Badarpur, Jaitpur, Mohan Estate, Ashram, Lajpat Nagar, Maharani Bagh
Delhi	Mehrauli	Mehrauli, Pul pehladpur, Lal Kuan, Tughlaqabad, Sangam Vihar

== Toll Charges ==
The following table lists the past and current toll charges:

Private vehicles	Sep-14	Sep-15	Sep-20	Sep-22	Mar-25
Single journey	23	25	28	32	35
Multiple journeys	35	38	42	48	52

== See also ==
- Expressways & highways in Haryana
