= Bata Chowk metro station =

Metro station in Delhi, India

Bata Chowk

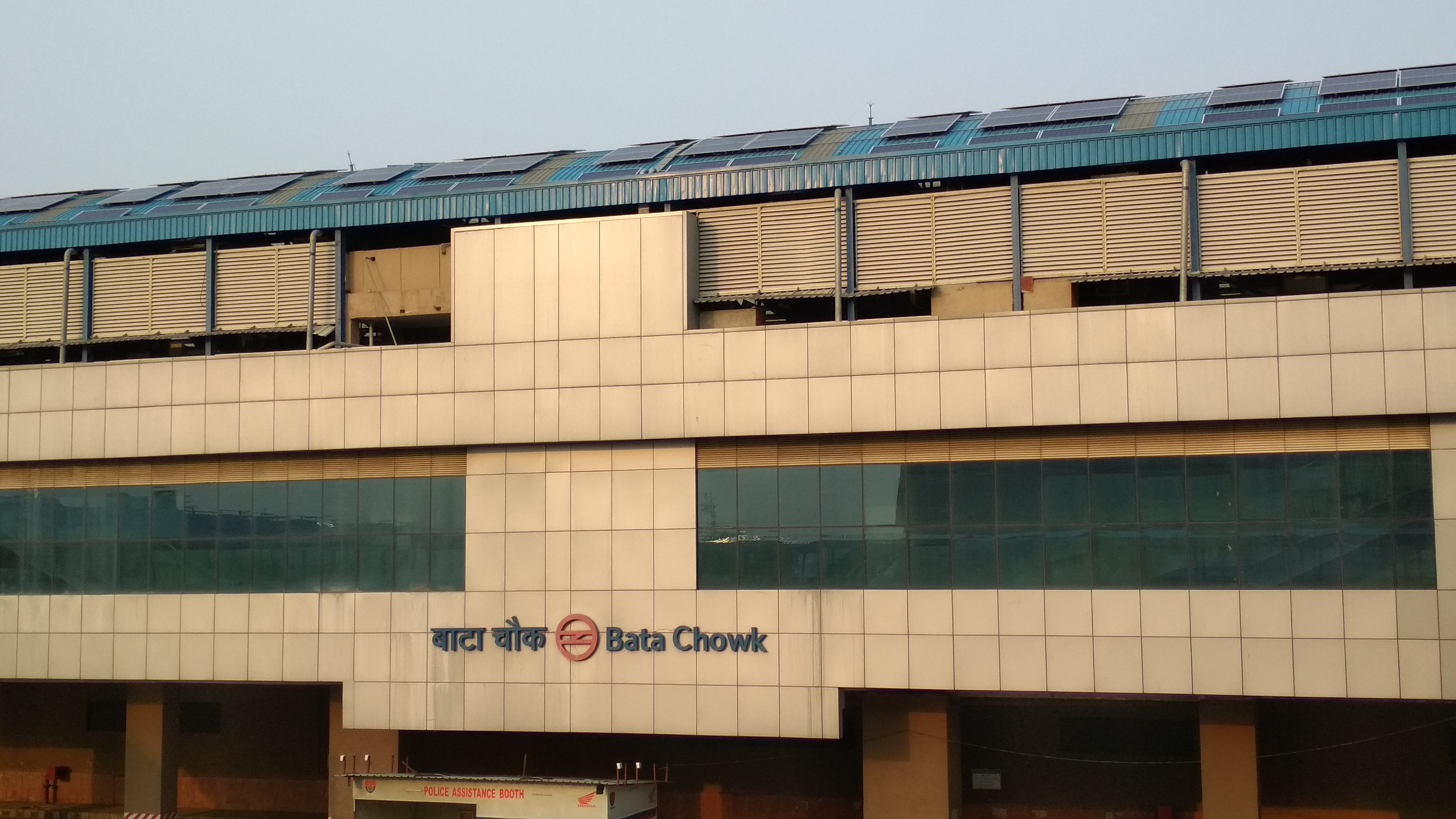
- Bata Chowk metro station building

General information
- Location: Mathura Road, Sector 12, New Industrial Town, Faridabad, Haryana 121007; India
- Coordinates: 28°23′N 77°19′E
- System: Delhi Metro station
- Owner: Delhi Metro
- Operator: Delhi Metro Rail Corporation (DMRC)
- Line: Violet Line
- Platforms: Side platform; Platform-1 → Raja Nahar Singh (Ballabhgarh); Platform-2 → Kashmere Gate
- Tracks: 2

Construction
- Structure type: Elevated, Double-track
- Platform levels: 2
- Parking: Available
- Accessible: Yes

Other information
- Status: Staffed, Operational
- Station code: BACH

History
- Opened: 6 September 2015; 10 years ago
- Electrified: 25 kV 50 Hz AC through overhead catenary

Services
Preceding station	Delhi Metro	Following station
Neelam Chowk Ajronda towards Kashmere Gate	Violet Line	Escorts Mujesar towards Raja Nahar Singh (Ballabhgarh)
Route map
Location

Bata Chowk is an elevated station on the Violet Line of the Delhi Metro. It is located between Neelam Chowk Ajronda and Escorts Mujesar station. Indian Prime Minister Narendra Modi opened the station on 6 September 2015. It is named after Czechoslovak entrepreneur Tomáš Baťa.

== Station layout ==
L2	Side platform | Doors will open on the left
L2	Platform 1 Southbound	Towards → Raja Nahar Singh (Ballabhgarh); Next Station: Escorts Mujesar
L2	Platform 2 Northbound	Towards ← Kashmere Gate; Next Station: Neelam Chowk Ajronda
L2	Side platform | Doors will open on the left
L1	Concourse	Fare control, station agent, Metro Card vending machines, crossover
G	Street Level	Exit/Entrance

== Entry/Exit ==
Bata Chowk metro station Entry/exits
Gate No-1&2	Gate No-3
I.M.T Faridabad	Air Force Station Faridabad
Edleco Mall	Radisson Hotel
S.R.S Multiflex	Sector-20
Sector 12	Krishan Nagar
Parshvnath City Mall	Vision Special School

== Gallery ==
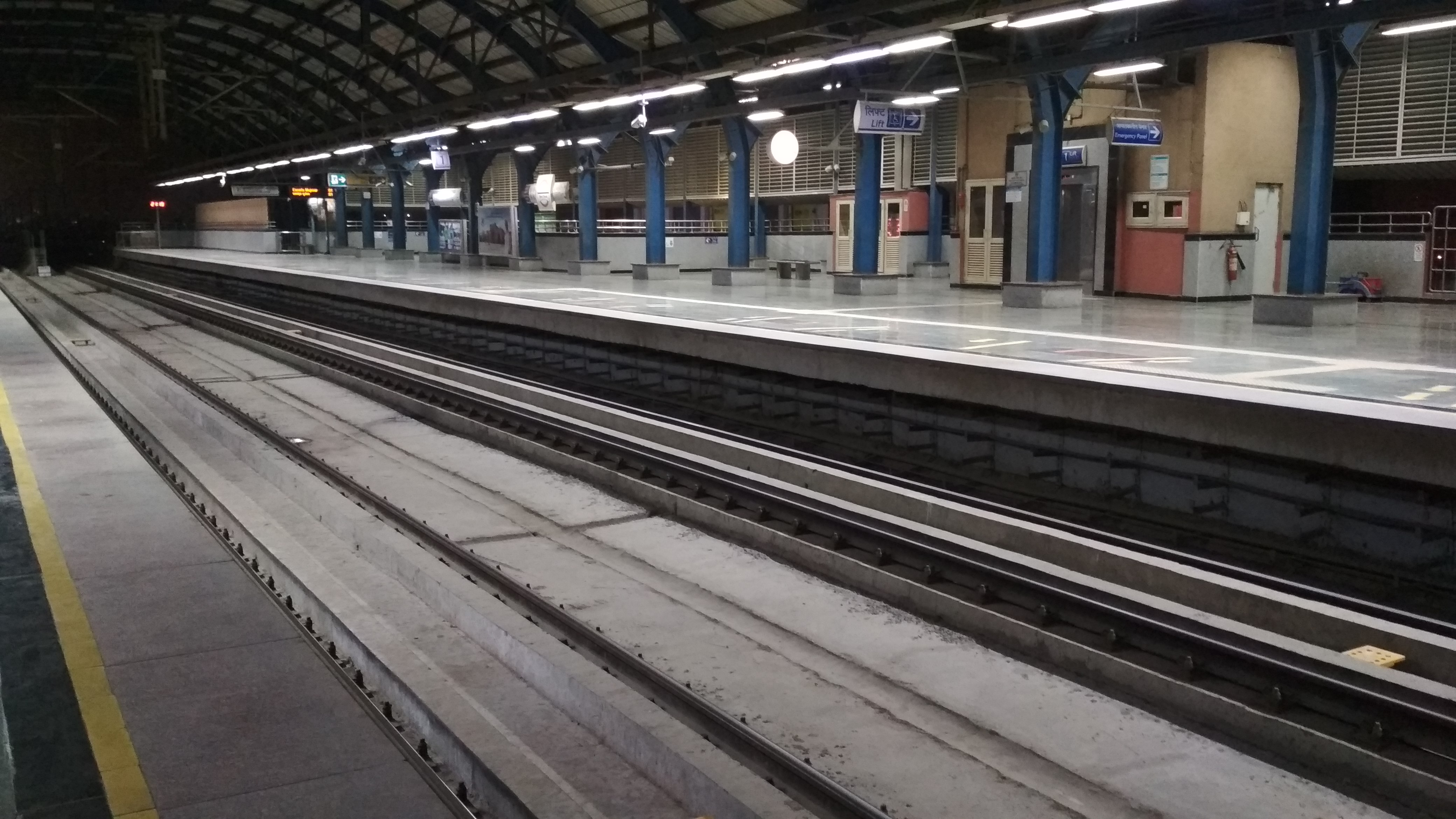
Bata Chowk Metro St. platform

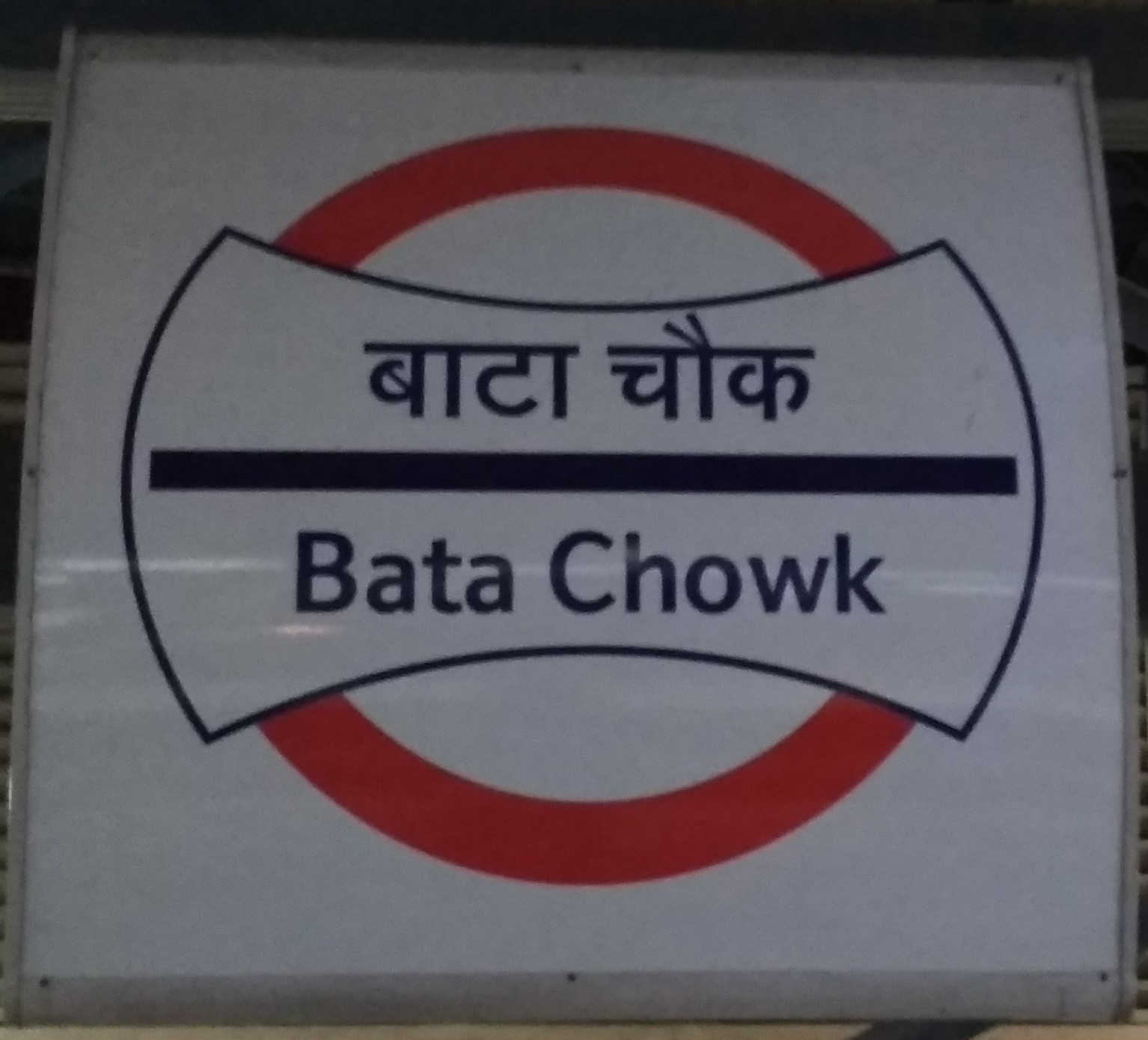
Bata Chowk Metro St. Signboard

== Expansion ==
Gurgaon–Faridabad Intercity Metro Express, for which DPR was ready in May 2020, 32 km (20 mi) long Gurgaon-Faridabad metro link from Vatika Chowk and Sector-56 in Gururam to Bata Chowk metro station in Faridabad was completed which will have 8 stations, of which the 28 km (17 mi) elevated stretch along the Gurgaon-Faridabad Road through eco-sensitive wildlife corridor will be elevated. In Faridabad, the metro stations will be located at existing Bata Chowk, Piyali Chowk, Shaheed Bhagat Singh Marg, Pali Chowk, Police Chowki Mangar, and Barkhal Enclave. In Gurgaon, the stations will be situated at Sector-56, Gwal Pahari, Rosewood City, Sushant Lok, Sushant Lok-Phase III, and Vatika Chowk on Sohna Road. It will benefit 225,000 commuters who travel between these two cities daily.

== See also ==
- National Capital Region (India)
  - National Capital Region Transport Corporation
- Transport in Delhi NCR
  - National Highway 44 (India)
  - List of Delhi Metro stations
  - Delhi Monorail, proposed
  - Delhi Suburban Railway, traditional railway
- List of rapid transit systems
  - List of metro systems
