= Khan Market =

- Neighbourhood
- Location in Delhi, India
- Coordinates: 28°36′01″N 77°13′36.5″E
- Country: India
- State: Delhi
- District: New Delhi

Languages
  - Official: Hindi
- Time zone: UTC+5:30 (IST)
- PIN: 110003

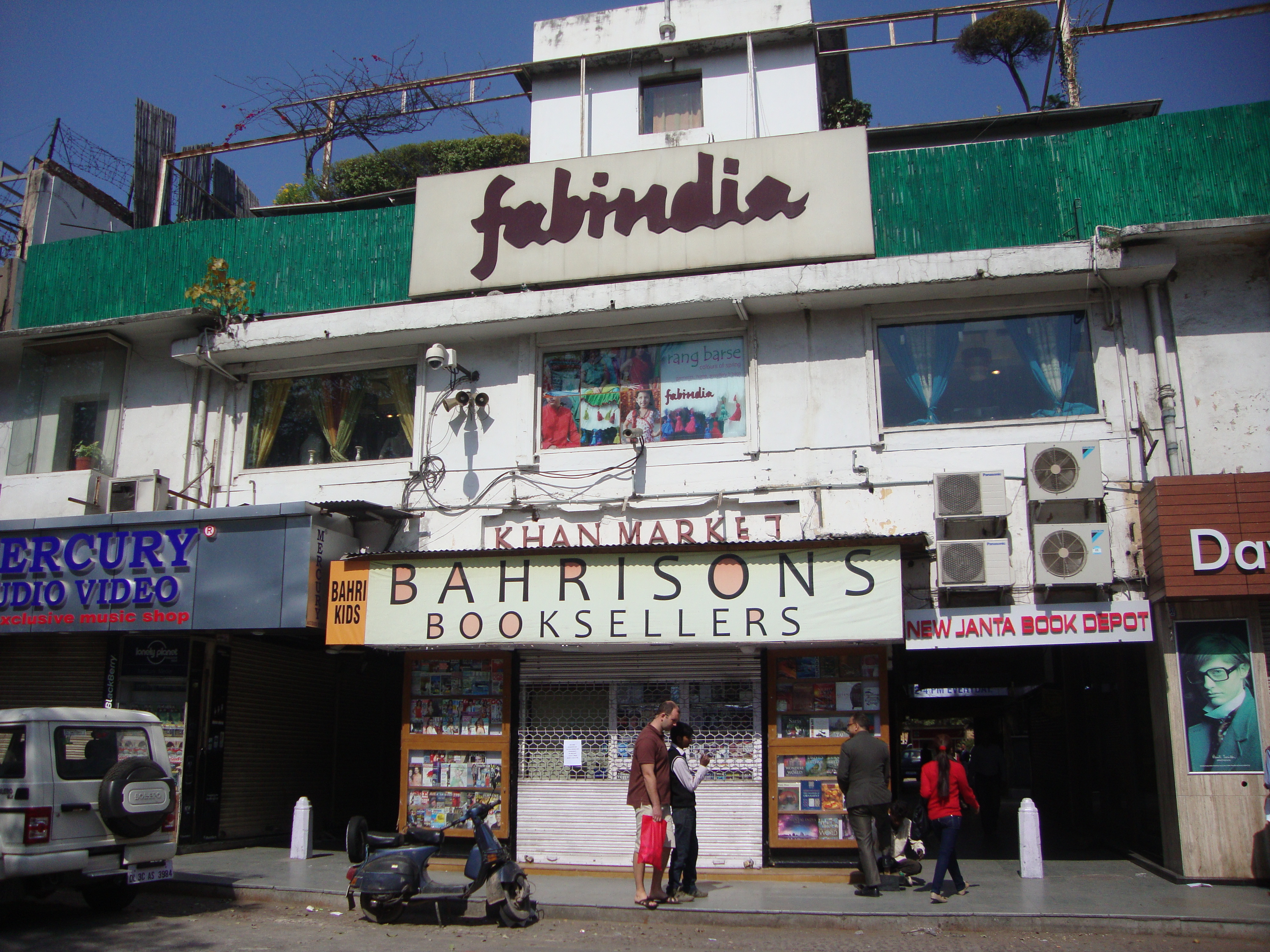
FabIndia outlet, Khan Market, New Delhi.

Khan Market is a shopping district and retail market in New Delhi, India. It was established in 1951 by the newly constituted Republic of India's Rehabilitation Ministry to give economic opportunities to refugees of the Partition of India, especially those from the North West Frontier Province (NWFP), now Khyber Pakhtunkhwa, a province in Pakistan. Many such refugees had arrived in the Delhi region. It is named after Khan Abdul Jabbar Khan, also known as Dr. Khan Sahib, who was the Chief Minister of NWFP from 1945 to 1947, and who had helped many refugees to escape without harm. Khan was the elder brother of the Pashtun- and Indian-freedom activist Khan Abdul Gaffar Khan ("Frontier Gandhi"). In 2019, Khan Market was rated as the world's 20th most expensive commercial street by Cushman & Wakefield.

== History ==
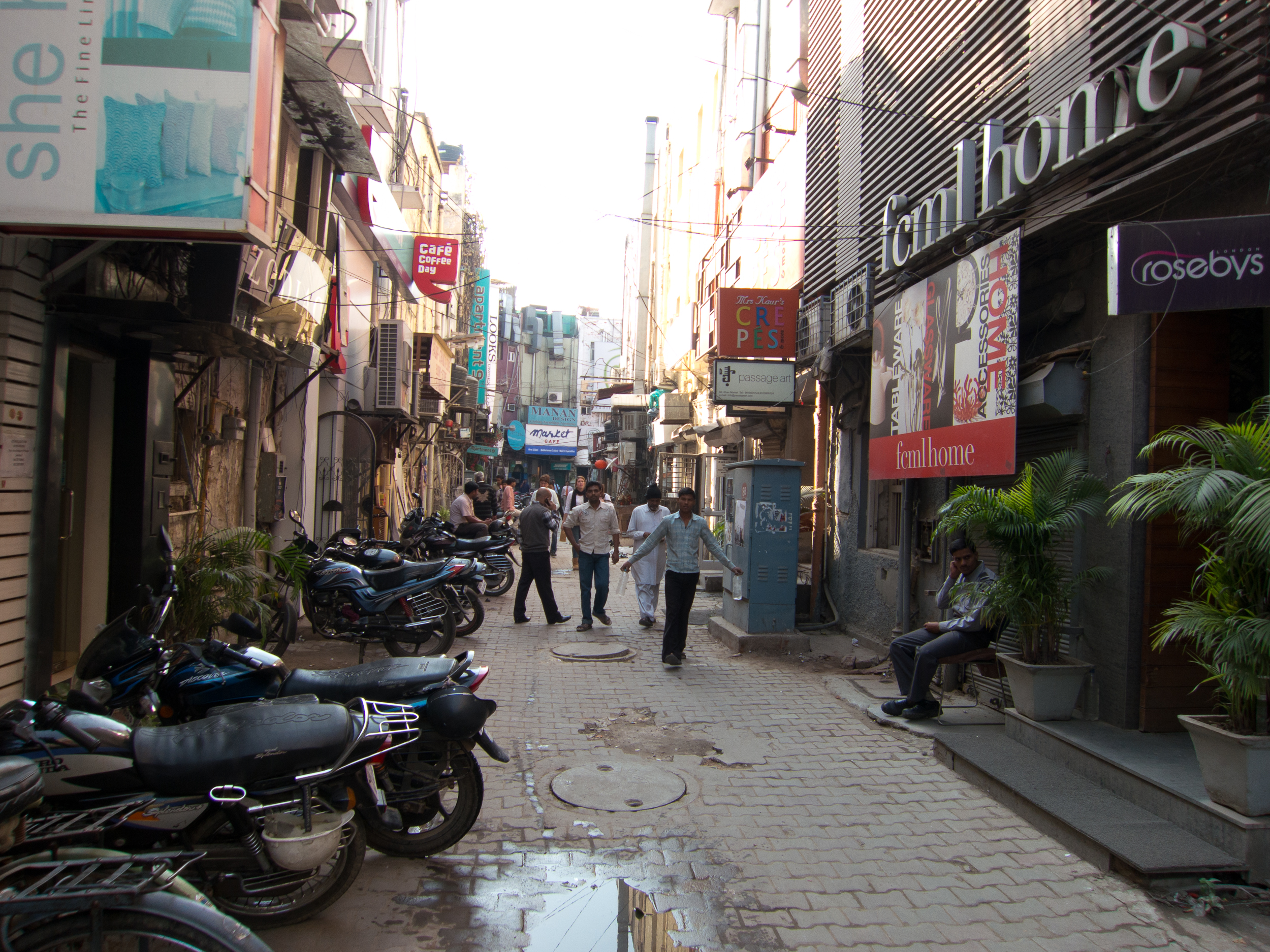
Middle lane, Khan Market started turning to commercial space in the 1990s.

Established in 1951, the U-shaped, double-storey market complex originally had 154 shops and 74 flats on the first floor for shopkeepers. Many of these shops were allocated as seed land to immigrants from the North-West Frontier Province after the partition of India, Khan Market is named in honor of Khan Abdul Jabbar Khan, a Pashtun political and spiritual leader.

Nearby is Sujan Singh Park, New Delhi's first apartment complex, built in 1945, and designed by Walter Sykes George and named after the grandfather of this enclave's most famous resident, writer Khushwant Singh. George also designed, the Ambassador Hotel next door, built in 1945 in a mix of British and Art Deco style. The building is now a heritage property and the hotel has been taken over by the Taj Vivanta chain.

Until the 1980s, all the flats on the first floor continued to serve as homes. Neighbourhood grocery stores and middle-class shops existed in the middle lane, despite the fact it catered most up to upmarket Golf Links, Sundar Nagar, and diplomatic crowd from Chanakyapuri. Gradually, the real estate boom and expanding families of the first generation of occupants forced many families to move out. Thus these homes were sold and started being converted into shops. By the 2010s, only a few families were living in these two-room flats.

A 2011 Cushman & Wakefield survey ranked Khan Market as the world's 21st most expensive shopping street.

== Overview ==
Khan Market is now among the most expensive commercial real estate locations in the city. It has a wide variety of stores, including showrooms for several well-known brands, jewellery stores, delicatessens, bookstores, hardware stores, and stores selling electronics, kitchenware, and fabric, alongside a number of restaurants.

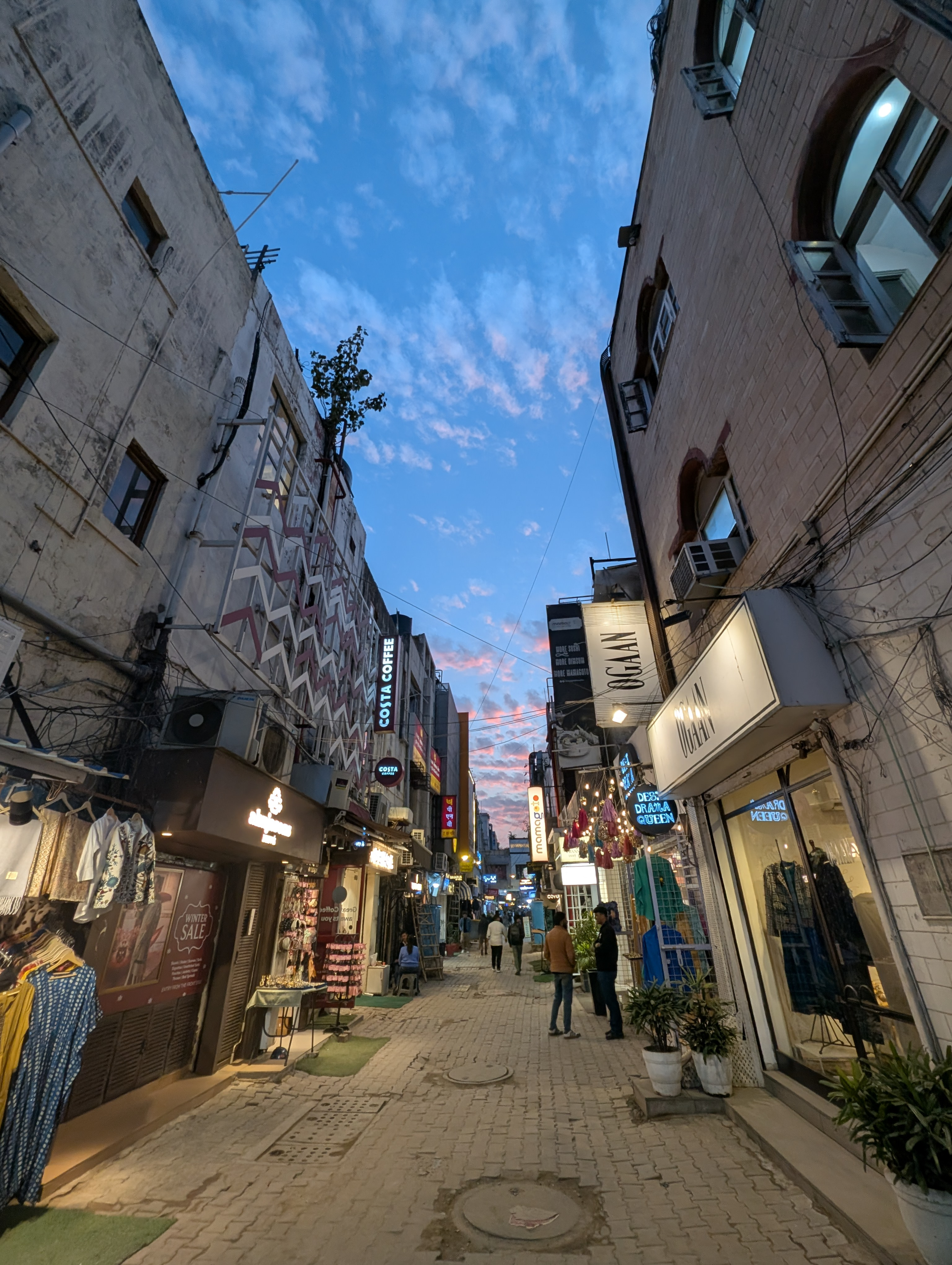
Khan Market at night with a beautiful sky

It is also famous for food including kebabs and gol guppe (a type of popular street food) and a retail market for lighting fixtures on the ground floor. There are several bookstores in the market

== Location ==
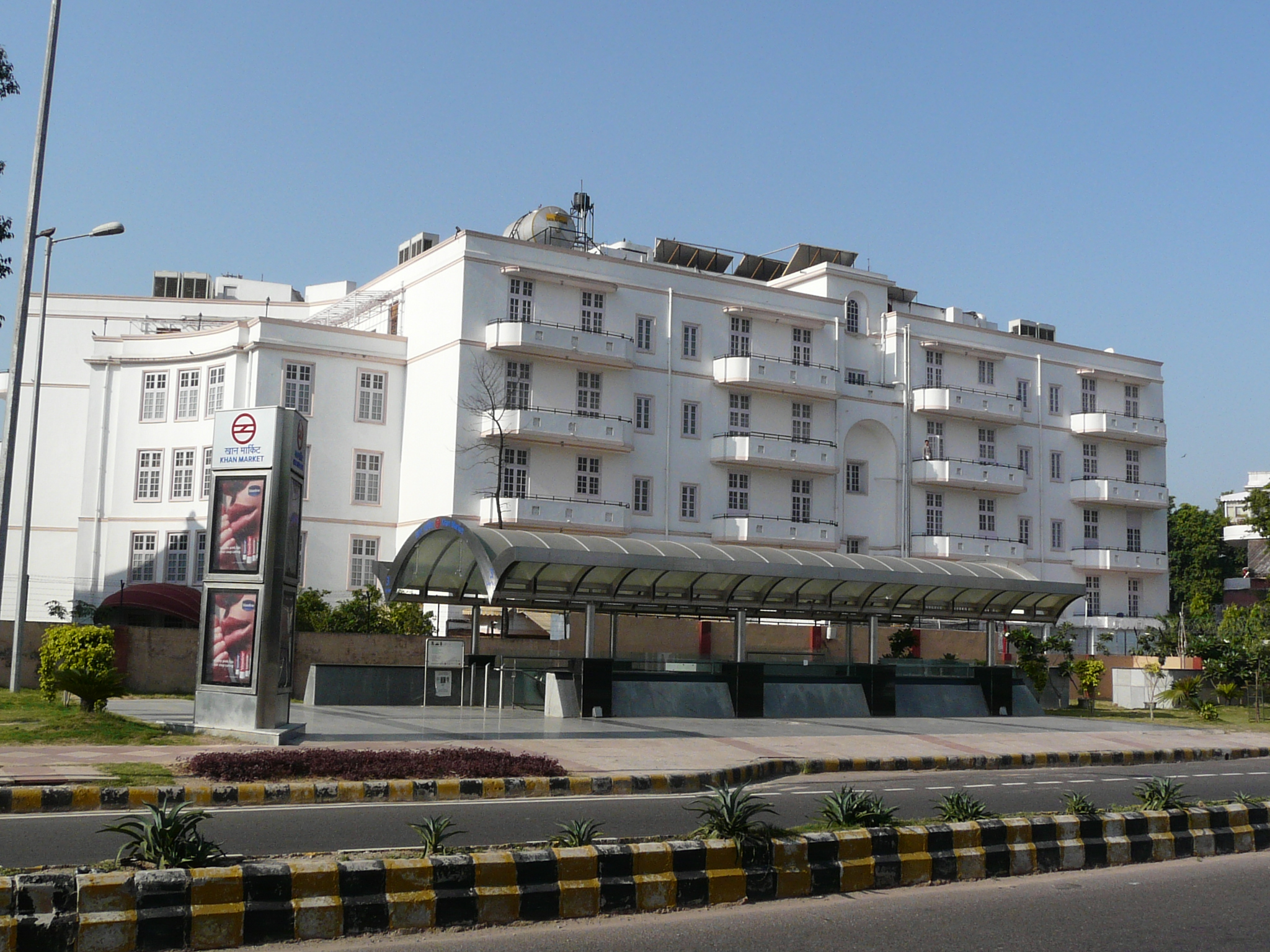
Khan Market Station entrance and Taj Vivanta Hotel, New Delhi.

Khan Market is almost in the heart of the city, close to India Gate. It is surrounded by residential complexes — government owned and private — including Golf Links, Lodi Estate, Shahjahan Road, Pandara Road, Rabindra Nagar and Sujan Singh Park. Its environs are home to a significant number of bureaucrats from the central government (including some MPs from both the houses), and famous people like the satirist Khushwant Singh. It is one of the greenest pockets of the city, very close to the famed Lodi Gardens. Also in proximity are the India International Centre, the India Habitat Centre, offices of the World Wide Fund for Nature, and other organizations. Nearby the Khan Market are popular schools such as Sardar Patel Vidyalaya and The Raghubir Singh Junior Modern School.

== Transport ==
It is serviced by the Khan Market underground station of the Delhi Metro (Violet Line), which lies in front of the Taj Vivanta Hotel. There are four exits of the metro station namely Gate 1, Gate 2, Gate 3 and Gate 4. The exit at Gate 4 leads to Khan Market.

== See also ==
- Arabber
- Bazaar
- Bazaari
- Hawker centre (Asia) a centre where street food is sold
- Market (place)
- Pan Bazaar
- Peddler
- Retail
- Street vendor
- Street food
