= Badalpura =

Town in Patna district, Bihar, India

- Town
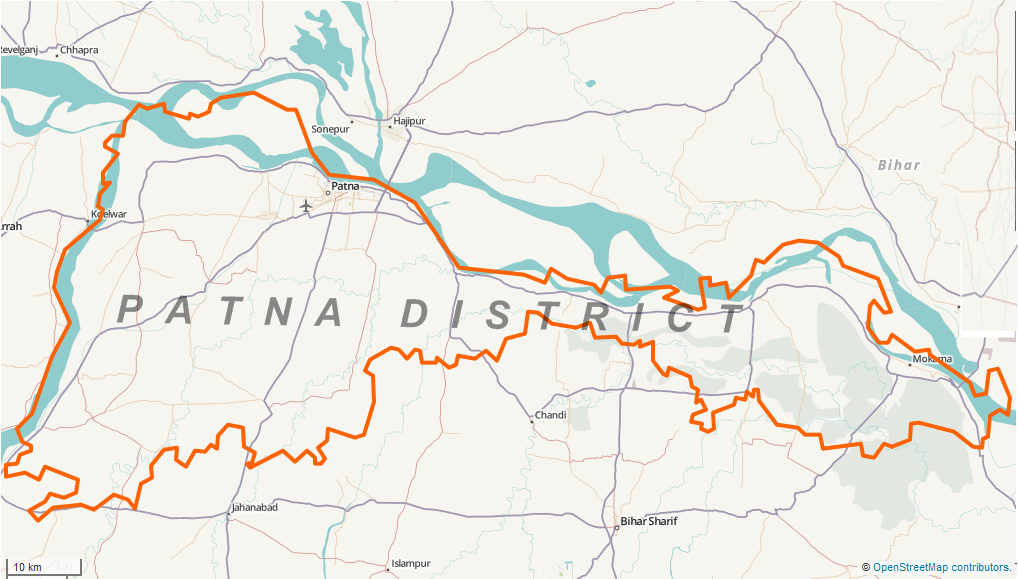
- Country: India
- State: Bihar
- Division: Patna division
- District: Patna district
- UA: Patna

Population (2011)
  - Total: 75
- Time zone: UTC+5:30 (IST)
- Website: patna.nic.in

Badalpura is a town in Patna district in the Indian state of Bihar. It is a part of Patna urban agglomeration. Badalpura has the lowest sex ratio in Bihar state (630 as against 1000 males) as per the 2011 census.
