= Sarita Vihar metro station =

Metro station in Delhi, India

Sarita Vihar

General information
- Location: Pocket C, Sarita Vihar, New Delhi, 110076
- Coordinates: 28°31′43″N 77°17′18″E
- System: Delhi Metro station
- Owner: Delhi Metro
- Operator: Delhi Metro Rail Corporation (DMRC)
- Line: Violet Line
- Platforms: Side platform; Platform-1 → Raja Nahar Singh (Ballabhgarh); Platform-2 → Kashmere Gate
- Tracks: 3

Construction
- Structure type: Elevated, Double-track
- Platform levels: 2
- Parking: Available
- Cycle facilities: Yes
- Accessible: Yes

Other information
- Status: Staffed, Operational
- Station code: STVR

History
- Opened: 3 October 2010; 15 years ago
- Electrified: 25 kV 50 Hz AC through overhead catenary

Passengers
- 2015: 9,123/day 282,823/ Month average

Services
Preceding station	Delhi Metro	Following station
Jasola Apollo towards Kashmere Gate	Violet Line	Mohan Estate towards Raja Nahar Singh (Ballabhgarh)
Route map
Location

Sarita Vihar is a Delhi Metro station in Delhi. It is located between Jasola Apollo and Mohan Estate stations on the Violet Line.

== History ==
The station was opened with the first section of the Line on 3 October 2010 in time for the Commonwealth Games opening ceremony on the same day. Until the second section of the Violet Line opened in 2011, it was the terminus for the line.

== The station ==
=== Station layout ===
L2	Side platform | Doors will open on the left
L2	Platform 1 Southbound	Towards → Raja Nahar Singh (Ballabhgarh); Next Station: Mohan Estate
L2	Platform 2 Northbound	Towards ← Kashmere Gate; Next Station: Jasola Apollo
L2	Side platform | Doors will open on the left
L1	Concourse	Fare control, station agent, Metro Card vending machines, crossover
G	Street Level	Exit/Entrance

=== Facilities ===
The station also houses several ATMs, food kiosks and a book store run by WHSmith. List of available ATM at Sarita Vihar metro station are HDFC Bank, YES Bank, Canara Bank nearest college is Asia Pacific Institute of Management

== Entry/Exit ==
Sarita Vihar metro station Entry/exits
Gate No-1	Gate No-2

== See also ==
- Delhi
- Sarita Vihar
- List of Delhi Metro stations
- Transport in Delhi
- Delhi Metro Rail Corporation
- Delhi Suburban Railway
- Delhi Monorail
- Delhi Transport Corporation
- South East Delhi
- New Delhi
- National Capital Region (India)
- List of rapid transit systems
- List of metro systems
