= Lajpat Nagar =

- Neighborhood of Delhi
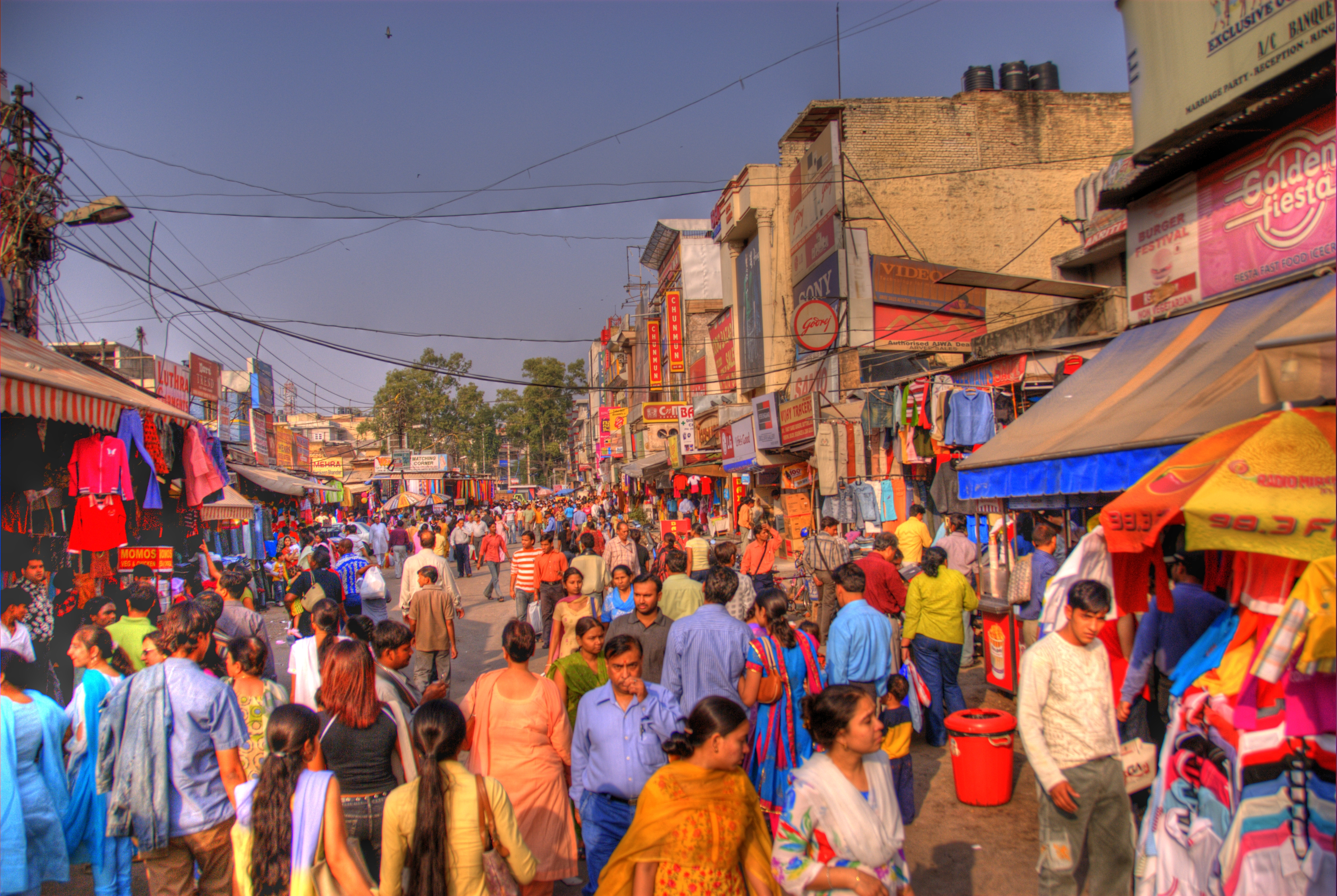

- Location in Delhi, India
- Coordinates: 28°34′05″N 77°14′30″E
- Country: India
- District: South East Delhi
- Time zone: GMT + 0530
- PIN Code: 110024
- Area code: 110024

Lajpat Nagar is a residential and commercial neighborhood in the South East Delhi district of Delhi. It was named in honor of Lala Lajpat Rai. This area is not to be confused with the Lajpat Nagar in Ghaziabad in the NCR region.

In the recent years, Lajpat Nagar has become a preferred residential neighborhood for tourists and certain refugees from various countries, including Afghanistan, who often travel to New Delhi as medical tourists, owing to the presence of affordable quality health care in the capital. It is common to see individuals from different parts of India and Afghanistan in this neighborhood.

== Overview ==
The area is divided into four parts: Lajpat Nagar I, II, III (north of the Ring Road) and IV (south of the Ring Road). Housing colonies like Amar Colony, Dayanand Colony, Double Storey (also known as Nirmal Puri), National Park and Vikram Vihar are also located in it. Lajpat Nagar is famous for its Central Market, a popular shopping destination, and also is known for the garments and textiles which are sold there.

The area falls partially under the Kasturba Nagar Constituency and part of it is in the South Delhi Lok Sabha constituency.

== History ==
Lajpat Nagar was developed in the 1950s and most of its early residents were Hindus and Sikhs moving east from newly formed Pakistan following the partition of India in 1947. As such, many of these individuals are Saraikis and Sindhis. One part of Lajpat Nagar IV (Dayanand Colony) was named after Maharishi Dayanand Saraswati, by Mr. B.N. Puri in 1957. The residential colony was built on the acquired village lands of Zamrudpur, which was historically a village of the Gurjar community.

Initially, refugee camps were set up in Purana Quila, and refugees were allotted plots in areas like Lajpat Nagar, Patel Nagar, Rajendra Nagar. The plots were of 15x60 feet constructed like army barracks. The houses were all single story, with asbestos roofs, in the beginning, but now most of the houses are multi-storeyed in this neighborhood.

The colony also housed a refugee camp for Bengali widows, during the Bangladesh Liberation War, known as Kasturba Ashram. In 1960, Servants of the People Society (founded by Lala Lajpat Rai in 1921 in Lahore) after functioning for many years since Partition of India, shifted from the residence of MP Lala Achint Ram to a new building known as Lajpat Bhawan.

The number of Afghan Indians, as well as Afghan students, workers and refugees, living there has resulted in the nickname of the locality, Afghan Nagar. The suburb has two Afghan "bakeries and three restaurants, and many guesthouses and apartments housing Afghan students, guests, medical refugees and asylum seekers." As such, Apollo Hospital in Delhi "has translators on staff, a website in Dari, and even a separate payment desk for Afghans." Most of the Afghanis in Lajpat Nagar speak Pashto or Dari. GK Vij, a resident of Lajpat Nagar, "whose father migrated after Partition and has spent his whole life in the area," states that though people "enjoy the big 'naan bread' which Afghans prepare, the rising number of Afghan restaurants has overshadowed the indigenous Punjabi cuisine to some extent."

== Accessibility ==
Lajpat Nagar is well connected by Delhi Transport Corporation bus services and the Delhi Mass Rapid Transit System. Route number 543 connects Anand Vihar in East Delhi to Lajpat Nagar, and Teevr Mudrika connects Lajpat Nagar to Rohini in North Delhi and Punjabi Bagh in West Delhi. The Lajpat Nagar Station of the Delhi Metro has elevated platforms lying on Delhi Metro's Violet Line and underground platforms on Delhi Metro's Pink Line. The station was opened to the public in 2010 along with the first section of the Violet Line. An underpass connection was opened in 2014 below the Defence Colony-Lajpat Nagar flyover between Lajpat Nagar and Jangpura for easy access to areas like Jangpura Extension, Bhogal, and Nizamuddin. The area is also connected to the Delhi Suburban Railway with the Lajpat Nagar railway station

The nearest metro station to Lajpat Nagar Central Market is Lajpat Nagar. When exiting from Gate no. 5, it is located at a distance of around 1 km (10 minutes walk).

The average daily footfall in the Lajpat Nagar market is around 10,000 people. The crowd can get a little bigger on weekends.

== Popular culture ==
Lajpat Nagar is home to a large Punjabi community that is featured in multiple movies.

- In the film Do Dooni Chaar (2010), directed by Habib Faisal, the Duggal family house is located in Vinoba Puri, Lajpat Nagar.
- Portions of the film Oye Lucky! Lucky Oye! (2008), directed by Dibakar Banerjee, were filmed in Lajpat Nagar.
- In the film Cocktail (2012 film), the character Kavita Kapoor, played by Dimple Kapadia, is from Lajpat Nagar.
- Vicky Donor (2012 film), directed by Shoojit Sircar, was based out of Lajpat Nagar.
- In Buniyaad, a television series based on Partition of India. The lead gets house in claim in Lajpat Nagar.
