= Jawaharlal Nehru Stadium metro station =

Metro station in Delhi, India

Jawaharlal Nehru Stadium

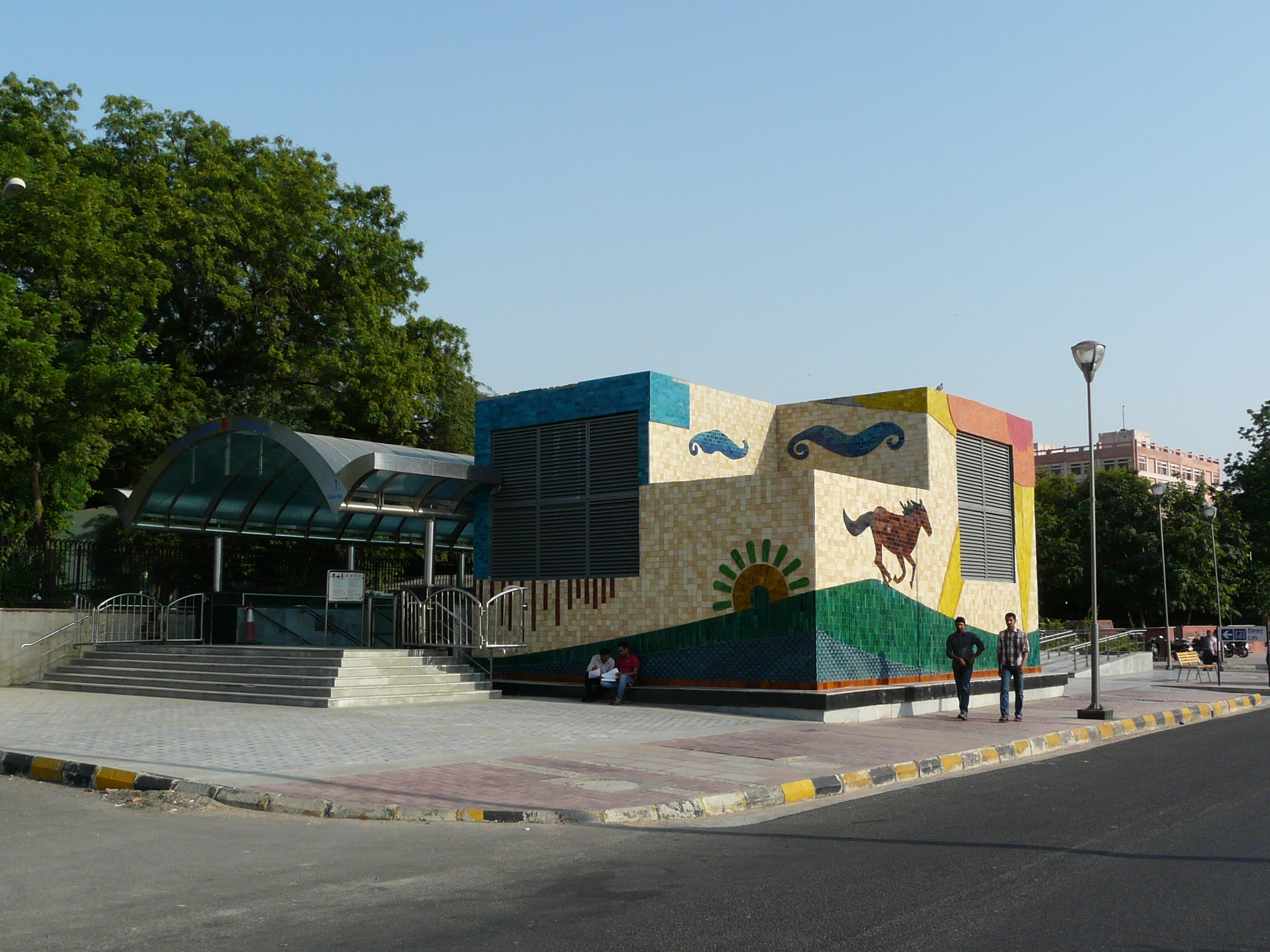

General information
- Location: Pragati Vihar, New Delhi, 110003
- Coordinates: 28°35′25″N 77°13′59″E
- System: Delhi Metro station
- Owner: Delhi Metro
- Line: Violet Line
- Platforms: Island platform; Platform-1 → Raja Nahar Singh (Ballabhgarh); Platform-2 → Kashmere Gate
- Tracks: 2

Construction
- Structure type: Underground
- Accessible: Yes

Other information
- Station code: JLNS

History
- Opened: 3 October 2010; 16 years ago
- Electrified: 25 kV 50 Hz AC through overhead catenary

Services
Preceding station	Delhi Metro	Following station
Khan Market towards Kashmere Gate	Violet Line	Jangpura towards Raja Nahar Singh (Ballabhgarh)
Route map
Location

Jawaharlal Nehru Stadium is an underground metro station on the Violet Line of the Delhi Metro, located in South Delhi. As its name suggests, the station primarily serves the Jawaharlal Nehru Stadium and its surrounding areas. It commenced passenger operations on 3 October 2010, a few hours before the opening ceremony of the 2010 Commonwealth Games, which was held at the stadium.

== Station layout ==
G	Street level	Exit/Entrance
C	Concourse	Fare control, station agent, Ticket/token, shops
P	Platform 1 Southbound	Towards → Raja Nahar Singh (Ballabhgarh); Next Station: Jangpura
P	Island platform | Doors will open on the right
P	Platform 2 Northbound	Towards ← Kashmere Gate; Next Station: Khan Market

== See also ==
- List of Delhi Metro stations
- Transport in Delhi
- Delhi Metro Rail Corporation
- Delhi Suburban Railway
