= Badalpur, Jaunpur district =

Badalpur
- Interactive map of Badalpur
- Country: India
- State: Uttar Pradesh
- District: Jaunpur

Population (2001)
  - Total: 2,000
- Time zone: UTC+5:30 (India)

Badalpur is a village in Jaunpur district in the state of Uttar Pradesh, in Northern India. At the time of the 2001 census it had a population of 2,000 and included 250 houses. Badlapur is like a Tahasil. There are many villages included such as Ghanshyampur, Khalispur, Leduka etc.
