= Jangpura metro station =

Metro station in Delhi, India

Jangpura

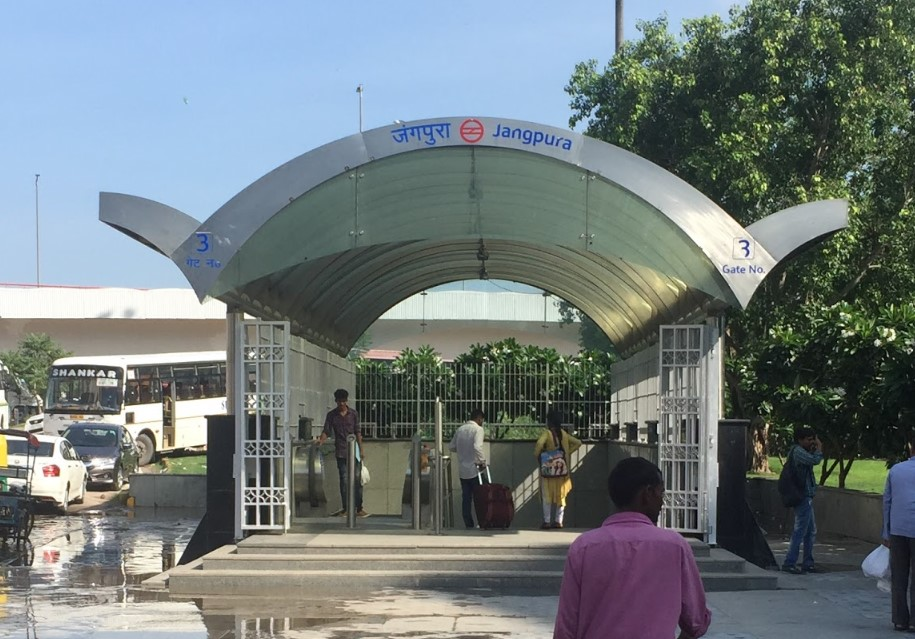

General information
- Location: Shri Kuldeep Singh Gujral Marg, New Delhi, India
- Coordinates: 28°35′00″N 77°14′23″E
- System: Delhi Metro station
- Owner: Delhi Metro
- Line: Violet Line
- Platforms: Island platform; Platform-1 → Raja Nahar Singh (Ballabhgarh); Platform-2 → Kashmere Gate
- Tracks: 2

Construction
- Structure type: Underground
- Platform levels: 2
- Accessible: Yes

Other information
- Station code: JGPA

History
- Opened: 3 October 2010; 15 years ago
- Electrified: 25 kV 50 Hz AC through overhead catenary

Passengers
- 200,843: 6,479 (As of Jan 2015)

Services
Preceding station	Delhi Metro	Following station
Jawaharlal Nehru Stadium towards Kashmere Gate	Violet Line	Lajpat Nagar towards Raja Nahar Singh (Ballabhgarh)
Route map
Location

Jangpura is a Delhi Metro station in Delhi. It is located between JLN Stadium and Lajpat Nagar stations on the Violet Line in Jangpura locality. The station was opened with the first section of the Line on 3 October 2010, in time for the Commonwealth Games opening ceremony on the same day.

== Station layout ==
G	Street Level	Exit/ Entrance
C	Concourse	Fare control, station agent, Ticket/token, shops
P	Platform 1 Southbound	Towards → Raja Nahar Singh (Ballabhgarh); Next Station: Lajpat Nagar Change at the next station for Pink Line
P	Island platform | Doors will open on the right
P	Platform 2 Northbound	Towards ← Kashmere Gate; Next Station: Jawaharlal Nehru Stadium

== Facilities ==
ATMs are available at Jangpura metro station.

== Landmarks ==
- Near AddtoGoogle Services (A Unit of SNZ Networks Pvt Ltd.)

== See also ==
- List of Delhi Metro stations
- Transport in Delhi
- Delhi Metro Rail Corporation
- Delhi Suburban Railway
