= Tigri, Delhi =

Tigri
- census town
- Location in India
- Coordinates: 28°30′N 77°14.21′E
- Country: India
- State: Delhi
- District: South

Population (2001)
  - Total: 44,895

Languages
  - Official: Hindi, English,
- Time zone: UTC+5:30 (IST)
- PIN: 244235

Tigri is a census town, near Khanpur in South district in the National Capital Territory of Delhi, India.

In 2012 Arwind Kejriwal Launched a 'Bijli-Paani Satyagraha' (protest against the tariff hike of electricity and water), Kejriwal-led India Against Corruption (IAC) 'restored' power supply to a laborer's house in south Delhi's Tigri.

== Demographics ==
At the 2001 India census, Tigri had a population of 44,895. Males constitute 55% of the population and females 45%. Tigri has an average literacy rate of 62%, higher than the national average of 59.5%: male literacy is 70%, and female literacy is 51%. In Tigri, 17% of the population is under 6 years of age.
