= Thoha Khalsa =

Thoha Khalsa تھوہا خالصا
- Village
- Location within Pakistan
- Coordinates: 33.31°N 73.26°E
- Country: Pakistan
- Province: Punjab
- District: Rawalpindi
- Tehsil: Kahuta
- Elevation: 700 m (2,300 ft)
- Time zone: UTC+5 (PST)

Thoha Khalsa (Punjabi, Urdu: تھوہا خالصا) is a village in Kahuta Tehsil, Rawalpindi District in Punjab Province of Pakistan.

== Geography ==
It is located at 33°31'0N 73°25'60E at an altitude of 700 metres (2299 feet) and lies north of the city of Kahuta.

== History ==
Thoha Khalsa is a village in Kahuta Tehsil, Rawalpindi District, Punjab. The village is located in the South East of Rawalpindi city at the distance of 45 kilometers. The population is about 20,000 consisting different tribes named Janjua, Gakhars, Mirza, Bhati and few others. It is an historical village and was established by the Sikhs in early 19th Century.

In 1947, during the course of the Partition of India, Muslim mobs from neighbouring villages attacked this village, looted, raped and forced local Sikh women to convert to Islam. This barbaric attack set in motion the mass killing spree in whole Punjab. Many Sikh women chose to drown themselves in a well in an act of mass suicide.

== Historical importance ==
Avtar Singh Vahiria was a famous polemicist and scholar of Sikh community, He was born on 12 June 1848 at Thoha Khalsa. As a small boy, he learnt to recite the Sikh psalms from his mother and maternal uncle, Prem Singh. After he had learnt Gurmukhi his own village Thoha Khalsa, he moved towards Rawalpindi city for further education.

Nihal Singh Saint also known as Pandit Nihal Singh, a Sanskrit scholar well versed in the Vedas as well as in Gurbani and Ardās. In 1870 Sant Pandit Nihal Singh set out on a pilgrimage to various Hindu and Sikh holy places, where he preached the Sikh faith through kirtan. In 1874 he moved to Thoha Khalsa, where he established a dera called Dukh Bhanjani. He continued his kirtan recitals and Sikh missionary work till the end. Sant Avtar Singh is said to have frequently attended these recitals at Thoha Khalsa. Baba Khem Singh Bedi once took him on a preaching tour to Thoha Khalsa.

== See also ==
- Choa Khalsa
- Dera Khalsa
- Sikhism in Pakistan
