= Maharani Bagh =

Neighborhood in South East Delhi, Delhi, India

- Neighborhood of Delhi
- Location in Delhi, India
- Coordinates: 28.573538°N 77.262638°E
- Country: India
- State: Delhi
- District: South East Delhi

Languages
  - Official: Hindi
- Time zone: UTC+5:30 (IST)
- PIN: 110 014
- Planning agency: Municipal Corporation of Delhi

Maharani Bagh is a residential area in South East Delhi, comprising several blocks and multiple markets. It is one of the most posh and upscale neighbourhoods of Delhi and is home to some of the most influential families from government and business. Maharani Bagh is a sought after, gated residential area within New Friends Colony and consists of residential parks surrounded by large bungalows. Some of its notable residents include BJP leader Meneka Gandhi and, spokesperson and businessman, Suhel Seth.

== Nearby ==
- Jamia Millia Islamia
- New Friends Colony
- Ashram chowk
- Jeewan Nagar
- Kilokari
