= Badarpur, Gujarat =

Badarpur
- Village
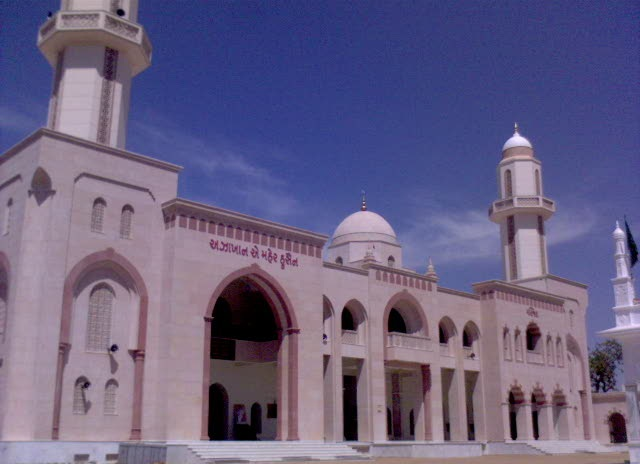
- Badarpur Masjid: AzhaKhan-e-Maher Hussain
- Interactive map of Badarpur
- Country: India
- State: Gujarat
- District: Mehsana

Government
  - Body: Panchayat

Population (2010)
  - Total: 7,000

Languages
  - Official: Gujarati
- Time zone: UTC+5:30 (IST)
- PIN: 384355
- Telephone code: 91(0)- 2761- XXX XXX
- Vehicle registration: GJ
- Website: gujaratindia.com

Badarpur is a small village nearby the Vadnagar city in Mehsana district, in the Indian state of Gujarat. Mehsana district comprises nine talukas. These are Becharaji, Kadi, Kheralu, Mahesana, Vadnagar, Vijapur, Visnagar, Satlasana and Unjha.

== History ==
As per the news source, Badarpur village mosque or masjid (Islamic name- AzhaKhan-e-Maher Hussain) is one of the good looking masjid of the entire Gujarat state. The great masjid took 5 years in its construction.

== Demographics ==
All the villagers are Shia Muslims. Current population of Badarpur in 2015 is around 5000.

== Education ==
Education in Badarpur mainly provide by the public sector as well as private sector. Badarpur is trying to progress in terms of increasing primary education attendance rate and higher education of all field.

Badarpur has English medium school named "Wisdom English School" which maintained by Maher Education & Welfare Trust. Currently the school is offering education up to 8th standard.

== Economy ==
=== Agriculture ===
Badarpur village farmers mainly produce the Fennel, Cotton and Castor. Other major food crops produced are Wheat, Jowar, Bajra and Maize. Animal husbandry (पशुपालन) and dairying have played a vital role in the rural economy of Badarpur. Gujarat is the largest producer of milk in India.

== Historical places ==
In Badarpur there are various historical places are located to visit, AzhaKhan-e-Mehar Hussain(as) (masjid), Imam Hussain(as) Dargah, Abbas Alamdar(as) Dargah, Bagicha Dargah, Hajar Peer Bawa urf Gulam Ali Bawa Dargah and Kadme Sayyed Dargah.
