= Dayanand Colony =

- Neighborhood of Delhi
- Location in Delhi, India
- Coordinates: 28.5625°N 77.2484°E
- Country: India
- State: Delhi
- District: South Delhi

Government
  - Body: Municipal Corporation Of Delhi

Languages
  - Official: Hindi, English
- Time zone: UTC+5:30 (IST)
- PIN: 110024
- Nearest city: VASANT ENCLAVE, New Delhi, Old Faridabad
- Lok Sabha constituency: New Delhi
- Civic agency: MCD

Dayanand Colony is part of the Lajpat Nagar area of Delhi. It falls under Lajpat Nagar-4 in South Delhi. By 1957, it was named after Dayanand Saraswati. The area is mostly occupied by Punjabis, Sidhis and Multani migrants from Pakistan. It has the largest wholesale market for ladies suits and saris in Delhi and numerous food outlets.
