= Badarpur, Delhi =

Badarpur
- town
- Nickname: Badarpur Border
- Location in Delhi City, India
- Coordinates: 28.5167°N 77.3333°E
- Country: India
- State: Delhi
- District: South East Delhi
- Established: 01/02/1987

Government
  - Type: Government of Delhi
  - Body: MCD
- Elevation: 191 m (627 ft)
  - Rank: 50000-80000
- Demonym: Delhite

Languages
  - Official: HindiEnglish
- Time zone: UTC+5:30 (IST)
- PIN: 110044
- Vehicle registration: DL 3
- Lok Sabha constituency: South Delhi
- Vidhan Sabha constituency: Badarpur
- Civic agency: Delhi Municipal Corporation (MCD)

Badarpur is a historical town situated in the South East Delhi district of National Capital Territory of Delhi, India. The area of Badarpur encompasses both an NTPC thermal power station and an ancient village known as Badarpur village.

Earlier, the area was primarily known only for being located on the periphery of Delhi and having the Main border line between Delhi and Faridabad that line was created as the interstate Border for separation of Jurisdiction of Delhi and Haryana before the creation of Delhi NCR region but today, however, it is growing famous also for having Asia's largest ecological park. Providing the much-needed connectivity between Delhi, Noida and Faridabad with the metro, bus terminals, and the DND-KMP Expressway it has become the most conjusted area of Delhi covering Very small Area of NCT New Delhi .

A significant portion of Badarpur is under the administration and development of the Municipal Corporation of Delhi, as a substantial segment falls within the 'O' Zone of the Delhi Development Authority. The 'O' Zone designation restricts construction activities in this area. Political figures such as Ramvir Singh Bidhuri, the current MLA of Badarpur and Leader of the Opposition in Delhi, are actively working towards the removal of the 'O' Zone classification to promote the area's infrastructural development. The toll booth at the border between the National Capital Territory of Delhi and the state of Haryana is referred to as the Badarpur Border. On the Haryana side of the border, buses and vehicles proceed towards Southern Haryana and Western Uttar Pradesh. The metro and bus station at Badarpur have been renamed by the Government of the National Capital Territory of Delhi as Badarpur Border.

Situated along Mathura Road, which connects Delhi with Mathura and Agra, Badarpur is a key point on NH 2, also known as the Delhi-Kolkathway. NH 2 forms a part of the historic Grand Trunk Road, which once linked Bengal to Kabul. It marks the starting point of the "Mehrauli-Badarpur Road", a route that passes through locations like Tughlaqabad, Khanpur, Tigri, and Saket before reaching Mehrauli. Additionally, the Delhi Faridabad Skyway, an elevated highway, commences at the beginning of the Mehrauli-Badarpur Road.

Notably, Badarpur is home to the Badarpur Thermal Power Station (BTPS) operated by the National Thermal Power Corporation (NTPC). The power station was inaugurated in 1973 and serves as a crucial source of power for districts such as South Delhi, South East Delhi, and East Delhi.

== Overview ==
Badarpur is a locality situated in the southern part of South East Delhi district, within the larger metropolis of Delhi, India. It enjoys well-established connectivity to New Delhi and Central Delhi through the prominent Mathura Road and Mehrauli, as well as to various regions within the southern part of Delhi through the Mehrauli-Badarpur Road (MB road). Additionally, it is strategically linked to Faridabad in the south via the Delhi-Faridabad Skyway and to Noida via Road 13 A near Sarita Vihar.

The road that now goes by the name Mehrauli-Badarpur Road is a significant albeit congested route connecting Badarpur in southeast Delhi to Mehrauli in the southern part of the city. The original village of Badarpur is situated to the west of the Meethapur-Kalindi Kunj road, which traverses from Aali village to the north down to Meethapur village in the south include Jaitpur.

Badarpur encompasses several constituent areas including Molar Band and Molarband Extension. Its vicinity includes Pul Prahladpur to the south of the Mehrauli-Badarpur road, Lal Kuan located between Tughluqabad and Pul Prahladpur, Tughluqabad Extension, Railway Colony to the southwest, Tughluqabad and Okhla Phase 1 to the west, and Saidabad, Madanpur Khadar Village, Ali Extension, and Aali village to the north and northeast. Further adjoining areas consist of Jaitpur and Meethapur on the eastern side. Notable neighborhoods within close proximity are Jasola, Surajkund, and Tughlaqabad. To the east of Badarpur, there are smaller blocks including Anand Vihar, Saraswati Vihar, Ekta Vihar, Harsh Vihar, Shakti Vihar, and Roop Nagar. Notably, the upmarket development known as Badarpur Main Market also lies in this vicinity.

Expanding further eastward, Madanpur Khadar, a village situated within the river bed of Yamuna, supports a population of approximately 1100 residents and encompasses 560 eligible voters.

Badarpur (Delhi) should not be confused with Badalpur (Uttar Pradesh), which is the ancestral village of former Chief Minister Mayawati.

== Education ==
The National Power Training Institute (NPTI) for North India Region under Ministry of Power, Government of India was established at Badarpur in 1974, within the Badarpur Thermal Power Station (BTPS) complex. Kendriya Vidyalaya NTPC and Notre Dame School is also situated with NTPC campus.

Earlier the NPTI was known as PETS (Power engineering Training Society)

== Administration ==
It is part of the Sarita Vihar sub-district (sub-division) of South East Delhi district.

== Politics ==
It is a constituency of the Legislative Assembly of Delhi, part of the South Delhi Lok Sabha, prior to it Badarpur. After the Delhi state assembly elections, Current MLA is Ramvir Singh Bidhuri from BJP.

== Transport ==
Old Districts of Delhi, with Badarpur in the (formerly) South Delhi district.

Badarpur is situated on National Highway 2 (Mathura Road). Delhi Transport Corporation (DTC) and Cluster buses ply to Badarpur Border bus terminal from Old Delhi Railway Station, New Delhi Railway Station, ISBT and other places.

DTC and Haryana Roadways buses going to Faridabad and Ballabgarh from Inter state Bus Terminal (ISBT) stop at BTPS Complex. DTC and Cluster Buses of Route No. 405A, 405, 415, 418A, 460, 473 & 479 ply to Badarpur, and are usually crowded, even over-crowded in peak hours. Buses are also available from Faridabad, right across the Toll plaza on the Delhi Haryana border.

The Badarpur elevated station of Delhi Metro on the Violet line opened on 14 January 2011, along with two preceding elevated stations, Mohan Estate, and Tughlakabad, which extended the line beyond Sarita Vihar. An extension southwards till Escorts Mujesar in Faridabad was inaugurated by Prime Minister Narendra Modi on 6 September 2015. Metro trains ply alternately to Badarpur (usually from ITO) or to Escorts Mujesar in Faridabad.

The Delhi Faridabad Skyway, a 4.4 km elevated highway, started construction after 2008, and was opened in late 2010. It passed over five important traffic junctions including NTPC, Mehrauli-Badarpur Road, Jaitpur in NCT Delhi and Bypasd Sector 37 and Sarai in Faridabad. Situated at the road junction of Mehrauli-Badarpur Road, which has become increasingly congested over the years, as it lies off highway NH 2 which carries major traffic to important cities of North India.

Within Badarpur, there are autos, usually shared autos, and cycle rickshaws available. Many people in Badarpur also walk to the Metro station or bus stops on the main road.
