= Escorts Mujesar metro station =

Metro station in Delhi, India

Escorts Mujesar

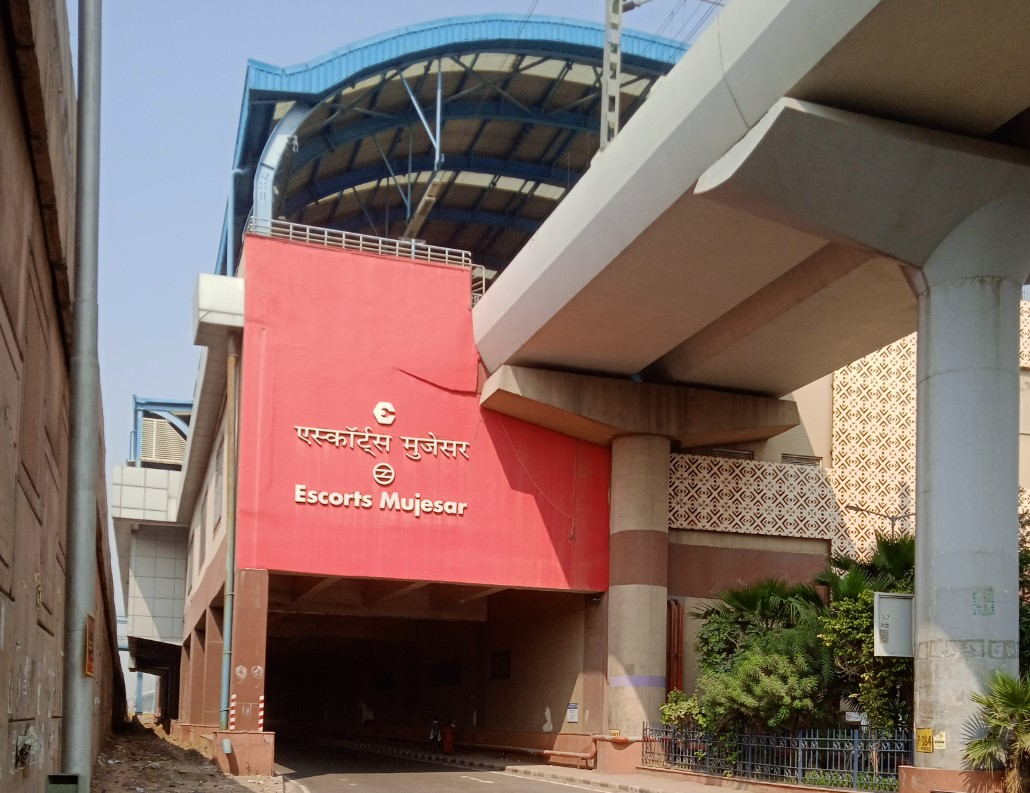

General information
- Location: Mathura Rd, Pocket A, Sector 11, Faridabad, Haryana 121006; India
- Coordinates: 28°22′12″N 77°18′54″E
- System: Delhi Metro station
- Owner: Delhi Metro
- Operator: Delhi Metro Rail Corporation (DMRC)
- Line: Violet Line
- Platforms: Side platform; Platform-1 → Raja Nahar Singh (Ballabhgarh); Platform-2 → Kashmere Gate
- Tracks: 2

Construction
- Structure type: Elevated, Double-track
- Platform levels: 2
- Parking: Available
- Accessible: Yes

Other information
- Status: Staffed, Operational
- Station code: ECMJ

History
- Opened: 6 September 2015; 10 years ago
- Electrified: 25 kV 50 Hz AC through overhead catenary

Services
Preceding station	Delhi Metro	Following station
Bata Chowk towards Kashmere Gate	Violet Line	Sant Surdas (Sihi) towards Raja Nahar Singh (Ballabhgarh)
Route map
Location

Escorts Mujesar is an elevated station on the Violet Line of the Delhi Metro. It is located after Bata Chowk station located in Faridabad, as of 6 September 2015.

== Station layout ==
L2	Side platform | Doors will open on the left
L2	Platform 1 Southbound	Towards → Raja Nahar Singh (Ballabhgarh); Next Station: Sant Surdas (Sihi)
L2	Platform 2 Northbound	Towards ← Kashmere Gate; Next Station: Bata Chowk
L2	Side platform | Doors will open on the left
L1	Concourse	Fare control, station agent, Metro Card vending machines, crossover
G	Street Level	Exit/Entrance

== Entry/Exit ==
Escorts Mujesar metro station Entry/exits
Gate No-1	Gate No-2	Gate No-3

== See also ==
- Delhi
- Faridabad
- Haryana
- National Highway 44 (India)
- List of Delhi Metro stations
- Transport in Delhi
- Delhi Metro Rail Corporation
- Delhi Suburban Railway
- Delhi Monorail
- Delhi Transport Corporation
- Faridabad district
- New Delhi
- National Capital Region (India)
- National Capital Region Transport Corporation
- List of rapid transit systems
- List of metro systems
