= Badalpur, Gautam Buddh Nagar =

Badalpur
- town/village
- Location in Uttar Pradesh, India Badalpur (India)
- Coordinates: 28.591010°N 77.518613°E
- Country: India
- State: Uttar Pradesh
- District: Gautam Buddha Nagar
- Elevation: 191 m (627 ft)

Languages
  - Official: Hindi
- Time zone: UTC+5:30 (IST)
- Postal code: 203207
- Vehicle registration: UP UP16
- Website: up.gov.in

Badalpur is a Nagar(Gurjar) village of 24 Naagar khap along with Dujana, Kachera, Achheja, Dairy Machha, Sadullapur, Vaidpura located in the Gautam Budh Nagar district of Uttar Pradesh. It is part of Bisrakh Block and Dadri Tehsil. The village is the native place of former Uttar Pradesh Chief Minister, Mayawati.

== Geography ==
Badalpur village is located in Dadri Tehsil of Gautam Buddha Nagar district in Uttar Pradesh, India. It is situated 5 km away from sub-district headquarter Dadri and 16 km away from district headquarter Gautam Buddha Nagar. Badalpur is the gram panchayat. The total geographical area of the village is 313.61 hectares.

== Education ==
=== Colleges ===
- Km. Mayawati Government Girls P.G. College
- Km. Mayawati Govt. Girls Polytechnic
- Km. Mayawati ITI

=== Secondary schools ===
- Km. Mayawati Government Girls Inter College
- Dujana Public School
- M.H. Public School
- Blue Diamond Public School
- Mother Teresa

== Parks ==
- Dr. Bhim Rao Ambedkar Park
- Village Park with open gym and track.

== Temples ==
- Jai Baba Surajkund Temple and Committee
- Jai Kheda Devta and committee
- Har Har Mahadev Temple

== Notable people ==
- Village is ancestral village of former CM Mayawati. And Village is very popular in U.P. Mostly Gurjar community live there .
- SDO Mr Rohit Nagar S/o Shri Dalveer Singh prepare map of badalpur.
