= South East Delhi district =

- District of Delhi
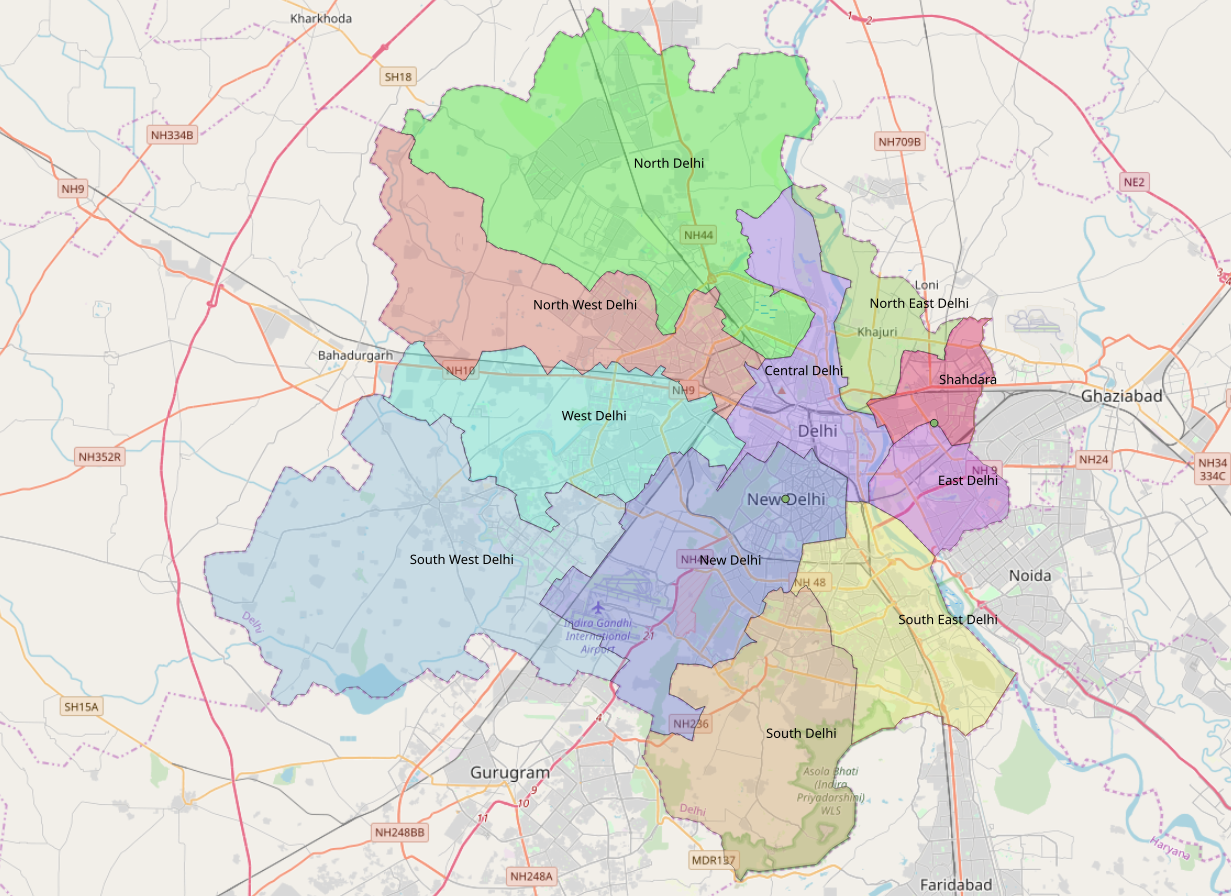
- Location in Delhi, India
- Coordinates: 28.5531°N 77.2599°E
- Country: India
- Union Territory: Delhi
- Division: Delhi division
- Created: 2012
- Headquarters: Jangpura Tehsil, Old Gargi College Campus, Lajpat Nagar IV, New Delhi 110024
- Subdivisions: Tehsils: Jangpura Sarita Vihar Kalkaji

Government
  - District collector: Dr. Shravan Bagaria, IAS

Area
  - Total: 102 km^{2} (39 sq mi)

Population (2011)
  - Total: 1,500,636
  - Density: 14,700/km^{2} (38,100/sq mi)

Languages
  - Official: Hindi, English
- Time zone: UTC+5:30 (IST)
- PIN: 1100xx
- Vehicle registration: DL
- Lok Sabha constituencies: South Delhi, New Delhi and East Delhi
- Civic agency: Delhi Municipal Corporation
- Website: Official website

South East Delhi district is an administrative district of the National Capital Territory of Delhi in India.

This district was carved out in 2012 along with Shahdara, taking the total number to 11 administrative districts in Delhi.

== Geography ==
The South East Delhi district is bordered in west by South Delhi district, in south by the Faridabad district of Haryana, in east by River Yamuna, and by New Delhi district and East Delhi district in north-west and north-east respectively.

The district stretches from Jor Bagh, Lodi Road, Khan Market, Sunder Nagar, Jangpura, Nizamuddin East, Nizamuddin West, Sarai Kale Khan, through Defence Colony, Lajpat Nagar, Ashram, Ashram chowk,New Friends Colony, Nehru Place, Kalkaji, Chittaranjan Park, Govindpuri, Greater Kailash, Alaknanda to Jamia Nagar, Okhla, Sarita Vihar, Jaitpur, Badarpur and Badarpur border.

== Administration ==
Administratively, the district is divided into three subdivisions, Jangpura, Kalkaji and Sarita Vihar. Jangpura is the administrative headquarters of the district.

== Demographics ==
Since the district was created after the latest Census of India was completed in 2011, independent statistics for South East Delhi is not available yet.

== Economy ==
Many markets of Delhi such as Nehru Place, Lajpat Nagar, and New Friends Colony Market, as well as malls such as Select Citywalk, and The Great India Place, are located in South East Delhi.

== Culture ==
South East Delhi is considered to be one of the most affluent residential districts of Delhi, other than the districts falling under Lutyen's Delhi, viz. New Delhi and Central Delhi. With upscale areas like New Friends Colony, Maharani Bagh, Defence Colony, and Sarita Vihar, it has one of the highest land prices in Delhi. Urban villages in South East Delhi, like Jamia Nagar and Okhla, have become hubs for designer boutiques, restaurants, and art galleries and design studios.

== See also ==
- List of districts of Delhi
