= Sarita Vihar =

- District Subdivision
- Location in Delhi, India
- Coordinates: 28.533890°N 77.289942°E
- Country: India
- State: Delhi
- District: South East Delhi

Government
  - Body: SDMC

Languages
  - Official: Hindi, English
- Time zone: UTC+5:30 (IST)
- Pin code: 110076
- Nearest city: Gurgaon / Faridabad / Noida / Greater Noida
- Lok Sabha constituency: East Delhi
- Civic agency: MCD

Sarita Vihar is a residential colony situated in South East Delhi, National Capital Territory of Delhi, India. It is near the Kalindi Kunj- Noida Toll bridge or GD Birla Marg-Road 13A which connects the district to Noida. The area is situated close to Uttar pradesh border. It is believed that the site was primarily chosen as the construction site for the Games Village of the 1982 Asian Games, however on the insistence of the late prime minister Rajiv Gandhi, the plan was changed to convert it into an upscale residential housing locality. In 2013, it was awarded the "Greenest Colony in Delhi" tag by the then Chief Minister of Delhi Sheila Dikshit, credited to the efforts of its RWA members who have aggressively worked towards improving the state of parks and green spots in the locality.

== Description ==
Built on the acquired village of Madanpur Khadar , Sarita Vihar is located close to the confluence of 3 states namely Delhi, Uttar Pradesh & Haryana and hence has arterial roads with massive traffic movement, connecting the capital with the industrial town of Faridabad, Noida & Greater Noida. It is at a 10 minutes drive with normal road traffic from Noida, Uttar Pradesh, this connectivity advantage means it has become one of the most suitable places to live in South Delhi, giving the residents easy access to various places. Situated on Mathura Road (part of National Highway (NH-2), the colony is easily accessible and its connectivity has been further enhanced by a Metro line (Violet Line) with a dedicated metro station in its name next to it is Apollo Hospital (the biggest corporate hospital in Delhi), District Center, a modern sports complex (Netaji Subhash Sports Complex), Kalindi Kunj and District Police Headquarters.

Okhla Industrial Areas, Phases I and II, are located just opposite to Sarita Vihar on the other side of NH-2. The Sarita Vihar underpass, constructed by the Delhi Development Authority and the Railways, Inaugurated by Venkaiah Naidu in 2014 cuts down the distance between Noida and Okhla from an excruciating 9 km to just 2.9 km and reduces the travel time from 45 minutes to 5–10 minutes. It made it convenient for Noida and Faridabad commuters to reach these two industrial hubs of Delhi and played a pivotal role in improving the traffic conditions in the locality, which has swelled in the last few years. In 2023, Pacific Malls also came up with a new establishment, Pacific Premium Outlets near Jasola Apollo metro station, with a focus on high-end retail and food brands.

There are massive infrastructure projects in the pipeline in March 2019 Union minister for road transport and highways Nitin Gadkari laid the foundation stone for a 59-km six-lane national highway connecting New Delhi's Ring Road with the under-construction Delhi–Mumbai Expressway. The highway alignment was announced by the Centre in May, 2018. The access-controlled highway project will start at the Ring Road-DND junction, pass through the Kalindi bypass, Madanpur khadar, Jaitpur and Mithapur in NCT of Delhi and Faridabad-Ballabhgarh bypass in Haryana under NCR, and will finish at the interchange of the Delhi-Mumbai Expressway at the Western Peripheral Expressway or Kundli-Manesar–Palwal (KMP) Expressway this Project is going to further enhance the appeal of Sarita Vihar

Mohan Cooperative Industrial Estate is nearby, stretching parallel to Sarita Vihar. It is a hub for almost all Indian and international car showrooms. International BPO's, software houses, offices both ultra-modern in Jasola and classical ones, and many eating joints. The people travelling between Noida and Okhla will now save both on time and fuel as the 1,090-metre Sarita Vihar underpass was opened in December, 2014.

== Hospitals ==
- All India Institute of Ayurveda, Delhi The AIIAD project completed in 2016 by the Delhi government for construction of the All India Institute of Ayurveda, Delhi at Sarita Vihar.
- Indraprastha Apollo Hospital, is a stone's throw from Sarita Vihar, and has proven to be a boon for residents, providing some of the best medical facilities in the country.
- Fortis Escorts Heart Institute and
- Holy Family Hospital are some of the hospitals located within the radius of 5 km of Sarita Vihar.

== School and institutes ==
There are many schools and institutes located in Sarita Vihar. A few of the schools are:

- DAV Public School
- Tansen Sangeet Mahavidlkaya
- GURUKUL play school/Day boarding for Kids
- GD Goenka Public School, Sarita Vihar
- Glory Public School
- Shemrock Play School
- Dreamland Play School
- Marigolds Play School
- Kinderland Play School
- Saint Giri Senior Secondary School
- St. Joseph School
- McD Boys School
- Rajkiya Sarvodaya Bal Vidyalaya

Institutes include:

- SCP INFOTECH INSTITUTE Computer Education and NIELIT Facilitation Center
- Periyar Management and Computer College
- Asia-Pacific Institute of Management
- Global Institute of Management Technology

== Social and religious organisations ==
- SCP Foundation (NGO)
- Goonj (NGO)
- mykheti (eFarming)

== See also ==
- Neighbourhoods of Delhi

Areas nearby

- Greater Kailash
- Kalka Mandir
- Lajpat Nagar
- Nehru Place
- New Friends Colony
- Kalkaji
- Noida
- Faridabad
- Govindpuri
- Okhla
- Greater Kailash
- Mohan Estate
- Badarpur
- Maharani Bagh
