= DND–KMP Expressway =

Part of Delhi–Mumbai Expressway in India

- (NH–148NA)
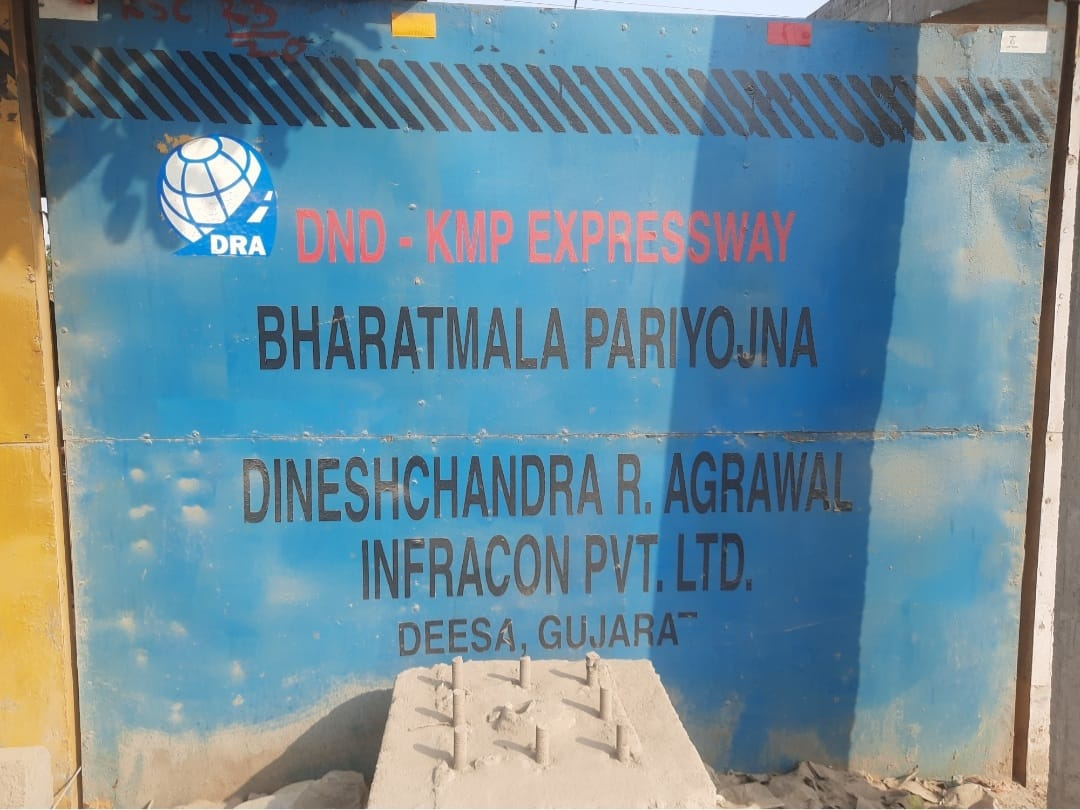

Route information
- Maintained by National Highways Authority of India (NHAI)
- Length: 59 km (37 mi)
- Existed: 23 August 2026–present

Major junctions
- North end: DND Flyway, Maharani Bagh, Delhi
- Spur to Jewar Airport
- South end: KMP, Khalilpur, Nuh district, Haryana

Location
- Country: India
- States: Delhi, Haryana and Uttar Pradesh
- Major cities: New Delhi, Noida, Faridabad, Ballabgarh, Sohna & Jewar

Highway system
- Roads in India; Expressways; National; State; Asian

The DND–Faridabad–KMP Expressway, formally known as NH-148NA is a 59 km long, 6-lane wide access-controlled expressway in Delhi NCR, India. It connects the junction of DND Flyway and Ring Road at Maharani Bagh in Delhi with KMP Expressway at Khalilpur, Nuh district (near Sohna) in Haryana. The NH-148NA is a spur (branch) of Delhi–Mumbai Expressway project. This expressway has an additional 31 km long spur from Sector-65, Faridabad bypass to Yamuna Expressway, connecting Jewar Airport called Jewar Link Expressway.

The DND/ Maharani Bagh interchange and Kalindi Kunj metro are the 2 entry points in the state of Delhi. In Haryana, it passes entirely through existing Faridabad bypass road. The HSVP has transferred the Faridabad bypass to NHAI for the construction of NH–148NA highway. The construction work was started in May 2021 and 20 km stretch from KMP interchange to NH-2 interchange at Kail Gaon (Ballabhgarh) has been opened on 12 February 2023.

The 26km part from Sector 65 to Sohna in Faridabad has been opened for traffic in 2023. The 24 km long stretch from Jaitpur/ Mithapur in Delhi to Sector-65 in Faridabad has been opened to public on 12 November 2024. The remaining 9 km part from Mithapur to DND opened on 23 August 2026.

== History ==
=== Overview: Delhi–Mumbai Expressway ===
The construction work of the Delhi–Mumbai Expressway is divided by the NHAI into 4 sections, with a total of 52 tenders/ construction packages, as given below. The entire 1,350 km long expressway is expected to be completed by January 2025.

| Section | Length in km | No. of packages | State-wise packages | Status |
|---|---|---|---|---|
| DND–Faridabad–KMP | 59 | 03 | 1 in Delhi and 2 in Haryana | Partially Completed |
| Sohna–KMP–Vadodara | 844 | 31 | 3 in Haryana, 13 in Rajasthan, 9 in Madhya Pradesh and 6 in Gujarat | Completed Sohna-KMP-Kota and Chechat to Thandla, remaining under-construction as of October 2025. |
| Vadodara–Virar | 354 | 13 | 10 in Gujarat and 3 in Maharashtra | Completed Vadodara-Kharel section, remaining under-construction as of March 2026. |
| Virar–JNPT | 92 | 05 | 5 in Maharashtra | Under-construction as of March 2026. |

=== Main DND-KMP Expressway ===
For the main DND-KMP Expressway, on 1 March 2019, after foundation stone of NH-148NA was laid by Union Minister Nitin Gadkari in Mithapur in Delhi, NHAI invited bids in December 2019 for construction in 3 packages under Bharatmala Pariyojana, and in July 2020 the work was awarded by to DRA Infracon Private Limited (Package-1 & Package-2) and to DRA Infracon Private Limited (Package-3) in August 2020. Package-3 was completed in 2023, and remaining two packages were completed in 2024, thus completing the maining route.

The construction work of the 'DND–Faridabad–KMP' section was awarded by the National Highways Authority of India (NHAI) to Dineshchandra R. Agrawal Infracon Private Limited (DRA Infracon) in August 2020. This project will reduce congestion on Ashram to Ballabhgarh route (via Badarpur). In Haryana it will have multiple Flyovers and a 3-lane service road on either side of Faridabad bypass road. The NHAI has divided the construction work of 59 km long DND–Faridabad–KMP section of Delhi–Mumbai Expressway project into three packages and awarded it to DRA Infracon. Its construction cost is around ₹5,332 crores (including land acquisition cost).

| Sr No | Package | Length in km | Value in crores | State | Status |
|---|---|---|---|---|---|
| 1. | Junction of DND Flyway & Ring Road in Delhi to Jaitpur–Pushta road in Delhi | 09 | ₹1,881 | Delhi | Under Construction |
| 2. | Jaitpur–Pushta road in Delhi to Sector-62/65 dividing road in Faridabad | 24 | ₹1,832 | Delhi & Haryana | Completed 12 November 2024 |
| 3. | Sector-62/65 dividing road in Faridabad to KMP Expressway at Khalilpur in Nuh district | 26 | ₹1,619 | Haryana | Completed 12 February 2023 |

=== Faridabad-Jewar Expressway spur ===
The NHAI had announced in August 2021, that an additional 31 km long spur will also be constructed from Noida International Airport in Jewar to Faridabad bypass road on this expressway. In July 2022, the tender was awarded Apco Infratech Pvt Ltd.

| Spur Package | Length in km | Value in crores | State |
|---|---|---|---|
| Faridabad bypass (Sector 65), via interchange with EPE at Mohna, to Yamuna Expressway at Dayanat Pur village, north of Jewar | 31 | ₹3,630(Revised Cost) | Haryana and UP |

== Route ==
=== Main DND-KMP Expressway route ===
The NH–148NA highway connects Sarai Kale Khan & Kalindi Kunj (Delhi), Noida, Jewar, Faridabad and Ballabhgarh to the main alignment of Delhi–Mumbai Expressway via an interchange at Khalilpur, Nuh district (Haryana).

==== Delhi (12 km) ====
7 km out of 9 km route of in Delhi state is elevated with two-level crossings at 4 locations of the Delhi Metro rail line (near Okhla Vihar and Kalindi Kunj metro station), making it the 1st expressway in India to cross above elevated metro rail line. NH-148NA exits Delhi at MCD Toll Plaza (near Mithapur) which is 12.5 km from the DND starting point.

- Begins in Delhi from the junction of DND Flyway and Ring Road at Maharani Bagh
- Pass through Khizrabad, Batla House and Okhla Vihar on Yamuna river's west bank
- Starts moving exactly along the Agra Canal from Okhla Vihar metro station to Mithapur
- 2nd entry ramp near Kalindi Kunj metro station (towards Hari Nagar/ Mithapur) for traffic from Noida
- Exits Delhi and enters Haryana through MCD Toll Plaza near Mithapur Extension, Delhi.

==== Haryana (47 km) ====
- On Kalindi Kunj–Mithapur road, it will cross the Agra Canal at Sehatpur Bridge (Faridabad)
- Move on Faridabad bypass road from Sector-37, Faridabad to Kail Gaon near Ballabhgarh
- At Sector-65 Faridabad bypass, there is a 31 km long link highway to Jewar Airport
- Interchange with Delhi–Agra (NH-2) near DPS Ballabhgarh school at Kail Gaon
- Passes under the Western DFC at Paroli village (Palwal district)
- Crosses Palwal–Sohna (NH-919) at Hajipur village (Gurgaon district)
- Toll Plaza at Kherli jita (Palwal district). It is 56 km from the DND starting point
- Trumpet interchange with KMP Expressway at Khalilpur (Nuh district): after reaching KMP interchange at Khalilpur, traffic coming from Maharani Bagh (Delhi) and Faridabad bypass has 2 options:
  - They can turn south towards Dausa and Mumbai, or turn north towards Gurgaon and Sohna.
  - They can also use KMP Expressway and turn east for Palwal and turn west for Manesar.

=== Faridabad-Jewar Airport Expressway spur ===
6-lane (expandable to 8-lanes) 31.4 km expressway with additional 10 km service roads, will cuts down Faridabad-Jewar Airport travel time from 90 minutes to 15 to 30 minutes.

- Haryana (Faridabad), 24.1 km:
  - Faridabad Sector-65 bypass, route begins from DND–KMP Expressway.
  - EPE interchange at Mohna village.
- Uttar Pradesh (Jewar), 7.3 km:
  - Yamuna Expressway interchange at Dayanat Pur village north of Jewar Airport.
  - Jewar Airport, terminates.

== Status updates ==
- Main DND-KMP Expressway:
  - 2024: Total 50 km completed and operational except Package 1 of 9 km
  - 2026: Package 1 open from DND to KMP full stretch
- Faridabad-Jewar Airport Expressway spur:
  - 2022 July: tender awarded to Apco Infratech Pvt Ltd.
  - 2025 October: 53% completed, Jewar Airport to Haryana borer will be completed by December 2025, remaining route from Haryana border to Palwal/Faridabad will be completed by December 2026.
- DND-KMP Elevated Section:
  - 2026 March: 1200 pillars completed, progress on track for on-time completion in April 2027.
  - 2026 August: NHAI opens one side of the 9 KM elevated corridor for trial runs while the work is progressing on the other side of the elevated road.
  - 2026 September: Both sides of the 9 km stretch are open for trial runs now while the finishing touches are being added.

== See also ==
- Expressways of India
- Delhi–Amritsar–Katra Expressway
- Delhi–Mumbai Expressway
- List of highways in Haryana
