= Okhla =

Neighbourhood in South Delhi, India

- Neighbourhood of Delhi
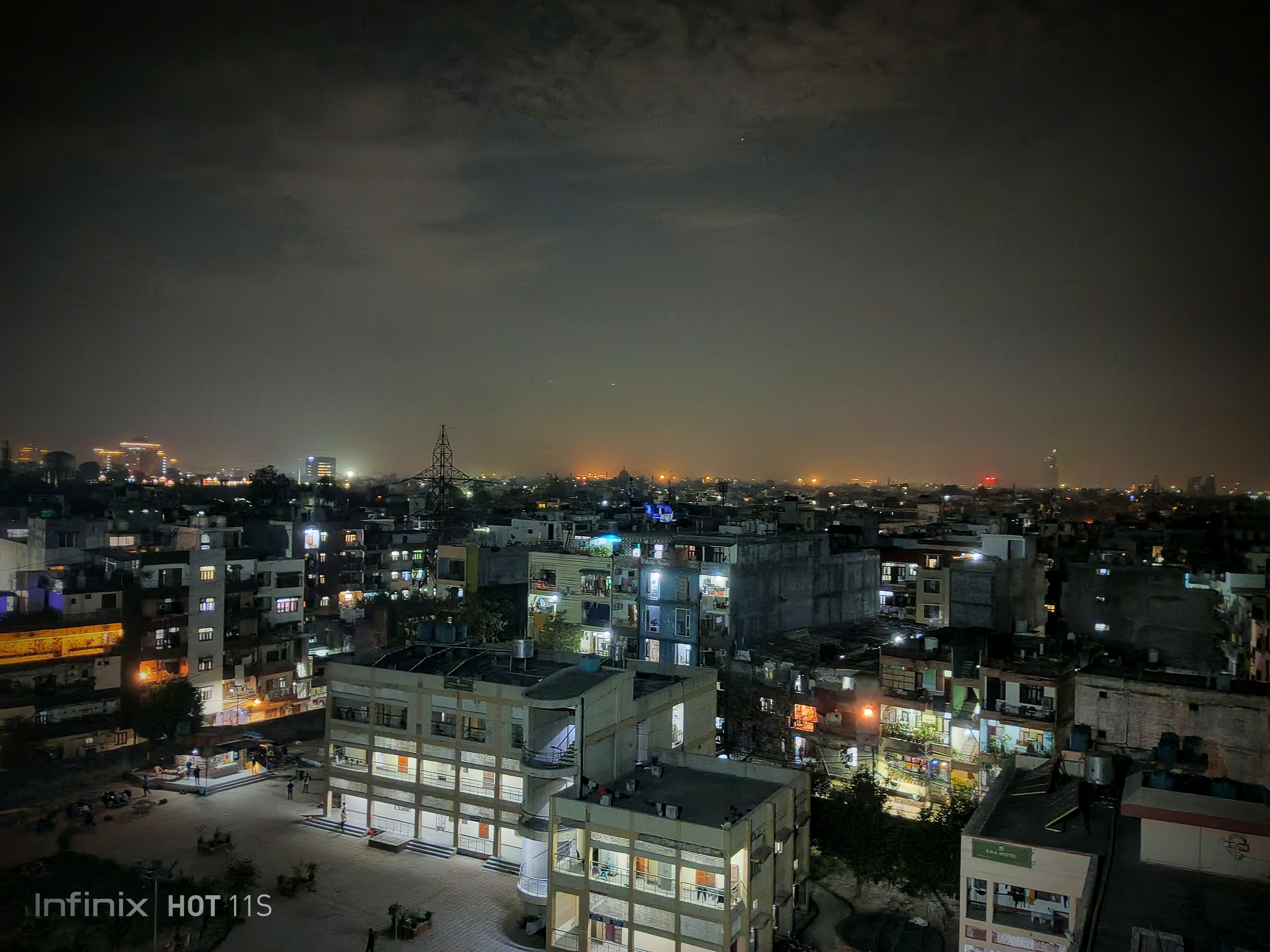
- Night view of Zakir Nagar, a residential area located in Okhla

- Location in Delhi, India
- Coordinates: 28°34′N 77°17′E
- Country: India
- State: Delhi
- District: South East Delhi
- Named for: Okhla Village

Government
  - MLA: Amanatullah Khan (Aam Aadmi Party)

Languages
  - Official: Hindi; English
  - Additional official: Punjabi; Urdu
- Time zone: UTC+5:30 (IST)
- PIN: 110025
- Vehicle registration: DL
- Planning agency: MCD

Okhla (short for 'Old Kanal Housing and Land Authority' ) is an urban neighbourhood located by the Okhla barrage in South East Delhi, near the border between Delhi and Uttar Pradesh. Okhla has lent its name to the nearby township of New Okhla Industrial Development Authority or Noida. Okhla is an assembly constituency.

== About ==
Okhla is one of the oldest inhabited areas in Delhi near the bank of Yamuna River. This can be judged from the making of Okhla canal (Agra Canal) by the British in 1874, presently known as Okhla Head.

== History ==
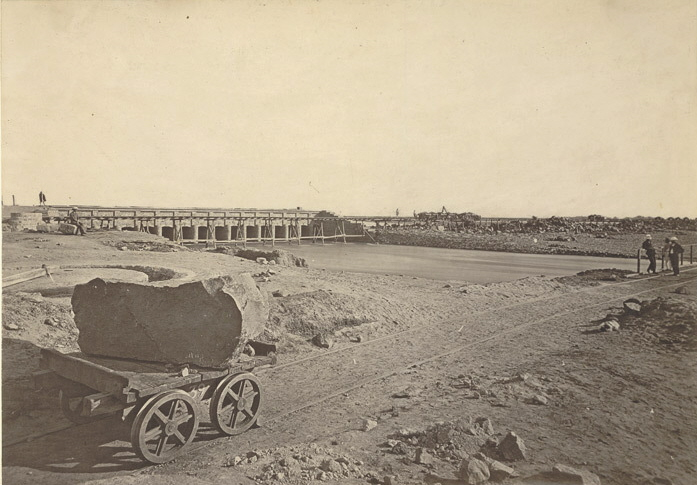
Agra Canal headworks at Okhla, 1871

The area gets its name from the village of Okhla, which the site currently sits on. The village was originally inhabited by the Gurjar, Jat, and Yadav communities. The Okhla barrage is a barrage that was developed by the British. It is also the starting point of the Agra Canal built in 1874. Today it is also the location of the Okhla Bird Sanctuary, and further down the canal towards Agra, the Keetham Lake National Bird Sanctuary.

The present campus of Jamia Millia Islamia, a central university, was established here in 1925. Also located in the neighbourhood are the NSIC, IIIT Delhi, Govind Ballabh Pant Engineering College, Lotus Temple, and the Okhla railway station.

== Okhla Industrial Estate ==
Okhla Industrial Estate, an industrial domain of New Delhi in South Delhi was established by National Small Industries Corporation and was one of the 12 such estates being developed across India to encourage small industries. Construction work at the site began in 1952 and it was finally inaugurated in 1958, and in time became synonymous to growth of small scale industries in region. Today it is divided in three phases.

=== Phases ===
Okhla Industrial Estate Phase I and Phase II is one of the 28 industrial areas of Delhi, as per the Master Plan of 2001. Revenue earners from this base include ready-made garment exporters and leather garment exporters, besides other segments of the industry such as pharmaceutical manufacturing units, plastic and packaging industries, printing presses, machinery manufacturers, call centers, MNCs Office, Bank, and others.

Okhla Industrial Estate Phase III spreads over 110 acres (0.45 km^{2}) and is a modest industrial foundation laid out by the British architect Walter George, who was famous for the planning and construction of Parliament House, North, and South Blocks.

== Overview ==
The whole industrial area was named after the main Okhla town, in South Delhi. Nearby areas have now extensively grown into neighbourhoods like Jogabai extension, Batla House, Okhla Vihar, Zakir Nagar, Jamia Nagar, Abul Fazal Enclave, Shaheen Bagh, Kalindi Colony, and Kalindi Kunj.

Okhla has a heavily Muslim population and shows a high linguistic literacy rate. It is a state assembly constituency, part of the East Delhi Lok Sabha constituency. Most of the Muslim families currently living in Okhla are migrants from Uttar Pradesh and Bihar. From the 1990s, Muslim migrants from Bihar, Uttar Pradesh and other areas of north India started coming and settling in the localities."

== Neighbourhoods ==
East of Kailash, New Friends Colony, Nehru Place, Kalkaji, Abul Fazal Enclave, Sukhdev Vihar, Greater Kailash, Govindpuri, Sriniwaspuri, Tuglaqabad, Sarita Vihar, Jasola, Shaheen Bagh, Jaitpur, Madanpur, Badarpur, Zakir Nagar, Okhla Vihar, Ghaffar Manzil Colony, Haji colony, Ishwar Nagar and Harkesh Nagar are the surrounding areas. The area is surrounded by Okhla Mandi -- one of Delhi’s largest wholesale vegetable and fruit markets.

== Educational Institutions ==
Jamia Millia Islamia is the biggest landmark — a central university with a long history since 1920. There are also schools, coaching centers, and research institutes in the area.

== Wildlife sanctuaries ==
Okhla Bird Sanctuary is a nearby Bird Park and Wildlife Sanctuary located in Noida, where during the month of September thousands of migratory birds including shovellers, pintail, common teal, gadwall, and blue-winged teal visit the area every year. The Okhla Bird Sanctuary lies on its edge near Kalindi Kunj Barrage. Despite pollution and urban encroachment, it's a biodiversity hotspot in Delhi NCR.

== Hospitals ==
There are many hospitals in the area, including Indraprastha Apollo Hospital, Al-Shifa, Cribs Hospital, Holy Family Hospital, Fortis Escorts, and other small hospitals and clinics.

== Hygiene ==
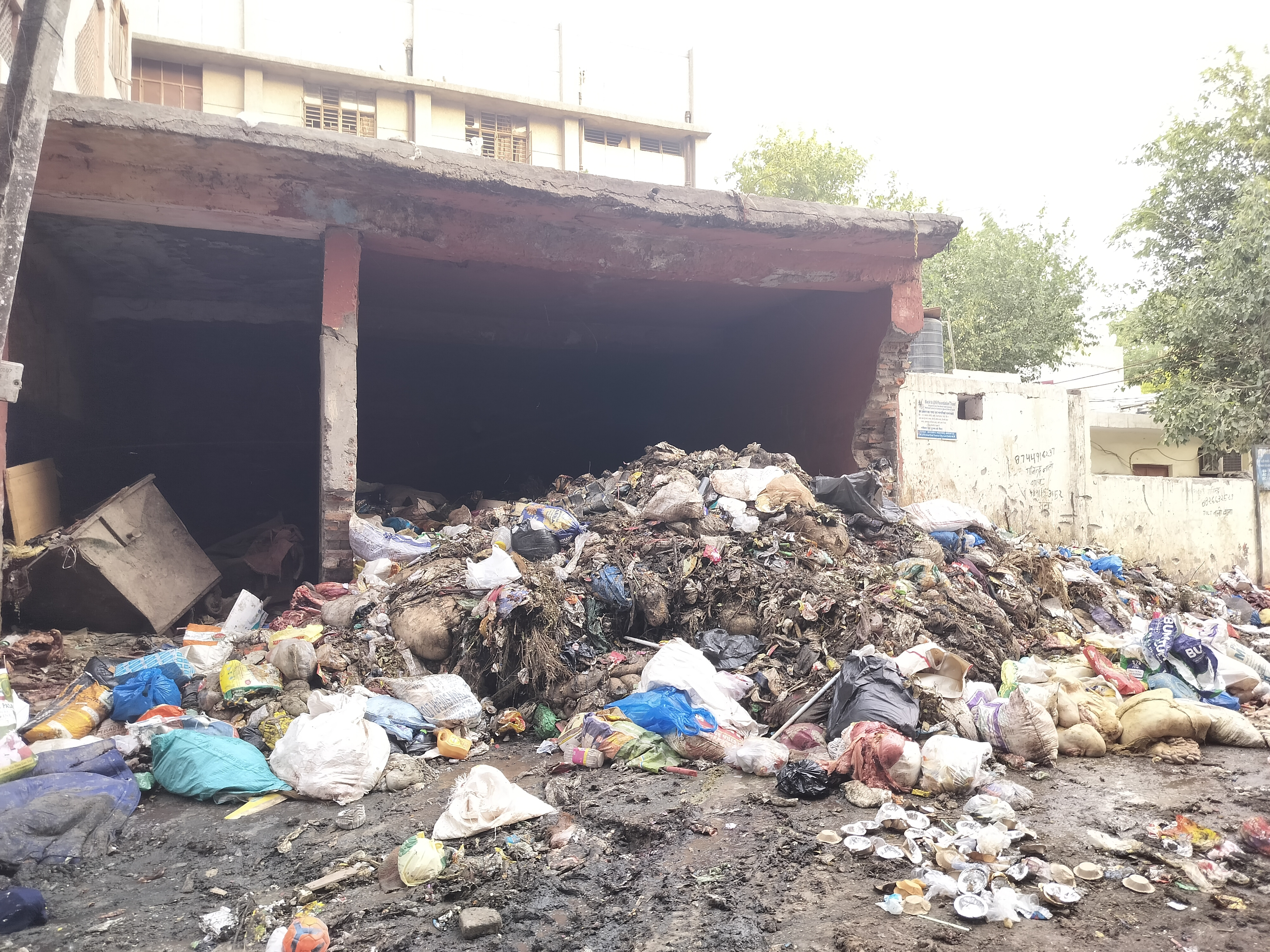
Garbage heap in Batla House, Okhla

Civic hygiene has been a concern in Okhla and people struggle with overflowing garbage. The overused landfills in the area have been termed as dark spots. New Indian Express, in a July 2021 report stated, "The 22km stretch of Yamuna from Wazirabad to Okhla in Delhi, which is less than two per cent of the river length, accounts for about 80 per cent of the pollution in the river."

== Connectivity ==
Okhla is well connected via roadways and railways and is not too far away from the IGI Airport. Business districts such as Nehru Place, Connaught Place and Lajpat Nagar are considerably close resulting in good access to public services.

Okhla is also connected to the Delhi Metro Magenta Line Network - Jasola Vihar-Shaheen Bagh, Okhla Vihar, Jamia Millia Islamia and Sukhdev Vihar.

Delhi Transport Corporation buses via various Bus stops and terminus are operating from Okhla.

== See also ==
- Kaushalya Dam in Pinjore
- Bhakra Dam
- Hathni Kund Barrage
- Tajewala Barrage
- Surajkund barrage
- List of National Parks & Wildlife Sanctuaries of Haryana, India
