= Okhla Vihar =

Okhla Vihar is a new settlement in Okhla, in the district of South East Delhi, India. It consists of many lanes (roads) and many sub-lanes (sub-roads). Over 80% of the area of Okhla Vihar is covered with 5-story apartments. The area consists of three mosques and a church. Amanatullah Khan is the local M.L.A (member of the Legislative Assembly) from AAP (Aam Admi Party).

== Transport ==
Okhla Vihar is a ten-minute drive from the business hubs like Nehru Place. Nearby popular locations are River Yamuna, Escorts Hospital, Jamia Millia Islamia University, and Holy Family Hospital. Rickshaws, e-rickshaws, auto-rickshaws, cabs, and taxis are the main forms of public transport. Transport is available to nearby commercial and official areas such as NOIDA (New Okhla Industrial Development Authority), Nehru Place, Sarita Vihar, Jasola, Johri Farm, Okhla Industrial Area, and Okhla Railway Station. Okhla Vihar Metro Station is present on Magenta line. Another nearby metro train station is Jasola, that is present 10–20 meters from Mother Dairy Jasola.

For travelling to nearby places, there are many e-rickshaws charging 10-30 rupees. The nearby bus stop is Tikona Park, just in front of Jamia Millia Islamia metro station from where one can take DTC (Delhi Transport Corporation) bus routes 507 (ARSD/Dhaula Kuan), 402 (Babarpur), 403 (Old Delhi Railway Station), 274, 463, and 894 (Karampura terminal).

== See also ==
- Jamia Millia Islamia
- New Friends Colony
- Maharani Bagh
- Johri Farm
- Shaheen Bagh
