= Gokul barrage =

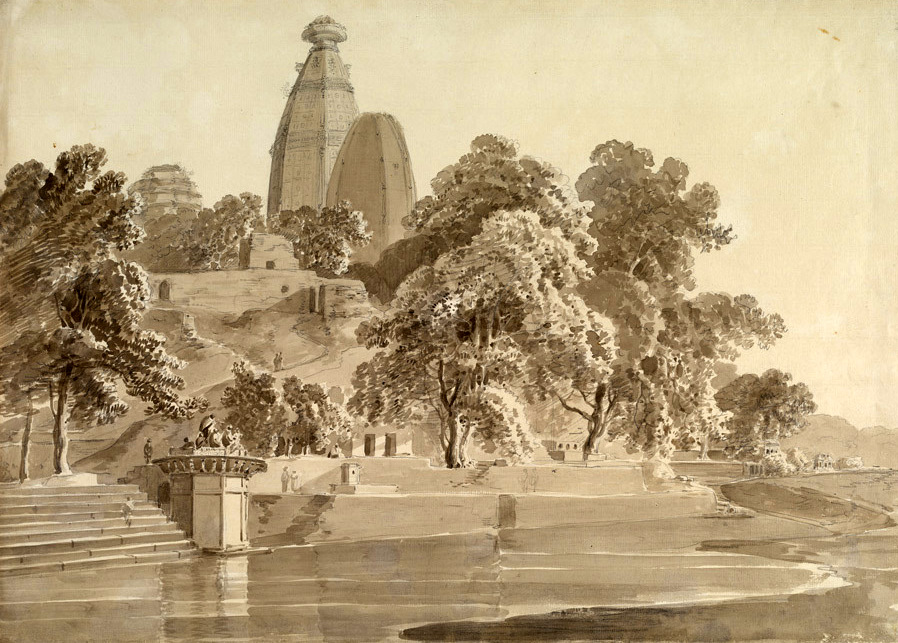
- Madan Mohan temple on Yamuna.

- Location in Uttar Pradesh, India
- Country: India
- Location: Gokul in Mathura district
- Coordinates: 27°26′35″N 77°42′58″E
- Status: Functional
- Opening date: 2003

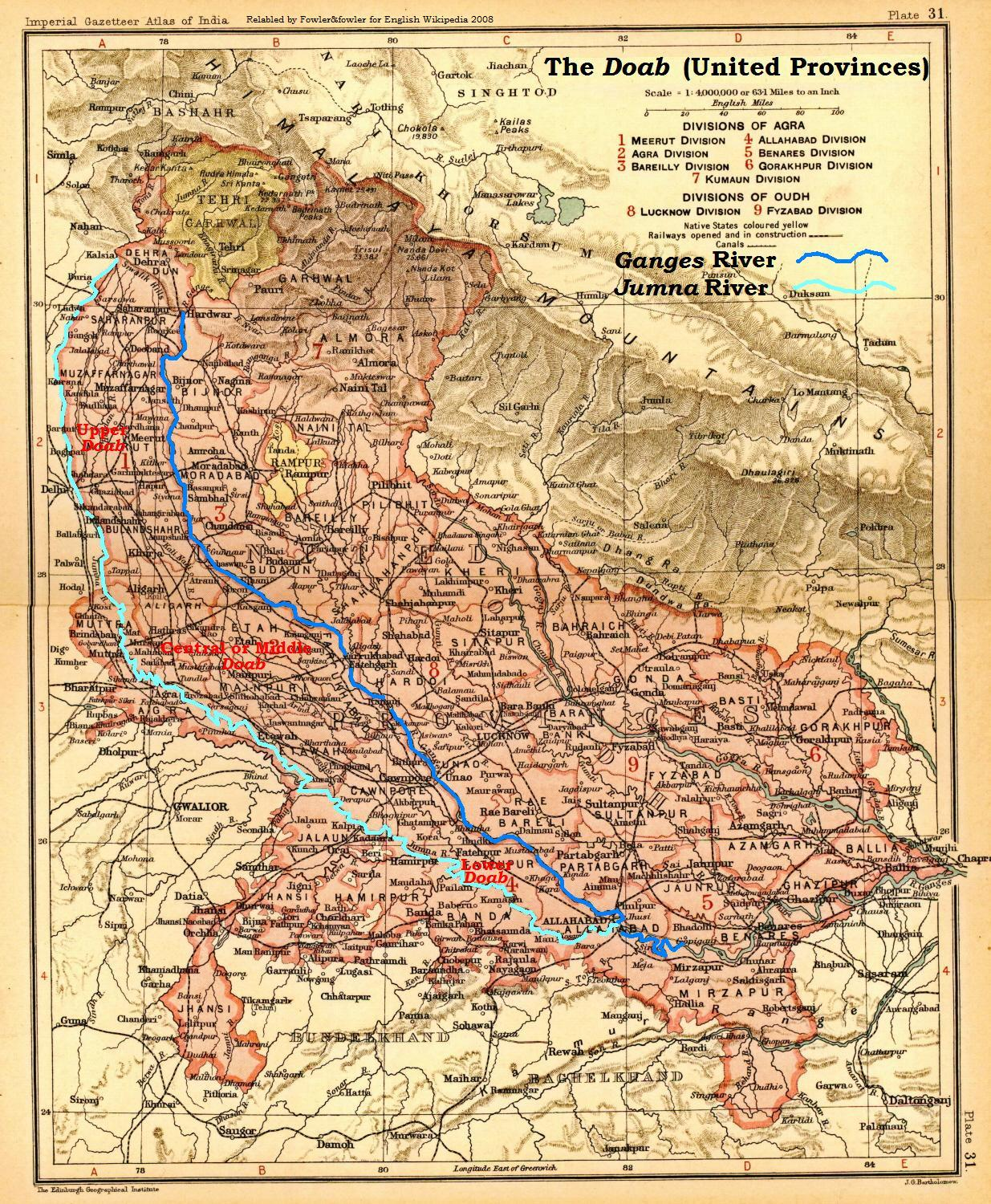
Mathura in Ganga-Jamuna Doab, United Provinces 1908.

The Gokul barrage, also Mathura barrage is a barrage on Yamuna River at Gokul in Mathura district, top of which also serves as the road bridge.

Yamuna has a total of 6 barrages, from north-west to south-east, Dakpathar Barrage (Uttarakhand), Hathni Kund Barrage (172km from Yamunotri origin, replaced the older defunct Tajewala Barrage in Haryana), Wazirabad barrage (244km from Hathnikund to north Delhi), ITO barrage (central Delhi), Okhla barrage (22km from Wazirabad to south Delhi, "New Okhla barrage" is later-era new barrage) and Mathura barrage (at Gokul, Uttar Pradesh).

== History ==
Gokul Barrage, 7 km downstream from Mathura, was proposed to be completed by March 2003, to supply 30 cusec water to Mathura and Vrindavan and also 115 cusec water to Agra.

== Concerns ==
The construction of barrage has reduced the flow of Yamuna and water downstream of Mathura has become more polluted due to lack of flushing.

== Navigation restoration ==
Yaumna river is part of National Waterway NW110, one of India's 111 National Waterways.
