= ITO barrage =

Coordinates: 28.628337°N 77.255186°E

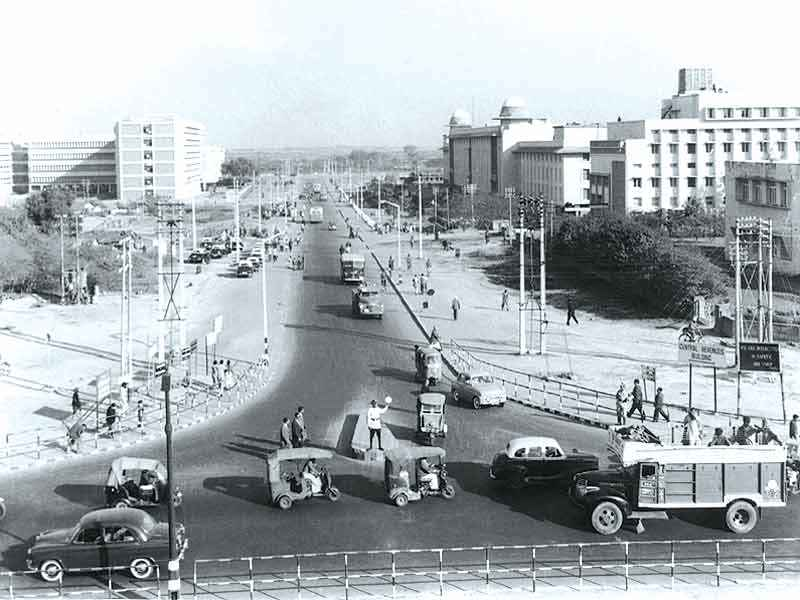
- ITO crossroads next to barrage, New Delhi in 1950

- Location within Delhi
- Country: India
- Location: ITO metro station in Delhi
- Status: Functional
- Opening date: ?

Dam and spillways
- Length: 552 m (1,811 ft)

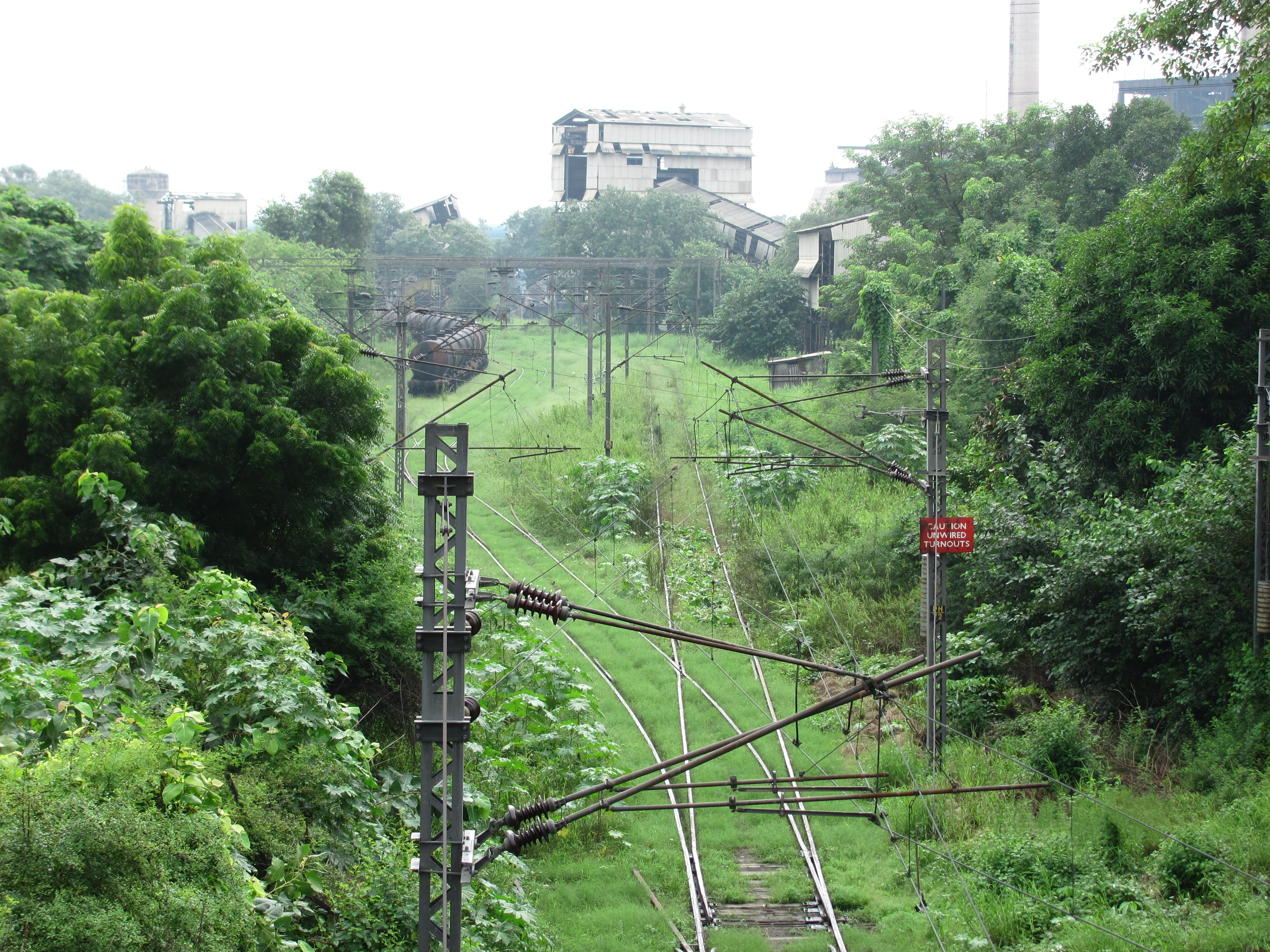
Landscape on a drizzling day near ITO in Delhi (c. 2010)

The ITO barrage, also Indraprastha barrage and ITO Bridge, is a 552 meter barrage on Yamuna River, top of which also serves as the bridge on the Paharganj-Ghaziabad Vikas marg. Yamuna flows for 48 km in Delhi, including 22 km from Wazirabad barrage where it enters Delhi to Okhla barrage after which it enters Haryana. Upstream barrage from ITO barrage in Delhi is Wazirabad barrage (north) and downstream is Okhla barrage (south). Yamuna has a total of 6 barrages, from north-west to south-east, Dakpathar Barrage (Uttarakhand), Hathni Kund Barrage (172 km from Yamunotri origin, replaced the older defunct Tajewala Barrage in Haryana), Wazirabad barrage (244 km from Hathnikund to north Delhi), ITO barrage (central Delhi), Okhla barrage (22 km from Wazirabad to south Delhi, "New Okhla barrage" is later-era new barrage) and Mathura barrage (at Gokul, Uttar Pradesh).

ITO barrage is under the management of the Haryana Government, whereas Wazirabad barrage is managed by Delhi and Okhla barrage is managed by UP Government.

== History ==
In 1988, improved design of expansion joints for long span bridges was adopted at the ITO Barrage bridge to strengthen the load bearing capacity. In 1989 the survey was carried out from Wazirabad barrage to ITO barrage and from ITO barrage to Okhla barrage, with a proposal to introduce ferry service after improving water channel, though no further action was taken. In early 2000s, HUDCO proposed to channelise Yamuna from ITO barrage to Kalindi Kunj Barrage, including developing commercial space. Floodplain in this area is 2 to 3 km wide. Prior to 2010, ITO Bridge and Nizamuddin Bridge were newly widened by constructing additional bridges parallel to the existing to ease the flow of traffic from the trans-Yamuna areas.

== Usage ==
Vijay Ghat to the ITO barrage has several Raj Ghat and associated memorials samadhis as well as Indira Gandhi Arena that was used for the Asiad 1982. ITO Barrage also serves as the ITO bridge, the most important bridge for intra-city movements across river Yamuna. The Yamuna water from ITO Barrage was used for the cooling of two units of Indraprastha Power Generation's thermal Rajghat Power Station.

== Navigation restoration ==
This barrage on Yamuna is part of National Waterway NW110, one of India's 111 National Waterways. Okhla barrage lies on the Delhi-Agra Yamuna canal waterway, from Okhla barrage to Agra via Agra Canal, steamer service is planned by the end of June 2017 with the help of Netherlands (c. Feb 2017).

== See also ==
- Gokul barrage
- Masani barrage
