= Jamia Millia Islamia metro station =

Metro station in Delhi, India

Jamia Millia Islamia

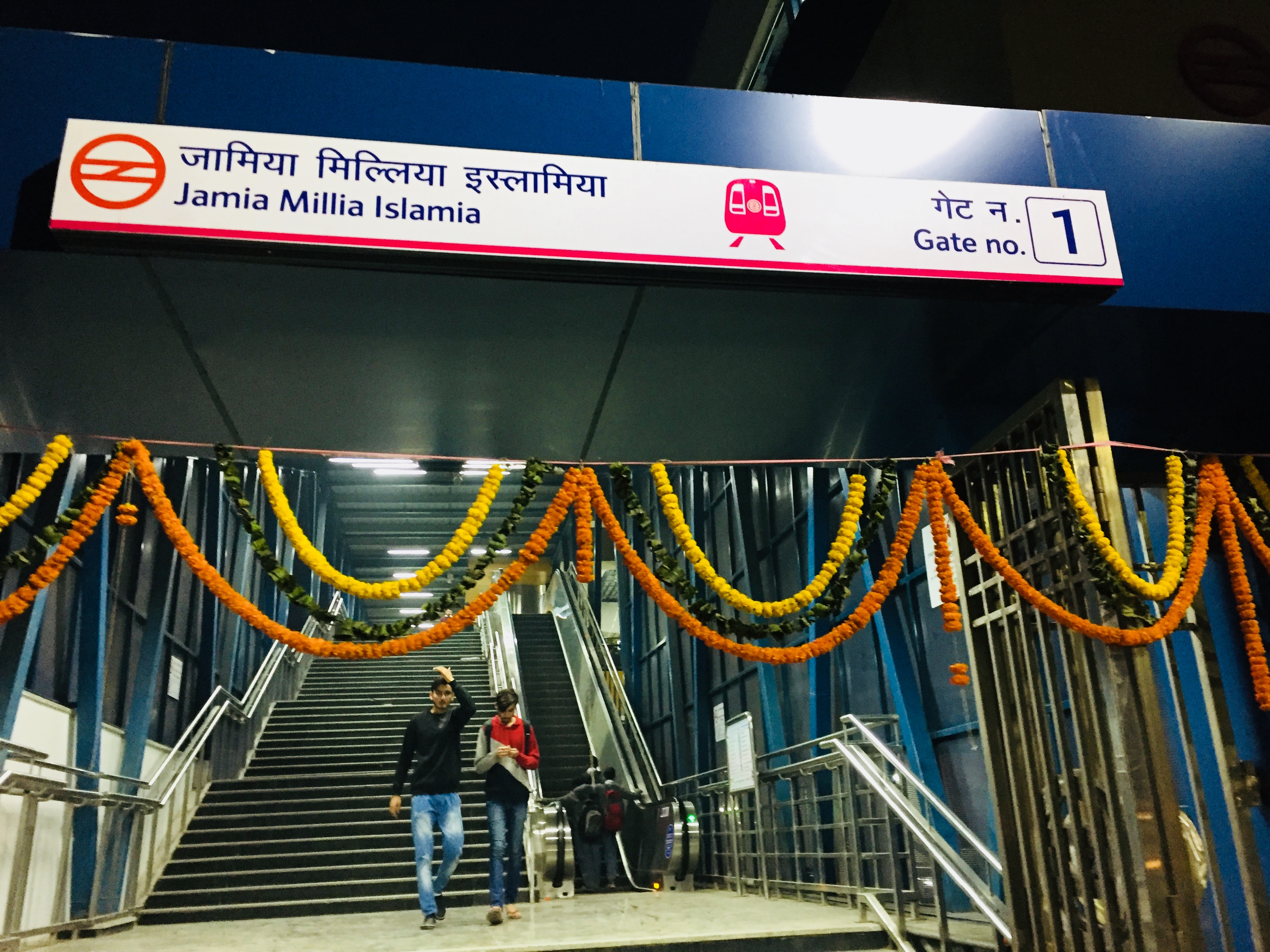

General information
- Location: Okhla Rd, Azim Dairy, Jamia Nagar, Okhla, Delhi, 110025
- Coordinates: 28°33′46″N 77°17′10″E
- System: Delhi Metro station
- Owner: Delhi Metro
- Operator: Delhi Metro Rail Corporation (DMRC)
- Line: Magenta Line
- Platforms: Side platform Platform-1 → Botanical Garden; Platform-2 → Inderlok
- Tracks: 2

Construction
- Structure type: Elevated
- Platform levels: 2
- Parking: Available
- Accessible: Yes

Other information
- Station code: JANR

History
- Opened: 25 December 2017; 8 years ago
- Electrified: 25 kV 50 Hz AC through overhead catenary

Services
Preceding station	Delhi Metro	Following station
Sukhdev Vihar towards Inderlok	Magenta Line	Okhla Vihar towards Botanical Garden
Route map
Location

The Jamia Millia Islamia metro station is located on the Magenta Line of the Delhi Metro which was inaugurated on 25 December 2017 by Prime Minister Narendra Modi.

Jamia Millia Islamia is part of Phase III of Delhi Metro, on the Magenta Line.

== The station ==
=== Structure ===
Jamia Millia Islamia elevated metro station situated on the Magenta Line of Delhi Metro.

=== Station layout ===
L2	Side platform | Doors will open on the left
L2	Platform 1 East bound	Towards → Botanical Garden; Next Station: Okhla Vihar
L2	Platform 2 Westbound	Towards ← Inderlok; Next Station: Sukhdev Vihar
L2	Side platform | Doors will open on the left
L1	Concourse	Fare control, station agent, Metro Card vending machines, crossover
G	Street Level	Exit/Entrance

== Connections ==
=== Bus ===
Delhi Transport Corporation bus routes number 274, 400, 402CL, 403, 403CL, 403STL, 463, 507CL, 507STL, 534C, 894, 894CL, 894STL serves the station.

=== E-rickshaw ===
DMRC flagged off 25 GPS enabled e-rickshaws called ETO which will provide last mile connectivity within an area of 3-4 kilometers. The rickshaws, which could be booked through the ETO app, will ply from 6AM to 11PM and charge ₹10 for the first 2 kilometers and ₹5 for each subsequent kilometre.

== Entry/Exit ==
Jamia Millia Islamia metro station Entry/exits
Gate No-1	Gate No-2	Gate No-3
Jamia Millia Islamia University	Batla House	Tikona Park
Jamia Community Centre	Zakir Nagar	
Noor Nagar	Joga Bai	
Ghaffar Manzil	Jauhar Bagh	
	Okhla Village	

== See also ==
- Delhi
- List of Delhi Metro stations
- Transport in Delhi
- Delhi Metro Rail Corporation
- Delhi Suburban Railway
- Delhi Monorail
- Delhi Transport Corporation
- South East Delhi
- Jamia Millia Islamia
- Okhla Sanctuary
- Okhla barrage
- Kalindi Kunj
- National Capital Region (India)
- List of rapid transit systems
- List of metro systems
