= Okhla NSIC metro station =

Metro station in Delhi, India

Okhla NSIC

General information
- Location: NSIC, Okhla Phase III, New Delhi, Delhi, 110020
- Coordinates: 28°33′17″N 77°15′53″E
- System: Delhi Metro station
- Owner: Delhi Metro
- Operator: Delhi Metro Rail Corporation (DMRC)
- Line: Magenta Line
- Platforms: Side platform Platform-1 → Botanical Garden; Platform-2 → Inderlok
- Tracks: 2

Construction
- Structure type: Elevated
- Platform levels: 2
- Accessible: Yes

Other information
- Station code: OKNS

History
- Opened: 25 December 2017; 8 years ago
- Electrified: 25 kV 50 Hz AC through overhead catenary

Services
Preceding station	Delhi Metro	Following station
Kalkaji Mandir towards Inderlok	Magenta Line	Sukhdev Vihar towards Botanical Garden
Route map
Location

The Okhla NSIC metro station is located on the Magenta Line of the Delhi Metro. The station was opened on 25 December 2017.

== The station ==
=== Structure ===
Okhla NSIC elevated metro station situated on the Magenta Line of Delhi Metro.

=== Station layout ===
L2	Side platform | Doors will open on the left
L2	Platform 1 East bound	Towards → Botanical Garden; Next Station: Sukhdev Vihar
L2	Platform 2 Westbound	Towards ← Inderlok; Next Station: Kalkaji Mandir Change at the next stop for Violet Line
L2	Side platform | Doors will open on the left
L1	Concourse	Fare control, station agent, Metro Card vending machines, crossover
G	Street Level	Exit/Entrance

=== Facilities ===
List of available ATM at Okhla NSIC metro station are,

== Entry/Exit ==
Okhla NSIC metro station Entry/exits
Gate No-1	Gate No-2
Okhla Railway Station	NSIC Exhibition Complex
Shyambhu Dayal Bagh	Lotus Temple
	Kalkaji Mandir

== Connections ==
=== Bus ===
Delhi Transport Corporation bus routes number 47A, 306, 411, 427, 433A, 433LnkSTL, 463, 480, 493, 534A, OMS(+)(-), OMS(+)AC serves the station.

=== Rail ===
Okhla railway station of Indian Railways situated nearby.

== See also ==
- Delhi
- List of Delhi Metro stations
- Transport in Delhi
- Delhi Metro Rail Corporation
- Delhi Suburban Railway
- Delhi Monorail
- Delhi Transport Corporation
- South East Delhi
- Jamia Millia Islamia
- Okhla Sanctuary
- Okhla railway station
- National Capital Region (India)
- List of rapid transit systems
- List of metro systems
