= Atlantic Water World =

Coordinates: 28.545851°N 77.310037°E

- Interactive map of the Atlantic Water World area

General information
- Type: Dutch Wheels (Vekoma) R50 transportable Ferris wheel
- Location: Delhi, India
- Completed: 2010
- Opened: 2014
- Cost: Approximately Rs 700 million

The Delhi Eye transportable Ferris wheel installation at Kalindi Kunj Park in the Okhla neighbourhood of Delhi, India, opened to the public in October 2014.

The wheel can carry six passengers, from which Akshardham Temple, Humayun's Tomb, Lotus Temple, Qutb Minar and Red Fort are visible on a clear day. It was constructed by Dutch Wheels BV.

Conflicting reports credit the Atlantic Water World with an overall height of either (approximately) 45 metres (148 ft) or 61 metres (200 ft) (The Indian Express suggests both), and a diameter of "slightly over 40" m (130 ft). According to locals, it was removed in 2017. The place is currently used a Banquet Hall for various functions.

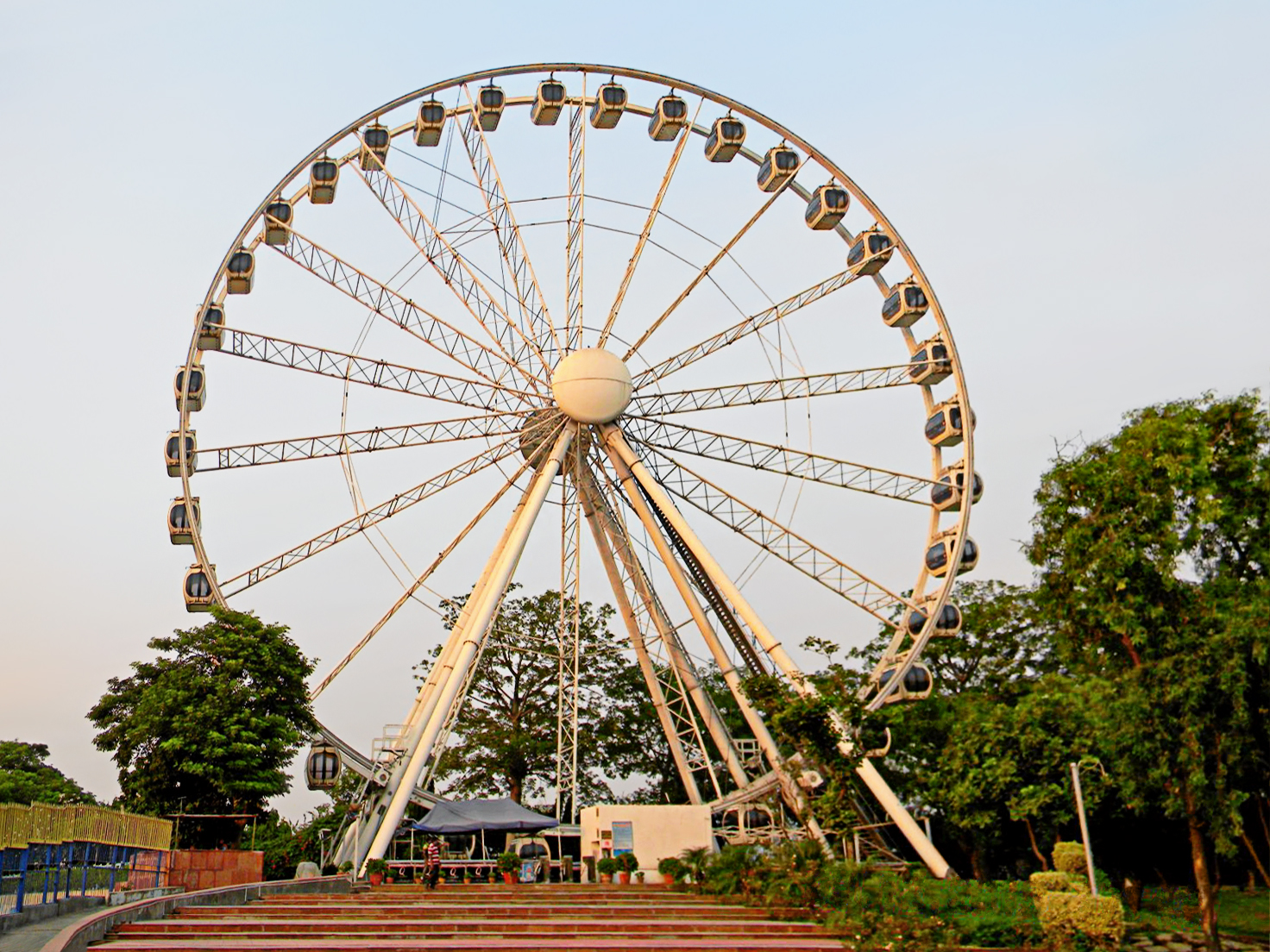
Delhi Eye
