= Jasola Vihar Shaheen Bagh metro station =

Metro station in Delhi, India

Jasola Vihar Shaheen Bagh

General information
- Location: Jasola Vihar Main Rd, Shaheen Bagh, Jasola, New Delhi, 110025
- Coordinates: 28°32′45″N 77°17′48″E
- System: Delhi Metro station
- Owner: Delhi Metro
- Operator: Delhi Metro Rail Corporation (DMRC)
- Line: Magenta Line
- Platforms: Side platform Platform-1 → Botanical Garden; Platform-2 → Inderlok
- Tracks: 4

Construction
- Structure type: Elevated
- Platform levels: 2
- Parking: Available
- Accessible: Yes

Other information
- Station code: JLA8

History
- Opened: 25 December 2017; 8 years ago
- Electrified: 25 kV 50 Hz AC through overhead catenary

Services
Preceding station	Delhi Metro	Following station
Okhla Vihar towards Inderlok	Magenta Line	Kalindi Kunj towards Botanical Garden
Route map
Location

The Jasola Vihar Shaheen Bagh metro station is located on the Magenta Line of the Delhi Metro. Jasola Vihar Shaheen Bagh is part of Phase III of Delhi Metro on the Magenta Line. The station opened on 25 December 2017.

== History ==
Jasola Vihar Shaheen Bagh metro station was opened on 25 Dec 2016 and was formed in South east delhi zone bordering with Uttar Pradesh to cater wide population residing here, Famous Shaheen bagh protest was also organised near Shaheen bagh metro. The metro is on Magenta line and its opening ceremony was done by PM modi and CM of Uttar Pradesh because it was connected with Botanical garden which comes under Uttar Pradesh.

One fact about this Station was that here In Jasola Vihar Shaheen Bagh metro beside this there is the biggest maintenance centre and this metro is in the middle of both Jasola and Shaheen bagh so its name is mixed Jasola Vihar Shaheen Bagh and through a footover bridge it is connected to Shaheen bagh road via Gate no 5 (Allama Shibli road) Some important nearest location from Shaheen bagh side is Shaheen Masjid, 40 foot road, Shaheen bagh Mandi

== The station ==
=== Structure ===
Jasola Vihar Shaheen Bagh is elevated metro station situated on the Magenta Line of Delhi Metro.

=== Station layout ===
L2	Side platform | Doors will open on the left
L2	Platform 1 East bound	Towards → Botanical Garden; Next Station: Kalindi Kunj
L2	Platform 2 Westbound	Towards ← Inderlok; Next Station: Okhla Vihar
L2	Side platform | Doors will open on the left
L1	Concourse	Fare control, station agent, Metro Card vending machines, crossover
G	Street Level	Exit/Entrance

=== Facilities ===
List of available ATM at Jasola Vihar Shaheen Bagh metro station are,

== Entry/Exit ==
Jasola Vihar Shaheen Bagh metro station Entry/exits
Gate No-1	Gate No-2	Gate No-3	Gate No-4	Gate No-5
Jasola Vihar	DDA Flats	Kalindi Kunj	Living Style Mall	Abul Fazal Enclave
Jasola Heights	Okhla Vihar	Madanpur Khadar	DLF Towers	Shaheen Masjid
Good Samaritan School	Jasola Puliya		APIM	Shaheen Bagh Chowk
Government Sr. Secondary School	Shaheen Bagh Police Station			

== See also ==
- Delhi
- List of Delhi Metro stations
- Transport in Delhi
- Delhi Metro Rail Corporation
- Delhi Suburban Railway
- Delhi Monorail
- Delhi Transport Corporation
- Noida
- Okhla Sanctuary
- Okhla barrage
- Kalindi Kunj
- National Capital Region (India)
- List of rapid transit systems
- List of metro systems
