= Okhla Vihar metro station =

Metro station in Delhi, India

Okhla Vihar

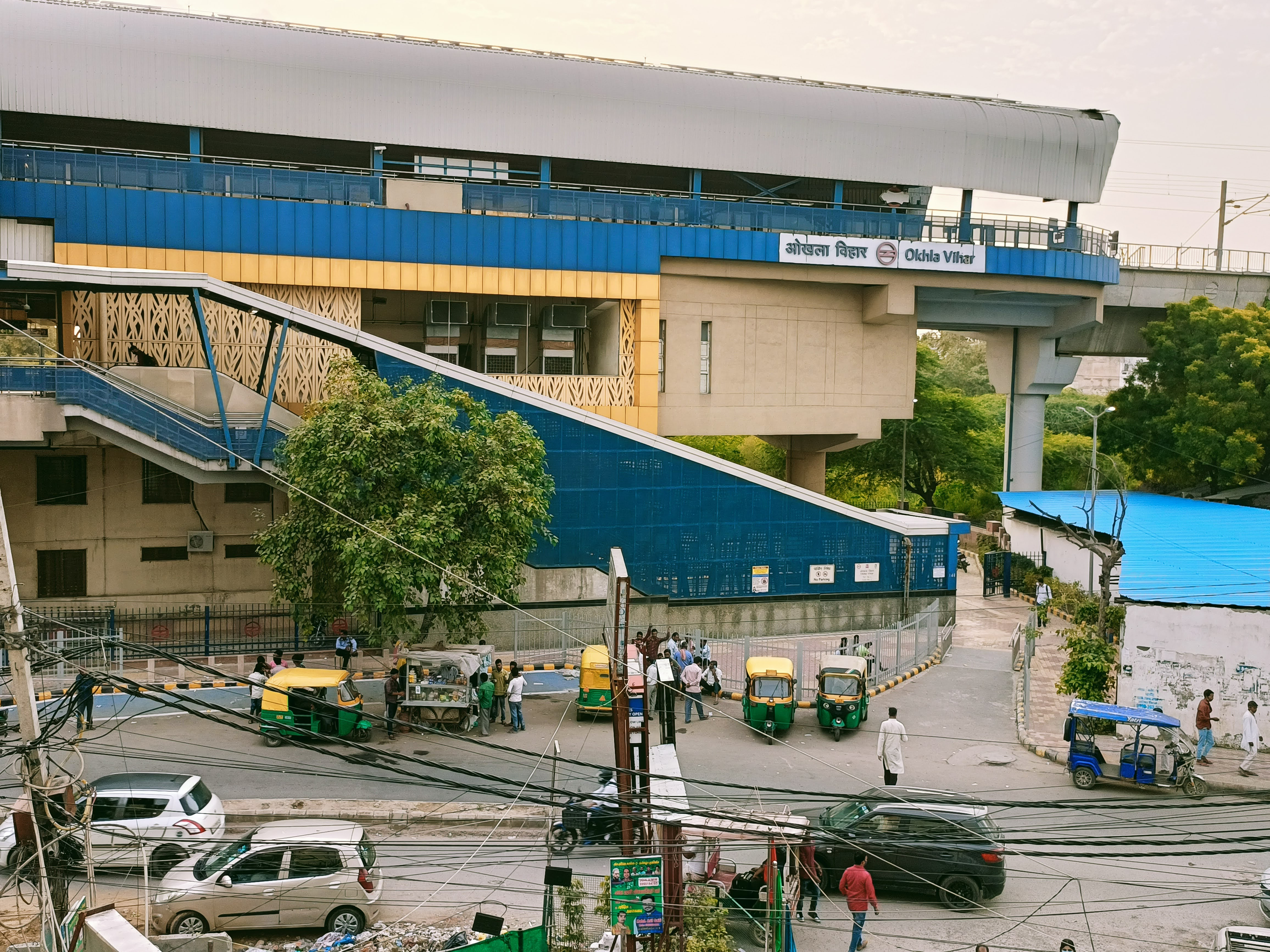

General information
- Location: Hari Kothi Rd, Abul Fazal Enclave, Okhla Vihar, Okhla, New Delhi, Delhi,110025
- Coordinates: 28°33′41″N 77°17′31″E
- System: Delhi Metro station
- Owner: Delhi Metro
- Operator: Delhi Metro Rail Corporation (DMRC)
- Line: Magenta Line
- Platforms: Side platform Platform-1 → Botanical Garden; Platform-2 → Inderlok
- Tracks: 2

Construction
- Structure type: Elevated
- Platform levels: 2
- Parking: No
- Accessible: Yes

Other information
- Station code: OVA

History
- Opened: 25 December 2017; 8 years ago
- Electrified: 25 kV 50 Hz AC through overhead catenary

Services
Preceding station	Delhi Metro	Following station
Jamia Millia Islamia towards Inderlok	Magenta Line	Jasola Vihar Shaheen Bagh towards Botanical Garden
Route map
Location

The Okhla Vihar metro station is located on the Magenta Line of the Delhi Metro. It is located in Abul Fazal Enclave just behind Jamia Nagar Police station. This Metro station has three gates. One named as Abul Fazal Enclave Part-I another Hari Kothi Road and the last one as Jamia Nagar Police Station.

As part of Phase III of Delhi Metro, Okhla Vihar is the metro station of the Magenta Line.

== History ==
This station is constructed on the acquired green land of Uttar Pradesh's Irrigation Department, for which hundreds of trees were cut for construction.

=== Construction ===
The construction began in 2014 and the construction contractor was Afcons Infrastructure Limited.

== The station ==
=== Structure ===
Okhla Vihar elevated metro station situated on the Magenta Line of Delhi Metro.

=== Station layout ===
L2	Side platform | Doors will open on the left
L2	Platform 1 East bound	Towards → Botanical Garden; Next Station: Jasola Vihar Shaheen Bagh
L2	Platform 2 Westbound	Towards ← Inderlok; Next Station: Jamia Millia Islamia
L2	Side platform | Doors will open on the left
L1	Concourse	Fare control, station agent, Metro Card vending machines, crossover
G	Street level	Exit/Entrance

=== Facilities ===
List of available ATM at Okhla Vihar metro station are

ICICI Bank ATM
Canara Bank ATM (300m)
Union Bank ATM (200m)

Delhi Metro's dedicated Police station 'Okhla Vihar Metro Police Station' is on the ground floor of this metro station in addition to adjoining Jamia Nagar Police Station.

== Connections ==
Okhla Bus Terminas of Delhi Transport Corporation is adjoining along with Auto Rishshaw Stand.

=== Bus ===
Delhi Transport Corporation's Okhla Bus Terminus is adjoining

== Entry/Exit ==
Okhla Vihar metro station Entry/exits
Gate No-1	Gate No-2	Gate No-3
Nai Basti	Okhla Head Market	Al-Shifa Hospital
Canal Colony	Okhla Village	Shaheen Bagh Graveyard
Jamaat e Islami Hind	TTI, Jamia Millia Islamia	Abul Fazal Enclave
Hotel River View		

== See also ==
- Delhi
- List of Delhi Metro stations
- Transport in Delhi
- Delhi Metro Rail Corporation
- Delhi Suburban Railway
- Delhi Monorail
- Delhi Transport Corporation
- Noida
- Okhla Sanctuary
- Okhla barrage
- Kalindi Kunj
- National Capital Region (India)
- List of rapid transit systems
- List of metro systems
