= New Okhla Barrage =

Dam across the Yamuna River in India

- Interactive map of New Okhla Barrage
- Coordinates: 28.5459054°N 77.310927°E
- Purpose: Irrigation
- Construction began: 1979
- Opening date: 1987

Dam and spillways
- Impounds: Yamuna River
- Length: 550 m

The New Ohkla Barrage is a weir impounding the Yamuna River, southeast of New Delhi.

The nature of the Yamanu River has changed substantially since the British built the original Okhla barrage in 1874. The river was known for its fish abundance. Today the river is fed mostly by the outflow of water treatment plants. The New Okla Barrage has been full to capacity only four times since it was commissioned in 1987.

== See also ==
- Barrages
  - Hathni Kund Barrage
  - Okhla barrage
  - Masani barrage
  - Tajewala Barrage
- Wetlands
  - Basai Wetland
  - Najafgarh drain bird sanctuary
  - Sahibi River
  - Sultanpur National Park
