= Palla barrage =

Palla Barrage
- Location within Haryana Location within India
- Country: India
- Location: Faridabad district
- Coordinates: 28.470951°N 77.318216°E
- Opening date: ?
- Owner: Haryana Irrigation Department

The Palla barrage is a barrage located in Palla on the Yamuna-Faridabad canal in Faridabad district of Haryana state in India. This irrigation canal runs to the west of Yaumna through Fridabad, Palwal, Mathura and Agra districts where it terminates in the farms. Palla, Faridabad is not to be confused with Palla, Delhi, a Yamuna pollution monitoring station 23 km upstream of Wazirabad barrage.

== Yamuna National Waterway NW110 ==
Palla is part of National Waterway NW110, one of India's 111 National Waterways. It lies on Delhi-Faridabad Okhla-Palla Yaumna Canal waterway, from Okhla barrage south of Delhi to Palla barrage north-west of Faridabad. A detailed Project Report was ready to build new barrages in 2 places, dredge Yaumna from Palla to Wazirabad with a water draft of 3 meter, to operate seaplanes, seabuses and hovercraft (c. June 2016). A 2013 plan had a proposal to build "New Wazirabad barrage" 8 km north of the current Wazirabad barrage.

== Western Yamuna Canal National Highway ==
Western Yamuna Canal National Highway, to ease the congestion on NH1, Haryana govt sent the plans to construct a new highway from Yamuna Nagar to Palla barrage to Ministry of Housing and Urban Affairs, NCR Planning Board and Ministry of Road Transport and Highways, Haryana in turn was requested to submit the Detailed Project Report (DPR) (c. Aug 2017). Haryana cabinet had approved the budget to prepare the DPR. This 100-metre wide INR1,500 crore project, with 90:10 centre-state funding, will have 4 railway over bridges, 10 road flyovers, run 20 meter away from the river bed along the Western Yamuna Canal.

It will intersect NH-1 at Karnal, NH-71, State Highway# 7, Karnal-Kaithal State Highway# 8, Karnal-Kachwa-Samli-Kaul State Highway# 9, Panipat-Jind State Highway# 14 and Kond-Munak-Salwan-Asandh District Road MDR# 114.

== Concerns ==
=== Pollution ===
Pollution, mainly from untreated sewage remains a major concern, especially after the Wazirabad barrage in Delhi, due to the discharge of waste water through 15 drains between Wazirabad and Okhla barrages. Top 3 causes are, household sewage, industrial and commercial affluents, agricultural chemical wash off and soil erosion from deforestation.

=== Destruction of floodplains by landsharks ===
Landsharks destroyed and significantly shrank Yamuna's floodplains by 15 hectares on a 4-km stretch from Okhla Barrage to Jaitpur village by building farm houses, housing towers, etc.

== See also ==
- Gurugram Bhim Kund (Pinchokhda Jhod)
- Kaushalya Dam barrage at Pinjore
- Bhakra Dam barrage
- Surajkund barrage
- List of dams and reservoirs in Haryana
