= Mithapur, Delhi =

Meethapur
- Neighbourhood of Delhi
- Mithapur
- Location in Delhi City, India
- Coordinates: 28.4973°N 77.318°E
- Country: India
- State: Delhi
- District: South East Delhi
- Founder: MCD Ward in South East Region

Government
  - Type: Councillor- Guddi Devi(2022)
  - Body: Municipal Corporation of Delhi

Population (2001)
  - Total: 41,243
- Demonym: Delhite

Languages
  - Official: Hindi, English
- Time zone: UTC+5:30 (IST)
- Postal code: 110044
- Vehicle registration: DL03

Meethapur or Mithapur is a census town in the South East district of Delhi. India's longest expressway i.e. Delhi-Mumbai Expressway (NH-148NA) passes from this area.

There is a famous crossway in Mithapur which is commonly known as Mithapur Chowk which serves Kalindi Kunj Road, Tanki Road-Jaitpur which connects Badarpur. There is world's biggest ecological park near Mithapur which is known as NTPC Eco Park.

== Demographics ==
As of 2001 India census, Mithapur had a population of 41,243. Males constitute 56% of the population and females 44%. Mithapur has an average literacy rate of 67%, higher than the national average of 59.5%: male literacy is 75%, and female literacy is 56%. In Mithapur, 19% of the population is under 6 years of age.
