= Sukhdev Vihar metro station =

Metro station in Delhi, India

Sukhdev Vihar

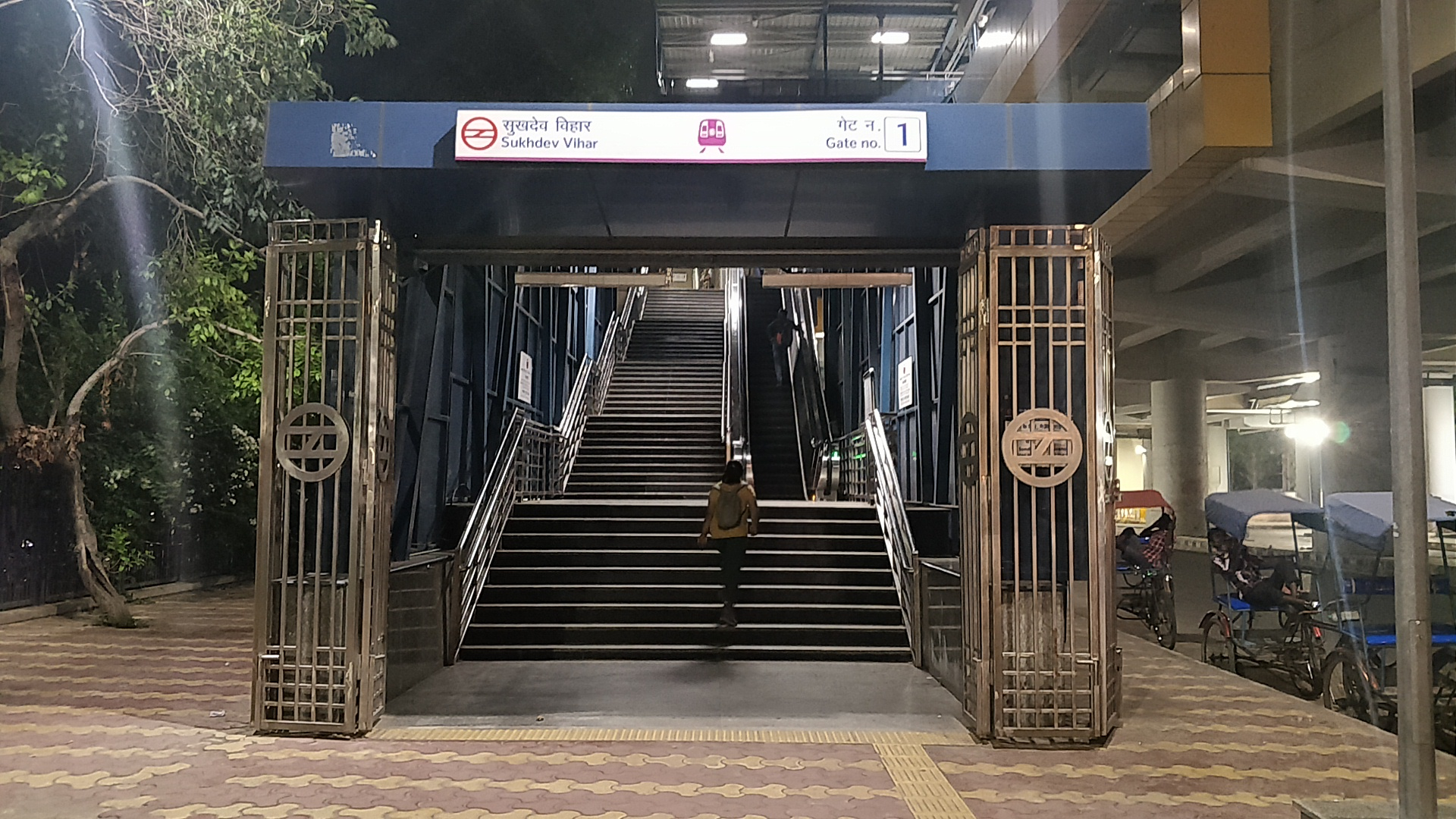

General information
- Location: Masihgarh, Sukhdev Vihar, Okhla, New Delhi, Delhi 110025
- Coordinates: 28°33′35″N 77°16′30″E
- System: Delhi Metro station
- Owner: Delhi Metro
- Operator: Delhi Metro Rail Corporation (DMRC)
- Line: Magenta Line
- Platforms: Side platform Platform-1 → Botanical Garden; Platform-2 → Inderlok
- Tracks: 2

Construction
- Structure type: Elevated
- Platform levels: 2
- Parking: Available
- Accessible: Yes

Other information
- Station code: IWNR

History
- Opened: 25 December 2017; 8 years ago
- Electrified: 25 kV 50 Hz AC through overhead catenary

Services
Preceding station	Delhi Metro	Following station
Okhla NSIC towards Inderlok	Magenta Line	Jamia Millia Islamia towards Botanical Garden
Route map
Location

The Sukhdev Vihar metro station is newly opened located on the Magenta Line of the Delhi Metro and situated at Sukhdev Vihar.

Sukhdev Vihar is a Posh area of south east Delhi and adjoining to New Friends colony.

As part of Phase III of Delhi Metro, Sukhdev Vihar is the newly opened metro station of the Magenta Line.

== The station ==
=== Structure ===
Sukhdev Vihar elevated metro station situated on the Magenta Line of Delhi Metro.

=== Station layout ===
L2	Side platform | Doors will open on the left
L2	Platform 1 East bound	Towards → Botanical Garden; Next Station: Jamia Millia Islamia
L2	Platform 2 Westbound	Towards ← Inderlok; Next Station: Okhla NSIC
L2	Side platform | Doors will open on the left
L1	Concourse	Fare control, station agent, Metro Card vending machines, crossover
G	Street Level	Exit/Entrance

=== Facilities ===
First Aid Room and Toilet

== Entry/Exit ==
Sukhdev Vihar metro station Entry/exits
Gate No-1
Gate No-2
Gate No-3
Gate No-4
Fortis Escorts Hospital
Sarai Jullena
Sukhdev Vihar
Masihgarh
The Ardee School
Faculty of Engineering and Technology, Jamia Millia Islamia

 Sukhdev Vihar

== Connections ==
=== Bus ===
Delhi Transport Corporation bus routes number 463, 534, 534A serves the station.

== See also ==
- Delhi
- List of Delhi Metro stations
- Transport in Delhi
- Delhi Metro Rail Corporation
- Delhi Suburban Railway
- Delhi Monorail
- Delhi Transport Corporation
- South East Delhi
- Jamia Millia Islamia
- Okhla Sanctuary
- Okhla railway station
- National Capital Region (India)
- List of rapid transit systems
- List of metro systems
