= Pamposh Enclave =

- Neighborhood of Delhi
- Country: India
- State: Delhi

Languages
  - Official: Hindi
- Time zone: UTC+5:30 (IST)

Pamposh Enclave is a residential colony in GK in south Delhi, India.

== Background ==
It shares its borders with other enclaves such as Nehru Place, Chirag Enclave, Hemkunt Colony, Greater Kailash Enclave-1 Chittaranjan Park and Kalkaji. The colony has three playgrounds and two temples. One temple is known as Shiv Mandir and the other is known as Gopinath Ashram. The colony also has an education center and a library run by Kashmir Education Culture & Science Society (KECSS).

The colony has many trees and is very neat and clean. The colony has a hospital named Sukhda Hospital and a shopping complex called Gurunanak Market. There has been concern about unauthorized structures and commercialisation of residential colonies in Delhi.
