= Greater Kailash =

- Neighbourhood of Delhi
- Location in Delhi, India
- Coordinates: 28.544342°N 77.23971°E
- Country: India
- State: Delhi
- District: South Delhi

Languages
  - Official: Hindi and English
- Time zone: UTC+5:30 (IST)
- PIN: 110 048
- Planning agency: MCD

Greater Kailash (often referred to as GK) is a residential area in South Delhi consisting of several neighbourhoods and multiple markets. It is divided into three zones, namely part 1, 2, and 3, located around a section of the Outer Ring Road. The neighbourhood registered a 4.4% growth in residential sales.

== Greater Kailash 1 ==
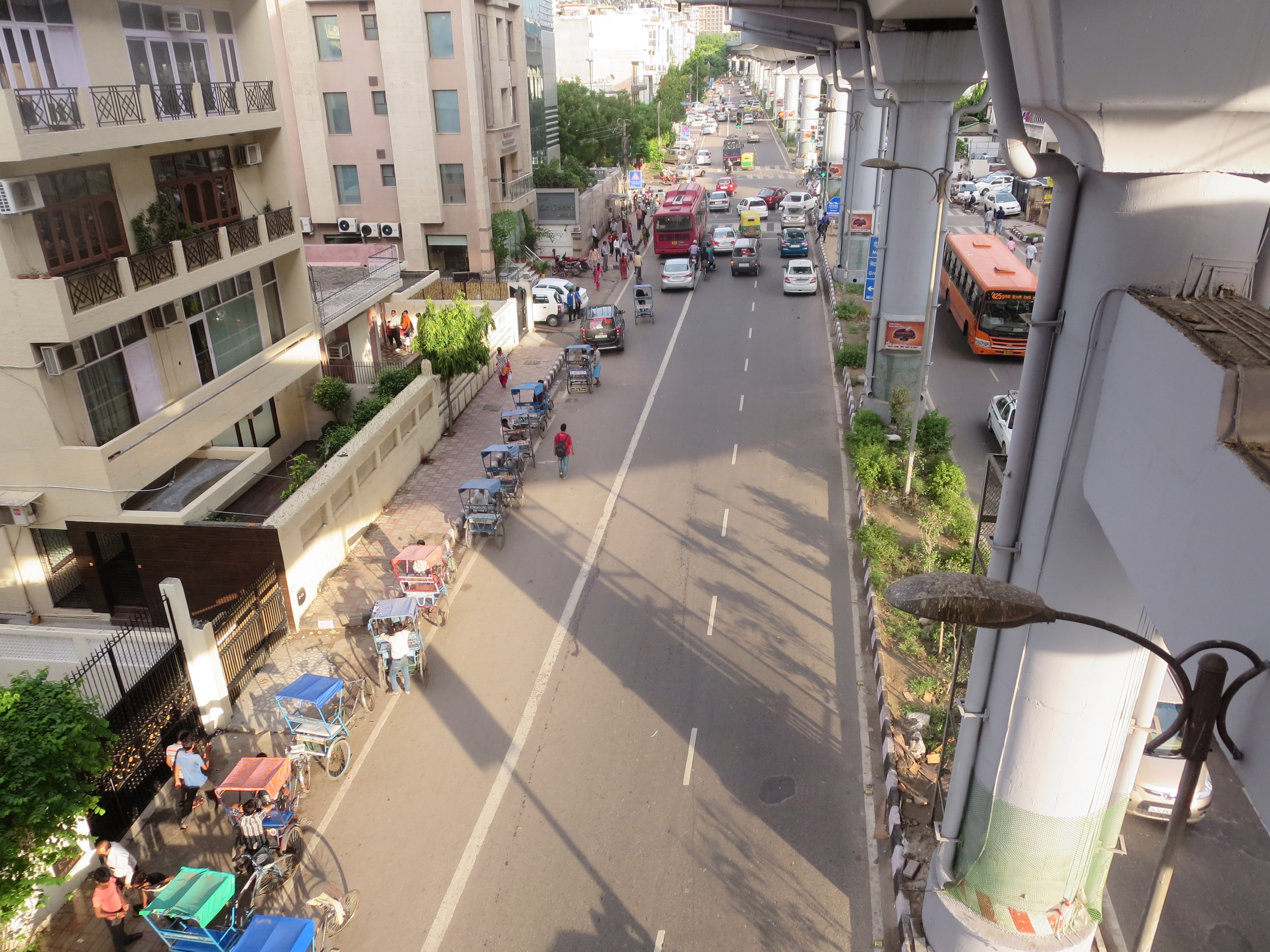
Main road in Greater Kailash-1 as seen from foot over bridge of Kailash Colony Metro Station

Greater Kailash-I (GK‑I) was developed on land acquired from the villages of Zamrudpur and Devli Gaon. The area was formerly agricultural land, producing rich Kharif yields, and was owned by around 90 farmers. It was acquired by the Government of India in 1955 under a large-scale land acquisition plan and later developed into a residential colony by the Delhi Development Authority and private developers. Today, the colony is home to well-known politicians, business personalities and people associated with Bollywood industry. GK-1 markets in M and N Block are some of the most popular markets among Delhites and tourists because of its wide range of shopping, restaurants, bars, etc.

== Greater Kailash Part 2 ==
The development of Greater Kailash-I was followed by the expansion of Greater Kailash Part II, which has easier accessibility to the Outer Ring Road of New Delhi. M-Block, GK II is a popular market, with many restaurants, coffee shops, sanitary shops and beauty salons. It is one of the largest hubs for sanitary ware in Northern India. Recently the market has experienced heavy footfall due to several restaurants, salons and banks.

== Greater Kailash Part 3 ==
The development of Greater Kailash-II has also led to its expansion into Greater Kailash-III, now bordering GK-II and adjacent to the Greater Kailash Metro station.

== Real estate ==
Established in the early 1960s, the Greater Kailash locality has two metro stations on the violet and magenta lines. It has its own prime market which hosts numerous opulent salons, boutiques and eating joints. Property prices have always been high in this borough due to the numerous facilities available. Builder floors and independent villas cost anywhere between ₹60–250 million (US$800,000–9,000,000). Rental rates are also very high due to which this residential area is among the most expensive places in New Delhi.

== In popular culture ==
With time, Greater Kailash has become synonymous with good living and good neighbourhood. In 2022 Indian Hindi-language horror comedy film Bhediya, after both the protagonist Bhaskar and his love interest Dr. Anika — a veterinarian — realize that he is suffering from a physical form of lycanthropy, Dr. Anika hints that he should return to his home. Upon hearing this, Bhaskar exclaims that he is fighting to have a better living — मेरी लड़ाई जमना पार (signifying an ordinary living) से जीके (GK or Greater Kailash, signifying a decent living) पहुंचने की है. In the popular Indian sitcom Sumit Sambhal Lega, the protagonist Sumit and his family live in Greater Kailash, and it's often mentioned in the show.

== Educational institutions ==
- Balvantray Mehta Vidya Bhawan Anguridevi Shersingh Memorial Academy
- Summer Fields School
- K R Mangalam

== Accessibility ==
- Domestic Airport is 17 km (11 mi) from Greater Kailash.
- International Airport (IGI) is 22 km (14 mi) from Greater Kailash.
- Nizamuddin railway station is 9 km (5.6 mi) from Greater Kailash.
- New Delhi railway station is 15 km (9.3 mi) from Greater Kailash.

== Contiguous neighbourhoods ==
- East of Kailash
- Nehru Place
- Lajpat Nagar
- Kalkaji
- Chittaranjan Park
- Masjid Moth
- Kailash Colony
- Sant Nagar
- Pamposh Enclave
- Hemkunt Colony
- Chirag Enclave
- Siri Fort Road
- Alaknanda
- Tughlaqabad Extension
- Govindpuri
