= Johri Farm =

Johri Farms Noor Nagar Extension
- neighbourhood
- Interactive map of Johri Farms
- Coordinates: 28°34′9.9732″N 77°17′1.014″E
- Country: India
- State: Delhi
- District: South East Delhi
- Jamia Millia Islamia Metro: New Delhi

Languages
  - Regional: Hindi, English, Urdu

Ethnicity
- Time zone: UTC+5:30 (IST)
- PIN: 110025
- Telephone code: +91
- ISO 3166 code: [[ISO 3166-2:IN|]]

Johri Farm is a new settlement in Jamia Nagar, New Delhi, India, in the district of South East Delhi.
