= K R Mangalam World School =

K.R. Mangalam World School
- Delhi, India

Information
- School type: Private
- Motto: Engage. Learn. Innovate.
- Established: 2004
- Faculty: Fulltime
- Houses: Emerald, Ruby, Sapphire and Topaz
- Affiliations: CBSE
- Website: http://www.krmangalam.com

K.R. Mangalam Group is an Indian private educational organisation that operates a network of schools and a university, primarily in the Delhi National Capital Region and neighbouring states. The group traces its origins to Summer Fields School in Kailash Colony, New Delhi, established in 1953. It expanded into the K.R. Mangalam World School chain beginning with the Greater Kailash-II campus in 2004 and later founded K.R. Mangalam University in Gurugram in 2013 under the Haryana Private Universities Act.

As of the mid-2020s, the group runs multiple CBSE-affiliated World Schools and one International Baccalaureate (IB) school, along with the university. Campuses are located in Delhi, Gurugram, Ghaziabad, Greater Noida, Faridabad, Bahadurgarh, Panipat, Lucknow and other nearby areas.

== History ==
The K.R. Mangalam Group began its journey in school education with Summer Fields School in 1953, followed by the establishment of K.R. Mangalam World School, Greater Kailash II, New Delhi, in 2004. The group expanded in the following years with campuses in Vikaspuri in 2005 and Paschim Vihar in 2006, strengthening its presence in Delhi.

In 2010, the group opened K.R. Mangalam World School, Gurugram, marking its entry into Haryana. This was followed by the Vaishali campus in 2012. In 2013, the group established K.R. Mangalam University in Gurugram, extending its work from school education into higher education.

Further school campuses were opened in Sonipat in 2014, Greater Noida in 2016, Faridabad in 2017, and K.R. Mangalam Global School in Greater Kailash I in 2018. The network continued to grow with campuses in Bahadurgarh and Panipat in 2023, as well as in Noida Extension, Knowledge Park V, and Lucknow in 2025. Over two decades, the K.R. Mangalam Group has developed into a multi-campus education network of schools and a university, with a focus on academic instruction and holistic student development.

== List of K.R. Mangalam Group of Schools ==
Image	Campus	Location	Established	Curriculum	Notes / Website
Front view of Summer Fields School, Kailash Colony, Greater Kailash-I, New Delhi	Summer Fields School	Kailash Colony, Greater Kailash-I, New Delhi	1953	CBSE	Oldest institution associated with the group
Front view of K.R. Mangalam World School, Greater Kailash-II, New Delhi	K.R. Mangalam World School	Greater Kailash-II, New Delhi	2004	CBSE	krmangalamgk2.com
Front view of K.R. Mangalam World School, Vikaspuri, New Delhi	K.R. Mangalam World School	Vikaspuri, New Delhi	2005	CBSE	krmangalamvikaspuri.com
Front view of K.R. Mangalam World School, Paschim Vihar, New Delhi	K.R. Mangalam World School	Paschim Vihar, New Delhi	2006	CBSE	Junior wing linked to Vikaspuri campus
Front view of K.R. Mangalam World School, South City-I, Gurugram, Haryana	K.R. Mangalam World School	Gurugram (South City-I), Haryana	2010	CBSE	krmangalamgurgaon.com
Front view of K.R. Mangalam World School, Vaishali, Ghaziabad, Uttar Pradesh	K.R. Mangalam World School	Vaishali, Ghaziabad, Uttar Pradesh	2012	CBSE	krmangalamvaishali.com
Front view of K.R. Mangalam World School, TDI City, Kundli, Sonipat, Haryana	K.R. Mangalam World School	TDI City, Kundli, Sonipat, Haryana	2014	CBSE	krmangalamsonipat.com
Front view of K.R. Mangalam World School, Knowledge Park V, Noida Extension, Uttar Pradesh	K.R. Mangalam World School	Greater Noida, Uttar Pradesh	2016	CBSE	krmangalamgn.com
Front view of K.R. Mangalam World School, Faridabad, Haryana	K.R. Mangalam World School	Faridabad, Haryana	2017	CBSE	krmwsfaridabad.com
Front view of K.R. Mangalam Global School, Greater Kailash-I, New Delhi	K.R. Mangalam Global School	Greater Kailash-I, New Delhi	2018	IB	krmangalam.global
Front view of K.R. Mangalam World School, Bahadurgarh, Haryana	K.R. Mangalam World School	Bahadurgarh, Haryana	2023	CBSE	krmangalambahadurgarh.com
Front view of K.R. Mangalam World School, Panipat, Haryana	K.R. Mangalam World School	Panipat, Haryana	2023	CBSE	krmangalampanipat.com
Front view of K.R. Mangalam World School, Lucknow, Uttar Pradesh	K.R. Mangalam World School	Lucknow, Uttar Pradesh	2025	CBSE	krmangalamlucknow.com
Front view of K.R. Mangalam World School, Knowledge Park V, Noida Extension, Uttar Pradesh	K.R. Mangalam World School	Knowledge Park V, Noida Extension, Uttar Pradesh	2025	CBSE	krmangalamnoidaextn.com
	K.R. Mangalam World School	Sector 2, Noida Extension	Planned 2027	—	Upcoming campus

== Houses ==
Each house is headed by one boy and one girl known as house captains. A member of the staff assisted by several other teachers acts as the house mistress. Points are awarded to the house on the basis of display boards, maintenance of discipline, news, thoughts etc. There are four houses: ruby, sapphire, emerald and topaz. Inter House competitions are organized throughout the year.

== The Confluence ==
The Vikas Puri Branch was first to organise an Inter-School Competitive Event by the name of The Confluence. The cultural event holds numerous competitions varying from the field of drama, music, dance, computer, science, literature, mathematics, business, etc.

=== The Confluence Club ===
Each year, this event is organised and managed by a group of Senior Students, together called as The Confluence Club

- Core 2011-12 - Siddhant Gupta, Archit Goel, Rohan Shorey, Poorva Gupta, Lakshi Aggarwal, Siddhant Puri, Poonam Chawla.
- Core 2012-13 - Chiranjeev Singh, Anaghaa Bhalla, Harnaman Mehta, Gurkirat Singh Gill, Mehak Bhari, Niharika Pagore, Rohan Kwatra, Sahil Aggarwal and Shreya Chopra
- Core 2013-14 - Syalli Kaur, Katyayn Sharma, Shubham Puri, Ishani Khanna, Simran Kalsi, Punya Kapoor, Harmeet Singh, Rohan Mangla, Aashima Sawhney, Amaanee Dhanjal
- Core 2014-15 - Kshitij Singh, Divyanshu Sayal, Rishabh Chadha, Tanya Sethi, Divya Aggarwal, Aishwarya Mittal, Hardik Deep Chawla, Ishjot Mehta, Aseem Malik, Medha Sharma, Arshdeep Kaur
- Core 2022-23 - Saksham Miglani, Angad Singh Basu, Iddham Kumar, Naunidh Singh Kohli, Manya Bhatnagar, Baani Kapoor, Akshara Tomar, Shorya Kumar, Isheet Singh

== K.R. Mangalam University ==
K.R. Mangalam University is a private university in Gurugram, Haryana, established in 2013 by the K.R. Mangalam Group under the Haryana Private Universities (Amendment) Act, 2013. It marked the group’s expansion from school education into higher education. The university is located on Sohna Road, Gurugram, on a campus of about 35 acres. It is recognised by the University Grants Commission (UGC) under Section 2(f) of the UGC Act, 1956, and is empowered to award degrees under Section 22 of the Act.

The university has been accredited with an ‘A’ grade by the National Assessment and Accreditation Council (NAAC). K.R. Mangalam University offers undergraduate, postgraduate, doctoral and diploma programmes across multiple disciplines, including engineering, management, law, architecture, pharmacy, education, sciences, humanities and other professional fields. Programme approvals and recognitions include bodies such as the Bar Council of India (BCI), Pharmacy Council of India (PCI), Council of Architecture (COA) and the National Council for Teacher Education (NCTE), as applicable to specific courses.

The university forms part of the wider K.R. Mangalam Group network of schools and higher-education institutions in Delhi-NCR and other regions.
