= Okhla barrage =

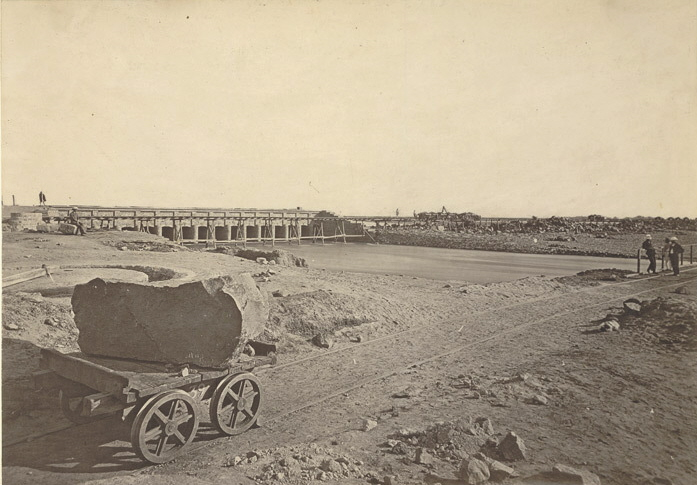
- Agra Canal headworks at Okhla (c. 1871)

- Location within Delhi Location within India
- Country: India
- Location: Okhla in Delhi
- Coordinates: 28.565°N 77.303°E
- Status: Functional
- Opening date: 1874

Dam and spillways
- Length: 791 m (2,595 ft)

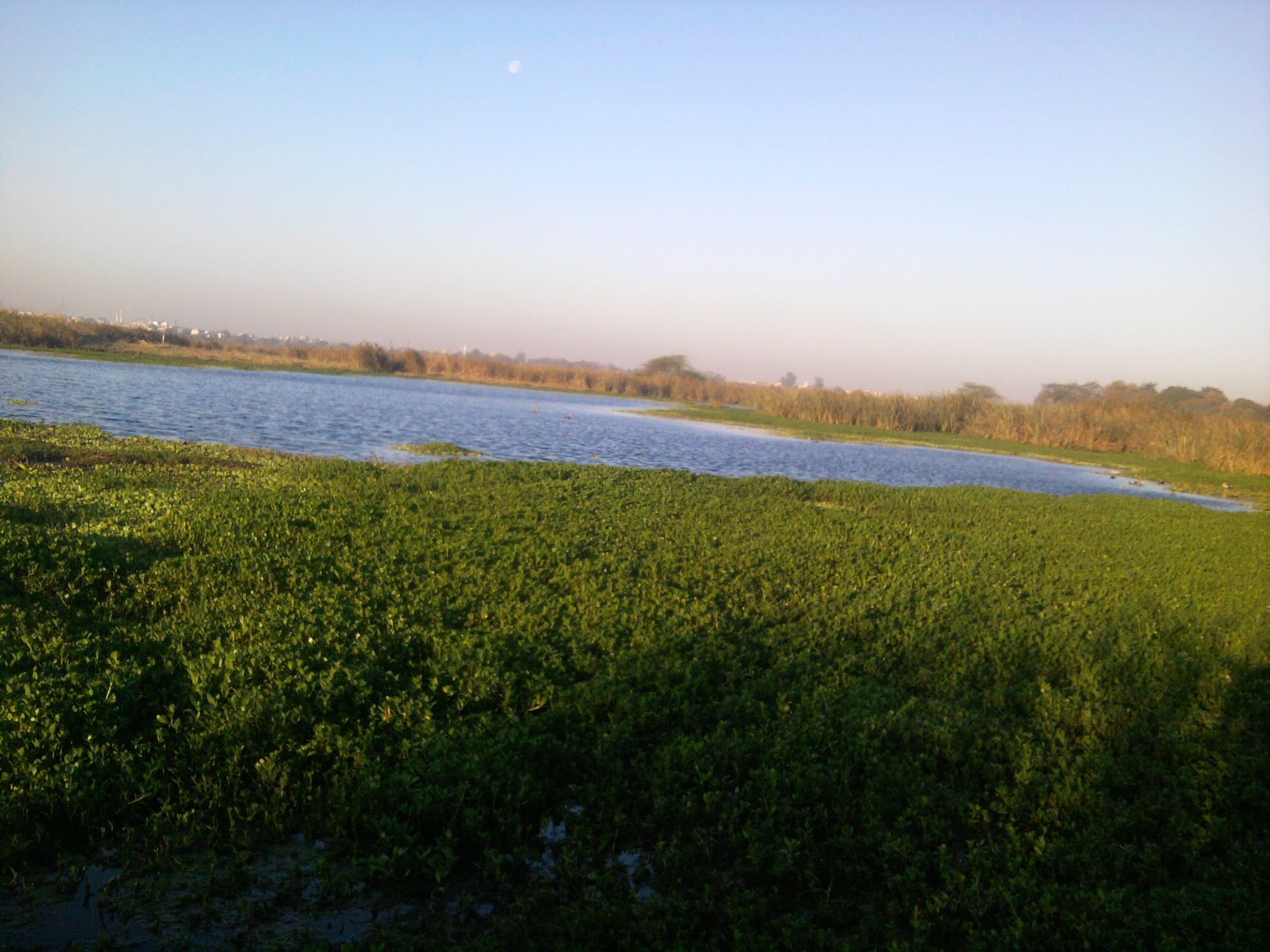
View of Yamuna River from barrage

The Okhla barrage (Okhla Weir and Okhla bridge) is a 791 meters or roughly 800-yard long weir across Yamuna River opened in 1874. It also serves as the location of Okhla Bird Sanctuary today. It is situated 10 km to the south of New Delhi and downstream of Nizamuddin bridge at Okhla, where Agra canal originates from it. The top of barrage also serves as the Delhi-Noida carriageway of Kalindi Kunj-Mithapur road. Nearby later-era New Okhla Barrage is 554 meters long.

It is under the management of the government of Uttar Pradesh.

== History ==
The barrage and Agra canal were opened in 1874 by the British Raj for the purpose of irrigation and water navigation from Delhi to Gurgaon, Mathura and Agra districts, and Bharatpur State. Navigation stopped in 1904. It was built seven-feet higher than the summer level of the river.

The Yamuna, from its origin at Yamunotri to Okhla barrage, is called Upper Yamuna which is managed by Upper Yamuna River Board created in 1995. Yamuna flows for 48 km in Delhi, including 22 km from Wazirabad barrage where it enters Delhi to Okhla barrage after which it enters Haryana. Upstream barrages in Delhi are Wazirabad barrage (north) and ITO barrage (center).

A canal was built from Okhla barrage to Gurugram district (now Faridabad) during the 3rd Five-Year Plans of India (1961-66). That canal now has a downstream Palla barrage in Faridabad.

== Bird Sanctuary ==
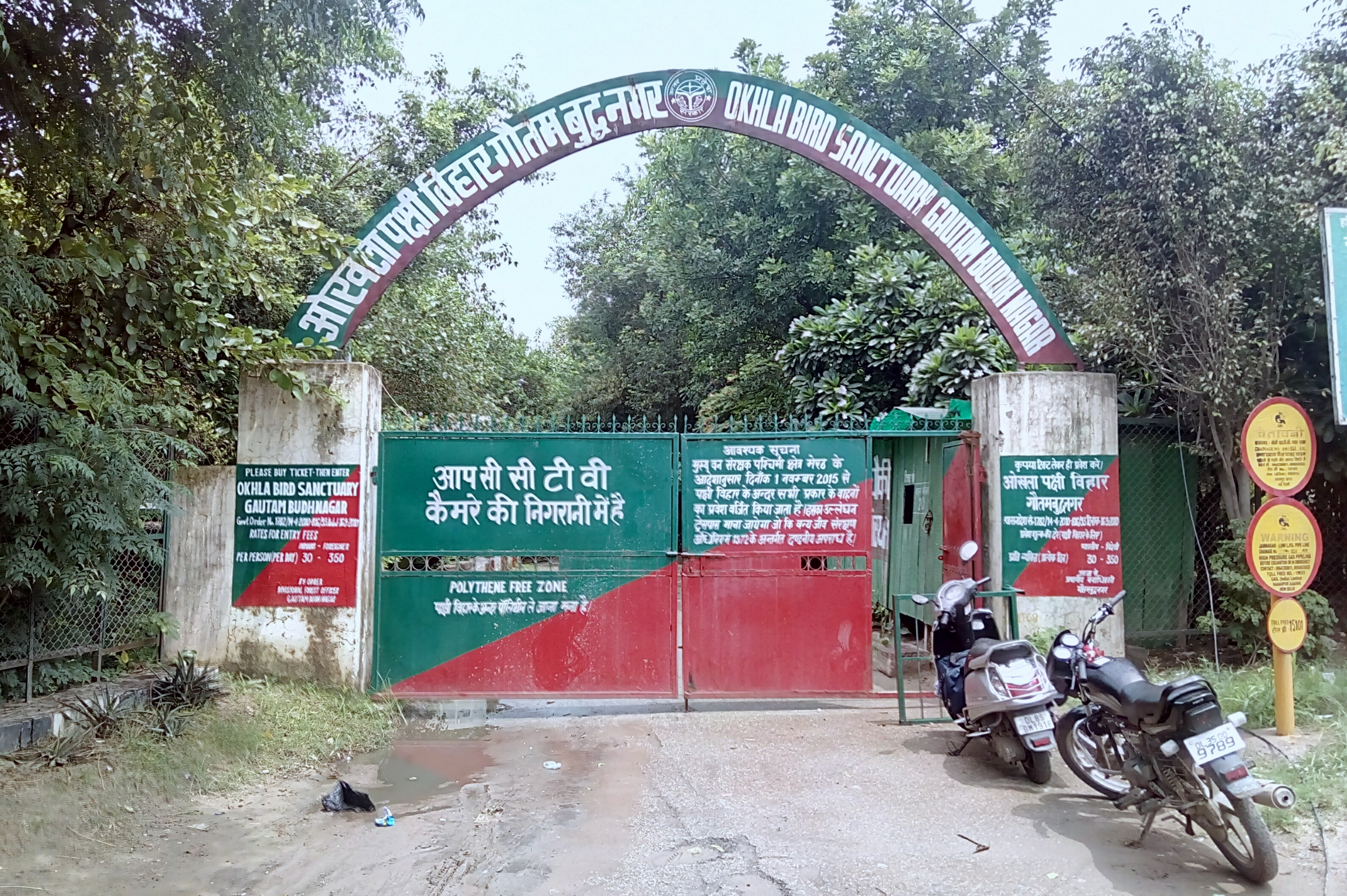
Okhla Bird Sanctuary entry gate near Noida.

Okhla barrage now also serves as the location of Okhla Bird Sanctuary. Downstream on Agra canal is also Keetham Lake National Bird Sanctuary.

== Preservation ==
The road over the barrage was shut for 45 days in September 2017, for repairs to 18 of its 27 water release gates, prior to the arrival of migratory birds in November.

== Navigation restoration ==
This barrage on Yamuna is part of National Waterway NW110, one of India's 111 National Waterways. Okhla barrage lies on the following two under-development waterways projects.

- Delhi-Faridabad Yaumna waterway, from Wazirabad barrage in north Delhi to Palla barrage in north Faridabad via ITO barrage and Okhla barrage.
- Delhi-Agra Yamuna canal waterway, from Okhla barrage to Agra via Agra Canal, steamer service is planned by the end of June 2017 with the help of Netherlands (c. Feb 2017).

== See also ==
- Mathura barrage
- Masani barrage
- New Okhla Barrage
