= East of Kailash =

- Neighborhood of Delhi
- Location in Delhi, India
- Coordinates: 28.5583°N 77.2531°E
- Country: India
- State: Delhi
- District: South Delhi
- Metro: New Delhi

Languages
  - Official: Hindi
- Time zone: UTC+5:30 (IST)
- Postal code: 110065
- Planning agency: MCD

East of Kailash is a residential neighborhood in South Delhi, India.

== Neighborhoods ==
Its neighboring areas are Kailash Colony, Kailash Hills, Mount Kailash Apartments, Greater Kailash, Lajpat Nagar.

== Attractions ==
Image of a sculpture of Krishna dancing on Kaliya Demon installed at ISKCON Radha Parthasarathi Mandir, New Delhi

Famous ISCON Radha Parthasarathi Mandir is situated in this locality. The temple complex holds both the biggest printed religious book in the world as well as the Glory of India Vedic Cultural centre, a collection of engaging educational exhibitions, known as the "Astounding Bhagavad Gita".
