= Wazirabad barrage =

Coordinates: 28.712448°N 77.233184°E

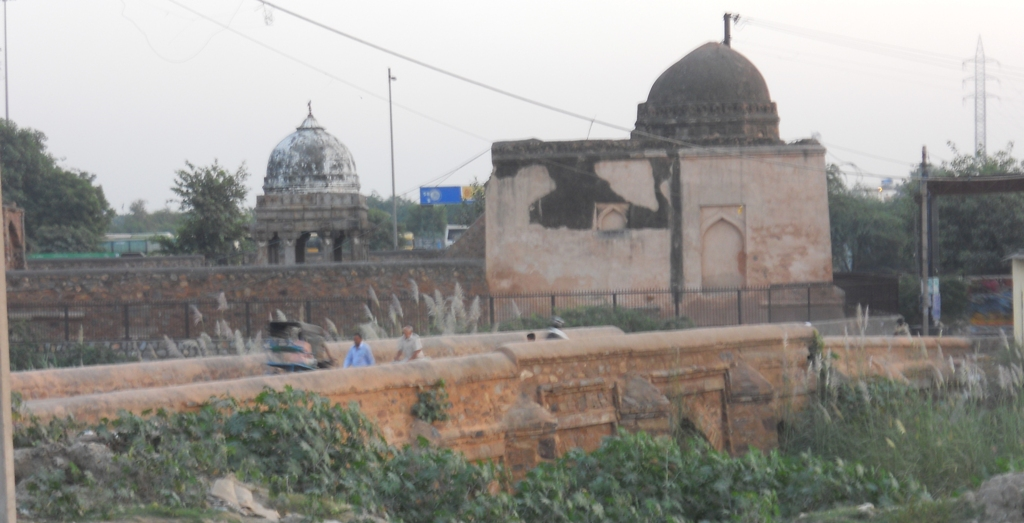
- Wazirabad bridge on Sahibi River

- Location within Delhi
- Country: India
- Location: Wazirabad, Delhi
- Status: Functional
- Opening date: 1959

Dam and spillways
- Length: 1,491 ft (454 m)

The Wazirabad barrage or Wazirabad bridge, built in 1959 is a 1,491 ft long weir across Yamuna River in Wazirabad, Delhi. ITO barrage and Okhla barrage are 2 downstream barrages in Delhi and are managed by Haryana and UP respectively, whereas the Wazirabad barrage is under the management of Delhi govt.

== History ==
It was built in 1959 to supply drinking water to the city of Delhi.

== Technical details ==
It is a 1,491 ft long barrage with 6 under-sluices of 60 ft each on the right side and a 17 bays spillway of 58 ft each. The top of the spillway is 4 ft. higher than the under-sluices. There is a concrete floor flexible apron, both upstream and down-stream.

== Proposal for New Wazirabad barrage ==
A March 2013 proposal for Delhi envisages building a "New Wazirabad barrage" 8 km north of the current barrage, that will utilize the existing eastern and western boundary margins of the current barrage, will serve as the bridge over the Yamuna and flanks will serve as road expressways.

== Navigation restoration ==
This barrage on Yaumna is part of National Waterway NW110, one of India's 111 National Waterways. The barrage lies on the Delhi-Faridabad Yaumna waterway, from Wazirabad barrage in north Delhi to Palla barrage in north Faridabad via ITO barrage and Okhla barrage.

== Bird Sanctuary ==
The Najafgarh drain bird sanctuary lies in the vicinity. The 51 km-long Najafgarh drain (named after Mirza Najaf Khan 1723–82) starts at Dhansa and joins the Yamuna river just downstream of Wazirabad barrage. Sanctuary has helped in the improvement in water quality, restoration of groundwater recharge and in providing wetland for the migratory birds.

== Concerns ==
Yamuna, from its origin at Yamunotri in Himalayas to Wazirabad barrage, travels 375 kilometres (233 mi) carrying "reasonably good quality" water. Between Wazirabad and Okhla barrage, 15 drains discharge sewage, rendering the water quality after Wazirabad barrage severely polluted with high coliform content and biochemical oxygen demand (BOD) values ranging from 14 to 28 mg/L. Causes of pollution are municipal disposal sites, run-off from the commercial and industrial sites, soil erosion resulting from deforestation occurring to make way for agriculture along with resulting chemical wash-off from petrochemical fertilizers, herbicides, and pesticides.

== See also ==
- Basai Wetland
- Hathni Kund Barrage
- Tajewala Barrage
- Najafgarh drain bird sanctuary
- Sultanpur National Park
