= Agra Canal =

Irrigation canal near Delhi, India

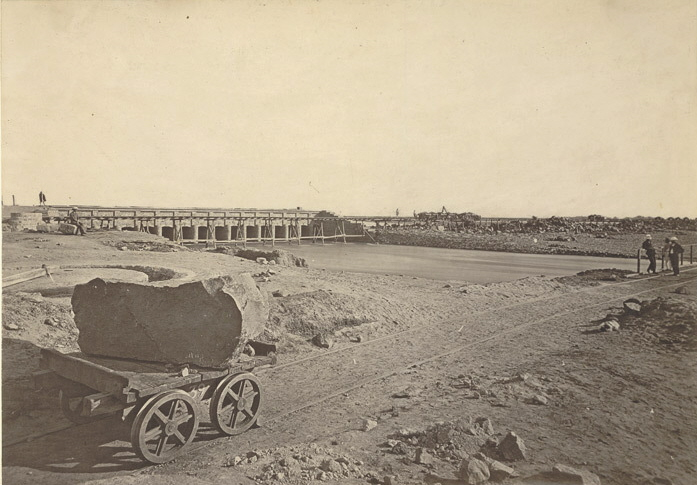
- Agra Canal headworks, at Okhla barrage, in Delhi, 1871.

- Location within India
- Country: India

Specifications
- Length: 140 miles (230 km)
- Lock length: 120 ft
- Lock width: 20 ft (6.1 m)
- Locks: One
- Maximum height AMSL: 659 ft (201 m)

History
- Construction began: 1868
- Date completed: 1874
- Date closed: 1904

Geography
- Start point: Okhla barrage
- Beginning coordinates: 28°34′N 77°18′E

The Agra Canal is an important Indian irrigation work which starts from Okhla in Delhi. The Agra canal originates at the Okhla barrage, downstream of Nizamuddin bridge.

The canal receives its water from the Yamuna River at Okhla, about 10 kilometres (6.2 mi) to the south of New Delhi. The weir across the Yamuna was constructed of locally quarried stone. It was about 800 yards (730 m) long, and rises seven feet above the summer level of the river.

From Okhla the canal follows a route south then southeast for 140 miles (230 km) in the high land between the Khari-Nadi and the Yamuna and finally joins the Utanga River about 27 miles (43 km) below Agra. Navigable branches connect the canal with Mathura and Agra. The canal irrigates about 150,000 hectares (370,000 acres) in Agra, and Mathura in Uttar Pradesh, Faridabad in Haryana, Bharatpur in Rajasthan and also some parts of Delhi.

== History ==
The canal opened in the year 1874. In the beginning, it was available for navigation, in Delhi, erstwhile Gurgaon, Mathura and Agra Districts, and Bharatpur State. Later, navigation was stopped in 1904 and the canal has, since then, been exclusively used for irrigation purposes only. At present, the canal does not flow in Gurgaon district, but only in Faridabad, which was earlier a part of Gurgaon.

In recent times, Agra canal is an important landmark which separates Greater Faridabad from Faridabad.
