= Okhla Sanctuary =

Bird sanctuary in Noida, Uttar Pradesh, India

- IUCN category IV (habitat/species management area)
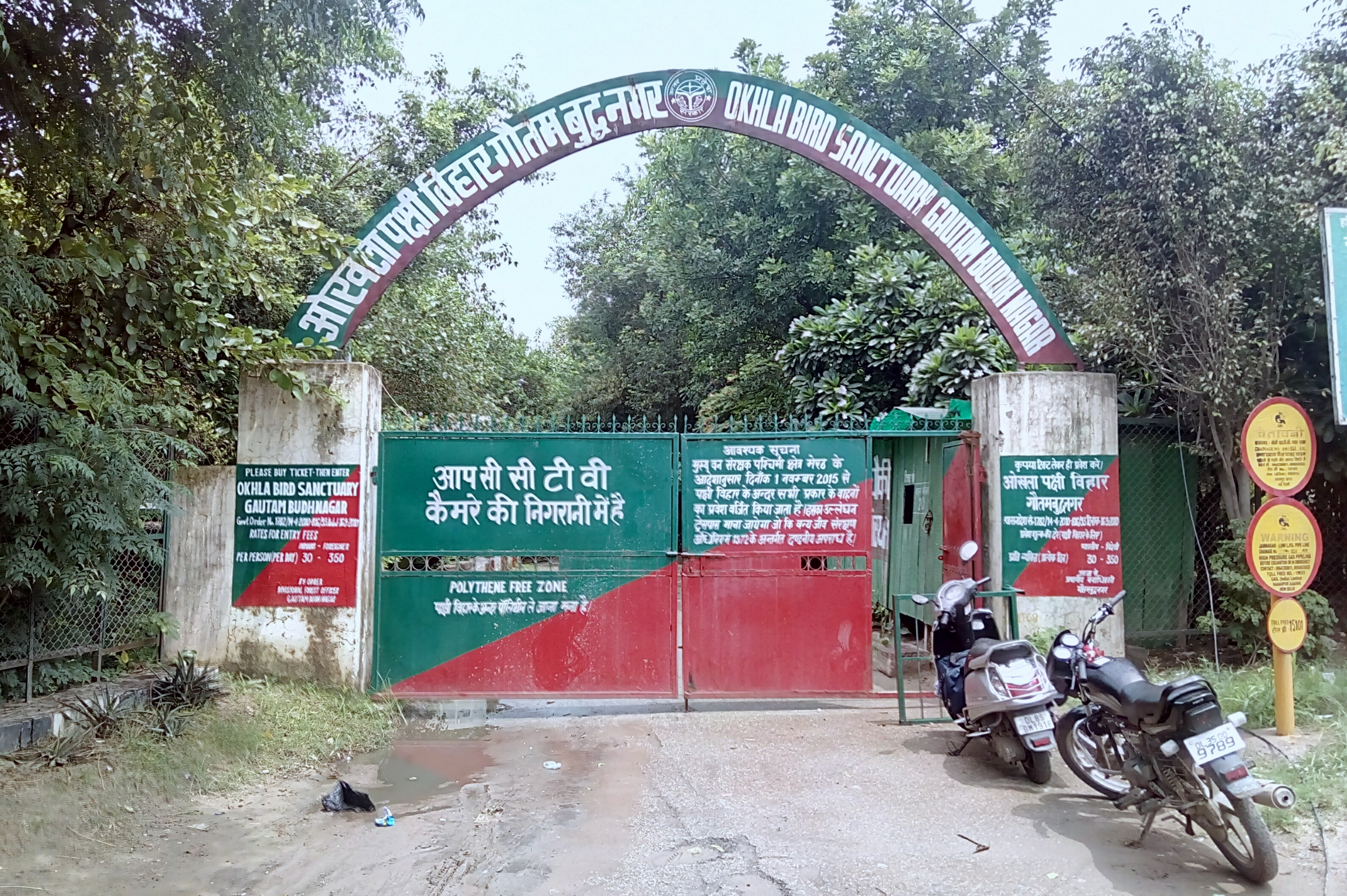

- Location within Uttar Pradesh Location within India
- Interactive map of Okhla Sanctuary
- Location: Noida, Gautam Buddh Nagar district, Uttar Pradesh, India
- Nearest city: Noida
- Coordinates: 28.565°N 77.303°E
- Area: 3.5 square kilometres (1.4 sq mi)
- Established: 1990
- Governing body: Government of India

Okhla Bird Sanctuary is a bird sanctuary at the Okhla barrage over Yamuna River. It is situated in Noida, Gautam Buddh Nagar district, on Delhi-Uttar Pradesh state border and known as a haven for over 300 bird species, especially waterbirds. In 1990, an area of 3.5 square kilometres (1.4 sq mi) on the river Yamuna was designated a bird sanctuary by the Government of Uttar Pradesh under the Wildlife Protection Act, 1972. The site is located at the point where the river enters Uttar Pradesh. The most prominent feature of the sanctuary is the large lake created by damming the river, which lies between Okhla village to the west and Gautam Budh Nagar to the east. The Okhla Bird Sanctuary (OBS) is roughly 4 km^{2} (1.5 sq mi) in size and is situated at the entrance of NOIDA in Gautam Budh Nagar district of Uttar Pradesh. It is situated at a point where river Yamuna enters in the state of Uttar Pradesh leaving the territory of Delhi. It is one of the 15 bird sanctuaries in the state.

The bird species of thorny scrub, grassland and wetland are seen in the sanctuary due to its location. This wetland was formed by the creation of Okhla Barrage. The Uttar Pradesh Government designated this a sanctuary in the year 1990. It is now one of the 466 IBAs (Important Bird Areas) in India.

== History ==
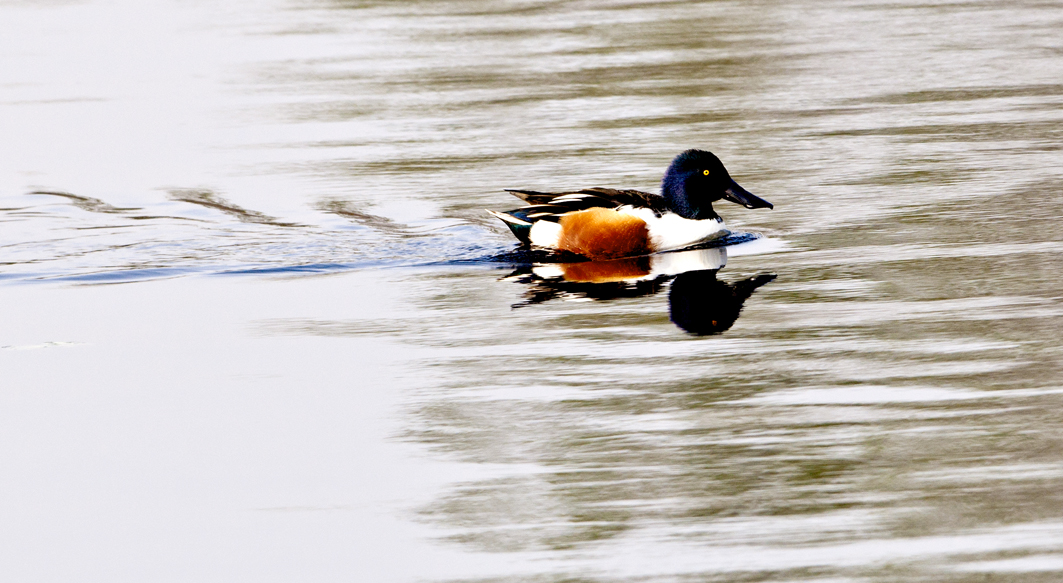
Northern shoveler at Okhla Bird Sanctuary

The areas around Okhla barrage, encompassing the river Yamuna and the marshes associated with it, have been a favorite haunt for birdwatchers, ever since the construction of Agra Canal, which started from here in 1874. Major-General H. P. W. Hutson recorded the birds of Okhla during the course of his ornithological surveys in the Delhi region during June 1943 to May 1945. Subsequently, Mrs Usha Ganguli also recorded the avifauna from this site in her book, A guide to the birds of the Delhi area. Following the construction of a barrage and the resulting lake in 1986, birdwatching activity has increased at this site. Spread over 3.5 square kilometres (1.4 sq mi) on the river Yamuna, the sanctuary is in the Gautam Budh Nagar district of Uttar Pradesh. It was declared a protected area in 1990, under the Wildlife Protection Act, 1972.

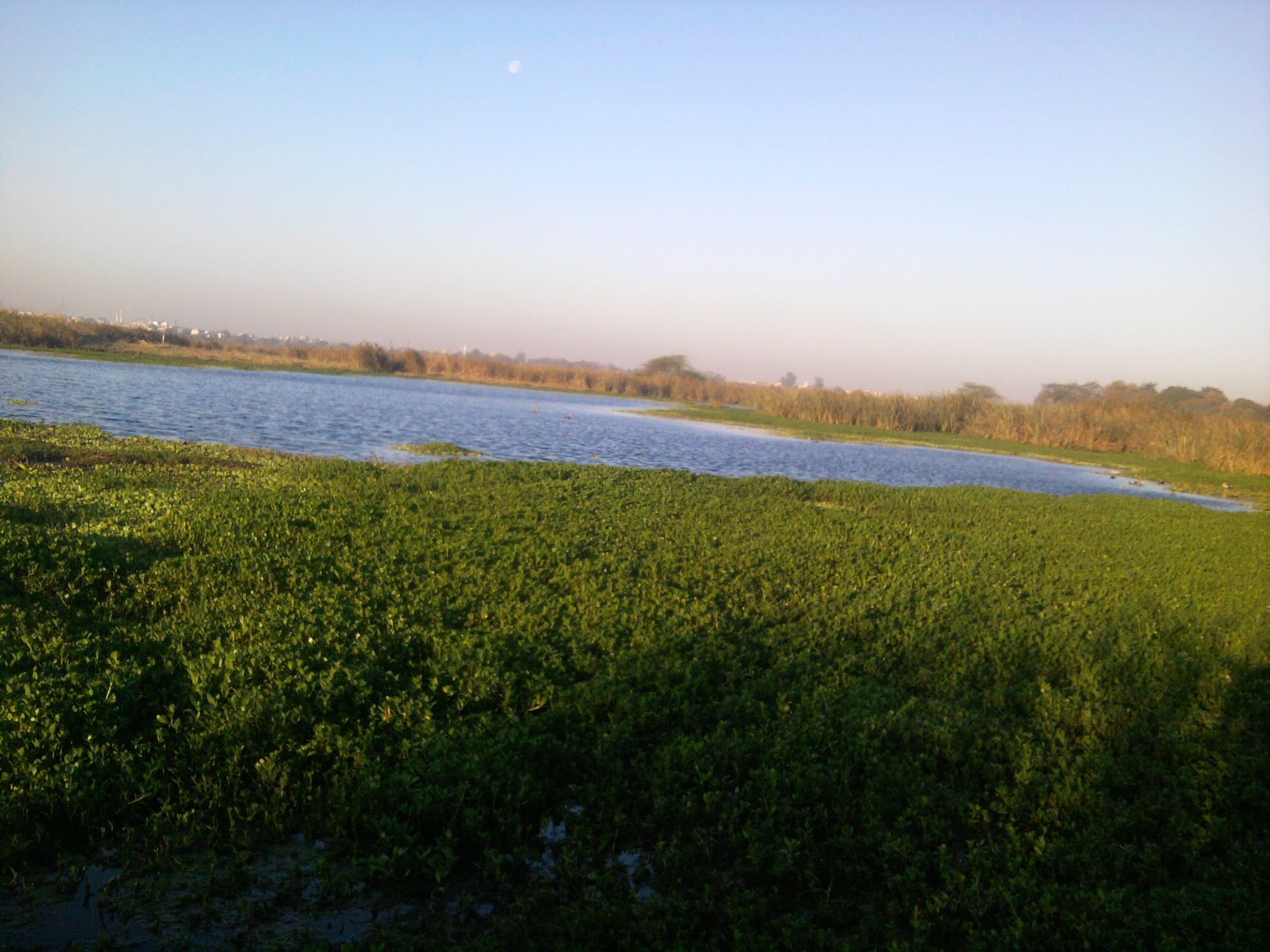
View of Yamuna from Okhla Bird Sanctuary

Over the years, due to increasing pollution in the Yamuna, and shrinking habitat of marshlands and water areas, the bird count has reduced. The habitat of the sanctuary has been under threat due to rapid urban development and construction activities in the surrounding areas. On 14 August 2013, responding to a petition filed by local environmentalist, National Green Tribunal (NGT) ordered the Noida authority to stop unauthorised constructions by private builders within a 10-km radius of the sanctuary. It also asked the authority to conduct fresh land-survey in the area. In October 2013, the tribunal issued an interim directive stating "all the building constructions made within 10 km radius of the Okhla bird sanctuary or within distance of Eco-sensitive zone as may be prescribed by the notification issued by the MoEF shall be subject to the decision of the National Board for Wild Life (NBWL) and till the time the clearance of NBWL is obtained, the authority concerned shall not issue completion certificates to projects." Thereafter, in June 2014, the Supreme Court upheld the order.

== Attractions ==
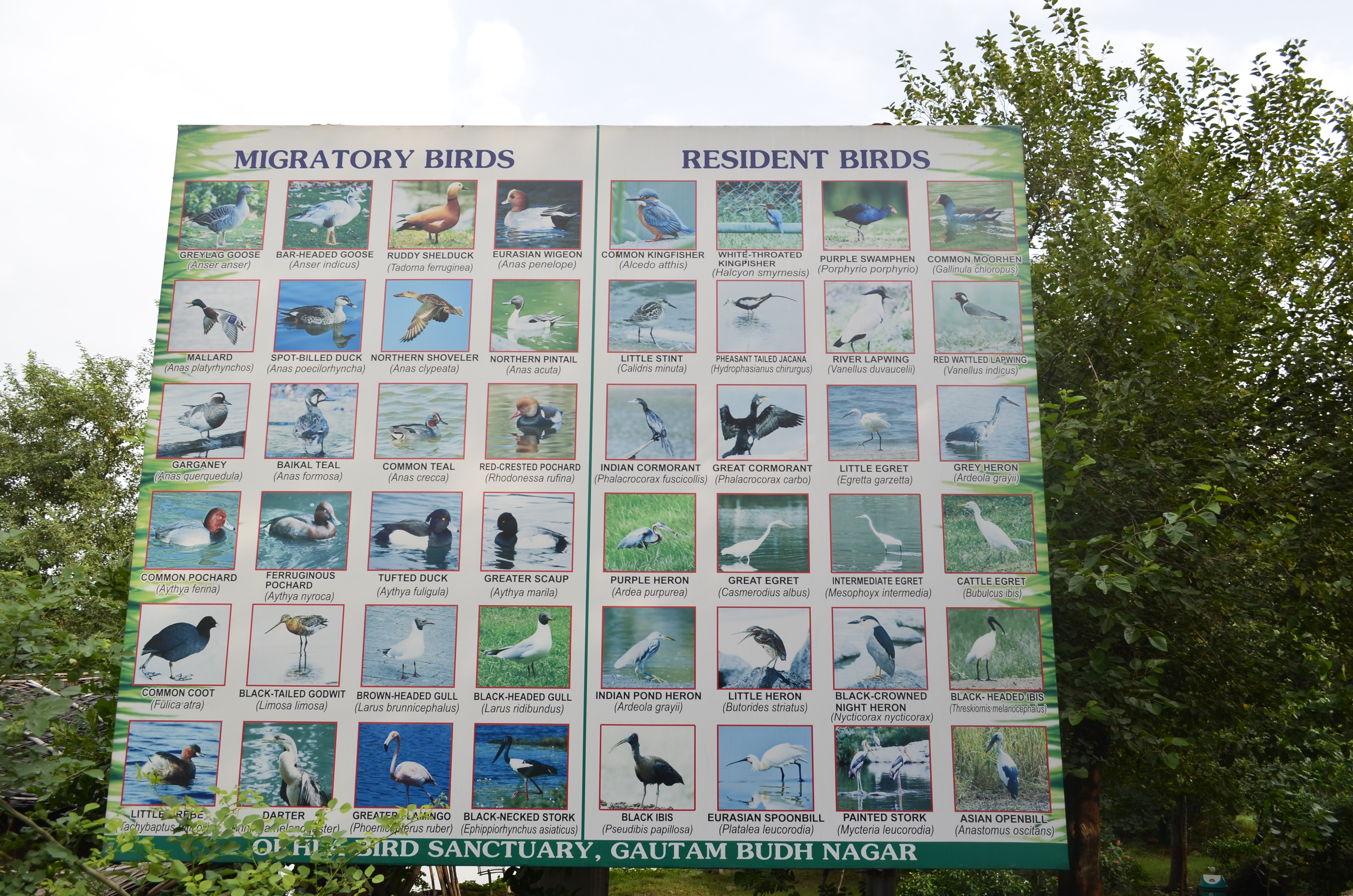
Board showing the birds found in the sanctuary

A total of 302 species have confirmed records from Okhla bird sanctuary and the areas in its immediate vicinity. An additional 27 species have been listed by Harris (2001) as probable, but unconfirmed, occurrence. In January 2011, as a part of Asian Waterbird Census 2011, a leucistic coot, known for its unusual bright white plumage, was spotted with the flock of common coots, for the first time in India. The sanctuary hosts over 400 species year round and over 100,000 migratory birds in winter months. It hosts 30% of the 1200 to 1300 bird species recorded in the Indian sub-continent.

The total Okhla list includes:

- Two critically endangered (CR) species (white-rumped vulture and Indian vulture)
- Nine vulnerable (VU) species (Baikal teal, Baer’s pochard, sarus crane, sociable lapwing, Indian skimmer, Pallas’s fish eagle, lesser adjutant, bristled grassbird and Finn’s weaver)
- Seven near threatened (NT) species (ferruginous pochard, black-bellied tern, grey-headed fish eagle, erratically east to West Bengal and south to Kerala and Sri Lanka.

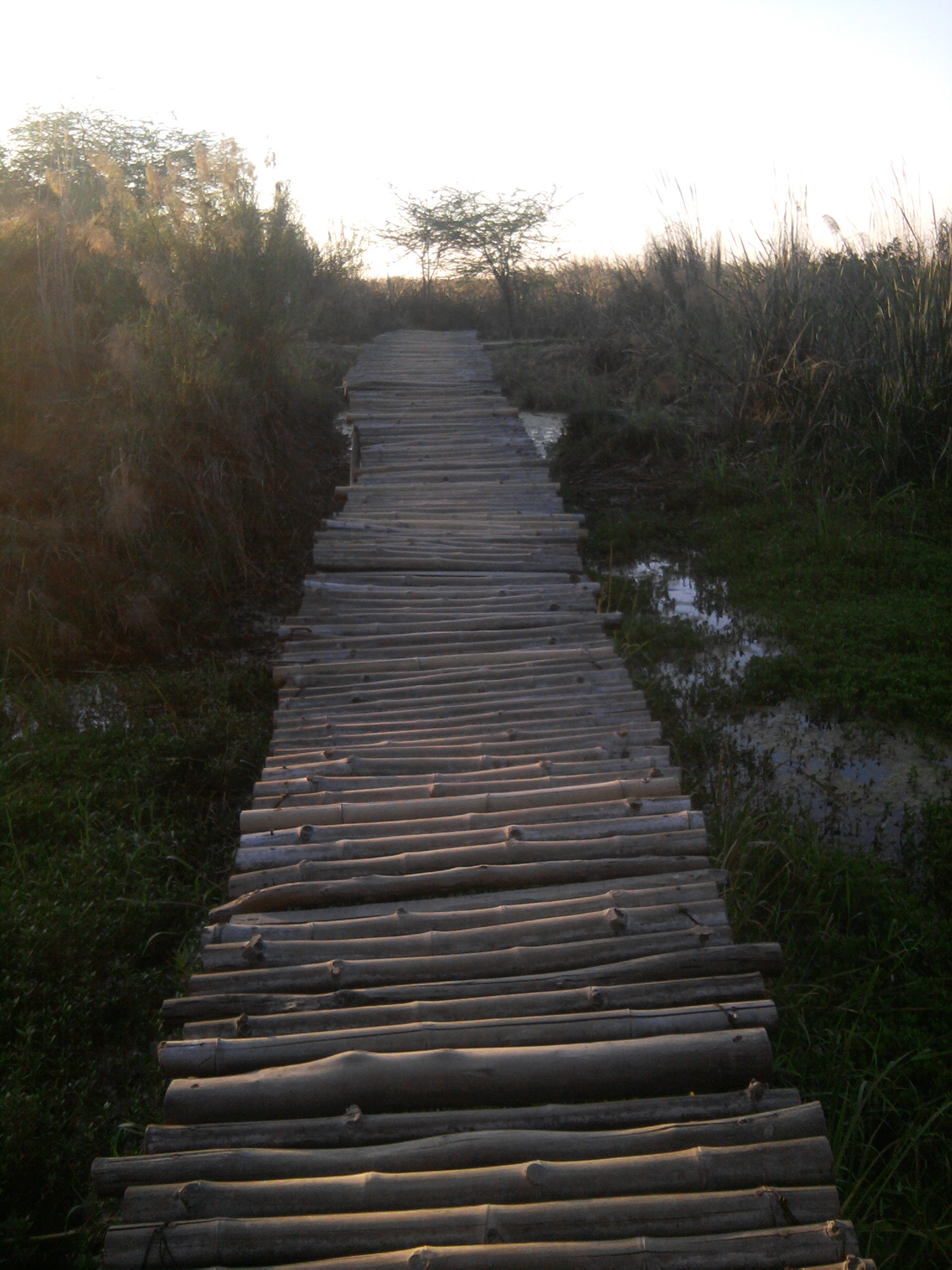
A wooden path for visitors

== Concerns ==
Even though UP government has claimed that it is taking all steps to protect Okhla Bird Sanctuary, the forest is declining, The Okhla bird sanctuary is seeing a record low turnout with every coming year. Once a thriving habitat for flamingos and sarus and pochards, the Okhla Bird Sanctuary today is devoid of most of its winged visitors. Even the number of small terrestrial birds like stonechats, warblers and paradise flycatchers has declined.

Urban developments, including commercial complexes, the DND Flyway, flyovers, and Ambedkar Park, have reduced foraging areas near the Okhla Bird Sanctuary, while high-voltage 400 kV transmission lines act as a deterrent to avian activity. Despite these threats, a Baikal teal (Sibirionetta formosa) was sighted at the sanctuary after 40 years. While historical records indicate higher bird populations, local counts have declined in recent years.

The WII had observed that the ESZ should cover the entire flood plain from Wazirabad barrage to Jaitpur in Delhi to Asgharpur in Uttar Pradesh. "Hence the area west to Geeta Colony Road, Noida Link Road in the east to the river and area east to G.T. Road-National Highway 1 up to Jaitpur in the west to river can be included as ESZ", the report said. But the environment ministry has reportedly agreed to the Uttar Pradesh government's proposal of notifying only 100 metres as ESZ. The Haryana government has claimed that none of its territory falls within 5,000 metres of the sanctuary and is thus outside the ESZ.

According to the report, emphasis should be given to protecting flood plains to the north and south of the sanctuary by increasing the width of the ESZ. The northern boundary of the zone was to be extended to Wazirabad Barrage as the sanctuary is a riverine area and any development activity upstream would affect its integrity. "The southern boundary of the ESZ should be extended to at least 5,000 metres down to Asgarpur Jagir (UP)-Jaitpur (Delhi), covering both sides of the river. A diagrammatic land use in this area (flood plains) needs to be maintained unaltered to avoid further increase in pressure on the sanctuary. A buffer of vegetation needs to be maintained at both the edge of the eastern and western boundary of the sanctuary", the WII recommended.

== Transport ==
The sanctuary is approachable from Mathura Road (NH-2), via Sarita Vihar going towards Noida. The nearest stations of Delhi Metro is Okhla Bird Sanctuary metro station on Magenta Line .

== See also ==
- Arid Forest Research Institute (AFRI)
- Najafgarh drain bird sanctuary, Delhi
- National Zoological Park Delhi
- Asola Bhatti Wildlife Sanctuary, Delhi
- Sultanpur National Park, bordering Delhi in adjoining Gurgaon District, Haryana
- Bhalswa horseshoe lake, Northwest Delhi
