= Kalindi Kunj =

Park in Delhi, India

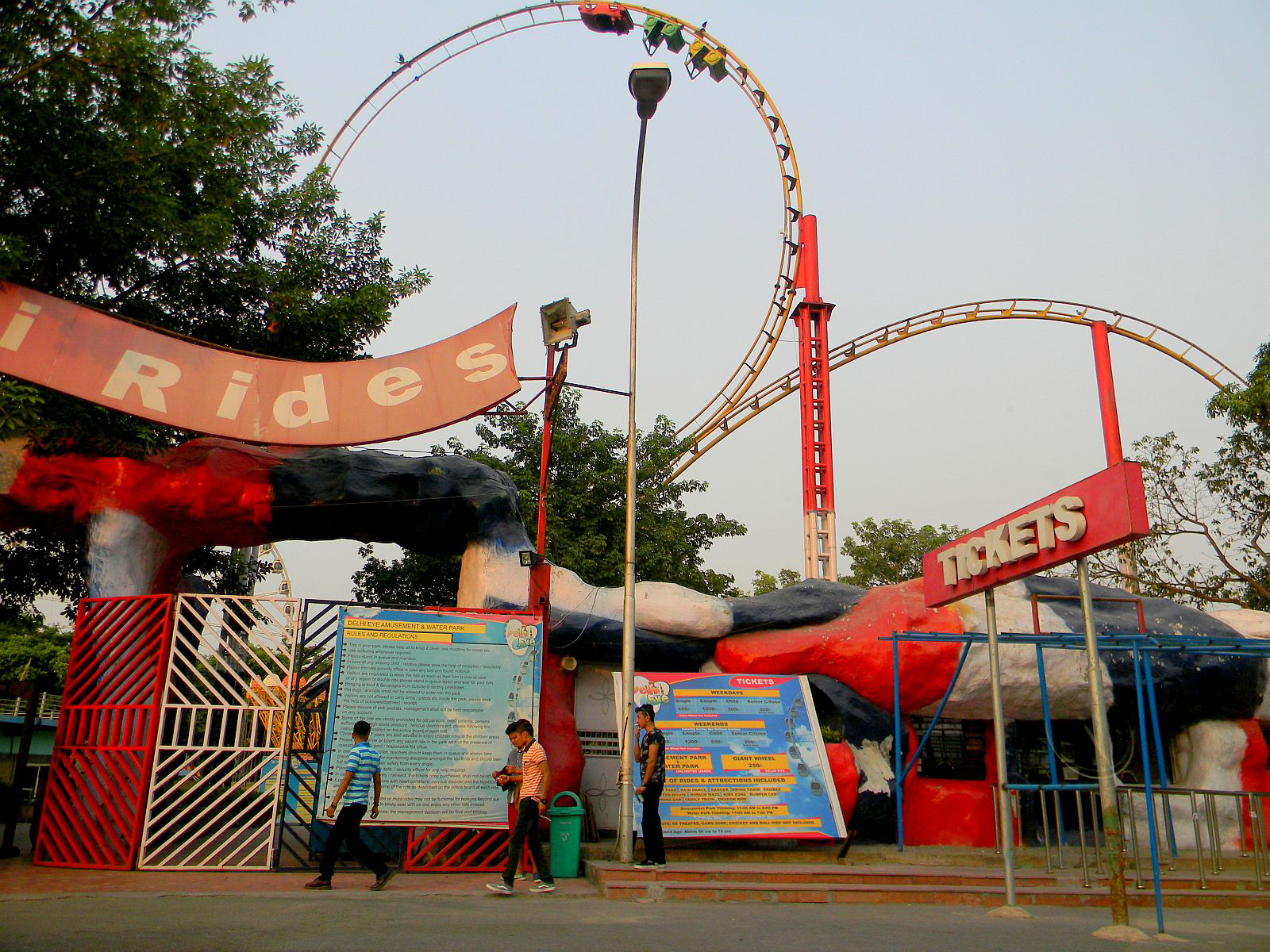
- Atlantic Water World – main gate
- Interactive map of Kalindi Kunj
- Location: Delhi
- Coordinates: 28°32′45″N 77°18′31″E

Kalindi Kunj is a public garden and a famous T point road in Delhi, located on the banks of River Yamuna, close to Okhla barrage.

Atlantic Water World, an amusement park incorporating a water park, is located there.

== See also ==
- List of parks in Delhi
