= Indori River =

Coordinates: 28°29′N 76°44′E

- Native name: इन्दोरी नदी (Hindi)

Location
- Country: India

Physical characteristics
- Source
  - location: Aravalli Range, From Alwar district and Sikar district of Rajasthan to Rewari district of Haryana
- Mouth
  - location: Rewari
- Discharge
  - location: Sahibi River in Haryana

The Indori river (Hindi: इन्दोरी नदी), is a rain-fed river originates from Aravalli Range from Sikar district and flows through Alwar district of Rajasthan to Rewari district of Haryana and it is the longest tributary of Sahibi River which stretches to 50 km. In Delhi, it is called the Najafgarh drain or Najafgarh Nallah.

== Archaeological findings ==
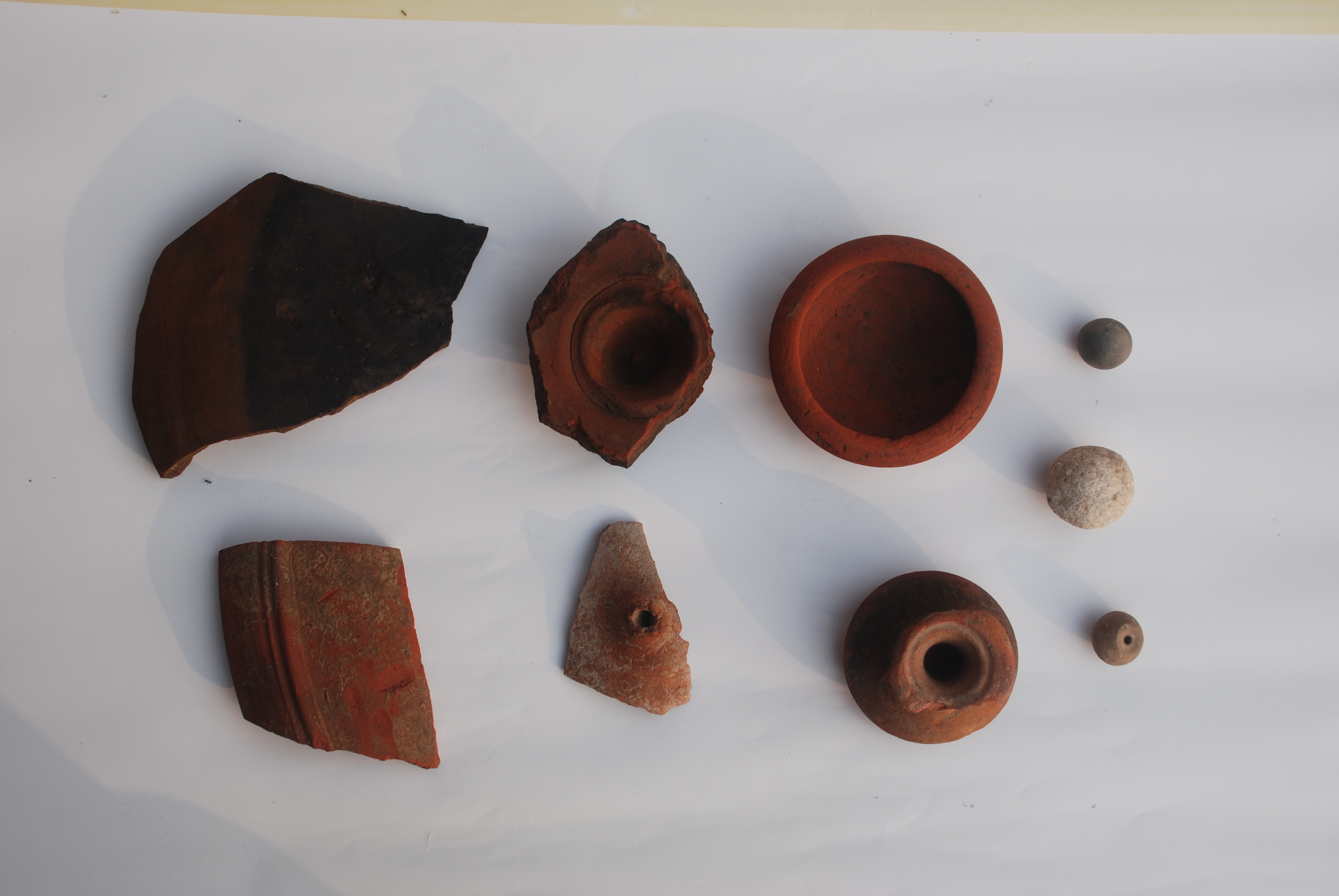
Earthenware (Pottery) found on the Sahibi riverbed by INTACH-Rewari, at Hansaka village, Rewari District, 2012

Archaeological findings on the Sahibi River have confirmed habitations on its banks before the Harappan and pre-Mahabharata periods. Both handmade and wheel-made earthenware dated from 3309–2709 BCE and 2879–2384 BCE has been found on the banks of the Sahibi River at Jodhpura. INTACH-Rewari found pottery on the Sahibi riverbed at Hansaka in the Rewari district. A red stone statue of Vamana Dev was found in the Sahibi riverbed near Bawal in 2002; the statue is now displayed at the Shri Krishna Museum, Kurukshetra. Other artifacts discovered in the Sahibi River include arrowheads, fishhooks, appearheads, awls, and chisels.

== Identification with Vedic rivers ==
Several modern scholars identify the old Ghaggar-Hakra River (of which Tangri river is a tributary) as the Sarasvati River and the Sahibi River with the Drishadvati River of Vedic period, on the banks of which Indus–Sarasvati Civilisation developed. such scholars include Bhargava The Drishadwati River formed one border of the Vedic state of Brahmavarta and was mentioned in the Rigveda, the Manusmriti, and the Brahmin Granths texts.

== Gallery ==
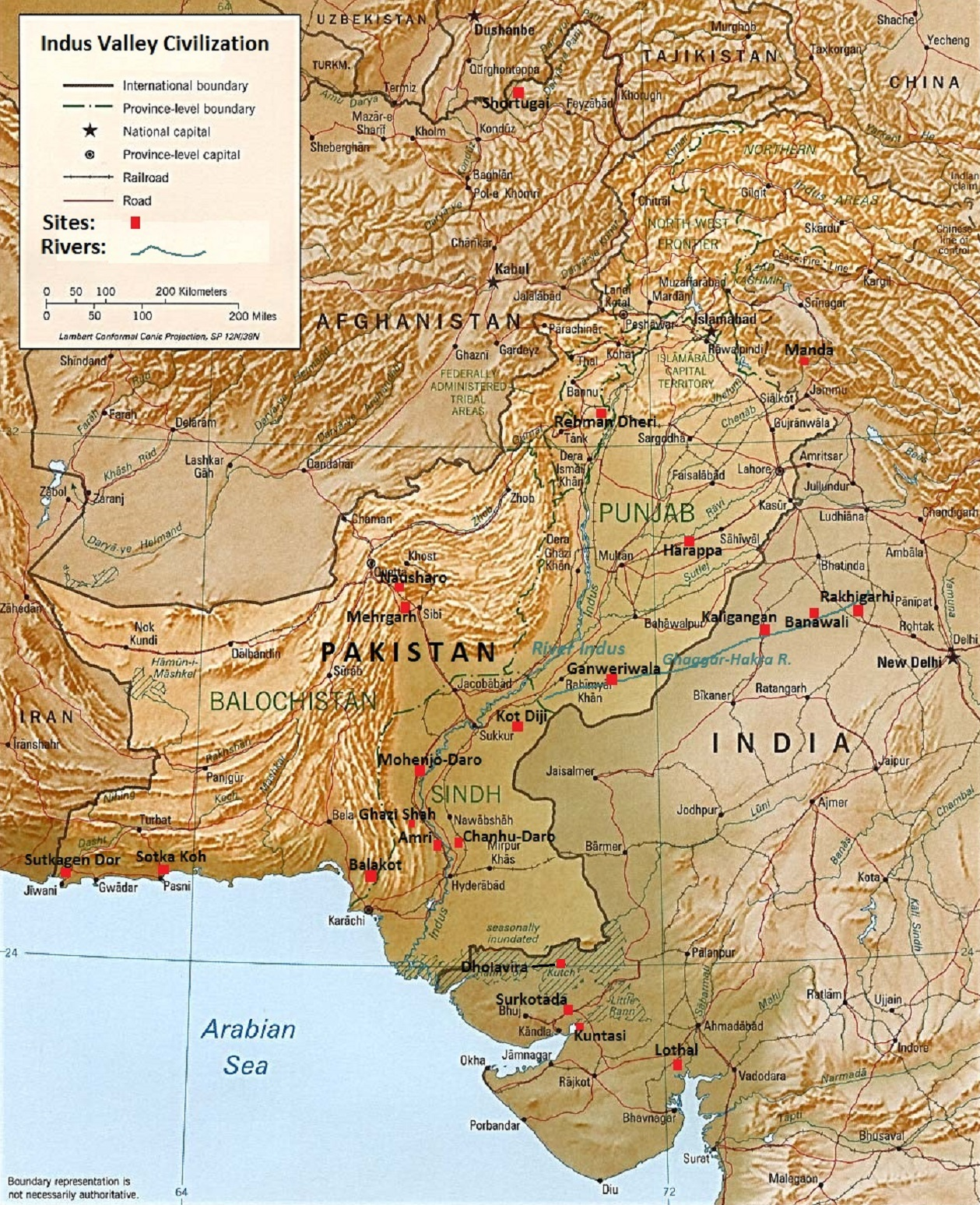
Indus–Sarasvati Civilisation major sites

== See also ==
- Krishnavati river
- Dangri, a tributary of Sarsuti
- Tangri river, a tributary of Sarsuti, merge if Dangri and Tangri are same
- Sarsuti, a tributary of Ghaggar-Hakra River
- Kaushalya river, a tributary of Ghaggar-Hakra River
- Chautang, a tributary of Ghaggar-Hakra River
- Sutlej, a tributary of Indus
- Ganges
- Indus
- Western Yamuna Canal, branches off Yamuna
- List of rivers of Rajasthan
- List of rivers of India
- List of dams and reservoirs in India
