= Krishnavati River =

Coordinates: 28°29′N 76°44′E

Krishnavati River Kasaunti river

Location
- Country: India

Physical characteristics
- Source
  - location: Aravalli Range, From Alwar district and Sikar district of Rajasthan to Rewari district of Haryana
- Mouth
  - location: Delhi
- Length: 30 km (19 mi)
- Discharge
  - location: Sahibi River in Haryana

Basin features
- Waterbodies: Norana Check Dam

The Krishnavati River, also called Kasaunti or Kasawati, is a rain-fed river originates from Aravalli Range near Dariba copper mines in Rajsamand district of Rajasthan, and flows through Patan in Dausa district and Mothooka in Alwar district and then disappears in Mahendragarh district in Haryana where it used to be a tributary of Sahibi River, which in turn still is a tributary of Yamuna. Several Ochre Coloured Pottery culture sites (also identified as late Harappan phase of Indus Valley Civilisation culture) have been found along the banks of Krishnavati, Sahibi River, Dohan River (another tributary of Sahibi River originates near Neem Ka Thana in Alwar district) and Sota River (another tributaries of Sahibi river that merges with Sahibi at Behror in Alwar district). The drainage pattern for all these rivers is dendritic.

== Basin ==
The western slopes of Aravalli Range in Rajasthan and southern Haryana forms the basin of this river. The drainage pattern is dendritic.

== Tributaries ==
These west to north-west flowing rivers originate from the western slopes of Aravalli Range in Rajasthan, flow through semi-arid historical Shekhawati region, drain into southern Haryana.

- Sahibi River, originates near Manoharpur in Sikar district flows through Haryana, along with its following tributaries:
  - Dohan River, tributary of Sahibi River, originates near Neem Ka Thana in Alwar district).
  - Sota River, tributary of Sahibi River, merges with Sahibi River at Behror in Alwar district.
  - Krishnavati River, former tributary of Sahibi River, originates near Dariba copper mines in Rajsamand district of Rajasthan, flows through Patan in Dausa district and Mothooka in Alwar district, then disappears in Mahendragarh district in Haryana much before reaching Sahibi river.

== Archaeological findings ==
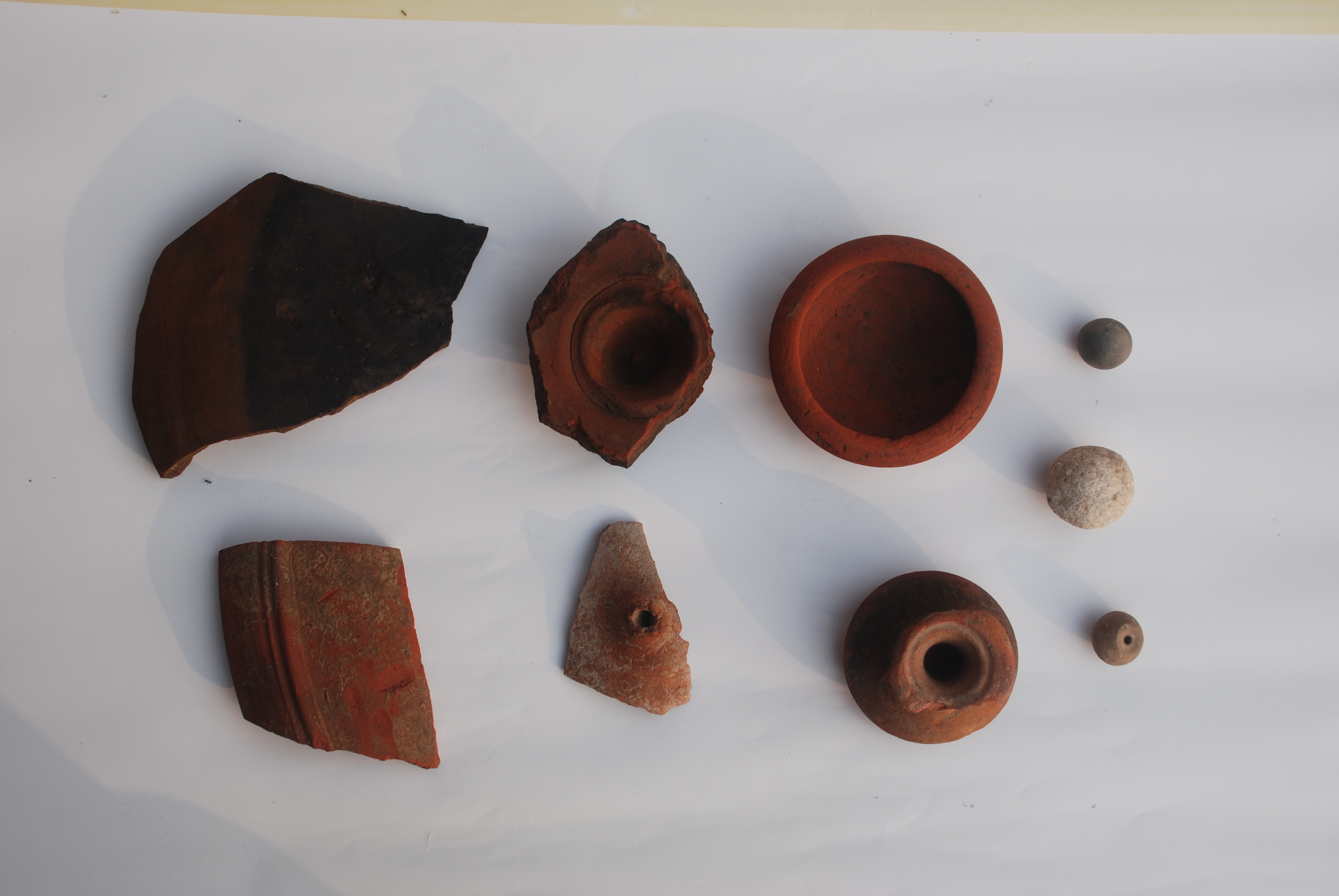
Earthenware (Pottery) found on the Sahibi riverbed by INTACH-Rewari, at Hansaka village, Rewari District, 2012

Archaeological findings on the Sahibi River have confirmed habitations on its banks before the Harappan and pre-Mahabharata periods. Both handmade and wheel-made earthenware dated from 3309–2709 BCE and 2879–2384 BCE has been found on the banks of the Sahibi River at Jodhpura. INTACH-Rewari found pottery on the Sahibi riverbed at Hansaka in the Rewari district. A red stone statue of Vamana Dev was found in the Sahibi riverbed near Bawal in 2002; the statue is now displayed at the Shri Krishna Museum, Kurukshetra. Other artifacts discovered in the Sahibi River include arrowheads, fishhooks, appearheads, awls, and chisels.

== Identification with Vedic rivers ==
Several modern scholars identify the old Ghaggar-Hakra River (of which Tangri River is a tributary) as the Sarasvati River and the Sahibi River with the Drishadvati River of Vedic period, on the banks of which Indus–Sarasvati civilisation developed. such scholars include Bhargava The Drishadwati River formed one border of the Vedic state of Brahmavarta and was mentioned in the Rigveda, the Manusmriti, and the Brahmin Granths texts.

== Gallery ==
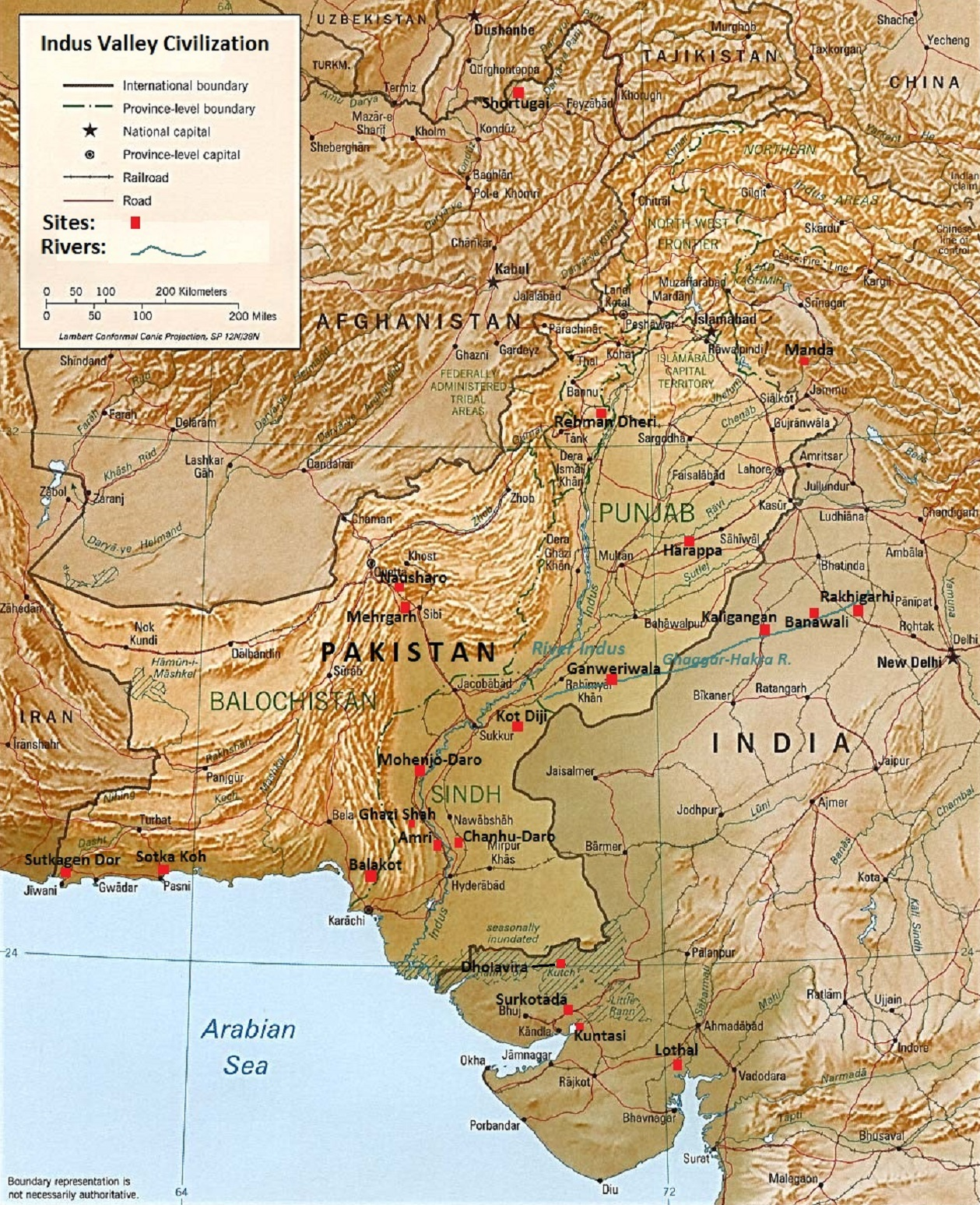
Indus–Sarasvati Civilisation major sites

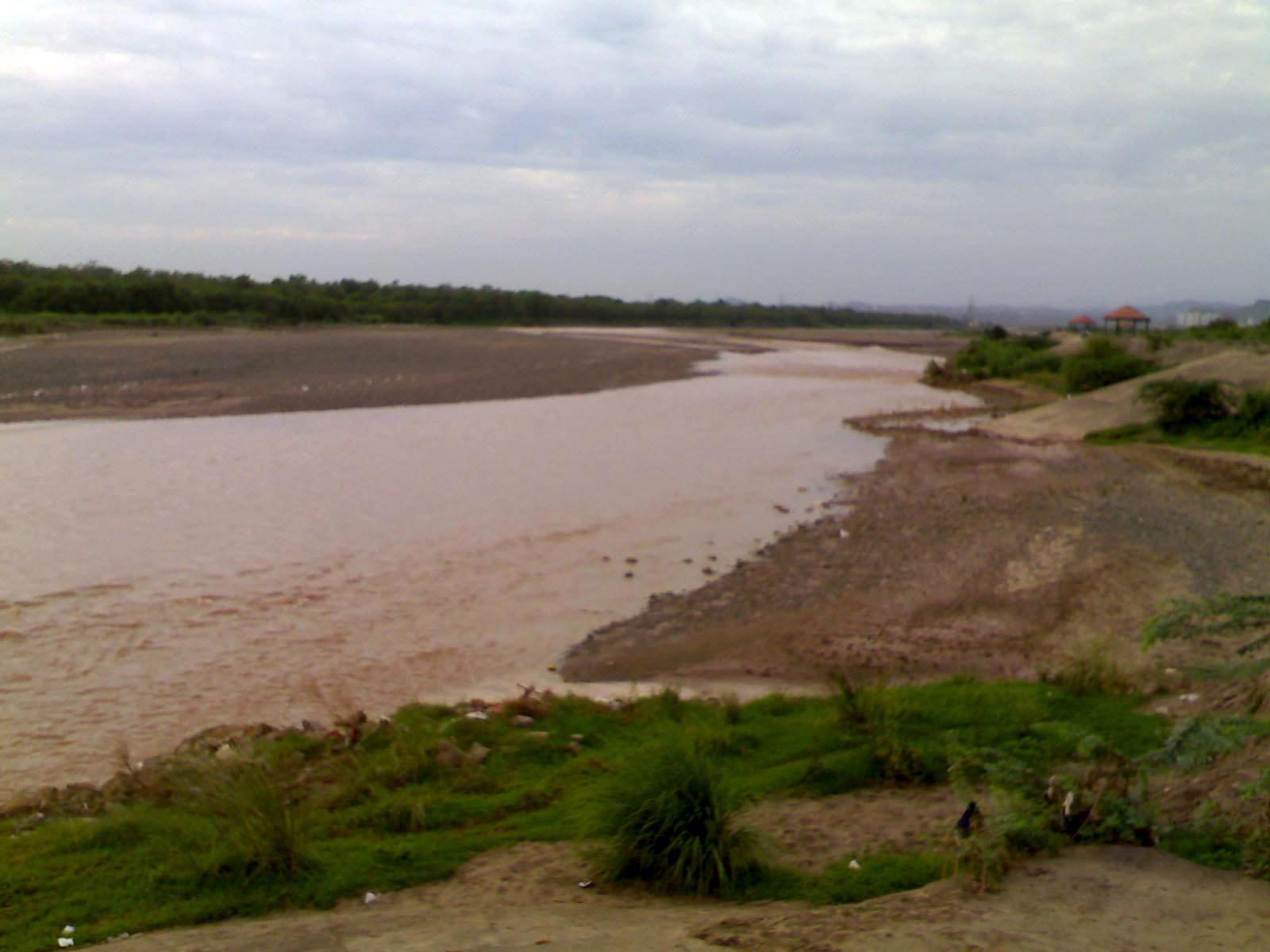
Ghaggar River flowing through Panchkula in Haryana

== See also ==
- Krishnavati River
- Dangri, a tributary of Sarsuti
- Tangri River, a tributary of Sarsuti, merge if Dangri and Tangri are same
- Sarsuti, a tributary of Ghaggar-Hakra River
- Kaushalya River, a tributary of Ghaggar-Hakra River
- Chautang, a tributary of Ghaggar-Hakra River
- Sutlej, a tributary of Indus
- Ganges
- Indus
- Western Yamuna Canal, branches off Yamuna
- List of rivers of Rajasthan
- List of rivers of India
- List of dams and reservoirs in India
