= Sahibi River =

River in India

Coordinates: 28°29′N 76°44′E

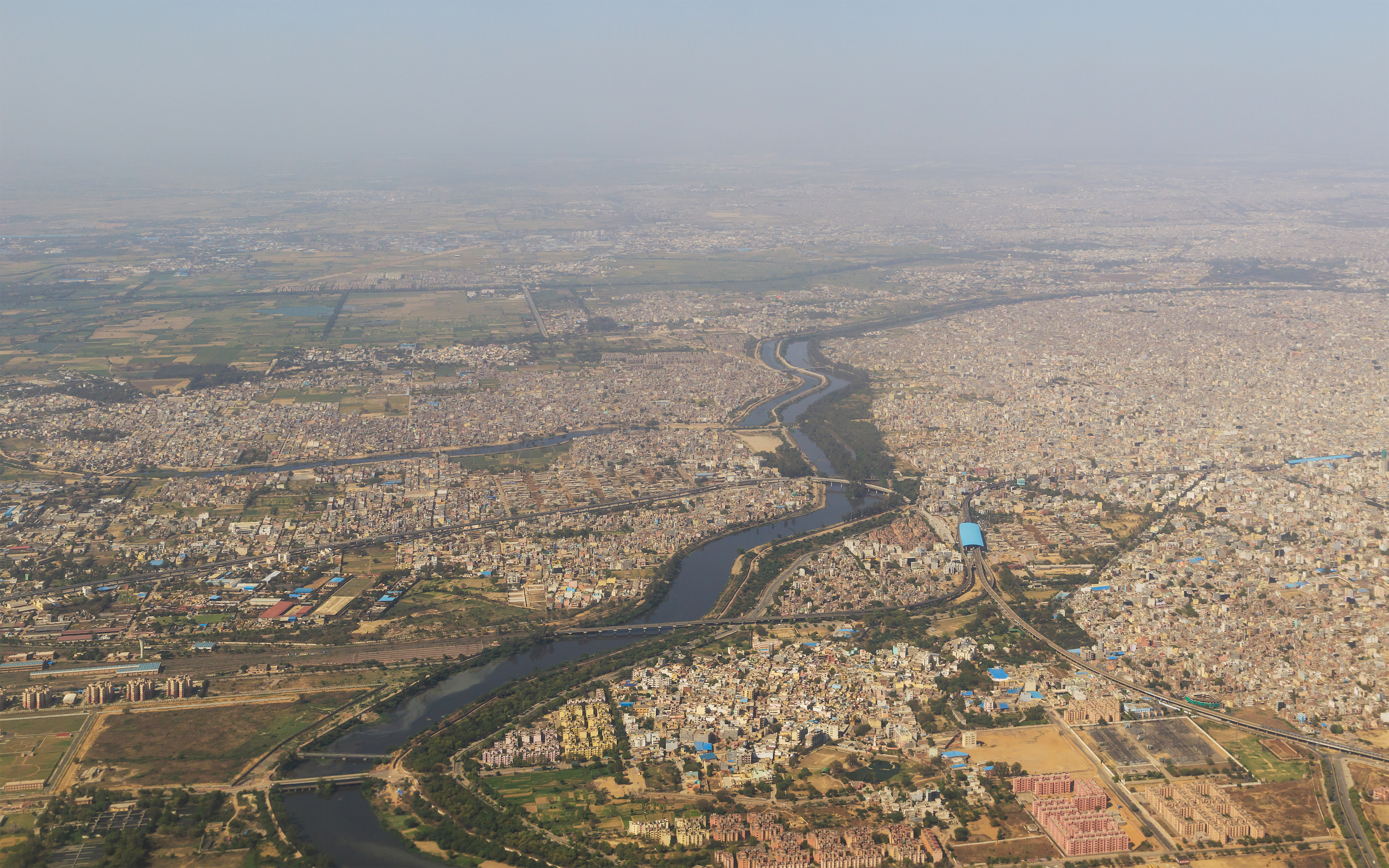

Location
- Country: India

Physical characteristics
- Source
  - location: Aravalli Range, from Jitgarh, Manoharpur, and Saiwar Protected Forest (PF) hills in Sikar District
- Mouth
  - location: Delhi
- Length: 300 km (190 mi)
- Discharge
  - location: Yamuna in Delhi

Basin features
- Tributaries
  - left: Narayanpur Nala, Surakh Nali, Hajipur Nala, Kasoti Nala, Khar Nali
  - right: Sota river, Kotkasim drain, Krishnavati river and Indori river (Indori Nallah), Dohan River
- Waterbodies: Masani barrage, Najafgarh Lake
- Bridges: Masani Bridge on NH-48, Sodawas Bridge on SH-14, Bridge onSH-52, Ajarka Bridge on Rewari-Alwar Railway Line, Pataudi Bridge on Rewari-Delhi Railway Line, Railway Bridge Nangal Pathani

The Sahibi River, also called the Sabi River, is an ephemeral, rain-fed river flowing through Rajasthan, Haryana (where its canalised portion is called the "Outfall Drain No 8") and Delhi states in India. It originates in the eastern slopes of the Saiwar Protected Forest (PF) hills in Sikar District, enters Jaipur district near the foot of these hills, and after initially flowing southeast and east turns northeastwards near Shahpura and continues further till it exits Rajasthan to enter Haryana and further drains into Yamuna in Delhi, where its channeled course is also called the Najafgarh drain, which also serves as Najafgarh drain bird sanctuary. It flows for 300 km of which 157 km is in Rajasthan 100 km is in Haryana and 40 km in Delhi.

The current and paleochannels of the Sahibi River have several important wetlands that lie in series, including the Masani barrage wetland, Matanhail forest, Chhuchhakwas-Godhari, Khaparwas Wildlife Sanctuary, Bhindawas Wildlife Sanctuary, Outfall Drain Number 6 (canalised portion in Haryana of Sahibii river), Outfall Drain Number 8 (canalised portion in Haryana of Dohan river which is a tributary of the Sahibi), Sarbashirpur, Sultanpur National Park, Basai Wetland, Najafgarh lake and Najafgarh drain bird sanctuary, and The Lost lake of Gurugram, all of which are home to endangered and migratory birds, yet largely remain unprotected under extreme threat from the colonisers and builders.

Several Ochre Coloured Pottery culture sites (also identified as late Harappan phase of Indus Valley Civilisation culture) have been found along the banks of the Sahibi and its tributaries such as Krishnavati River, Dohan River (originates near Neem Ka Thana in Sikar district) and Sota River (merges with the Sahibi River at Behror in Kotputli-Behror district and its canalised portion in Haryana is called the "Outfall Drain No 6"). The drainage pattern for all these rivers is dendritic.

== Geography ==
The Sahibi River originates from the eastern slopes of the Saiwar Protected Forest hills in Aravalli Range near Jitgarh and Manoharpur in Sikar district of Rajasthan state. After covering about 157 km distance in the Rajasthan state. After gathering volume from a hundred tributaries, the Sahibi River forms a broad stream around Alwar and Kotputli.

=== Tributaries ===
These west to north-west flowing rivers originate from the western slopes of Aravalli Range in Rajasthan, flow through semi-arid historical Shekhawati region, and drain into southern Haryana.

- Sahibi River originates near Manoharpur and Neem Ka Thana district, and flows through Haryana, along with its following tributaries:
  - Dohan river (Kotkasim drain), tributary of the Sahibi River, originates near Neem Ka Thana in Sikar division.
  - Sota River is a major tributary of the Sahibi River, merges with the Sahibi at Behror in Kot Behror district.
  - Krishnavati river, former tributary of the Sahibi River, originates near Dariba copper mines in Rajsamand district of Rajasthan, flows through Patan in Dausa district and Mothooka in Alwar district, then disappears in Mahendragarh district in Haryana much before reaching Sahibi River.
  - Narainpur Nala carries the drainage of north-west of Bansur Tehsil and drains into the Sahibi.
  - Surakh Nali from babariya bund in Bansur drains into the Sahibi at Sodawas
  - Khar Nali drains at Sodawas.
  - Kasaoti Nala in Behror drains into Sahibi River.
  - Hajipur or Harsora Nala from Bansur drains into the Sahibi at Bijwar in Mundawar tehsil.
  - Indori river is also a tributary of Sahibi River.

=== Basin and catchment area ===
Sabi River Basin is located in the mid north eastern part of Rajasthan. It stretches between 27° 18' 39.13” to 28° 13' 55.10” North latitude and 76° 58' 21.09’’ to 75° 45' 35.05’’ East longitude. It is bounded in the northwest by Shekhawati River Basin and Ruparail and Banganga River Basins in the southeast. The northern boundary is shared administratively with Haryana State. The Basin extends over parts of Jaipur Rural and Neem Ka Thana, Kot Behror, Khairthal, Rewari, Jhajjar, Gurugram districts. The total catchment area of the Basin is 4607.9 km2.

The catchment area of the Sahibi River encompasses the following cities and towns: Sikar, Jaipur, and Kotputli in northeastern Rajasthan state; Rewari district, Gurgaon district and Jhajjar district in southern Haryana state; and Delhi state.

==== Rajasthan ====
The catchment area of the Sahibi River in Rajasthan is 4,523.67 square kilometres (1,746.60 mi^{2}) of Jaipur, Alwar and Sikar districts, between latitudes 27°16' and 28°11' and longitudes 75°42' and 76°57'. The Sahibi Basin falls in three districts of Rajasthan: Alwar district (62.11%), Jaipur district (29.30%) and Sikar district (8.59%).

The mean annual rainfall in Sahibi Basin is 627.60 mm. Highest maximum temperature ranges from 45.45 to 45.99 °C with a mean value of 45.8 °C, while Lowest minimum temperature ranges from 1.64 to 3.14 °C with a mean value of 2.45 °C.

==== Haryana ====
The river leaves Rajasthan state beyond Kotkasim in Alwar district near village Lalpur and covers a total distance of about 222 km up to Dhasa Bund.

It enters Haryana state at Jhabua, near the city of Rewari in Rewari district, after which it re-enters first Rajasthan state near Kotkasim, and then Haryana again near the village of Jarthal. The dry riverbed near Jarthal is 2 kilometres (1.2 mi) wide. During light monsoon rainfall, the river's flat and sandy bottom absorbs all rainwater. Masani barrage on the river lies near Dahuhera. During heavy rains, the river has a defined course up to Pataudi railway station and branches off into two smaller streams to Jhajjar, finally reaching the outskirts of Delhi through Najafgarh drain and ending at the Yamuna River.

==== Delhi ====
The Najafgarh Drain or Najafgarh Nallah (nullah in Hindi means drain) is another name for the Sahibi River, which continues its flow through Delhi where it is channelised for flood control purposes. It is a tributary to the Yamuna River, into which it flows. The Najafgarh Drain gets its name from the once famous and huge Najafgarh Lake near the town of Najafgarh in southwest Delhi. The Najafgarh Drain is the capital's most polluted body of water due to the direct inflow of untreated sewage from surrounding populated areas. Assessing the water quality of wetlands in wildlife habitats, a January 2005 report by the Central Pollution Control Board rated the Najafgarh Drain under category D, along with 13 other highly polluted wetlands.

Regulators at the Keshopur Bus Depot on the Outer Ring Road are wide with thick and high embankments. A vast amount of water is retained in this widened drain by closing the Kakrola regulators under Najafgarh Road to recharge the local groundwater table.

In January 2026, the Irrigation and Flood Control Department deployed a Finnish-made Watermaster amphibious dredger and three self-propelled hopper barges to desilt the drain, which is estimated to contribute nearly 70% of the pollution load entering the Yamuna, as part of a technology-driven, long-term effort to improve water flow, enhance flood resilience, and to reduce pollution before it reaches the river.

=== Barrages and bridges ===
Several bridges cross the Sahibi River. A bridge on State Highway 14 crosses the river between Behror and Sodawas (Behror to Alwar Road). On State Highway 52, a bridge crosses the river between Ajaraka and Dadhiya. The Masani barrage is also used as the bridge on NH 919 which merges with NH 48 (Delhi-Jaipur-Mumbai, formerly NH 8) at this barrage near Dharuhera, Rewari. Buchara dam is located in Buchara Leopard Sanctuary Kotputli on Sota River, a major tributary. Railway bridges between Ajaraka and Bawal and near Pataudi also cross the river. A railway bridge near Nangal Pathani also crosses the river.

== History ==
Prior to 1960, the rain-fed Sahibi River entered Delhi near Dhansa and spilled its overflow in the Najafgarh Lake (Jheel) basin, creating a seasonal lake. A vast area of more than 300 square kilometres (120 mi^{2}) was submerged in some seasons. In the following decades, the Sahibi River flow reaching Dhansa was channelised by digging a wide drain and connecting it directly to the Yamuna River, completely draining the seasonal Najafgarh Jheel.

The Sahibi River flooded in 1977. In response, the Masani barrage was constructed on Delhi-Jaipur highway near Masani village, Rewari. Several smaller dams have also been constructed throughout the hills of Rajasthan to store rainwater. The construction of dams has restricted the flow of water on the Sahibi River and it is now rare for water overflow from monsoon rains to reach up the Masani Barrage.

=== Archaeological sites in the area ===
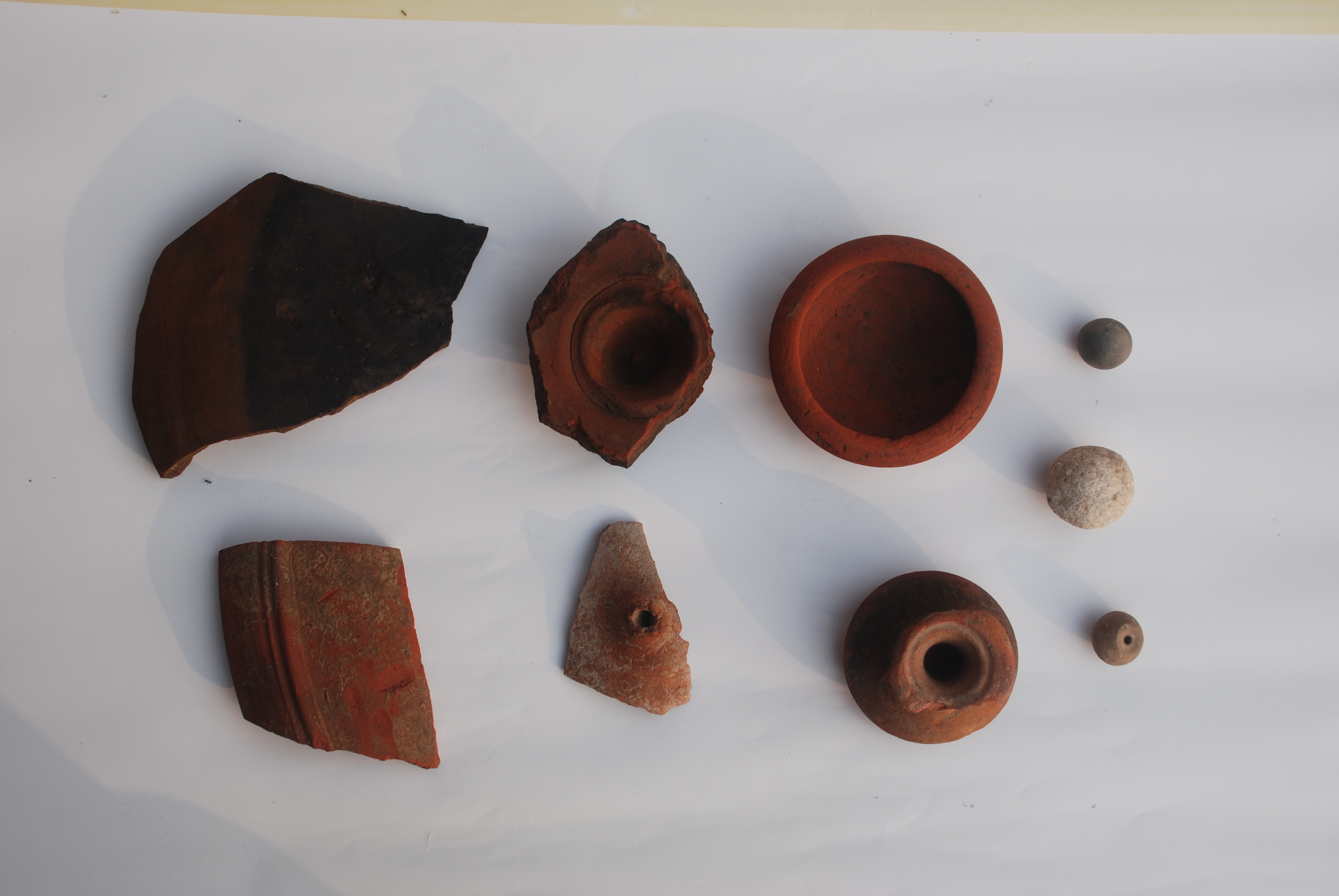
Earthenware (pottery) found on the Sahibi riverbed by INTACH-Rewari, at Hansaka village, Rewari District, 2012

Parts of Rajasthan and Haryana that Sahibi river flows through are arid and have only seasonal monsoon rainfall, in the past river might have held perennial flow as evident by the presence of several sites of the Ganeshwar–Jodhpura culture on the banks of present-day Sahibi River meanders and its tributaries. Among the finds are handmade and wheel-made pottery dated to 3309–2709 BCE and 2879–2384 BCE found on the banks of the Sahibi River at Jodhpura.

Other findings include pottery found on the Sahibi riverbed at Hansaka in the Rewari district by INTACH-Rewari.

A red stone statue of Vamana Dev, now displayed at the Shri Krishna Museum, Kurukshetra was unearthed in 2002 on the Sahibi riverbed near Bawal.

In various other places on Sahibi riverbed, many artifacts have been found, including arrowheads, fishhooks, spearheads, awls, and chisels.

=== Identification with Vedic rivers ===
Several modern scholars identify the old Ghaggar-Hakra River (of which Tangri river is a tributary) as the Sarasvati River and the Sahibi River with the Drishadvati river of Vedic period, on the banks of which in the Vedic state of Brahmavarta, Indus-Sarasvati civilisation or Vedic Sanskriti developed. Such scholars include Bhargava The Drishadwati River had formed one border of the Vedic state of Brahmavarta while other was Saraswati river. This is mentioned in the Rigveda, the Manusmriti, and the other Hindu texts as well.

== Ecology ==
This is an important part of the ecological corridor along the route of Sahibi River which traverses from Aravalli hills in Rajasthan to Yamuna via Masani barrage, Matanhail forest, Chhuchhakwas-Godhari, Khaparwas Wildlife Sanctuary, Bhindawas Wildlife Sanctuary, Outfall Drain Number 8 and 6, Sarbashirpur, Sultanpur National Park, Basai and The Lost Lake (Gurugram). It lies 5 km northwest of Bhindawas Bird Sanctuary and 46 km northwest of Sultantpur National Park via road.

=== Ecological concerns ===
The entire 100 km stretch of Sahibi River and its streams (Sota river, Kotkasim drain and Indori river) in Haryana are ecologically dead. Gurugram also dumps polluted discharge in the riverbed of Sahibi. In some of its reaches, from Mandawar and Kotkasim to Haryana border, meandering of the river causes bank erosion.

=== Restoration ===
Government of Haryana is coordinating with Government of Rajasthan to ensure water reaches usually-dry Masani barrage and dying seasonal Sahibi River. Another government project is being implemented to direct the extra water of Yamuna river during monsoon to Masani barrage through Jawahar Lal Nehru Canal and Western Yamuna Canal (c. July 2015).

== See also ==
- Saraswati river
- Dangri, a tributary of Sarsuti
- Tangri river, a tributary of Sarsuti, merge if Dangri and Tangri are same
- Sarsuti, a tributary of Ghaggar-Hakra River
- Kaushalya river, a tributary of Ghaggar-Hakra River
- Chautang, a tributary of Ghaggar-Hakra River
- Sutlej, a tributary of Indus
- Ganges
- Indus
- Western Yamuna Canal, branches off Yamuna
- List of rivers of Rajasthan
- List of rivers of India
- List of dams and reservoirs in India
- List of most-polluted rivers
