= Dohan River =

Coordinates: 28°29′N 76°44′E

Dohan / Duhan River Vadhūsarā River
- Interactive Map

Location
- Country: India

Physical characteristics
- Source
  - location: Aravalli Range, From Alwar district and Sikar district of Rajasthan to Mahendragarh district of Haryana
- Mouth
  - location: Delhi
- Length: 50 km (31 mi)
- Discharge
  - location: Sahibi River in Haryana

Basin features
- Waterbodies: bharti Check Dam

The Dohan River (IAST: Vadhūsarā), is a rain-fed river that originates at Mandholi village near Neem Ka Thana in Sikar district of Rajasthan and then disappears in Mahendragarh district in Haryana where it used to be a tributary of Sahibi River, which in turn is a still flowing tributary of Yamuna. Its canalised portion in one of its paleochannel in Haryana is called the "Outfall Drain No 8".

At Mandholi there is a small gomukh from where the river begins.

Several Ochre Coloured Pottery culture sites (also identified as late Harappan phase of Indus Valley Civilisation culture) have been found along the banks of Krishnavati river, Sahibi river, Dohan river (tributary of Sahibi river) and Sota River (another tributary of sahibi river that merges with Sahibi at Behror in Alwar district).

== Basin ==
The Dohan River originates from Aravalli Range near the village of Mandholi from the western slopes of the Dohan Protected Forest hills and flows towards north-east. The Krishnavati River, another independent river, flows north-east for about 42 km in Rajasthan and subsequently disappears in Haryana. The drainage pattern for both is dendritic.

== Tributaries ==
These west to north-west flowing rivers originate from the western slopes of Aravalli Range in Rajasthan, flow through semi-arid historical Shekhawati region, drain into southern Haryana.

- Sahibi River, originates near Manoharpur in Sikar district flows through Haryana, along with its following tributaries:
  - Dohan River, tributary of Sahibi River, originates near Neem Ka Thana in Alwar district.
  - Sota River, tributary of Sahibi River, merges with Sahibi River at Behror in Alwar district.
  - Krishnavati River, former tributary of Sahibi River, originates near Dariba copper mines in Rajsamand district of Rajasthan, flows through Patan in Dausa district and Mothooka in Alwar district, then go to rewari and then

disappears in Mahendragarh district in Haryana much before reaching Sahibi River.

== Archaeological findings ==
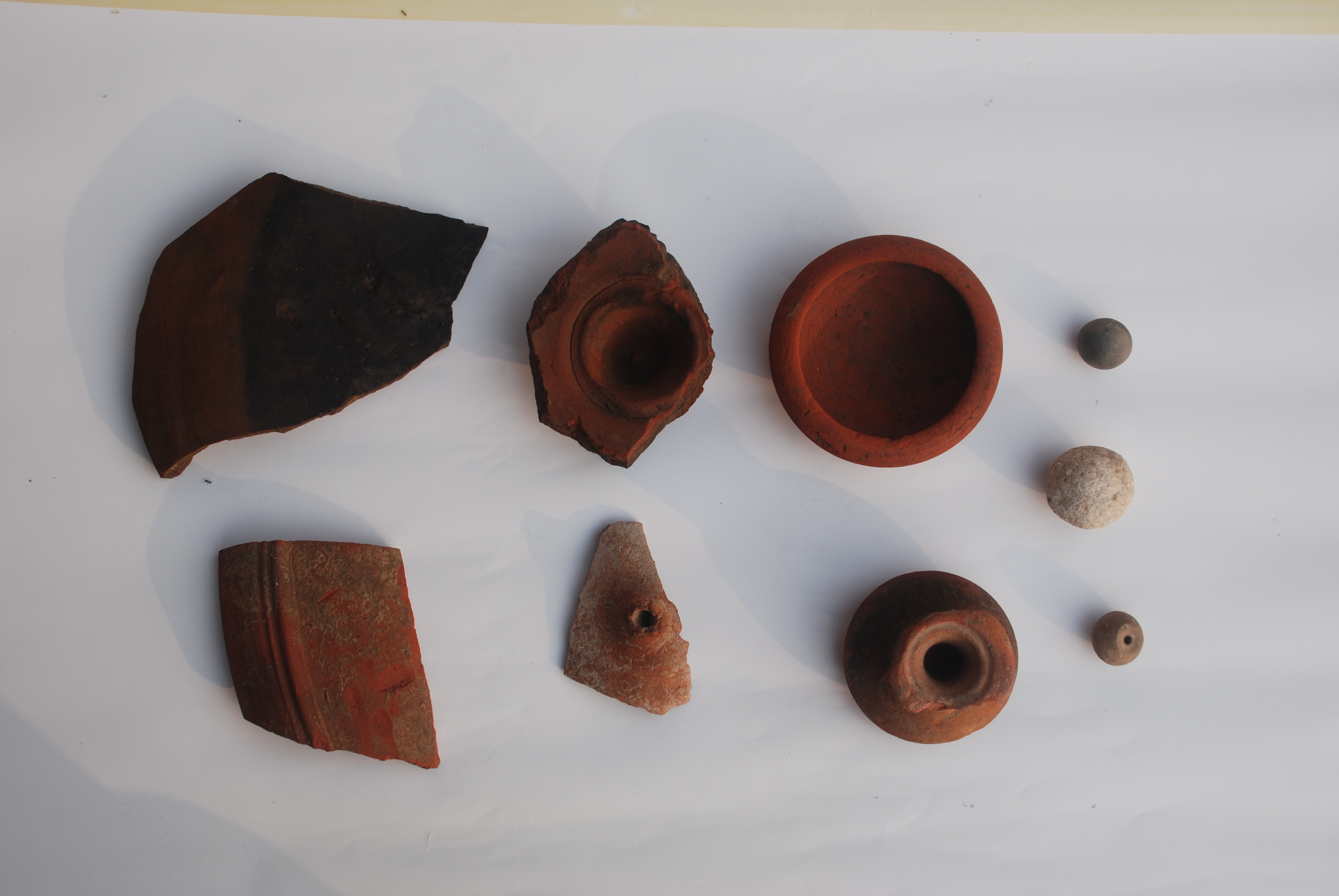
Earthenware (Pottery) found on the Sahibi riverbed by INTACH-Rewari, at Hansaka village, Rewari District, 2012

Archaeological findings on the Sahibi River have confirmed habitations on its banks before the Harappan and pre-Mahabharata periods. Both handmade and wheel-made earthenware dated from 3309–2709 BCE and 2879–2384 BCE has been found on the banks of the Sahibi River at Jodhpura. INTACH-Rewari found pottery on the Sahibi riverbed at Hansaka in the Rewari district. A red stone statue of Vamana Dev was found in the Sahibi riverbed near Bawal in 2002; the statue is now displayed at the Shri Krishna Museum, Kurukshetra. Other artifacts discovered in the Sahibi River include arrowheads, fishhooks, appearheads, awls, and chisels.

== Identification with Vedic rivers ==
Several modern scholars identify the old Ghaggar-Hakra River (of which Tangri River is a tributary) as the Sarasvati River and the Sahibi River with the Drishadvati River of Vedic period, on the banks of which, as wll as the Indus, the Indus Valley Civilisation developed. such scholars include Bhargava The Drishadwati River formed one border of the Vedic state of Brahmavarta and was mentioned in the Rigveda, the Manusmriti, and the Brahmin Granths texts.

== Gallery ==
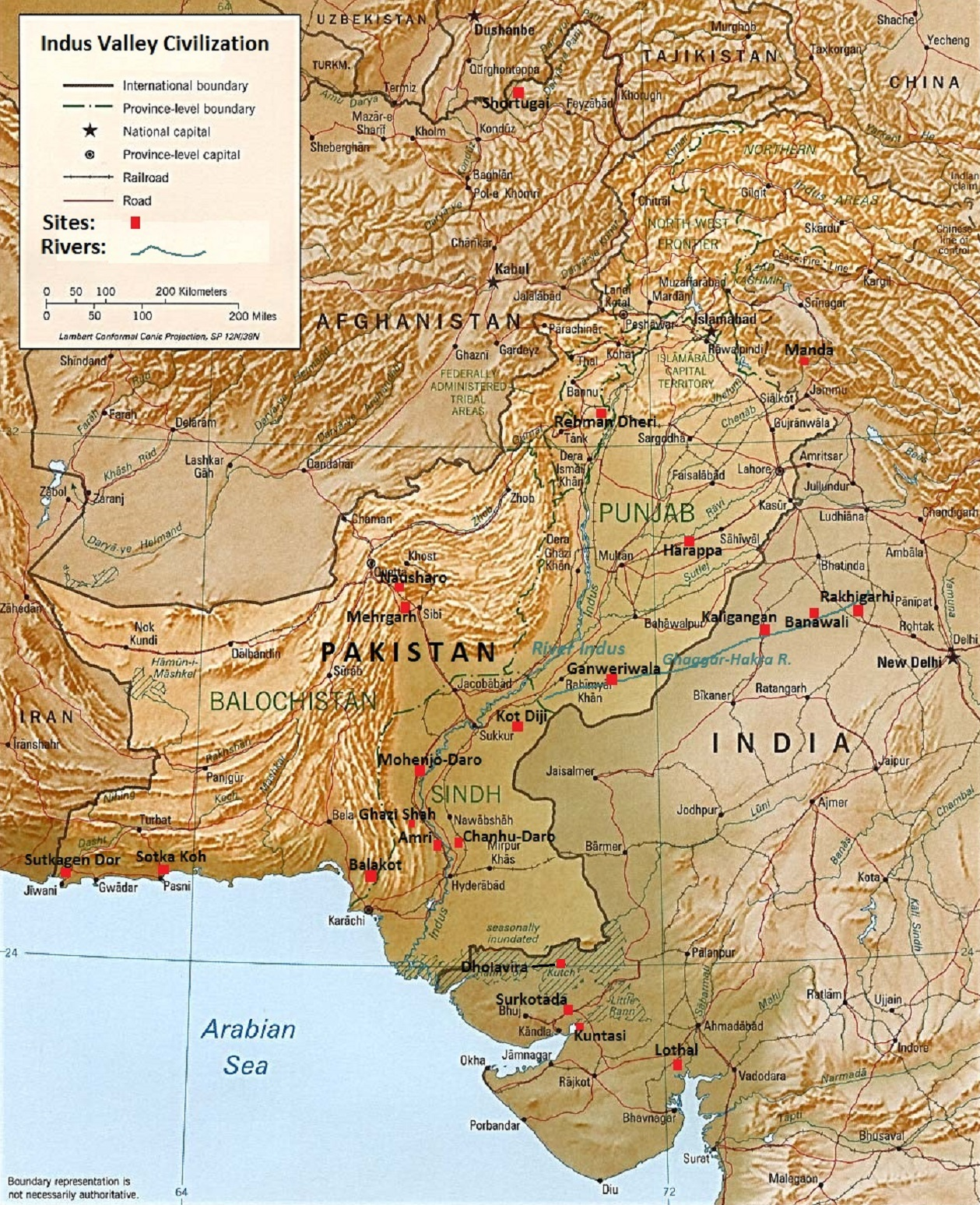
Indus–Sarasvati Civilisation major sites

== See also ==
- Chautang, a tributary of Ghaggar-Hakra River
- Kaushalya River, a tributary of Ghaggar-Hakra River
- Sarsuti, a tributary of Ghaggar-Hakra River
- Sutlej, a tributary of Indus
- Dangri, a tributary of Sarsuti
- Tangri River, a tributary of Sarsuti, merge if Dangri and Tangri are same
- Krishnavati river
- Ganges
- Indus
- Western Yamuna Canal, branches off Yamuna
- List of rivers of Rajasthan
- List of rivers of India
- List of dams and reservoirs in India
