= Masani barrage =

Coordinates: 28.20481°N 76.729245°E

Sahabi barrage and bridge
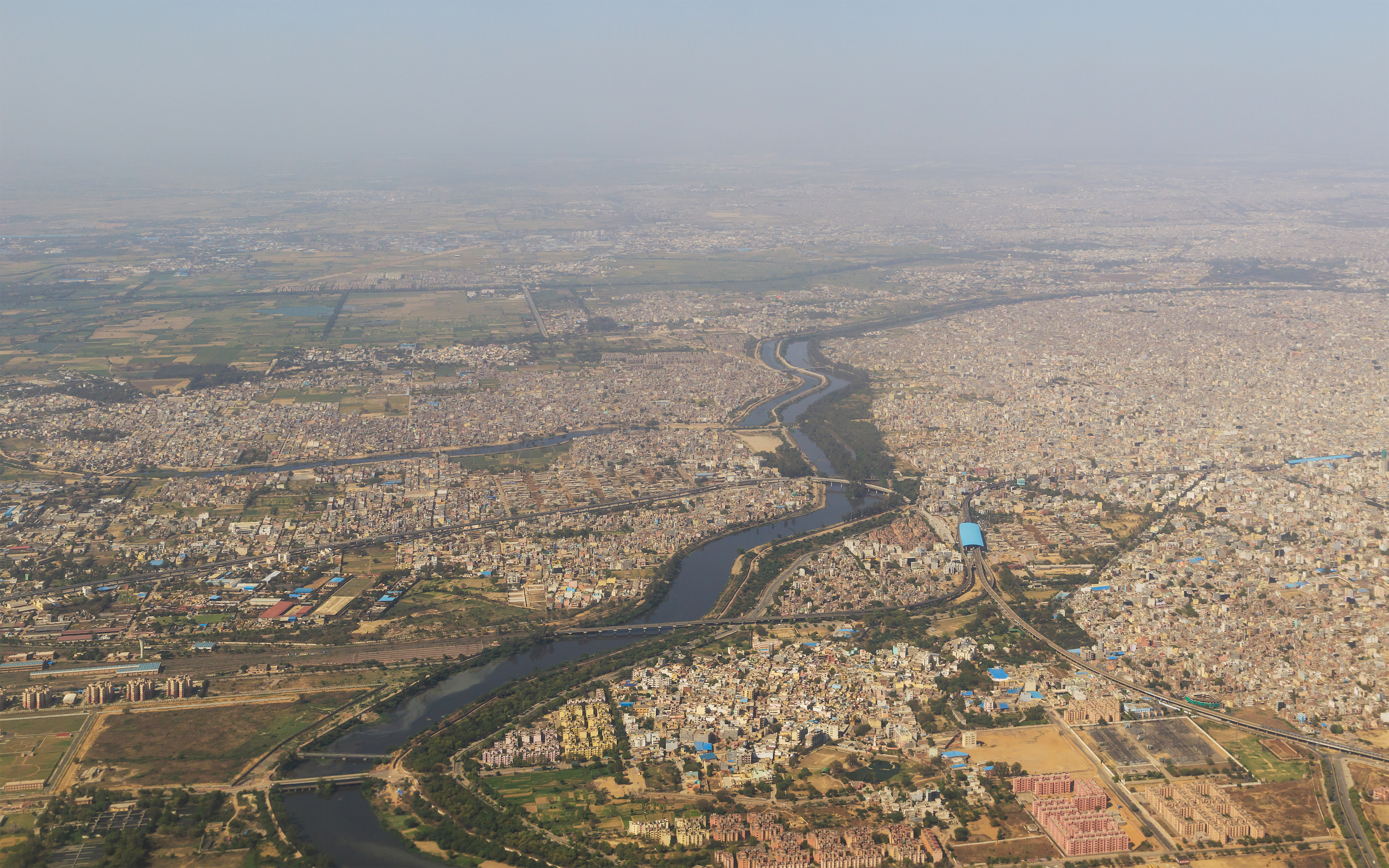
- Sahibi River at Delhi

- Location within Haryana Location within India
- Official name: Sahabi Barrage
- Country: India
- Location: Nikhri in Rewari District
- Status: Functional
- Construction began: February 1979
- Opening date: 1989

Sahabi barrage, also Masani bridge, a barrage on the seasonal Sahibi River completed in 1989, is named after the Sahabi river in Rewari District of Haryana in India. Masani barrage also serves as a bridge on NH 919. Water storage in the barrage was made perennial in 2017 after a gap of 50 years. This barrage is important part of ecological corridor along the route of Sahibi river which traverses from Aravalli Range in Rajasthan to Yamuna via Matanhail forest, Chhuchhakwas-Godhari, Khaparwas Wildlife Sanctuary, Bhindawas Wildlife Sanctuary, Outfall Drain Number 8 and 6, Sarbashirpur, Sultanpur National Park, Basai and The Lost Lake (Gurugram).

== Location and transport ==
Sahabi barrage is also used as the bridge on National highway NH 919 (former name NH 71B) which merges with national highway NH 48 (former name NH 8) (Delhi-Jaipur-Mumbai) at this barrage. Union govt announced the plan to four-lane the Masani barrage road (c. Aug 2017).

== Background ==
=== Etymology ===
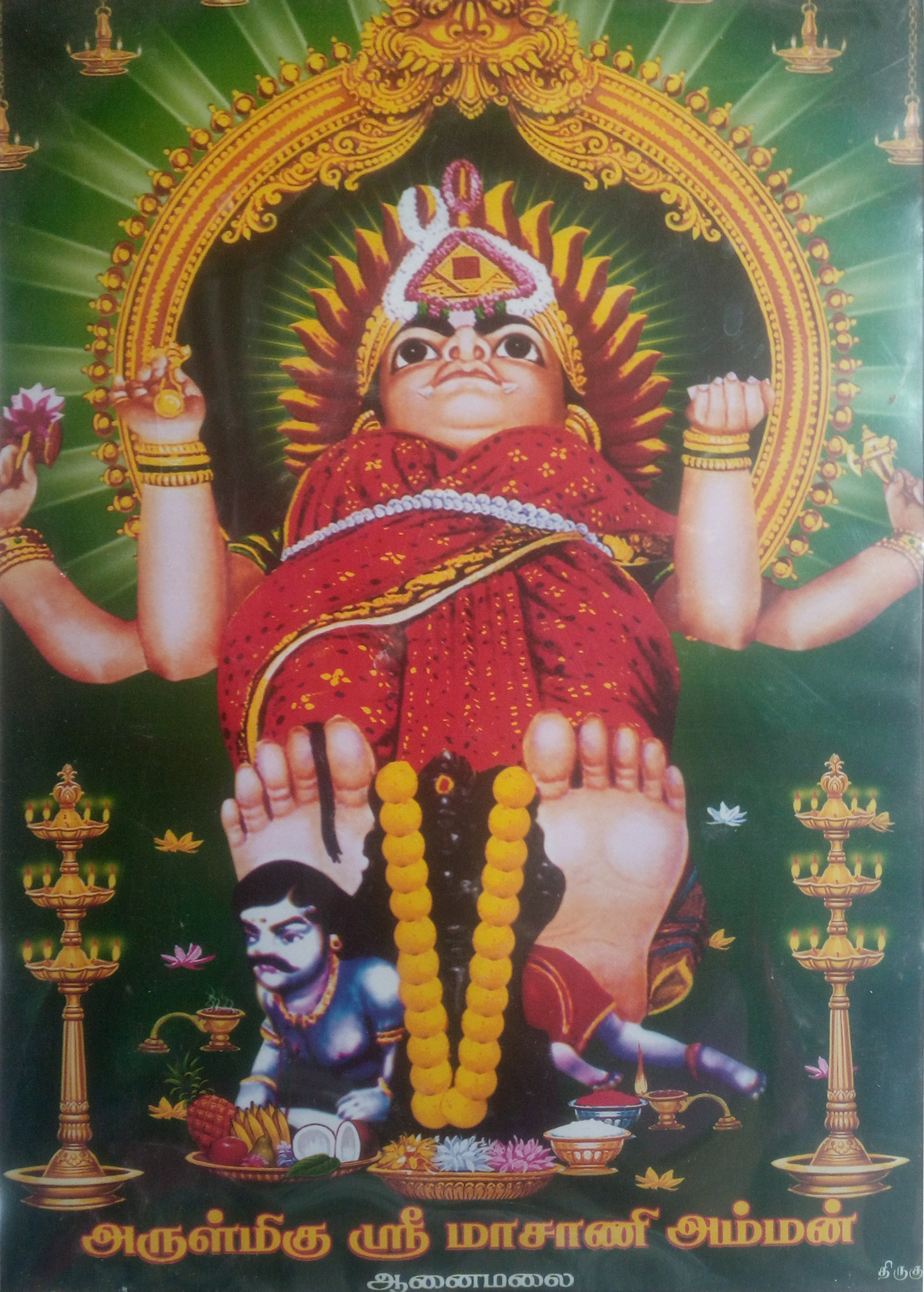
Masani Devi, a feminine avatara of Shakti Devi, lent its name to Masani village and barrage

Masani barrage is named after the Masani village in Rewari District of Haryana in India. Masani village itself is named after the Masani Devi, which itself is an avatar (manifestation) of Hindu deity Shakti Devi - a universal divine creative feminine power.

=== History ===
Barrage was built in 1989. on the seasonal Sahibi River which is 120 km long and flows from Aravalli hills in Rajasthan to South Haryana and Delhi. After Sahibi river caused floods in 1977, then Prime Minister Morarji Desai mandated a flood control and water utilization master plan for the Sahibi river basin, consequently under which construction on Masani barrage commenced in February 1979 and completed in 1989.

== Barrage ==
=== Technical details ===
It lies in the Indian seismic zone IV. It has 18 gates/bays to release water. 18 km barrage wall built at the cost of INR 50 crore has 400 acres (160 ha) to 500 acres (200 ha) resorvior to hold water.

=== Irrigation and flood control ===
Barrage was built to provide irrigation facilities to 50,000 acres in Haryana, and flood protection to 1.60 lakh acres in Haryana and 40,000 acres in Delhi.

== Wildlife ==
=== Fauna ===
Masani barrage wetland is spread over Dungerwas, Kharkhara and Nikhri villages. Over 20,000 migratory birds of 50 species from Siberia, Russia, Mongolia, Alaska and other parts of the United States are found at the barrage during the winter. Their number is rising since there is favourable habitat and easy availability of food. Bird species found here are wagtails, common teal, pintail, northern shoveller, garganey, eurasian coot, redshank, common sandpiper, ruff, wood sandpiper, marsh sandpiper, stint, kentish plover, greater sand plover, little ringed plover, white-tailed lapwing, greater flamingo, common pochard, ferruginous pochard, gulls and pied avocet. The pacific golden plover, rare a rare bird species from Western Alaska, has also been spotted. Over 4,000 migratory birds have been spotted at Bawal HSIDC wetland between Toyota Gosei Minda factory and Baba Pachpir Temple in the east HSIIDC Estate in Bawal, which is 15 km northeast from Masani barrage.

The tourism potential can be enhanced if the boating and food court are opened at Masani barrage.

== Golden Triangle ecotourism ==
Since Masani falls on the Golden Triangle tourist circuit, a large number of international and domestic tourist pass through via the national highway connecting Delhi-Agra to Jaipur and Bikaner-Jaisalmer, this is continuously being improved as a major tourist stop. Lakes here have boating, nature's trail, herbal and eco park, resthouse and lodging, food court and restroom facilities. A zoo is also under development in 2018–19.

The tourism potential can be enhanced if the boating and food court are opened.

=== Masani barrage wetland ===
The "Golden Jubilee lakes and nature park" is located immediately upstream of the barrage. Two lakes, at Masani barrage flood gates and next to Nikhri village, within immediate upstream catchment of the barrage were dugout, rejuvenated and made perennial using the water from the Lal Bahadur Shastri channel of Jawahar Lal Nehru Canal from Western Yamuna Canal. Boating facilities have been made available at these lakes. Of the planned 18 km nature's trail along its bank under development, 6 km have been readied already by August 2018. The lakes are an important feeding and breeding ground for large number of migratory birds who arrive here every year.

=== Rajiv Gandhi Herbal Park and Nature Camp ===
This is located immediately downstream of the barrage, on the right side i.e. east flank of the barrage water/flood gates. Rajiv Gandhi Herbal Park and Nature Camp, Masani, was set up on floodplain of Masani barrage in 2011 by Haryana government to promote ecotourism. It entails a herbal conservation park, ayurveda center, wetlands and children park set up by the Forests Department, Haryana. Haryana Tourism has also made log huts accommodation, tree houses, nature trails and dining facilities. Haryana Forest Development Corporation is building an adventure tourism centre, with a one km long ropeway, on 45 acres of land at Masani barrage (c. Mar 2017).

== Ecological concerns ==
1970s-80s plans to recharge the subsoil water (plunged to 100 ft depth) vanished with the continual reduction in rainfall and construction of several dams over the Sahibi river in Rajasthan, resulting in basin of the Masani Barrage remaining dry since the late 1980s.

Entire 100 km stretch of Sahibi river and its streams (Sota River, Kotkasim drain and Indori River) in Haryana are ecologically dead. Gurugram also dumps polluted discharge in the riverbed of Sahibi.

=== Restoration ===
==== Rajasthan-Haryana efforts to rejuvenating the lost course ====
Upstream of Masani Barrage, there are large patches of isolated forests and dried lake beds running adjacent to the course of seasonal Sahibi, such as near the villages of Bolni, Bidawas, Jhabuwa, Jat Bhagola, Ajarka, Manethi, Karni Kot and Neemrana, which could be made perennial with excess water thus creating an interconnected-wetlands based eco-corridor in the Delhi Supergroup of Aravalli Range from Sariska Tiger Reserve to various nature and national parks of Delhi Ridge up to the national capital of New Delhi.

Government of Haryana is coordinating with Government of Rajasthan to ensure water reaches usually-dry masani barrage and dying seasonal Sahibi River. Another government project is being implemented to direct the extra water of Yamuna River during monsoon to Masani barrage through Jawahar Lal Nehru Canal and Western Yamuna Canal (c. July 2015). In 2016, govt decided to disallow farming on 700 acre land around Masani barrage floodplain of Sahibi River, annually leased to the farmers since 1979, and the land was returned to the forest department for expanding the wetland and reforested area. During 3 months monsoon season surplus water is available from Yamuna which is brought here to create a reservoir of 15 to 20 feet high water, during dry season the treated sewage water from Rewari and Dharuhera is brought to this barrage to make it prennial.

==== Harayana government efforts: Proposed Wetland notification for Masani barrage ====
SWAH (State Wetland Authority of Haryana), which is "actively exploring notifying the 160–200 hectare Masani Barrage reservoir as a protected wetland" which "would impose strict legal penalties and environmental standards on wastewater dumping" demanded the action-taken report from the Rewari district administration on wastewater disposal norms at Masani Barrage amid concerns over rising pollution and imposed Rs4 cr penalty on Haryana's PHED (Public Health and Engineering Department) which dumped semi-untreated water from the 5 STPs in the Masani Barrage. On 22 April 2026, PHED clarified that 3 STP were already complaint and remaining 2 STP which were undergoung trail will be complaint with "under 10 mg/l" standard by after one week, i.e. by the end of April 2026.

==== Haryana-Delhi efforts to rejuvenating the lost course ====
Downstream of Masani Barrage, the section from Dhansa Regulator on Delhi-Haryana Border to Yamuna River was officially labelled as the Sahibi River in 1807 revenue records but relabelled as the Najafgarh Drain in 1907 revenue records as per Delhi's IFC (Irrigation and Flood Control) Department's legally binding submission to India's NGT (National Green Tribunal). IFI submission to NGT recommends that reverting the name to Sahibi River for this section will gain public support for the rejuvenation.

In 2025 under the wider Yamuna Rejuvenation Project, the joint Haryana-Delhi project was initiated to rejuvenate the lost course of Sahibi river which was lost between Masani Barrage at Haryana-Rajasthan border to Dhansa Regulator at Haryana-Delhi border, under which canalised Outfall Drain No 8 and Aurangpur Link Drain in Haryana were notified as the official course of Sahibi River and only the 11 km link between Masani Bbarrage and Outfall Drain No 8 remained lost as it was under the private ownership. An underground pipeline from Masani Barrage to Outfall Drain No 8 is constructed under this 11 km lost channel of Sahibi where land is privately owned. Simultaneously, countour mapping process was underway in 2025 to identify this private land across 11 km, measuring 350 acre, so that the government can purchase this land. However, the farmers have refused to sell the land at circle rate. This land still remains unacquired, and higher budget allocation is needed to acquire the land at market rate.

In Feb 2026, HSPCB (Haryana State Pollution Control Board) water sampling exercise at the Masani barrage found biochemical oxygen demand (BOD) of 30 milligrams per litre (mg/l), far above the prescribed limit of 10 mg/l, and 5 STPs (severage treatment plants) in the area were ordered to improve their BOD levels and consequenly their membrane and filters were replaced to meet the requirements. Commission for Air Quality Management (CAQM) also instructed the HSPCB to solve the pollution levels at the Masani Barrage. In Octobr 2026, Rs217 cr project commenced which entails the tertiary water treatment plant with 2 segment tanks for the pollutted industrial water from Bhiwadi and Rewari (including Dharuhera and Bawal industrail townships), underground 40 km pipeline from barrage to Outfall Drain No 8, creation of 3 waterbodies by collecting rainwater and treated water for grpound water recharge to benefit 15 villages, Rs 125 cr out of which have been released for the 3-month long phase-I of this project.

== See also ==
- Delhi Ridge
- Leopards of Haryana
- Gurugram leopard and deer safari
- History of Haryana
- List of dams and reservoirs in Haryana
- List of National Parks & Wildlife Sanctuaries of Haryana, India
- Kotla and Nuh System of Lakes
- Dhosi Hill
- Sariska Tiger Reserve
- Masani Amman, a form of Shakti Devi
- List of dams and reservoirs in Haryana
