= Bhindawas Wildlife Sanctuary =

Protected area in Haryana, India

- IUCN category IV (habitat/species management area)
- Location within Haryana Location within India
- Interactive map of Bhindawas Wildlife Sanctuary
- Location: Jind district, Haryana, India
- Coordinates: 28.532580°N 76.551511°E
- Area: 4.12
- Established: 1986
- Governing body: Forests Department, Haryana
- Website: www.haryanaforest.gov.in

Ramsar Wetland
- Designated: 25 May 2021
- Reference no.: 2459

Bhindawas Wildlife Sanctuary Ramsar site is located in Jhajjar district, which is about 15 km from Jhajjar in Haryana. On 3 June 2009, it is also declared as bird sanctuary by the Indian Government.

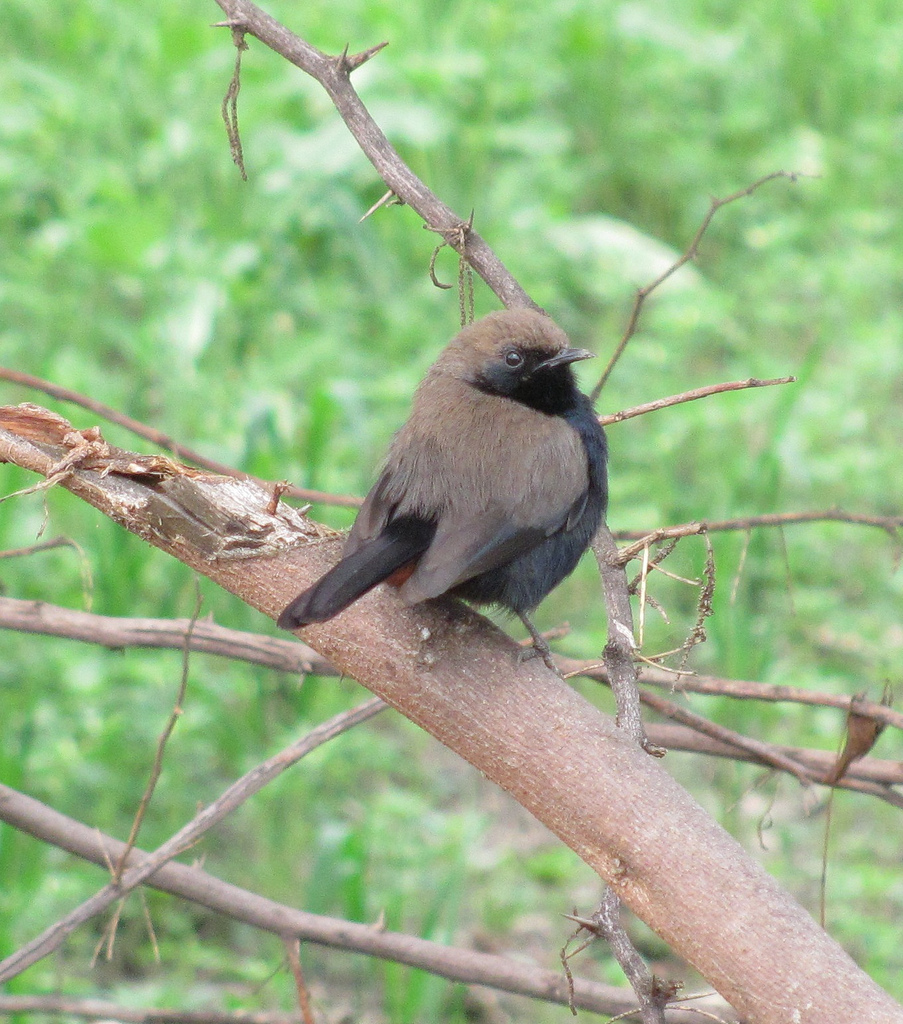
Indian Robin

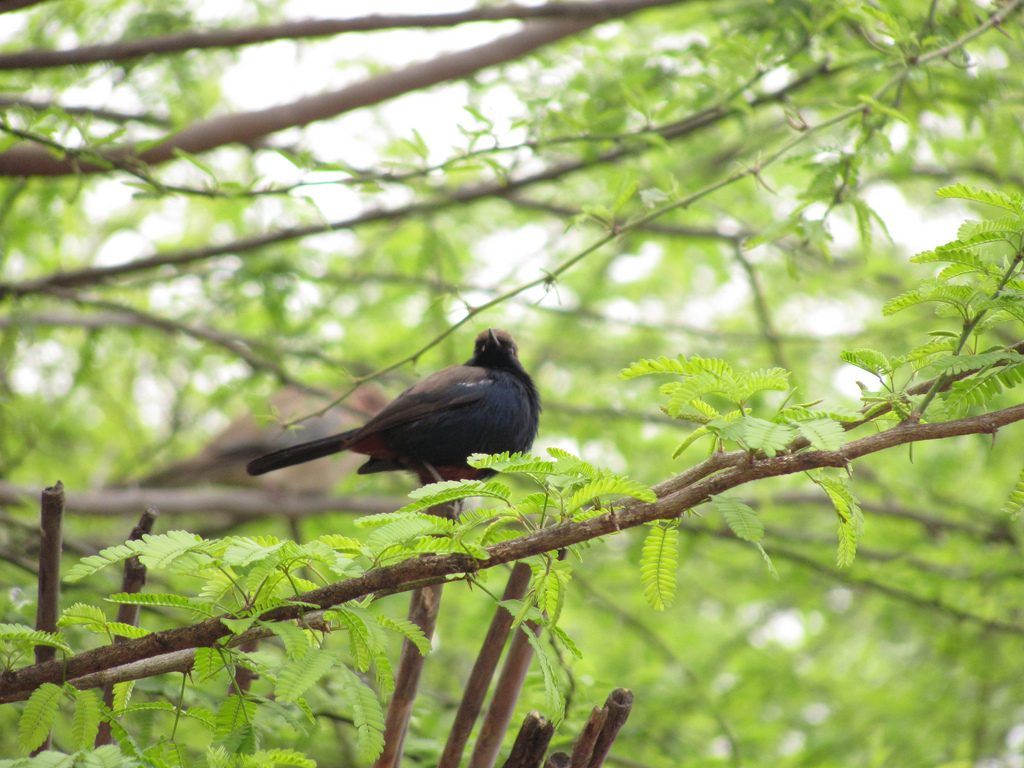
Saxicoloides fulicatus at Bhindawas

This is an important part of ecological corridor along the route of the Sahibi River which traverses from Aravalli hills in Rajasthan to Yamuna via Masani barrage, Matanhail forest, Chhuchhakwas-Godhari, Khaparwas Wildlife Sanctuary, Bhindawas Wildlife Sanctuary, Outfall Drain Number 6 (canalised portion in Haryana of Sahibi river), Outfall Drain Number 8 (canalised portion in Haryana of Dohan river which is a tributary of Sahibi river), Sarbashirpur, Sultanpur National Park, Basai Wetland and The Lost Lake of Gurugram. It lies 5 km northwest of Bhindawas Bird Sanctuary and 46 km northwest of Sultanpur National Park via road.

== Location ==
This 411.55 hectares sanctuary is located 15 km from Jhajjar on the Jhajjar-Kasani road and 105 km from Delhi. Bhindawas Wildlife Sanctuary is only 1.5 km from Khaparwas Wildlife Sanctuary and it is located here map. Niwada, Bhindawas, Chandol, Chadhwana, Bilochpura, Reduwas and Kasni are the adjacent village.

== History ==
Forests Department, Haryana of Government of Haryana officially notified this 411.55 hectares area as Wildlife Sanctuary on 5 July 1985.

== Bhindawas lake ==
Rain water, JLN Feeder canal and its escape channel are main source of water in the bird sanctuary.

== Nearby Attraction ==
- Khaparwas Wildlife Sanctuary - 1.5 km from Bhindawas Wildlife Sanctuary.

== See also ==
- List of National Parks & Wildlife Sanctuaries of Haryana, India
- Haryana Tourism
- List of Monuments of National Importance in Haryana
- List of State Protected Monuments in Haryana
- List of Indus Valley Civilization sites in Haryana, Punjab, Rajasthan, Gujarat, India & Pakistan
- Sultanpur National Park
- Okhla Sanctuary, bordering Delhi in adjoining Uttar Pradesh
- Nearby Najafgarh drain bird sanctuary, Delhi
- Nearby Najafgarh lake or Najafgarh jheel (Now completely drained by Najafgarh drain)
- National Zoological Park Delhi
- Asola Bhatti Wildlife Sanctuary, Delhi
- Bhalswa horseshoe lake, Delhi
- Black francolin, Haryana State Bird (राज्य पक्षी हरियाणा-काला तीतर)
