= Khaparwas Wildlife Sanctuary =

Protected area in Haryana, India

- IUCN category IV (habitat/species management area)
- Interactive map of Khaparwas Wildlife Sanctuary
- Governing body: Forests Department, Haryana
- Website: haryanaforest.gov.in

Khaparwas Bird Sanctuary is a bird sanctuary in Jhajjar district, about 80 kilometres (50 mi) west of Delhi). The reserve covers 82.70 hectares. This is an important part of ecological corridor along the route of Sahibi River which traverses from Aravalli hills in Rajasthan to Yamuna via Masani barrage, Matanhail forest, Chhuchhakwas-Godhari, Khaparwas Wildlife Sanctuary, Bhindawas Wildlife Sanctuary, Outfall Drain Number 8 and 6, Sarbashirpur, Sultanpur National Park, Basai and The Lost Lake (Gurugram). It lies 5 km northwest of Bhindawas Bird Sanctuary and 46 km northwest of Sultantpur National Park via road.

The Adjacent villages are Khaparwas, Bhindawas, Chandol, Dhakla and Surehti.

== History ==
The Forests Department, Haryana of Government of Haryana officially declared this to be a Wildlife Sanctuary on 30 January 1987.

== Khaparwas Lake ==
Rainwater, JLN Feeder Canal and its escape channel are main source of water in the bird sanctuary.

== Nearby Attraction ==
- Bhindawas Wildlife Sanctuary 1.5 km from Khaparwas Wildlife Sanctuary.

== See also ==
- List of National Parks & Wildlife Sanctuaries of Haryana, India
- Haryana Tourism
- List of Monuments of National Importance in Haryana
- List of State Protected Monuments in Haryana
- Sultanpur National Park
- Okhla Sanctuary, bordering Delhi in adjoining Uttar Pradesh
- Nearby Najafgarh drain bird sanctuary, Delhi
- Nearby Najafgarh lake or Najafgarh jheel (Now completely drained by Najafgarh drain)
- National Zoological Park Delhi
- Asola Bhatti Wildlife Sanctuary, Delhi
- Bhalswa horseshoe lake, Delhi
