= Chhuchhakwas =

Chhutadawas islamgarh
- nangad village
- Location in Haryana, India Chhutadawas (India)
- Coordinates: 28.583203°N 76.526341°E
- Country: India
- State: Haryana
- District: Jhajjar

Government
  - Type: Democracy

Population (2011)
  - Total: About 6,000
  - Density: 2,856/km^{2} (7,400/sq mi)

Languages
  - Official: Hindi
- Time zone: UTC+5:30 (IST)
- PIN: 124106
- Telephone code: 01251
- ISO 3166 code: IN-HR
- Vehicle registration: HR- 14
- Coastline: 0 kilometres (0 mi)
- Nearest city: Jhajjar
- Sex ratio: .903 ♂/♀
- Literacy: 70%%
- Lok Sabha constituency: Rohtak
- Climate: extreme (Köppen)
- Avg. summer temperature: 40 °C (104 °F)
- Avg. winter temperature: 15 °C (59 °F)
- Website: haryana.gov.in

Chhuchhakwas is a village in Jhajjar district of Haryana state, India, having pincode 124106, located 13 km from district headquarters on NH334B. Majority in the village are Ahirs which popularly known as Rao Sahab.

== Ecological corridor ==
The water bodies around canal between Godhari and Chhuchakwas are the important part of ecological corridor along the route of Sahibi River which traverses from Aravalli hills in Rajasthan to Yamuna via Masani barrage, Matanhail forest, Chhuchhakwas-Godhari, Khaparwas Wildlife Sanctuary, Bhindawas Wildlife Sanctuary, Outfall Drain Number 8 and 6, Sarbashirpur, Sultanpur National Park, Basai and The Lost Lake (Gurugram).

== See also ==
- List of National Parks & Wildlife Sanctuaries of Haryana, India
- History of Haryana
