= Markanda River (Haryana) =

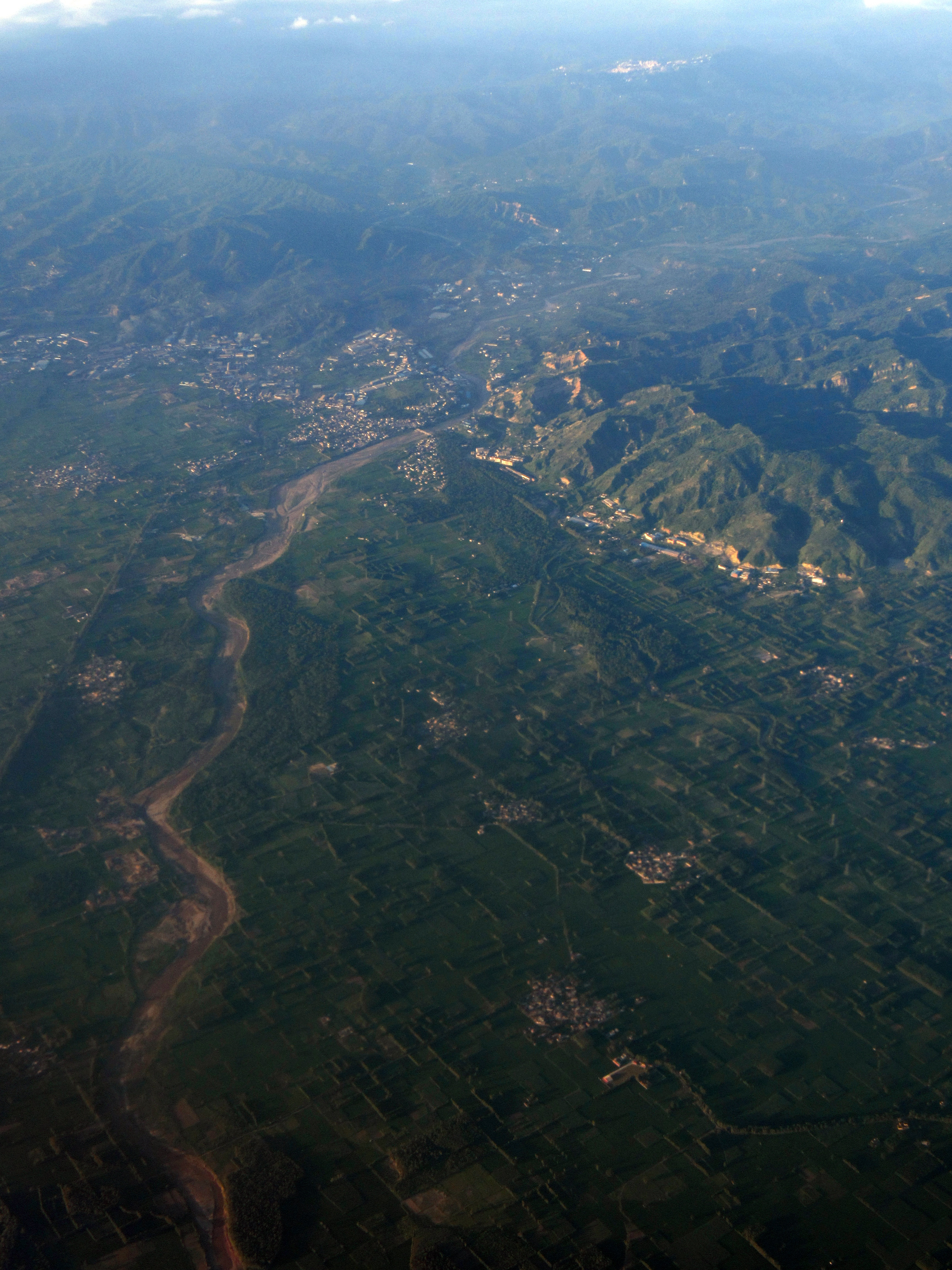
- Native name: मारकंडा नदी (Hindi)

Location
- Country: India

Physical characteristics
- Source
  - location: Near Katasan Devi Temple, Baraban, Sirmaur District, Himachal Pradesh
- Mouth: Ghaggar River
  - location: Himachal Pradesh, India
  - coordinates: 30°05′26″N 76°23′39″E
- Length: 90 km (56 mi)

Basin features
- Tributaries
  - left: Begna river, Ran, nakati
- Waterbodies: Jalbehra barrage in Kurukshetra
- Bridges: Markanda Bridge, Haryana

The Markanda (Hindi: मारकंडा नदी) is a river in the Indian states of Himachal Pradesh and Haryana. It is a tributary of the Ghaggar river, flowing through Sirmaur District, Ambala district and Shahabad Markanda, a town in Kurukshetra district. The Markanda river's ancient name was Aruna.

== Origin and route ==
The Markanda river is an eponymous seasonal river in Haryana state, which is a main tributary of the Ghaggar River.

The Markanda originates in the Shivalik hills on the border of Haryana and Himachal Pradesh states, and flows along the Haryana and Punjab, India border before meeting with the Ghaggar river.

The basin is classified in two parts, Khadir and Bangar, the higher area that is not flooded in rainy season is called Bangar and the lower flood-prone area is called Khadar.

Several archaeologists identify the old Ghaggar-Hakra River as the Sarasvati river, on the banks of which the Indus Valley civilisation developed.

== Gallery ==
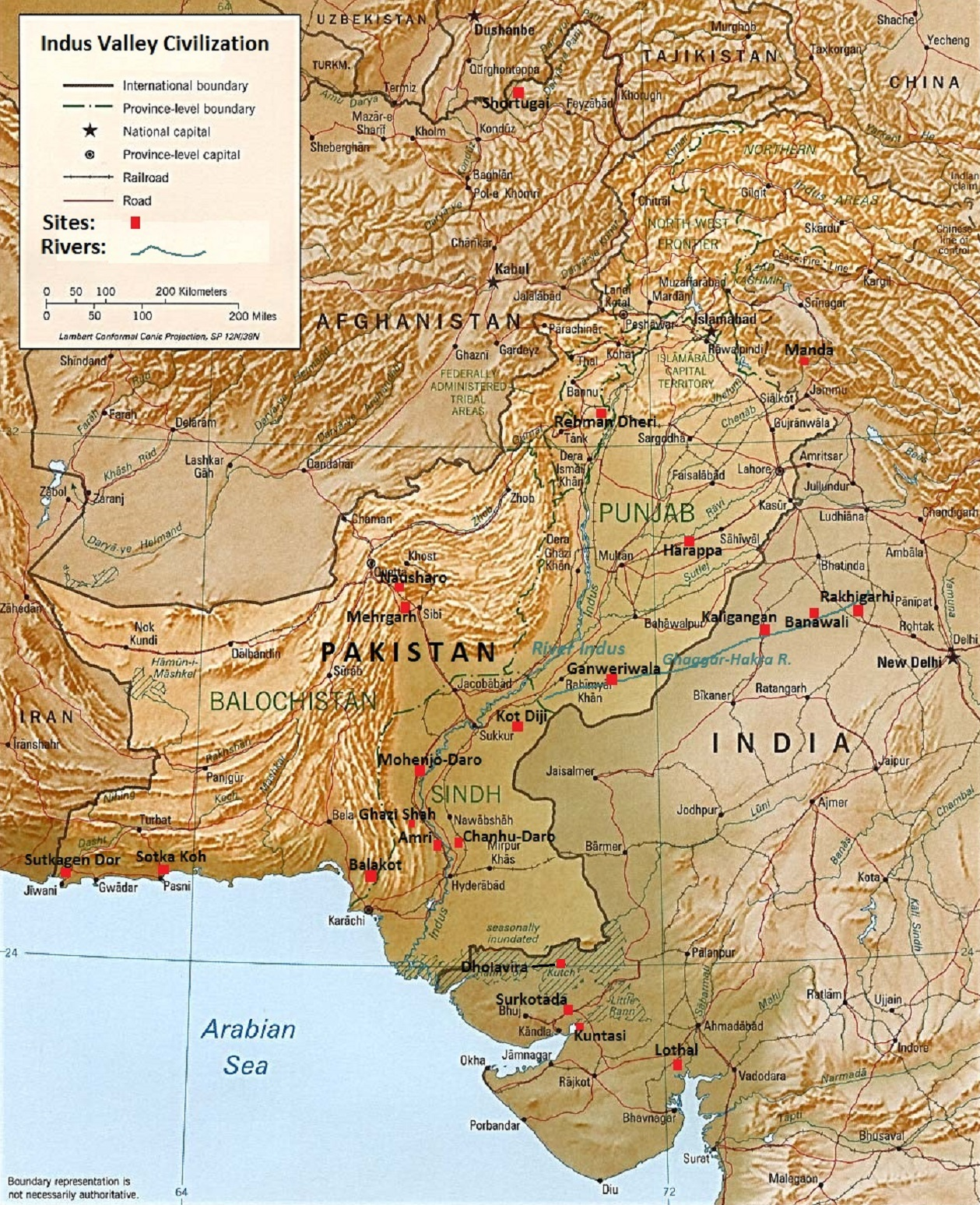
Indus–Sarasvati civilisation major sites

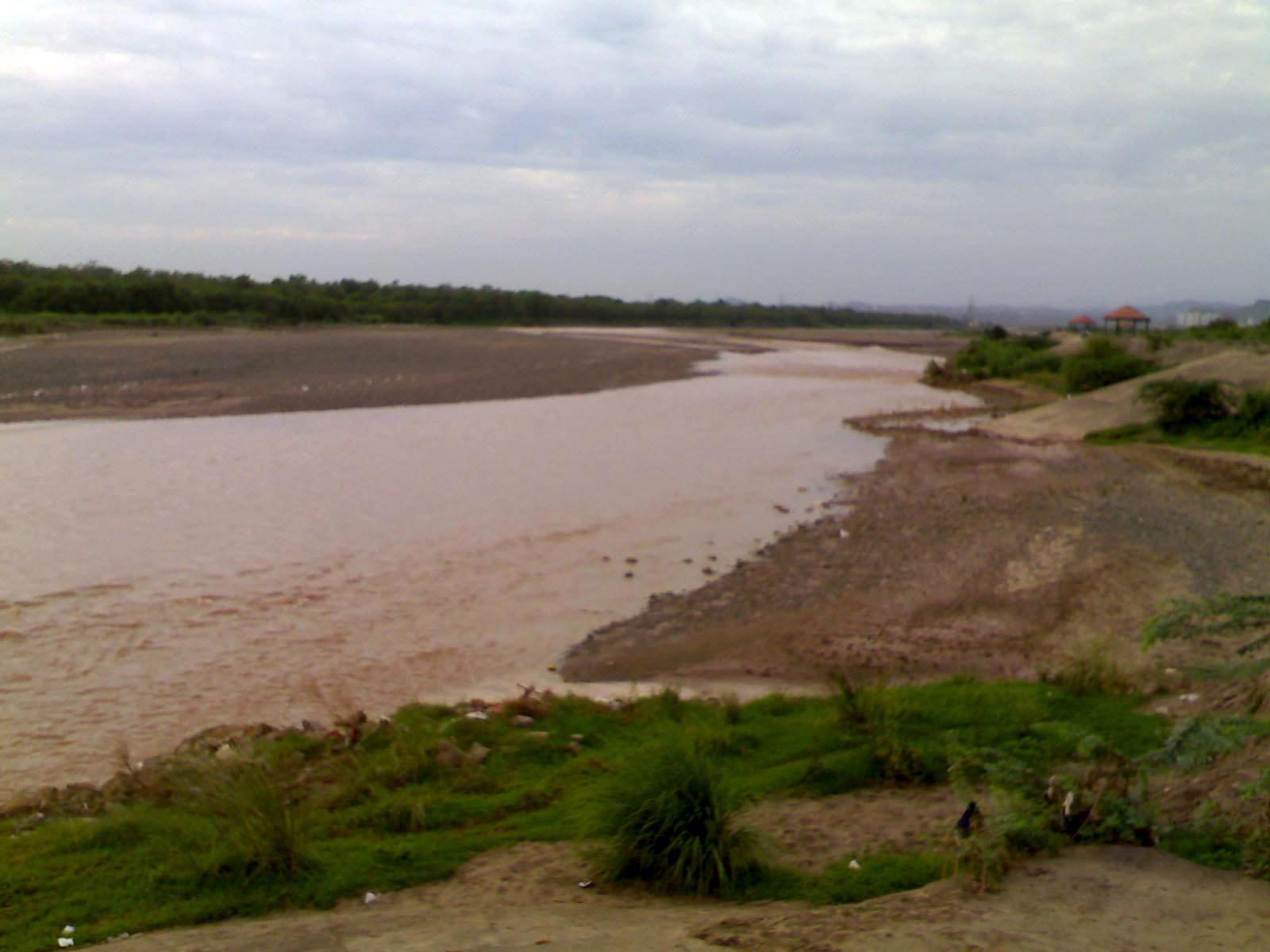
Ghaggar river flowing through Panchkula in Haryana

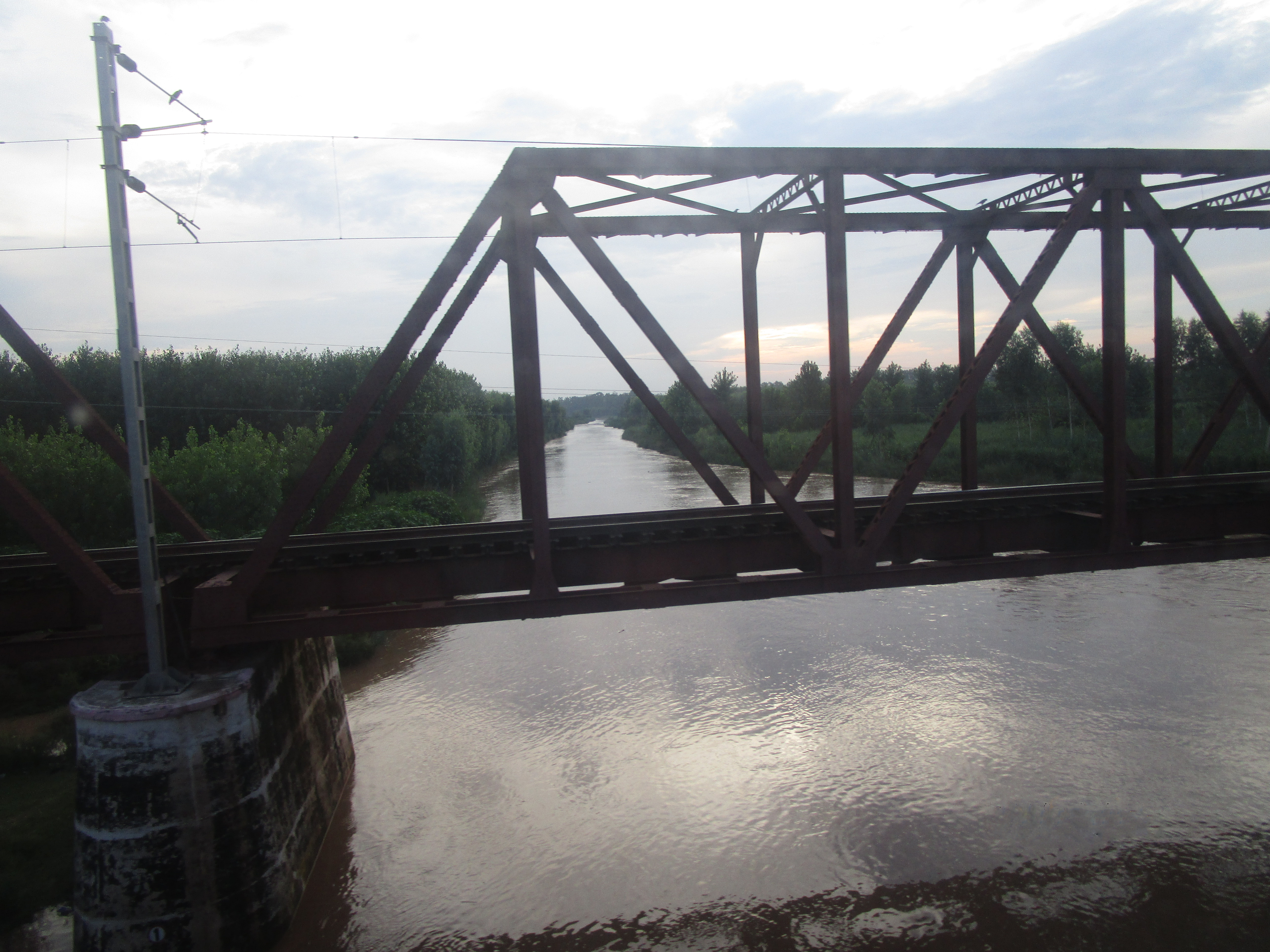
Markanda River at Markanda, Haryana

== See also ==
- Ganges
- Indus
- Sutlej, a tributary of Indus
- Sarsuti, a tributary of Ghaggar-Hakra River
- Dangri or Tangri river, a tributary of Sarsuti
- Chautang, a tributary of Ghaggar-Hakra River
- Kaushalya river, a tributary of Ghaggar-Hakra River
- Western Yamuna Canal, branches off Yamuna
