= REI Agro Limited =

Indian FMCG Company

REI AGRO.
- Company type: Public
- Traded as: LSE: REI; BSE: 532106; NSE: REIAGRO
- Industry: FMGC
- Headquarters: Kolkata
- Area served: Worldwide
- Products: Rice

REI Agro Limited is an Indian FMGC (Fast Moving Consumer Goods) company. The company has paddy and rice processing units producing Basmati rice in Bawal, Haryana.

== History ==
REI Agro was founded by Sandeep and Sanjay Jhunjhunwala. From modest beginnings, the company has grown to hold the largest market share of the Basmati rice segment worldwide. REI ups is its ability to mature Basmati rice for 18–24 months. Today, REI Agro is an integrated player, undertaking activities right from procuring paddy to milling, polishing, branding, distribution and retailing. Offering brands like Raindrops BASMATI RICE, Kasauti, to cater to all price ranges, REI Agro's products can be found from the smallest kirana store to the biggest retail chains such as 6 Ten, Reliance Fresh, Walmart, Metro. With Basmati also having a large international demand, REI also has its brands in the Middle East. REI Agro has been declared NPA by most of the Public Sector Banks like Indian Overseas Bank, Bank of Baroda and others. Before being declared NPA, REI claimed to control 22 percent market share of the World Basmati rice market. As on 2017 REI Agro has gone for liquidation.
