= Ganga Sahai =

19th-century Sanskrit scholar

- Other names: Ganga Sahaya, Ganga Sahay, Gangasahaya
- Occupation: Dewan of Bundi State (1877-1913)
- Known for: Sanskrit scholarship

Pandit Ganga Sahai, also known as Ganga Sahaya, was a late 19th-century Sanskrit scholar. He was the Dewan of Bundi State in British India from 1877 to 1913.

Ganga Sahai belonged to the Nyaya school of Hindu philosophy. He transliterated and translated the Bhagavata Purana from archaic Sanskrit to a more easily understood form of Sanskrit being spoken at that time in the scholarly community. This commentary is known as "Anvitartha Prakashika". His work was published by the Venkateshwara Press in Bombay, India in 1901.

In all, he wrote 127 books during his life (1877–1930) including "Vans Prakash" which details the history of Bundi State. Sahai was born in a highly educated family of Gaur Brahmins in the village of Patan, District Sikar, Rajputana. Originally educated in Patan by his parents and the Pundits of Patana, he eventually was advised by the Pundits to go to Benares, where he would learn all of the Shastras, Vedas, Puranas and Upanishads. In a very brief period of just two years, the renowned and most highly respected Acharyas of Kashi declared him to be a Master of the Scriptures and stated that he had become so highly advanced that he was worthy of instructing them further. During a visit to Patan, the Maharao (ruler) of Bundi met Ganga Sahai and sought his advice in administrating the state of Bundi. Ganga Sahai thus became the Dewan of Bundi.

Ganga Sahai held the titles "Kamdar" and Pandit. He was the author of Prabandh Sar (1880), one of the oldest codified law books in present-day Rajasthan. Before that, the local law was primarily based on traditions and customs.

One gate in the Bundi city is also in the name of Pandit Ganga Sahai.
