= Matanhail =

Village in India

Matanhail is a large village and headquarter of eponymous Matanhail Tehsil and Block in Jhajjar District of Haryana, India. It belongs to Rohtak Division. It is located 22 km west of the District headquarters Jhajjar. It is a tehsil headquarter. Matanhail's Pin code is 124106 and postal head office is Matanhail. Matanhail tehsil shares border with Rewari and Charkhi Dadri. Village was founded by Suhag (Sihag) clan jats.

== Forests ==
Matanhail has a large forested area to its west, which is part of the area's ecological corridor. This forest is important part of ecological corridor along the route of Sahibi River which traverses from Aravalli hills in Rajasthan to Yamuna via Masani barrage, Matanhail forest, Chhuchhakwas-Godhari, Khaparwas Wildlife Sanctuary, Bhindawas Wildlife Sanctuary, Outfall Drain Number 8 and 6, Sarbashirpur, Sultanpur National Park, Basai and The Lost Lake (Gurugram).

== Education ==
There are six schools of which three are government, two are private and one is KV which started working from April 2017. Govt. In 2018, Haryana govt announced the establishment of third Sainik School of the state in Matanhail on 38 acres for which INR50 crore (500 million) has been released. The village also has an elementary school, a girls senior secondary school and a main senior secondary school for boys and girls along with newly opened Kendriya Vidyalaya for primary children run by government.

- Govt. College Matanhail
- Govt. ITI
- Kendriya Vidyalaya
- Sainik School, announced
- Govt. Girls Sr. Sec. School
- Govt. Sr. Sec. School for Boys & Girls
- Govt. Primary School
- M.D. High School
- Hindu High School
- KIIT-JEE School

== Other ==
Grain Mandi

Vita milk Plant

132 KV Power House, Matanhail ( UHBVN)

== Adjacent villages ==
- Khaparwas (2 km)
- Mundsa (3 km)
- Bir Chhuchakwas (5 km)
- Godhri (5 km)
- Khetawas (6 km)
- NIMLI (4 km)
- Ruriyawas (3 km)

are the nearby villages to Matanhail. Matanhail is surrounded by Salhawas Tehsil towards the south, Beri Tehsil towards the north, Jhajjar Tehsil towards the east, Dadri-I Tehsil towards the west. Jhajjar, Charkhi Dadri, Rohtak, Bhiwani are the nearby cities to Matanhail.

== Notable people ==
- Hukam Singh Suhag
- Geeta Bhukkal
- Jai Singh Agrawal

== See also ==
- List of National Parks & Wildlife Sanctuaries of Haryana, India
- History of Haryana
