= Patan, Rajasthan =

Patan
- city
- Location in Rajasthan, India Patan (India)
- Coordinates: 27.8051°N 75.9801°E
- Country: India
- State: Rajasthan
- District: Sikar
- Founder: Anangpal Tanwar

Population (2011)
  - Total: 7,004
- Demonym: TANWARAWATI

Languages
  - Official: Tanwarawati (Rajasthani & hindi)
- Time zone: UTC+5:30 (IST)
- PIN: 332718
- Vehicle registration: RJ 23
- Nearest city: Neem Ka Thana
- Lok Sabha constituency: Sikar

Patan is a city in the Indian state of Rajasthan. In the 12th century, Patan became the centre of a minor state called Tanwarawati or Torawati, ruled by a Tanwar /Tomar family. Patan has a total population of 7,004 peoples according to Census 2011.

== Battle of Patan ==
In the eighteenth century the Maratha warrior Alijah Shrinath Mahdhojirao (alias Mahadji Shinde) won the battle against the Rajput armies of Jaipur. Today's Jaipur and Jodhpur were on one side and on the other side was the army of Shrinath Mahadji Shinde supported by De Boigne. of 19 June 1790 between the Marathas with French troops and the Rao Rajputs of Jaipur and Jodhpur. For details of the battle and the role of De Boigne see Jadunath Sarkar.

== See also ==
- Ganga Sahai
