= Drishadvati River =

River

The Drishadvati River (IAST:Dṛṣad-vatī, "She with many stones") is a river hypothesized by Indologists to identify the route of the Vedic river Saraswati and the state of Brahmavarta. According to Manusmriti, the Brahmavarta, where the Rishis composed the Vedas and other Sanskrit texts of the Vedic religion, was at the confluence of the Saraswati and Drishadvati rivers during the Vedic period.

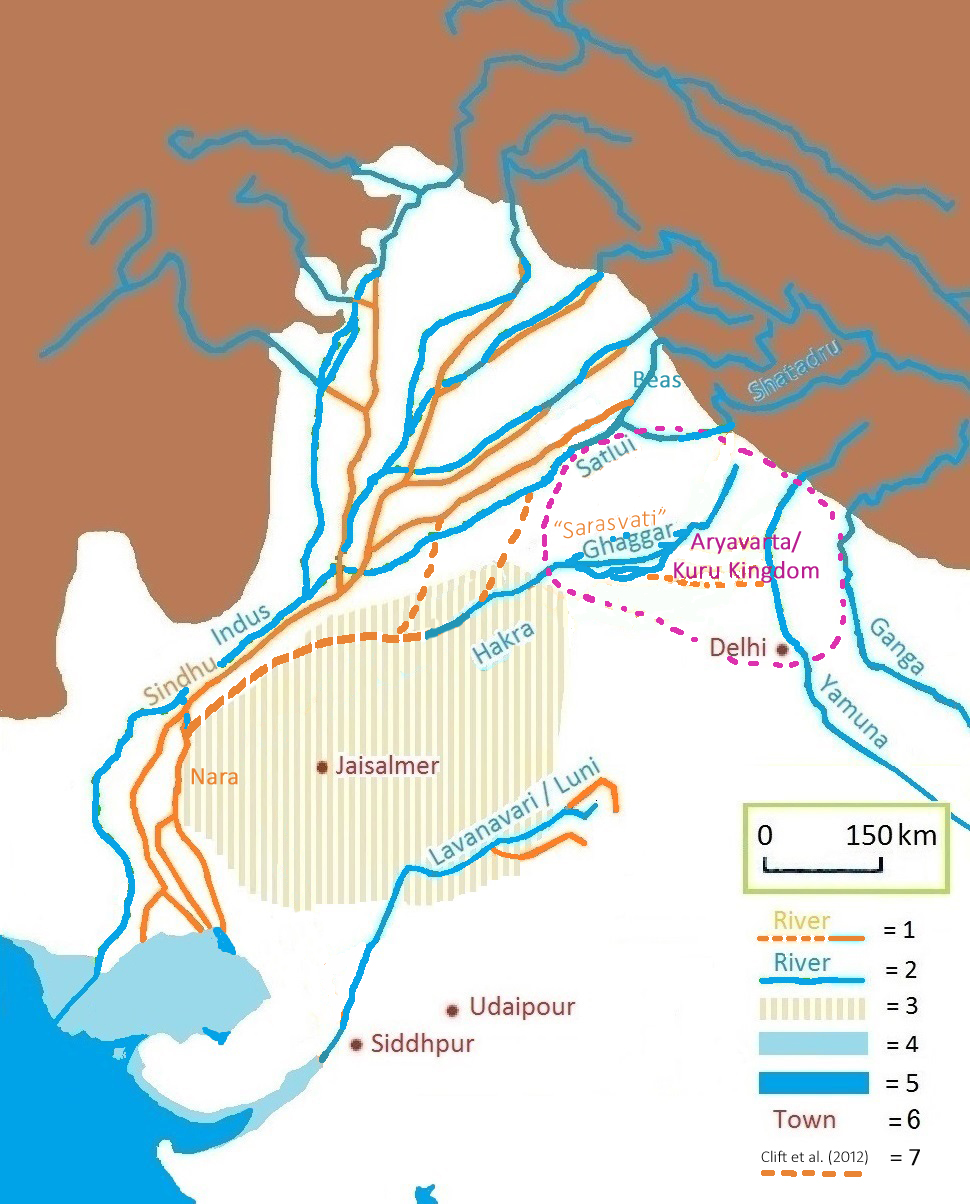
Vedic and present-day Gagghar-Hakra river-course, with Aryavarta/Kuru kingdom, and (pre-)Harappan Hakkra/Sutlej-Yamuna paleochannels. (Note: See Clift et al. (2012) map and Honde te al. (2017) map.) See also this satellite image. 1 = ancient river 2 = today's river 3 = today's Thar desert 4 = ancient shore 5 = today's shore 6 = today's town 7 = dried-up Harappan Hakkra course, and pre-Harappan Sutlej paleochannels.

Cemetery H, Late Harappan, OCP, Copper Hoard and Painted Grey ware sites.

== Location ==
Although the Drishadvati is mentioned several times in Sanskrit Granthas, a detailed description of the river is not found in other ancient literature and this has generated speculation about its source and route. The Latyayana Srautasutra (10.17) describes it as a seasonal river, with the Saraswati a perennial river until its vinasana (10.15-19).

The Drishadvati is mentioned in Brahmanas written primarily in the state of Brahmavarta. According to these texts, the river originated in the pot of Brahma: Pushkar Lake, near Ajmer. The Sarasvati, with four branches flowing in different directions, originated in the hills near Pushkar. Drishadvati was the branch flowing north. Most of the ashrams of the Rishis who compiled the Rigveda were on the river, between Pushkar and Dhosi Hill in Brahmavarta. According to the Rigveda, the Drishadvati was preferred for religious sacrifices by the Vedic people.

In the Manu Smriti, the Drishadvati and the Sarasvati define the boundaries of the Vedic state of Brahmavarta: "It says that the land, created by the Gods, which lies between the two divine rivers Sarasvati and Drishadvati, the (sages) call Brahmavarta." The text also says that although the Sarasvati formed the northern boundary of Kuru Pradesh, the Drishadvati flowed in south of Kuru Pradesh and north of Brahmavarta. According to the Mahabharata, the southern boundary of Kuru Pradesh was Guru Drona's ashram (present-day Gurgaon at one end and Rohtak and Jhajjar at the other); therefore, the Drishadvati flowed in the southern portions of these cities. Although about 100 streams flowed south to north in the 200-kilometre (120 mi)-wide Aravalli Range during the Vedic period, the only large river is the present-day Sahibi. The Sahibi has a lower flow at present because of low rainfall in its catchment area and has a wide, dry bed which carries water from the districts of Jaipur, Sikar, Alwar Rewari, Jhajjar, Rohtak and Delhi into the Yamuna.

The Drishadvati is mentioned in the Rigveda (RV 3.23.4) with the Sarasvati and Apaya. According to the Rigveda, the Brahmanas and the Kalpa, Vedic sacrifices were performed on this river and on the Sarasvati. In the Srimad Bhagavatam, the Drishadvati is a transcendental river.

== Origin ==
The Drishadvati was identified by Oldham as the Chautang River, and in 2000 Talageri identified it with the Hariyupiya and Yavyavati Rivers. In 1871 Alexander Cunningham identified the Rakshi River as the old Drishadvati and demonstrated its flow to have been from Chunar, near Varanasi. According to the Brahman Granthas, before its confluence with the Saraswati the Drishadvati flowed from the east to west. The Saraswati flowed from north to south during the Vedic period close to Aravallis, and the Drishadvati flowed from south to north through the Aravallis from Pushkar Lake in Rajasthan to Nangal Chaudhery in southern Haryana. The river then turned to reach Satnali and meet the Saraswati. After major tectonic/seismic activity in the Aravalli Range some 6500 years ago, the Saraswati changed its course.

According to Prabhat Ranjan Sarkar, the Drishadvati originated in the Vindya Mountains of Baghelkhand and joined the Charmanwati. After an earthquake, it flowed north to join the Son River. Sarkar believes that the Drishadvati is the Ghaghara.

== See also ==
- Ghaggar-Hakra River
