= Sarsuti =

Saraswati River
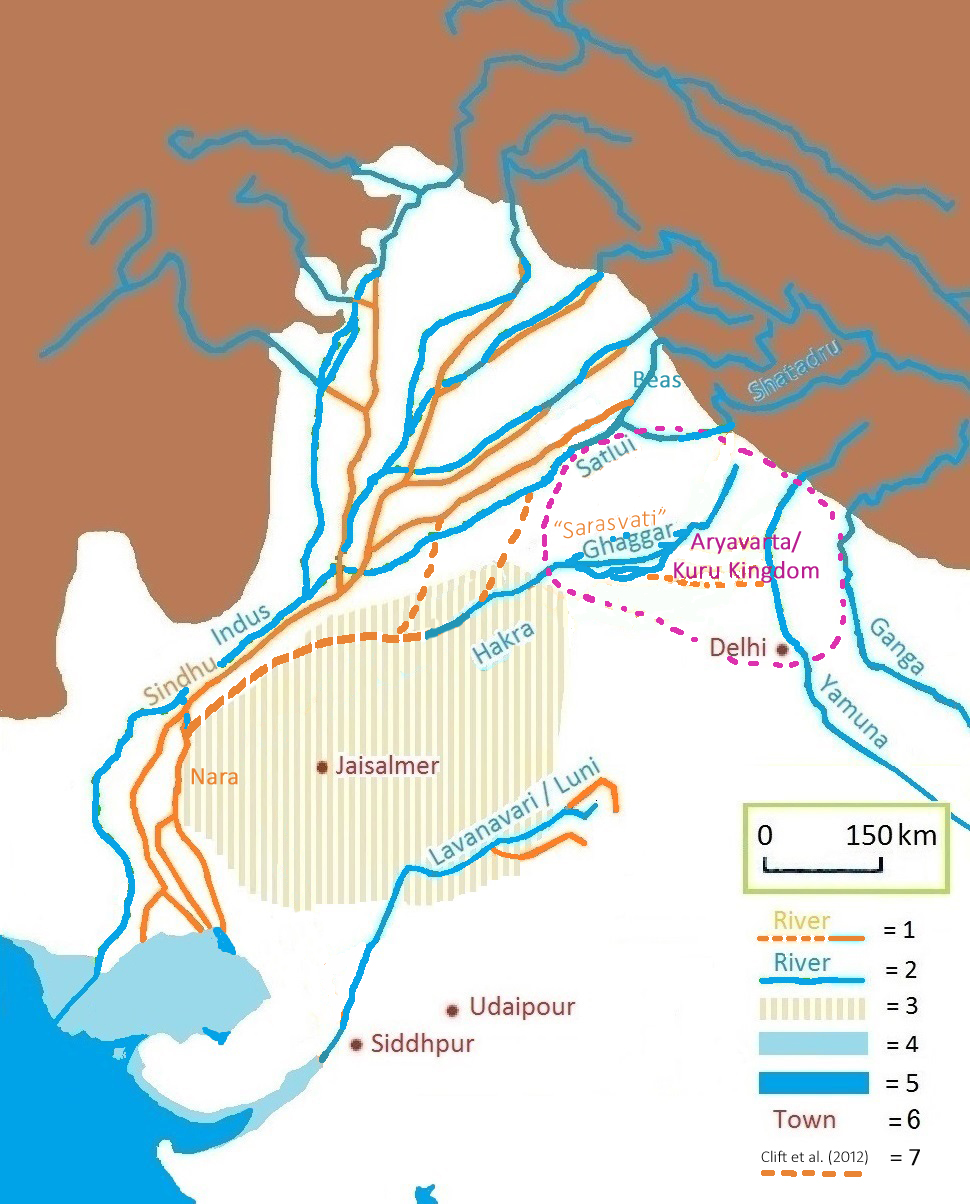
- The Saraswati river is part of the blue line upstream of the Ghaggar river.

Location
- Country: India

Physical characteristics
- Source
  - location: Rampur Herian (south of Adi Badri) Shivalik Hills, Haryana
- Discharge
  - location: Ghaggar river in Haryana

Basin features
- Tributaries
  - left: Markanda river and Dangri

The Sarsuti river, originating in Sivalik Hills and flowing through the palaeochannel of Yamuna, is a tributary of Ghaggar river in of Haryana state of India. Its course is dotted with archaeological and religious sites dating back to post-Harrapan Mahabharata sites from Vedic period, such as Kapal Mochan, Kurukshetra, Thanesar, Brahma Sarovar, Jyotisar, Bhor Saidan and Pehowa.

== Origin and route ==
The Sarsuti is a small ephemeral stream that rises in the Sivalik Hills of south-eastern Himachal Pradesh in India, and flows through Haryana. It is palaeochannel of Yamuna before Yamuna shifted towards east due to plate tectonics of Earth's crust. It has also been identified as one of the tributaries of Sarasvati River.

It flows south-east where it is joined by two other streams, the Markanda river and the Dangri, before joining the Ghaggar river near the village of Rasula [near Pehowa].

It is thereafter known as the Ghaggar. Further downstream on the banks of the Ghaggar stands an old derelict fort [at sirsa city] named Sarsuti.

According to Valdiya and Danino, Sarsuti is a corruption of the word Sarasvati, and the 6–8 km wide channel of the Sarsuti–Ghaggar system may have once been the Sarasvati River mentioned in the Rig Veda.

== See also ==
- Western Yamuna Canal, branches off Yamuna
- Markanda river, Haryana, a tributary of Sarsuti
- Dangri river, a tributary of Sarsuti
- Kaushalya river, a tributary of Ghaggar-Hakra River
- Chautang, a tributary of Ghaggar-Hakra River
- Sutlej, a tributary of Indus
- Ganges
- Indus
