= Dangri =

Coordinates: 30°13′N 76°43′E

Tangri River Dangri River
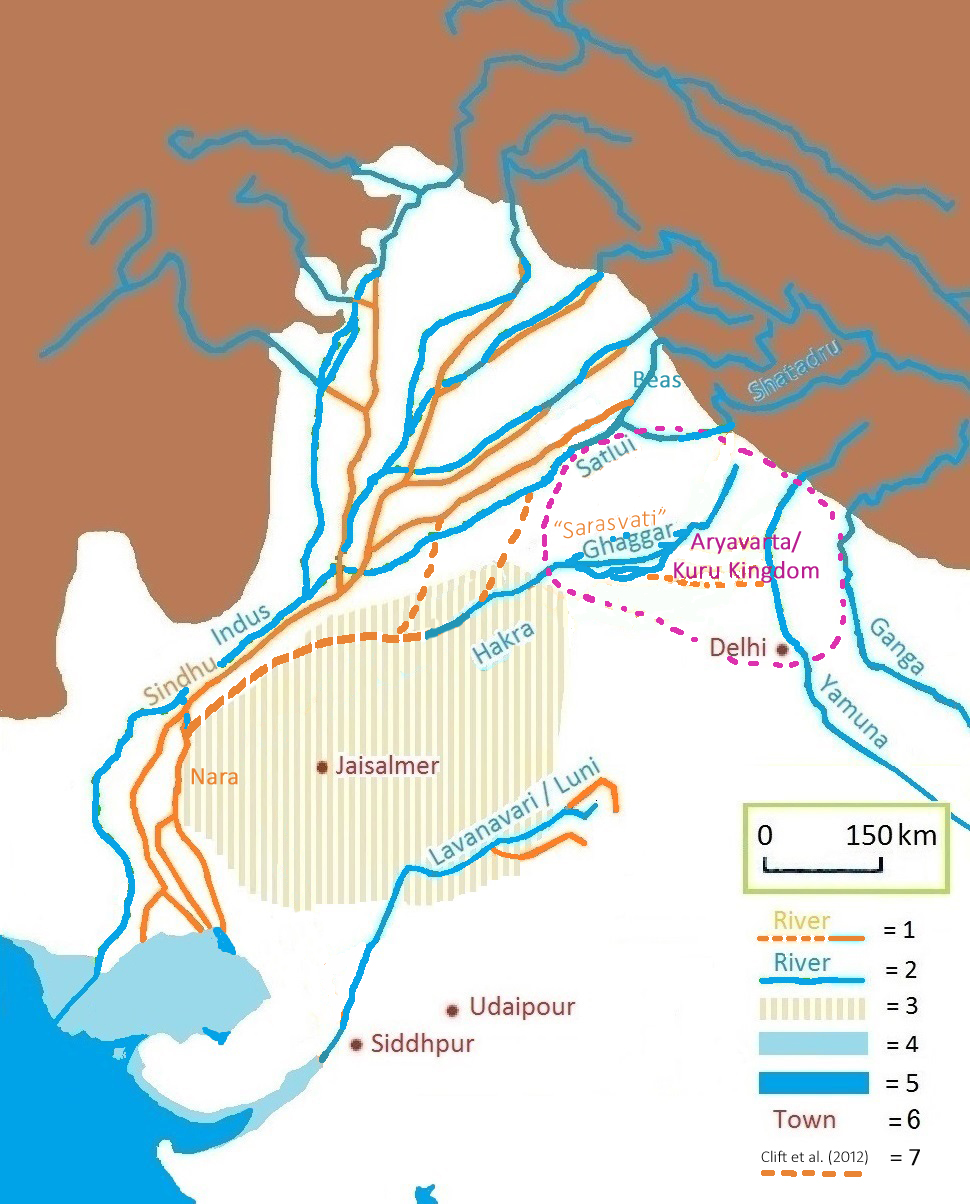
- Ghaggar-Hakra ("Sarasvati") rivers and tributaries

Location
- Country: India

Physical characteristics
- Source
  - location: Shivalik Hills, Himachal Pradesh
- Length: 70 km (43 mi)
- Discharge
  - location: Ghaggar River in Haryana

Basin features
- Cities: Ambala Cantt
- Tributaries
  - right: Balaiali River, Amri River (Dadri River or Shahzadpur Wali River)
- Bridges: Ambala cantt bridge, Barwala bridge, Ambala railway bridge

The Tangri River, also called the Dangri River, which originates in the Shivalik Hills, is a tributary of the Ghaggar River in the Haryana state of India.

== Origin and route ==
The Tangri River originates in the Shivalik hills on the border of Haryana and Himachal Pradesh states, and flows along the Haryana and Punjab border before meeting with the Ghaggar River. The basin is classified in two parts, Khadir and Bangar, the higher area that is not flooded in rainy season is called Bangar and the lower flood-prone area is called Khadar.

The Dangri or Tangri is a stream that rises in the Morni Hills of the Siwalik Hills of south-eastern Himachal Pradesh, and flows for 70 km in Haryana. It joins the Markanda River (Haryana) at the Haryana-Punjab border north of Sadhpur Viran in the northwest of the Kurukshetra district and south of Mehmudpur Rurki in south Patiala district. The combined Dangir-Markanda stream merges with the Sarsuti River in northeast Kaithal district, east of Diwana and southwest of Adoya, before joining the Ghaggar river just east of Dhandota village near Kasoli town in northwest Kaithal. It is thereafter known as the Ghaggar. Further downstream on the banks of the Ghaggar stands a derelict fort at Sirsa town named Sarsuti. After the Ottu barrage, the Ghaggar river is called the Hakra River and in Sindh it is called the Nara River. The order of rivers from left to right is the Ghaggar, Dangri, Markanda and Sarsuti. Further left to the right, the Chautang and Somb rivers are tributaries of the Yamuna.

It is believed that Sarsuti is a corruption of the word Sarasvati and that the 6–8 km wide channel of the Sarsuti–Ghaggar system might have once been the Sarasvati River mentioned in the Rig Veda. This Sarsuti channel is currently being revived by the Government of Haryana as the ancient Sarasvat river.

=== Tributaries ===
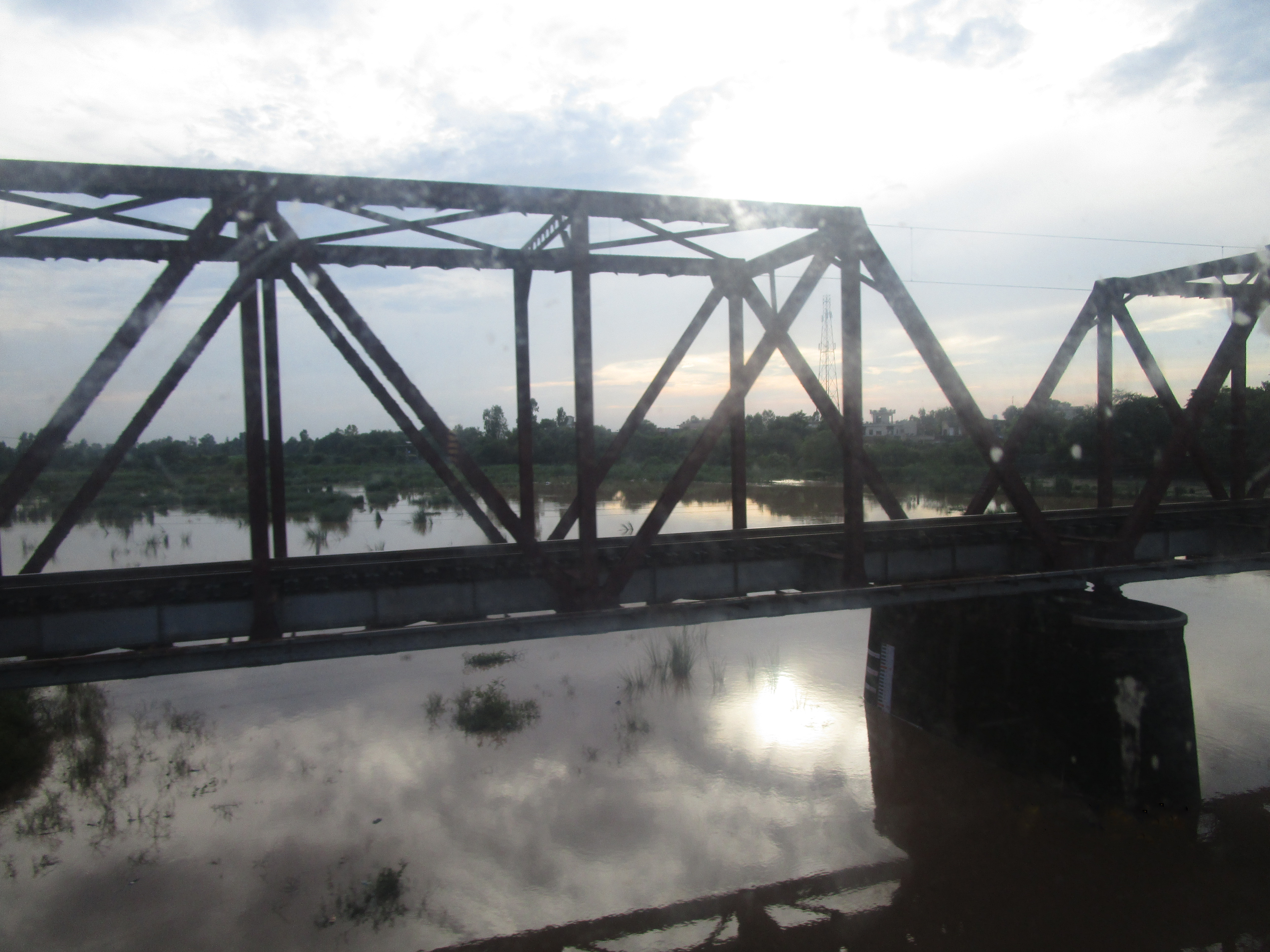
Tangri River at Ambala

Originating from the Morni Hills, the Tangri joins its southern tributary called the Balaiali River (which originates near the south of the Morni Hills) near Chajju Majra, south of Kharar. Near Panjokhra, southeast of Ambala, the Tangri River divides into two streams that flow north and south of Ambala. Further downstream near Segti and Segta villages, the Tangri River joins its tributary called the Amri River (also known as the Dadri River and the Shahzadpur Wali River, which originates near Rataur)) after Amri has already collected its own tributary called the Omla River.

- Ghaggar, 250 km
  - Kaushalya River, 20 km, tributary of the Ghaggar which converges in Panchkula
  - Markanda River, 90 km, eastern tributary of the Ghaggar
    - Dangri River (Tangri), 70 km, western tributary of the Markanda
      - Balaiali River, eastern tributary of the Dangri
      - Amri River (Dadri River or Shahzadpur Wali river), eastern tributary of the Dangri
        - Omla River, tributary of the Amri River
      - Numerous other streams in Yamunanagar district
  - Sarsuti, ? km, eastern tributary of the Ghaggar
  - Chautang, 9 km, eastern tributary of the Ghaggar

Several archaeologists have identified the old Ghaggar-Hakra River with the Sarasvati River, on the banks of which the Indus Valley Civilisation developed.

== Gallery ==
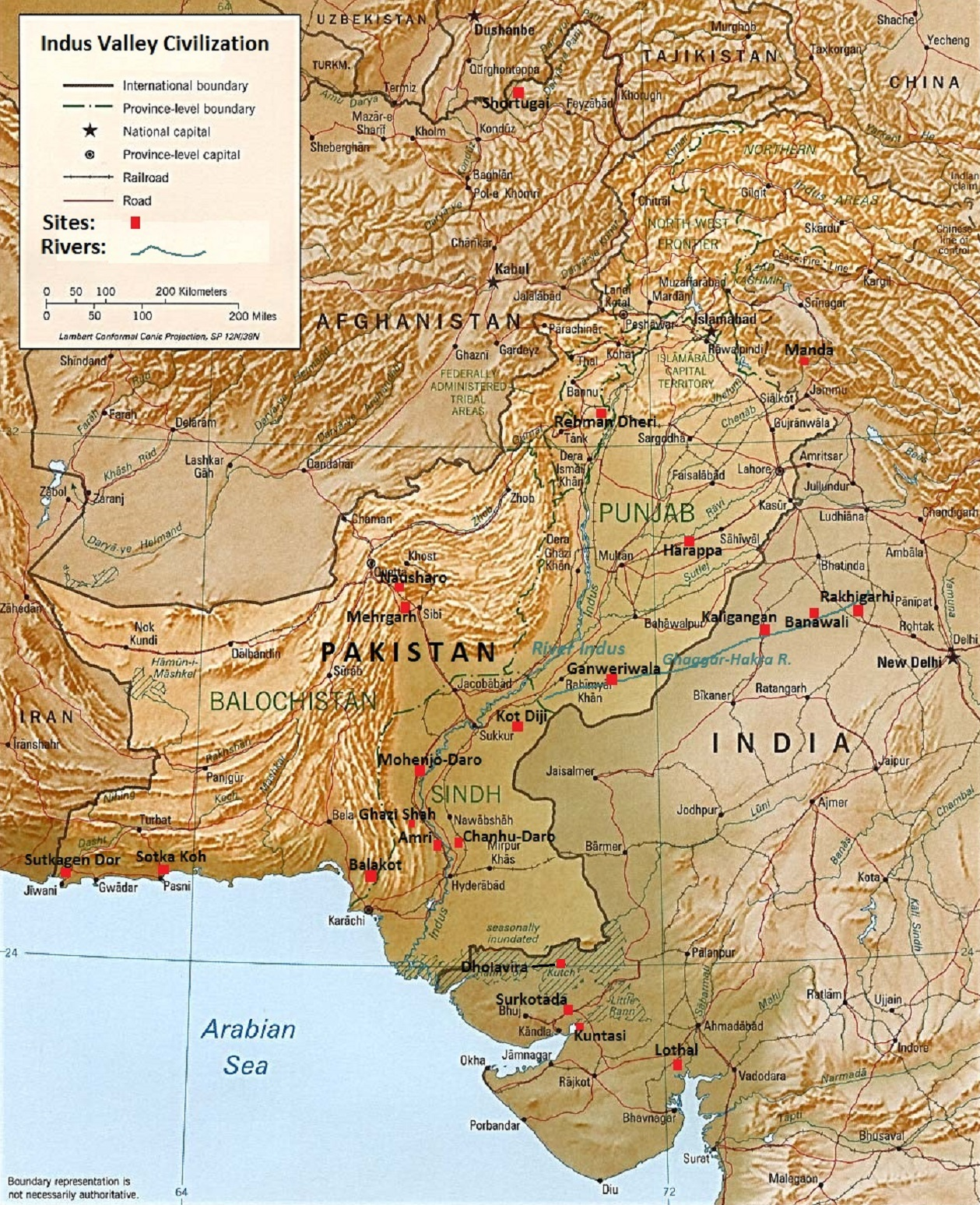
Indus–Sarasvati civilisation major sites

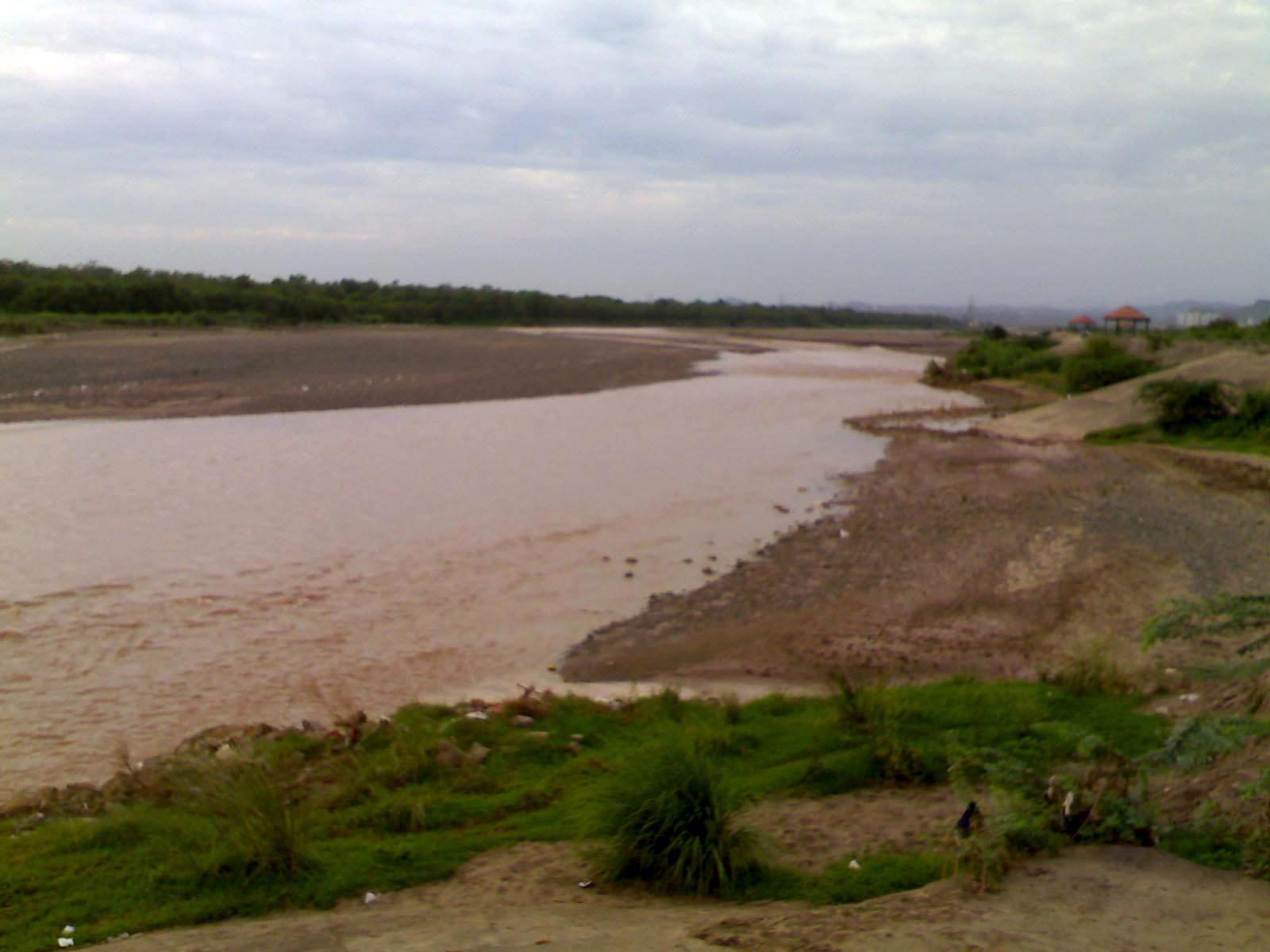
Ghaggar River flowing through Panchkula in Haryana

== See also ==
- Western Yamuna Canal, branches off Yamuna
- Yamuna, a current left-side tributary of the Ganges and an earlier right-side tributary of Sarasvati River
- Sutlej, a current right-side tributary of Indus and an earlier left side tributary of Sarasvati River
- Ganges
- Indus
