= Chautang =

Chautang River
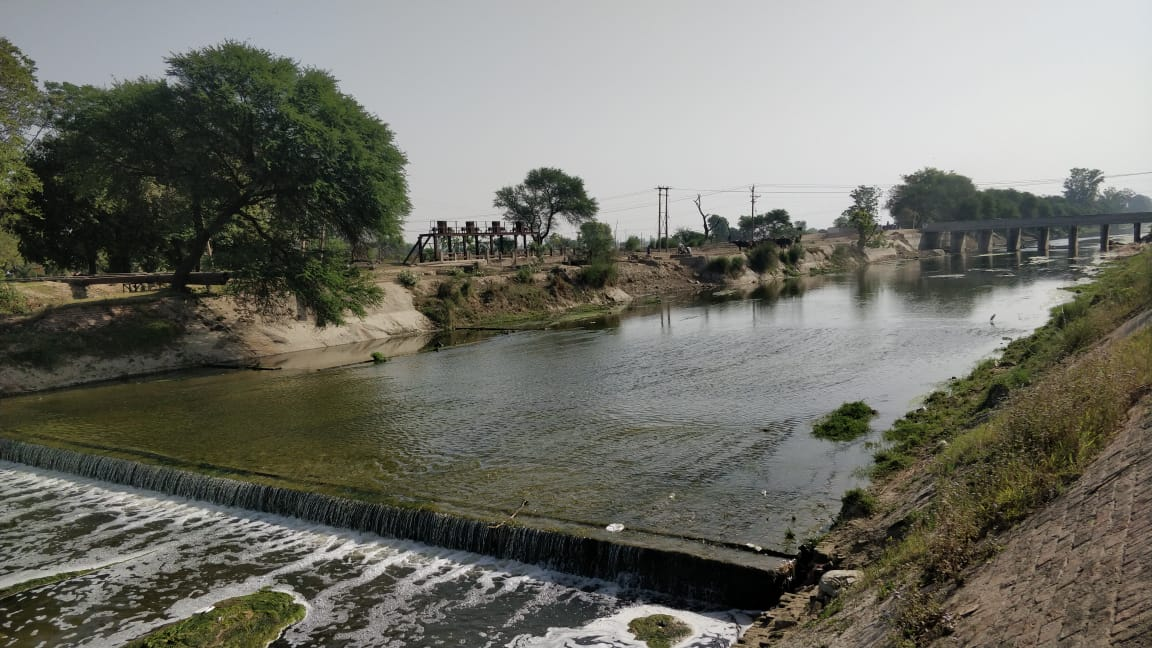

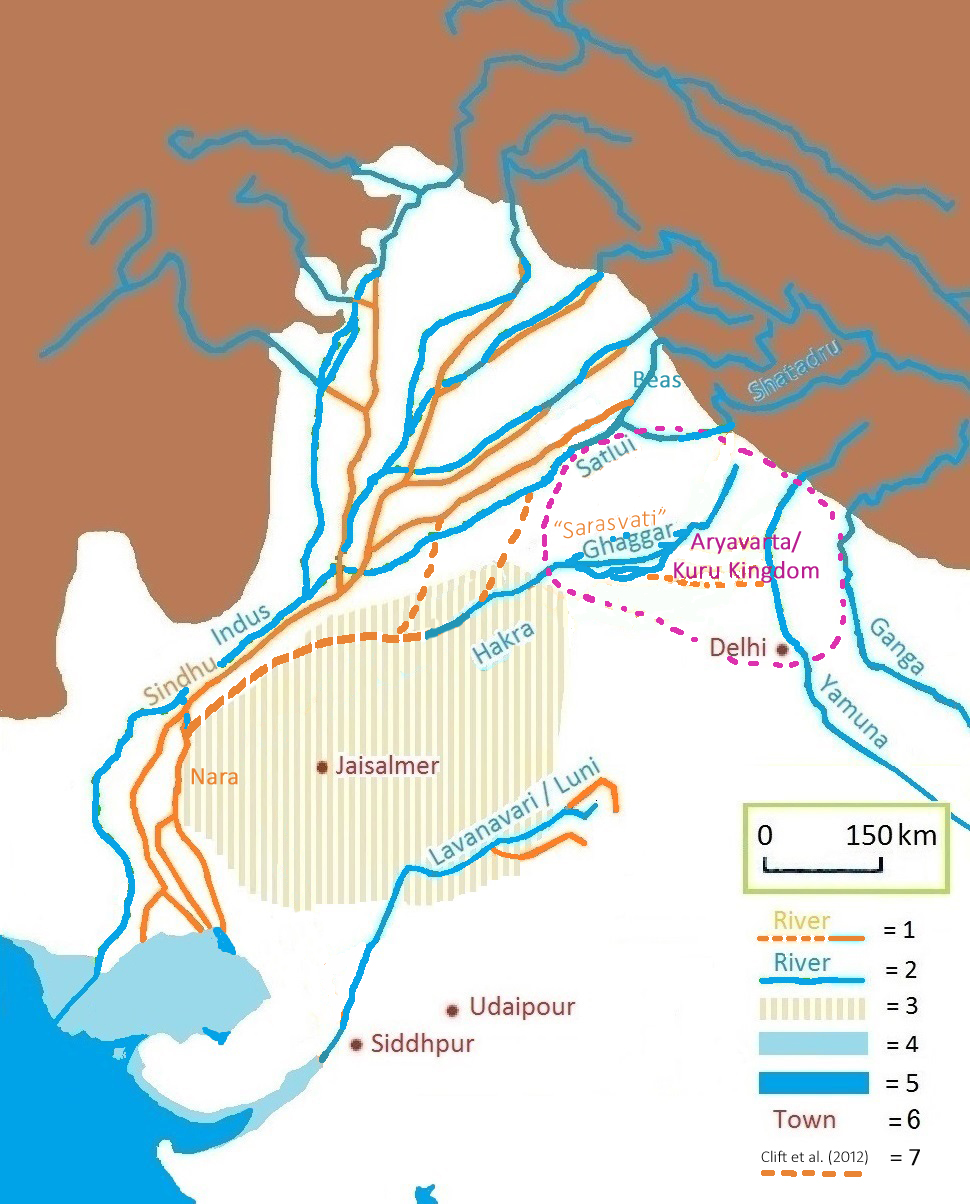
- Ghaggar-Hakra ("Sarasvati") rivers and tributaries

Location
- Country: India

Physical characteristics
- Source
  - location: Shivalik Hills, Himachal Pradesh
- Discharge
  - location: Ghaggar River in Haryana

The Chautang is a seasonal river, originating in the Sivalik Hills, in the Indian state of Haryana. The Chautang River is a tributary of the Sarsuti River which in turn is a tributary of the Ghaggar River.

== Origin and route ==
The Chautang River is a seasonal river in the state of Haryana, India. It is theorized by some to be a remnant of the ancient river Drishadvati. It joins the Ghaggar-Hakra River east of Suratgarh in Rajasthan. According to McIntosh, this river was one of the main contributors to this river system until the Yamuna changed its course. However, according to Giosan, the Chautang is a rain-fed river, and the Yamuna changed its course towards east some 50,000 to 10,000 years ago, and didn't pour any water into it for the last 10,000 years. Hansi Branch of Western Yamuna Canal is palaeochannel of this river.

Firuz Tughluq ( A.D. 1351-1388) rejuvenated the canal from the Yamuna which entered the district at Anta (tahsil Safidon) and thence flowing through the present Jind District from east to west in the line of the old Chautang river passing the town of Safidon, Dhatrath and Jind and reached Hisar. This branch was built in the paleochannel of seasonal Chautang River which is a relict of Drishadvati River flowing from Kaithal to Hisar district, passing through the towns of Jind, Hansi, Hisar, largest Indus Valley Civilization site of Rakhigarhi and ancient Agroha Mound. Drishadvati 4iver itself was a tributary of the Ghaggar-Hakra River.

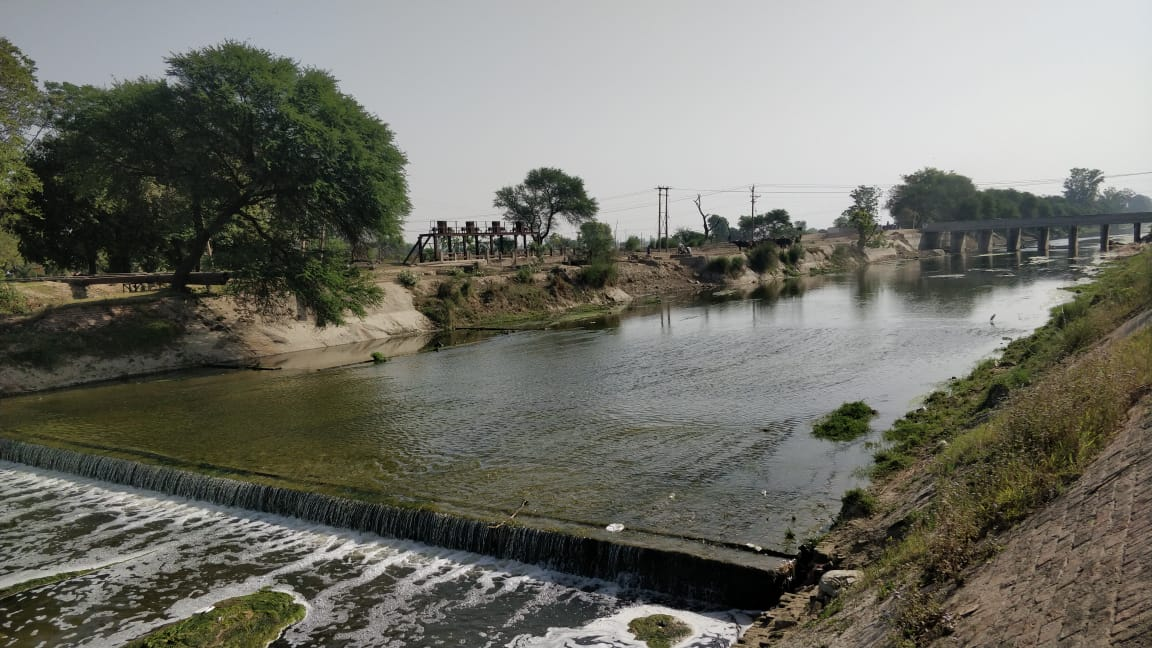
In a picture taken near Dhatrath, the old Chautang River which has been converted into Jind Hansi branch. This branches away from Western Yamuna Canal near Munak

=== Tributaries ===
Rakshi River, a non-perennial monsoon season tributary of Chautang, originates from Shivalik Hills at Shahpur village in the Yamunanagar district, flows 32 km south and joins Chautang river near Ladwa in the Kurukshetra district. The Haryana government has rejuvenated the river by diverting water from the Chetang nullah from Bubka head into Rakshi river replenishing the groundwater levels in 50 villages in the Yamunanagar, Kurukshetra, and Karnal districts. The rejuvenation of the Rakshi River is part of a larger plan by the Haryana Sarasvati Heritage Development Board (HSHDB) to revive other rivers in the state, including the Somb River, Chautang, Tangri, Markanda, and Ghaggar.

== See also ==
- Western Yamuna Canal, branches off Yamuna River
- Markanda River, a tributary of Sarsuti
- Dangri, a tributary of Sarsuti
- Sarsuti, a tributary of Ghaggar-Hakra River
- Kaushalya River, a tributary of Ghaggar-Hakra River
- Sutlej, a tributary of Indus
- Ganges
- Indus
