= Basai Wetland =

- Wetland
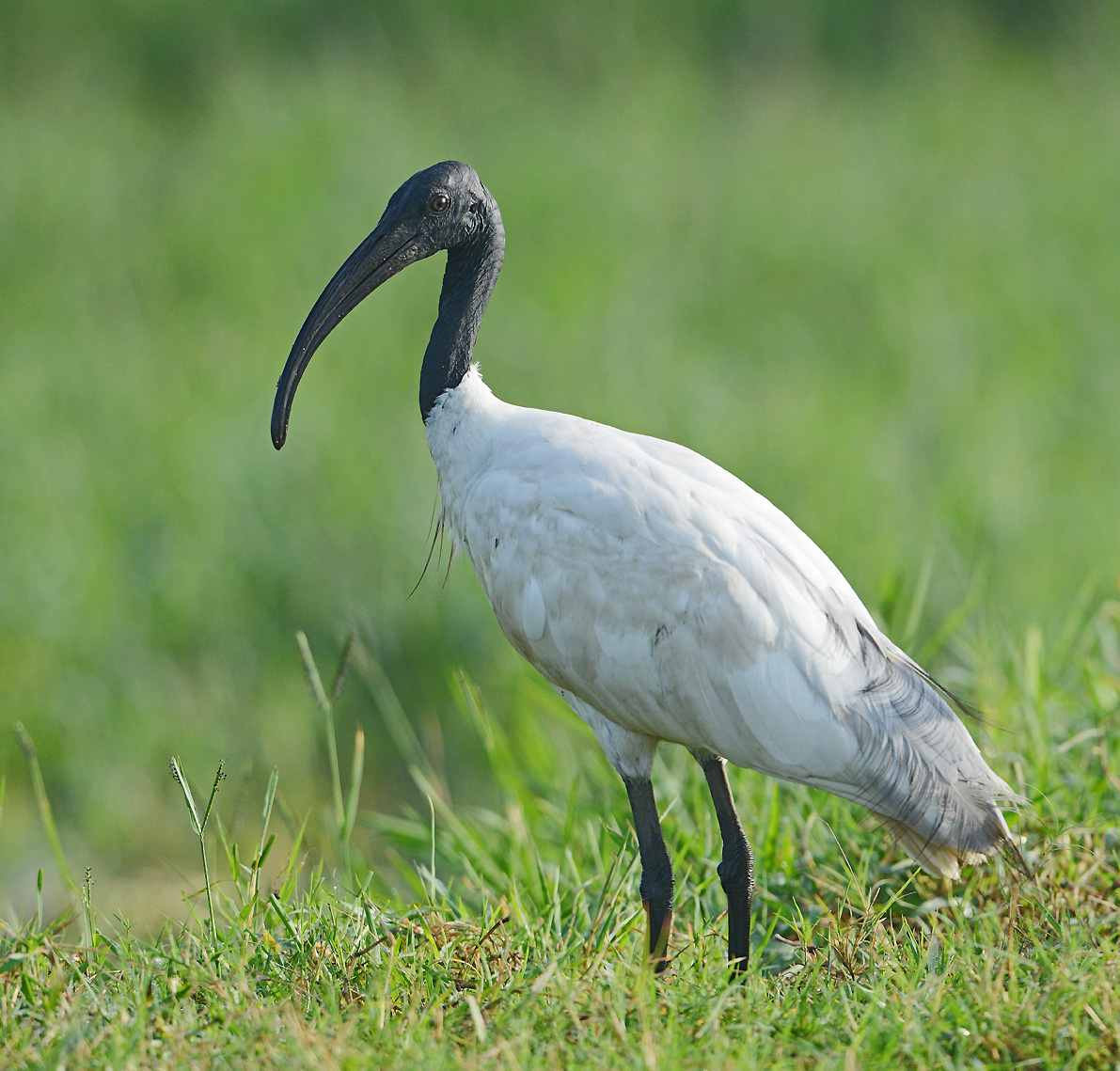

- Location in Haryana, India Basai Wetland (India)
- Coordinates: 28.461259°N 76.98437°E
- Country: India
- State: Haryana
- Region: North India
- District: Gurgaon
- Time zone: UTC+5:30 (IST)
- PIN: 122002
- ISO 3166 code: IN-HR
- Website: www.haryanaforest.gov.in

Basai Wetland, located in Basai village in Gurgaon tehsil in Gurgaon district in Haryana, India, is a flora and fauna rich water body. It is recognised as one of India's Important Bird and Biodiversity Areas and is of global conservation significance as it supports populations of several endangered, vulnerable, and threatened bird species. Basai wetlandis recognised globally as an Important Bird Area (IBA) by the BirdLife International housing 20,000 birds of over 280 species including migratory birds and endangered birds, has not yet been declared a protected wetland by the Government of Haryana.

== Location and importance ==
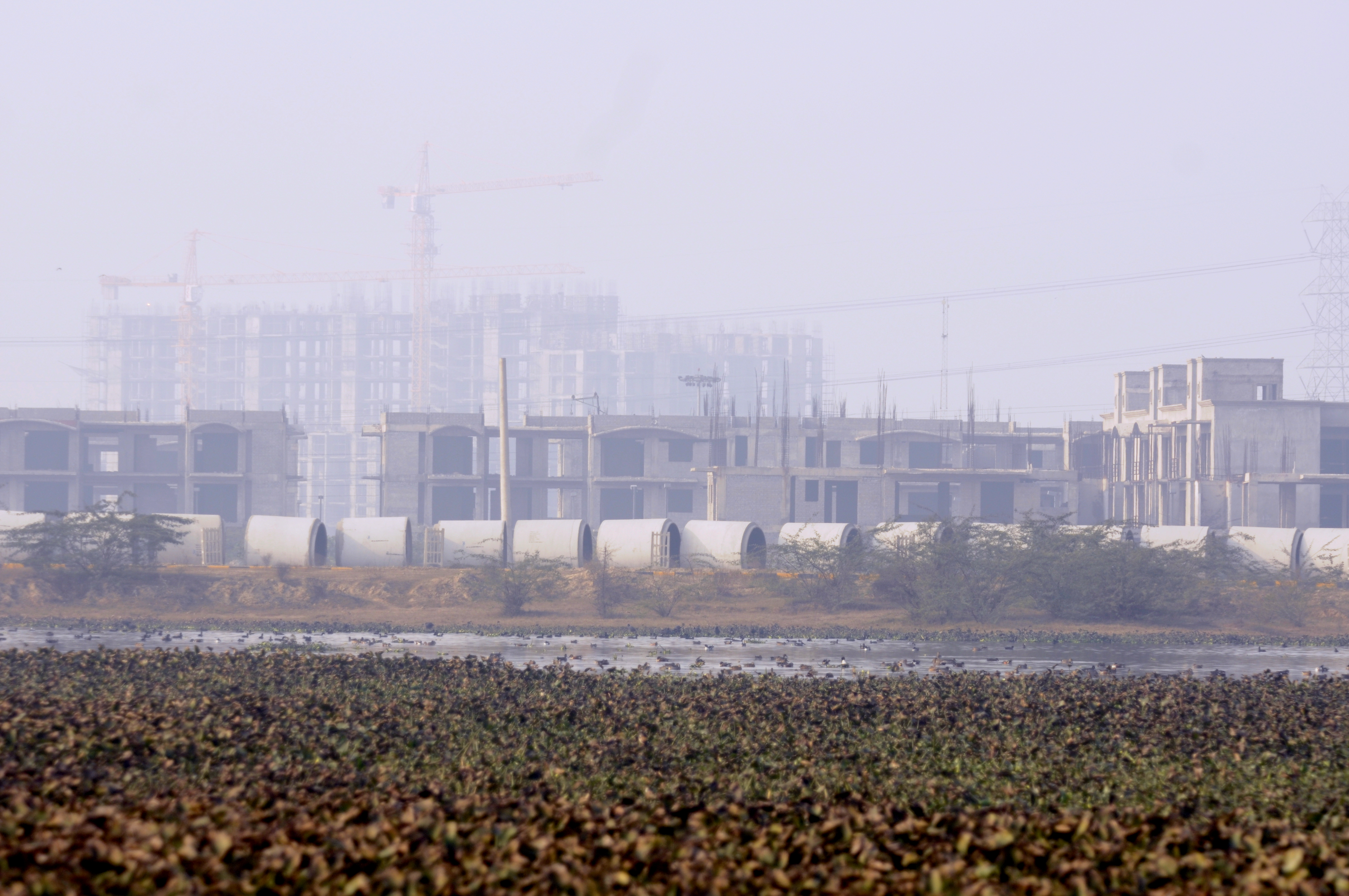
Basai Wetland with water hyacinth, open water with ducks, and urban areas behind

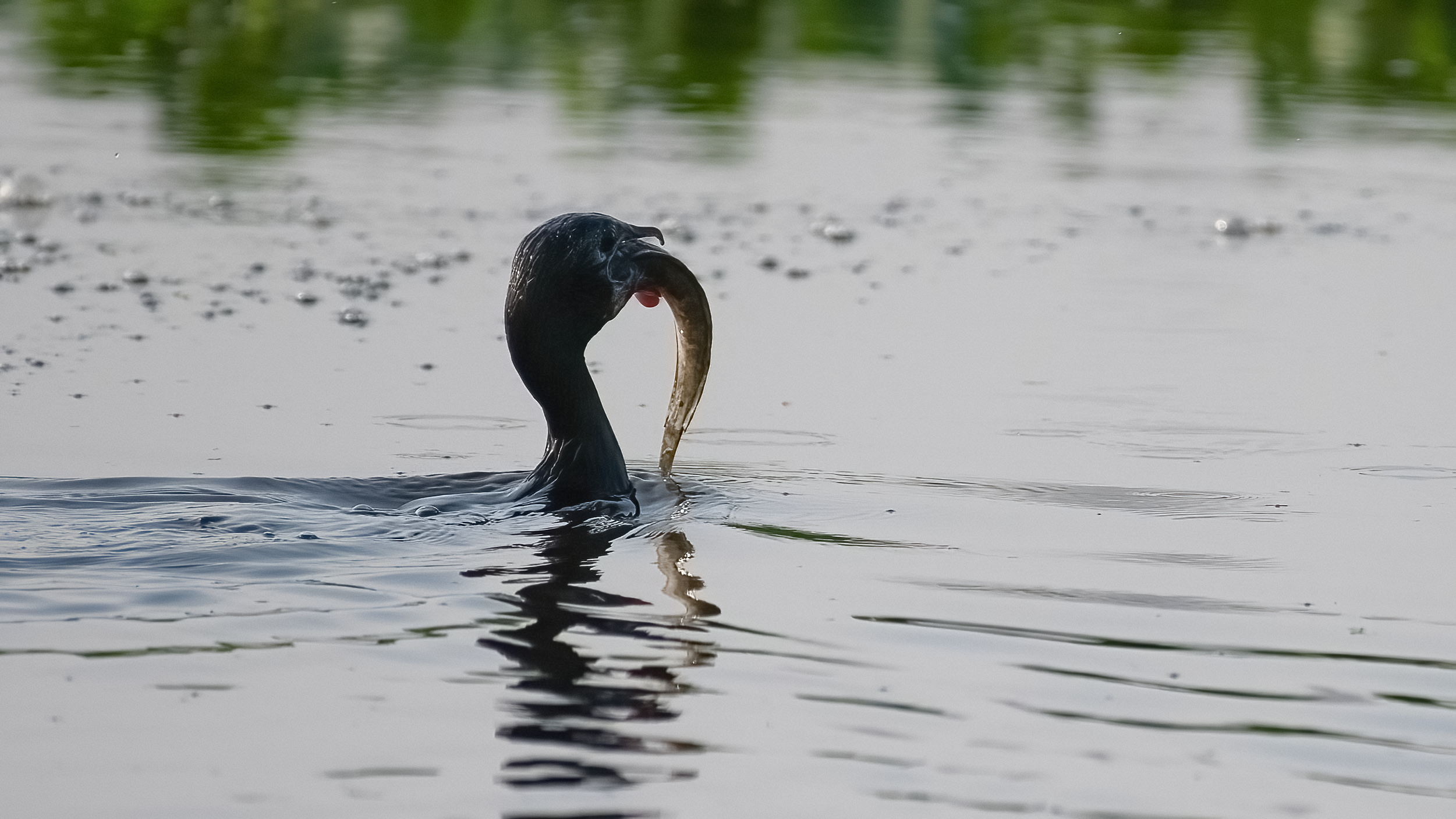

Basai Wetland is located less than 40 kilometres (25 mi) away from the national capital, New Delhi, about 2 kilometres (1.2 mi) from Gurgaon city in Gurgaon district of Haryana State. It is 282 kilometres (175 mi) from the state capital Chandigarh. It is located 8 km away from Sultanpur National Park in Haryana.

Basai wetland lies in one of the paleochannel of the Sahibi River, a tributary of Yamuna which originates from the Aravalli Range in Rajasthan and flows through west and South Haryana into Delhi where it is also known as the Najafgarh drain. Basai wetland is one of the several wetlands that lie in series along the paleochannel and the current course of the Sahibi river, including the Masani barrage wetland, Matanhail forest, Chhuchhakwas-Godhari, Khaparwas Wildlife Sanctuary, Bhindawas Wildlife Sanctuary, Outfall Drain Number 6 (canalised portion in Haryana of Sahibii river), Outfall Drain Number 8 (canalised portion in Haryana of Dohan River which is a tributary of Sahibi River), Sarbashirpur, Sultanpur National Park, Basai wetland, Najafgarh lake and Najafgarh drain bird sanctuary, Ghata lake, Badshahpur lake, Khandsa lake and The Lost lake of Gurugram. All of these are home to endangered and migratory birds. Most of these largely remain unprotected. These are under extreme threat mainly from the colonisers and builders.

Geologically, the wetland is situated on a paleochannel of the Sahibi River. It serves as a vital ecological link in a chain of North Indian wetlands that includes the Masani barrage and the Bhindawas Wildlife Sanctuary.

== Wetland ==
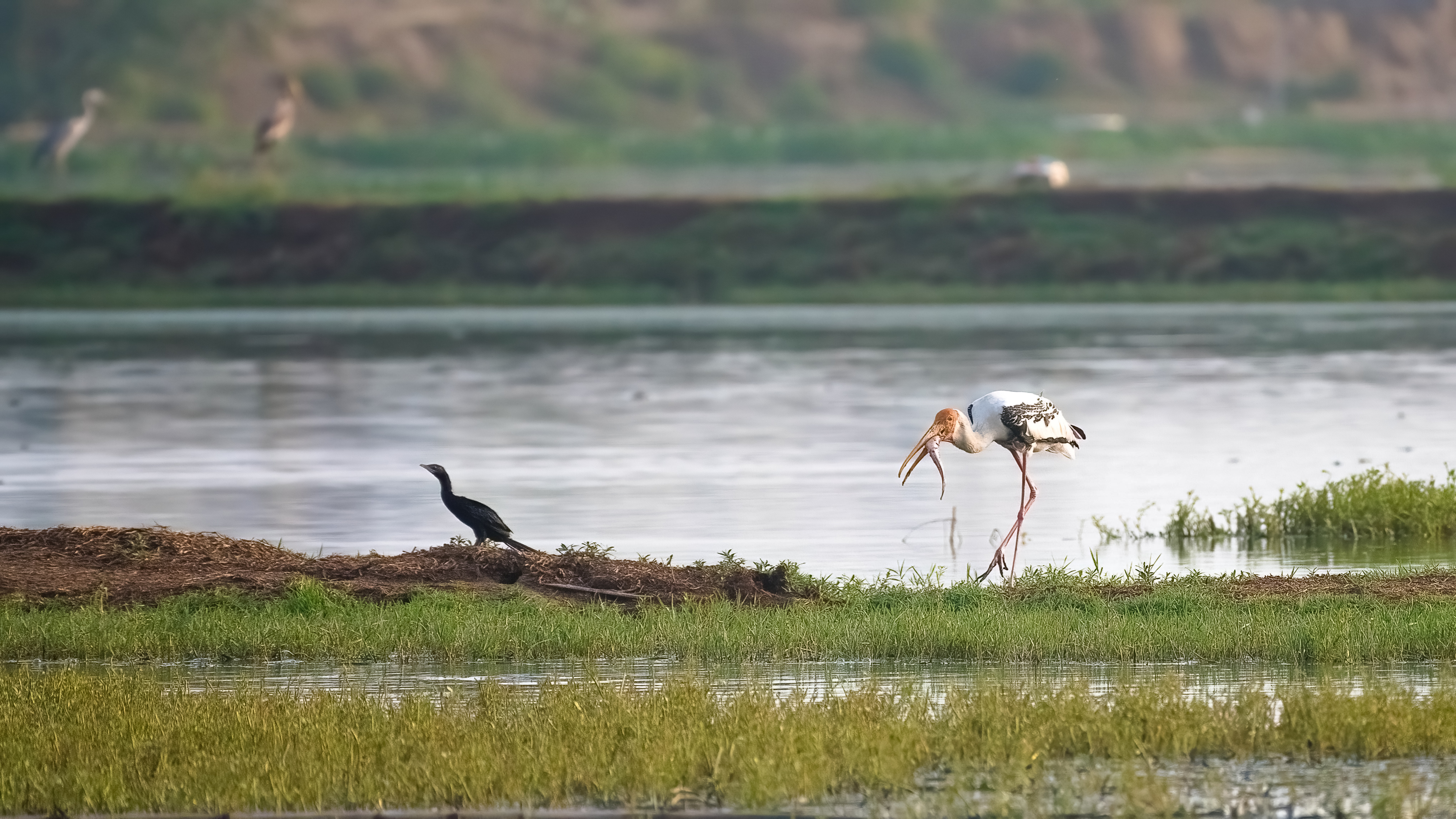
The whole wetland is now getting encroached with human civilization causing a big threat to the wetland

The wetland is permanent shallow wetland covering an area of about 250 acres. It includes areas with open water, Water Hyacinth Eichhornia crassipes, Typha reedbeds, fields of Paspalum grass, and adjoining fallow fields, seasonally cultivated lands, and some thorn scrub vegetation with Salicornia and Acacia. Crops such as rice, wheat, pearl-millet, sorghum, and mustard are cultivated seasonally in the agricultural land. The wetland is inundated to an area of about 1 square kilometre during the monsoon by rain water and water channeled by farmers to irrigate crops. A major source of water is also a breached water channel carrying waste water and treated sewage from the Gurgaon Water and Sewage Works.

== Bird life ==
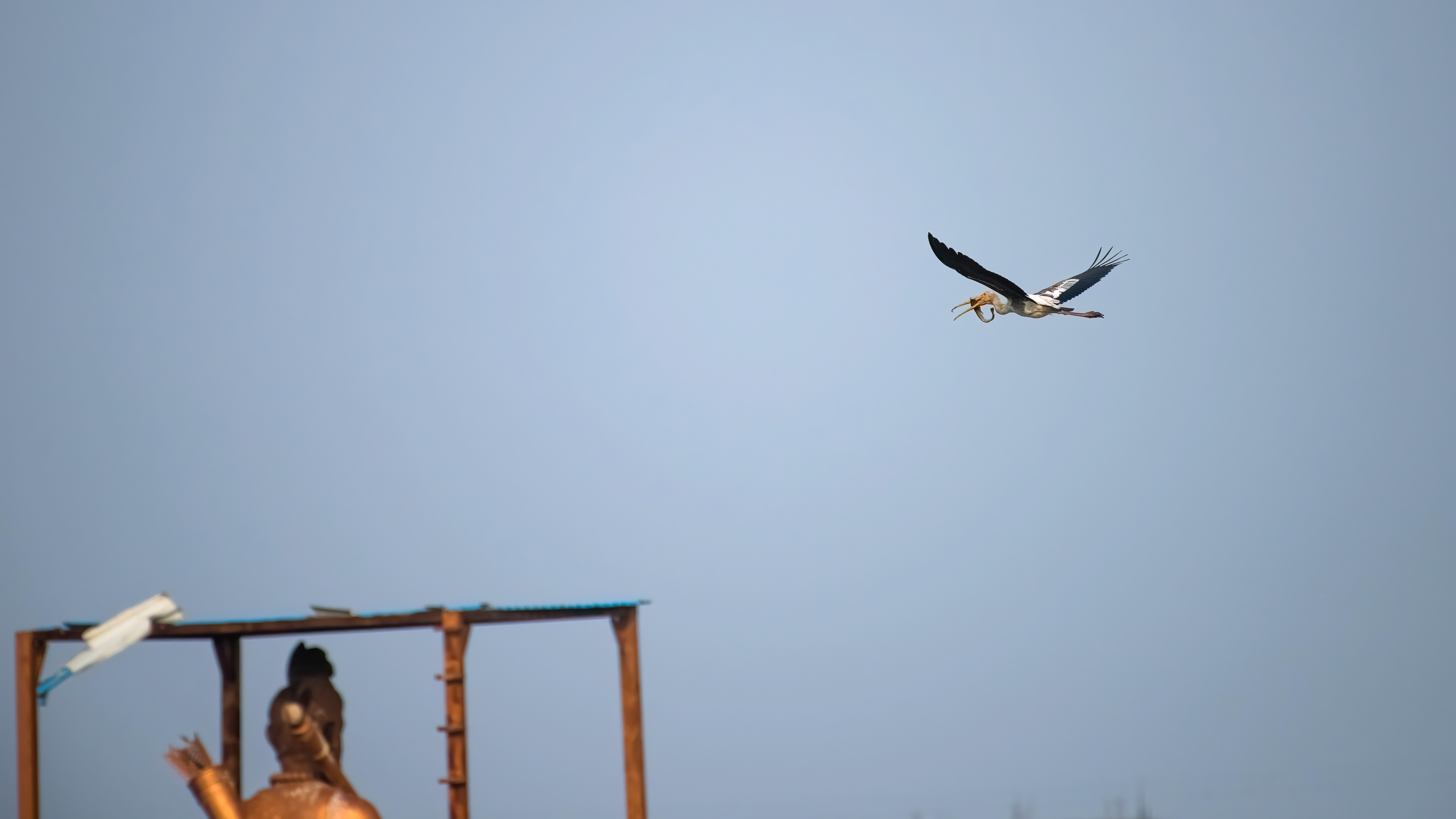
The birds at Basia are very insecure and forced to take their prey to other safer areas.

The site is classified as an Important Bird Area (IBA) by BirdLife International, specifically meeting criteria A1 (supporting globally threatened species), A4i (hosting 1% or more of the biogeographical population of a species), and A4iii (regularly supporting over 20,000 waterbirds).The wetland supports a high diversity of birds, with at least 239 species reported since 2001 in the area recognised as an Important Bird and Biodiversity Area. The wetland is also recognised as a birding hotspot in eBird with 282 bird species recorded as of May 2017.

According to a recent assessment, Basai Wetland meets three Important Bird and Biodiversity Areas (IBA) criteria: containing populations of threatened species (Criterion A1), supporting more than 1% of biogeographical population of a species (Criterion A4i), and supporting populations of more than 20,000 waterbirds (Criterion A4iii). Though the wetland shrinks during the summer months, it has a large number of resident bird species, including many typical of wetlands, some of which breed in the hundreds occur in Basai Wetland, including Grey-headed swamphen, Cattle egret, Black bittern, Cinnamon bittern, Yellow bittern, and Yellow-bellied Prinia. The wetland is also used by birds such as Grey-headed Lapwing, Watercock, and Greater flamingo. Two critically endangered vulture species were reported to occur in Basai Wetland in the past: White-rumped vulture and Red-headed vulture.

Basai wetland also provides an important habitat for migratory birds. In winter when the wetland expands after monsoon rains, around 1100 Bar-headed Goose have been reported, while up to 5,000 ducks of 18 species and 10,000 waders of 36 species occur during spring and autumn passage migration. Among the many migrant bird species found here over the winter are Wood sandpiper, Smoky warbler, Moustached warbler, Common grasshopper warbler, Water rail, Baillon's crake, Great bittern, Water Pipit, and Common crane. During winter, several thousand Citrine wagtail and Yellow wagtail are also known to roost in Basai Wetland.

The bird life of Basai Wetland includes the following species of conservation concern as per the IUCN Red List of Threatened Species:

IUCN Redlist Status
Critically Endangered (CR)	Endangered (EN)	Vulnerable (VU)	Near-Threatened (NT)
White-rumped vulture	Egyptian vulture	Greater spotted eagle	Alexandrine parakeet
Red-headed vulture	Steppe eagle	Eastern imperial eagle	Asian dowitcher
	Black-bellied tern	Indian spotted eagle	Black-headed ibis
		Sarus crane	Black-necked stork
		Marbled duck	Black-tailed godwit
		Common pochard	Curlew sandpiper
		Woolly-necked stork	Eurasian curlew
			European roller
			Ferruginous duck
			Lesser flamingo
			Northern lapwing
			Oriental darter
			Painted stork
			Pallid harrier
			Red-necked falcon
			River lapwing
			River tern

== Other animals ==
Among the mammals, Nilgai, Golden jackal, Jungle cat, and Indian grey mongoose are known to occur. Reptiles known from Basai Wetland include Bengal monitor, Rat snake, Checkered keelback, and water snakes. A large population of amphibians also occurs in the swampy habitat. This also lies in the range of the leopard of the aravalli hills.

== Gallery ==
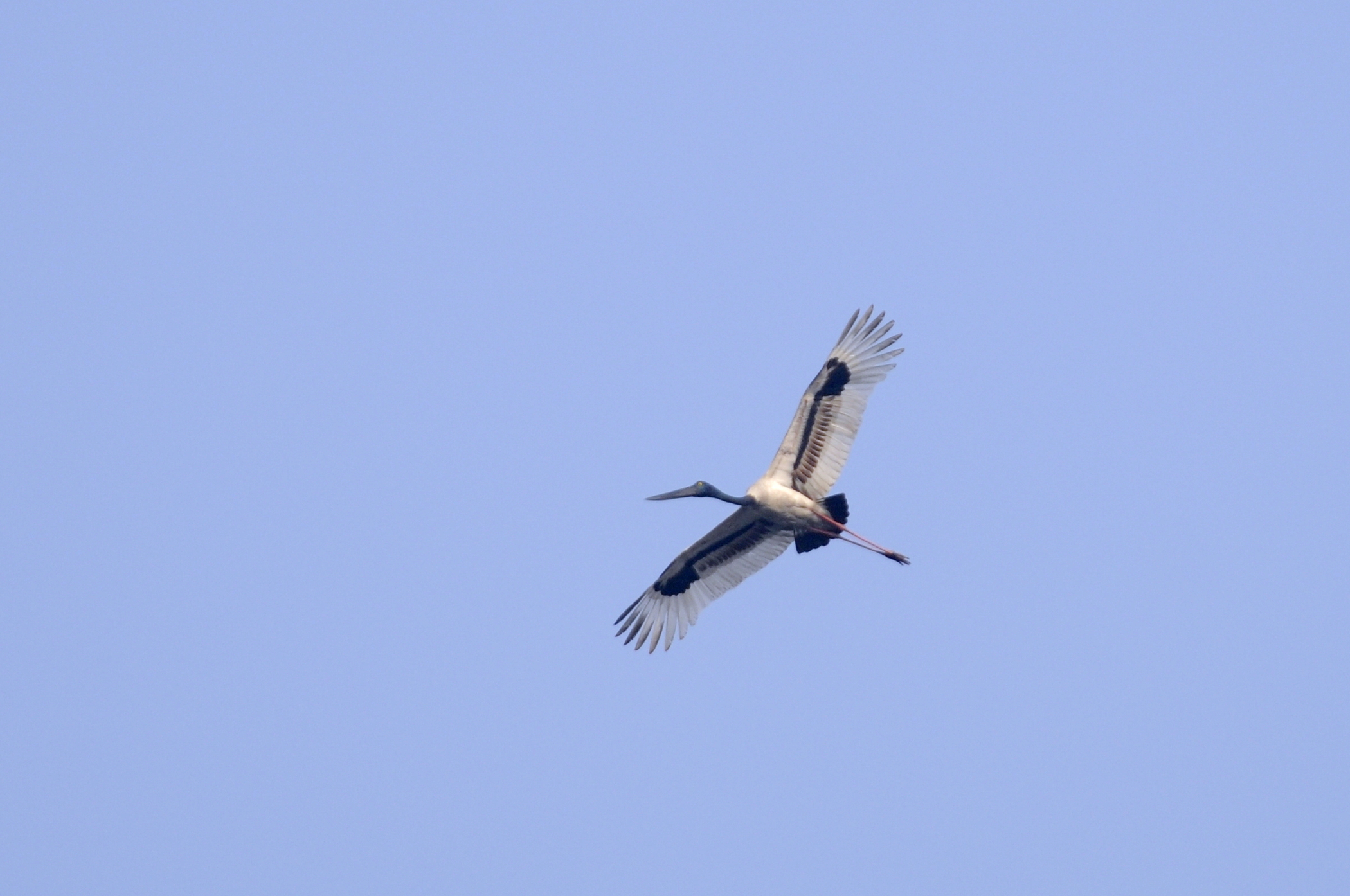
Black-necked Stork in Basai Wetland

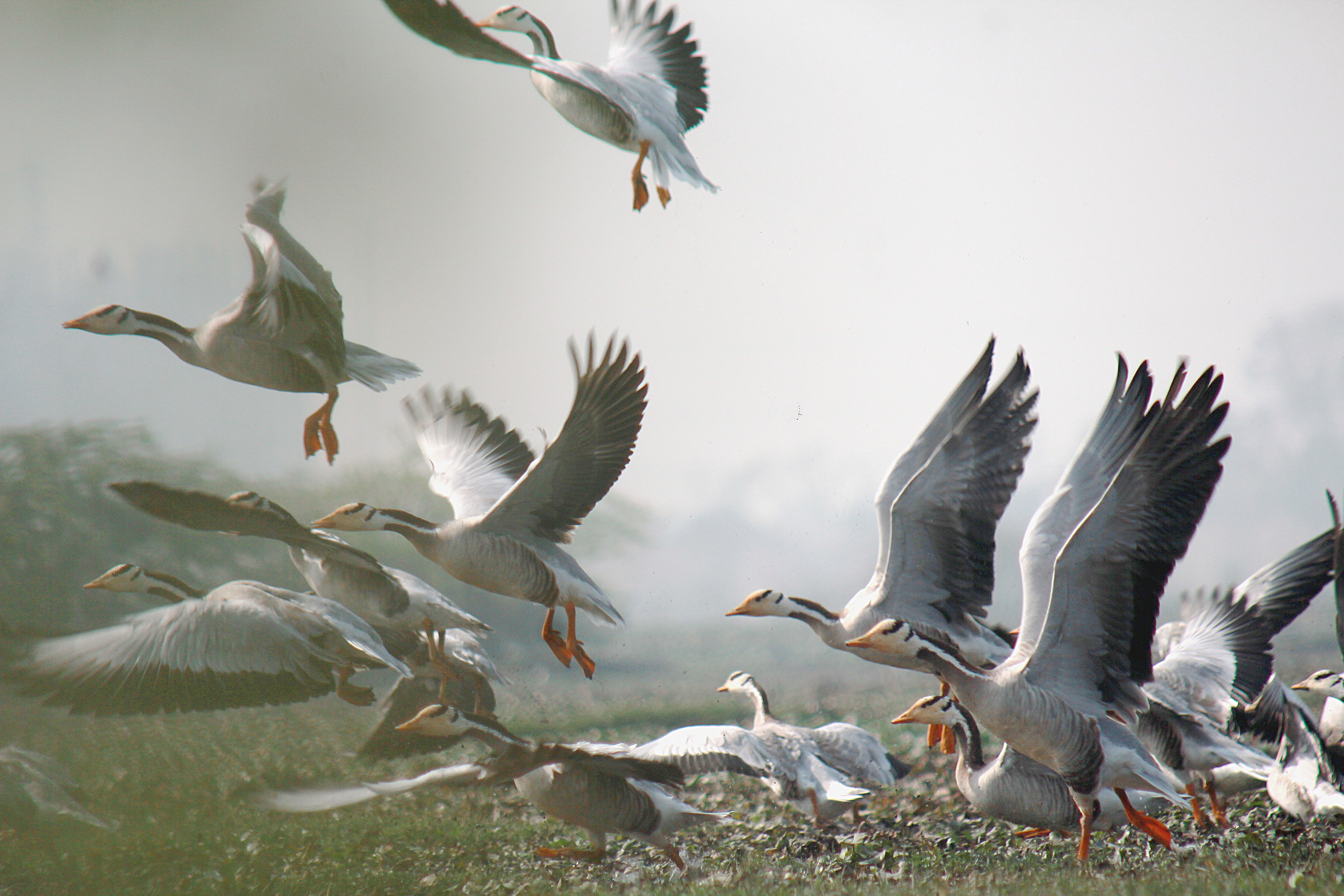
Bar-headed Goose in Basai Wetland

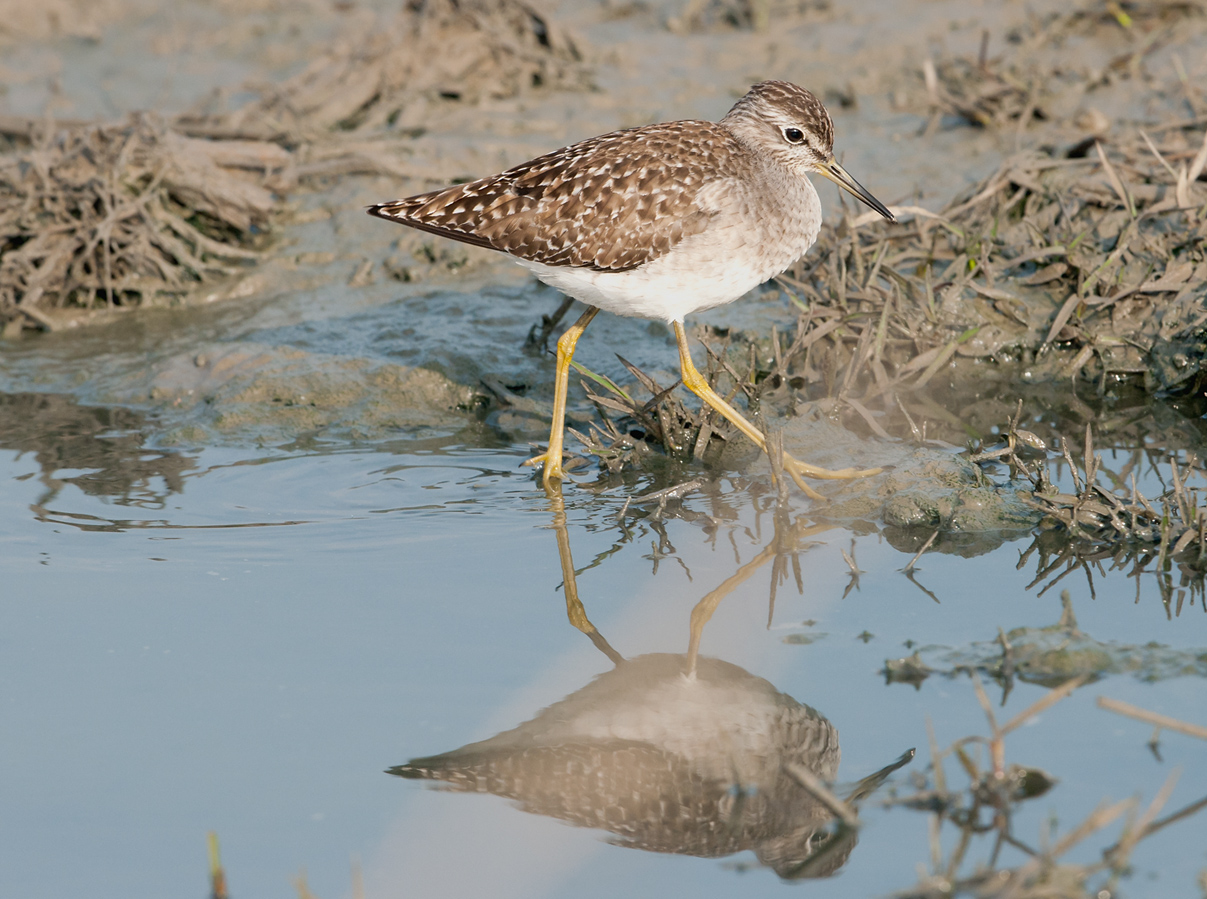
Tringa glareola at Basai

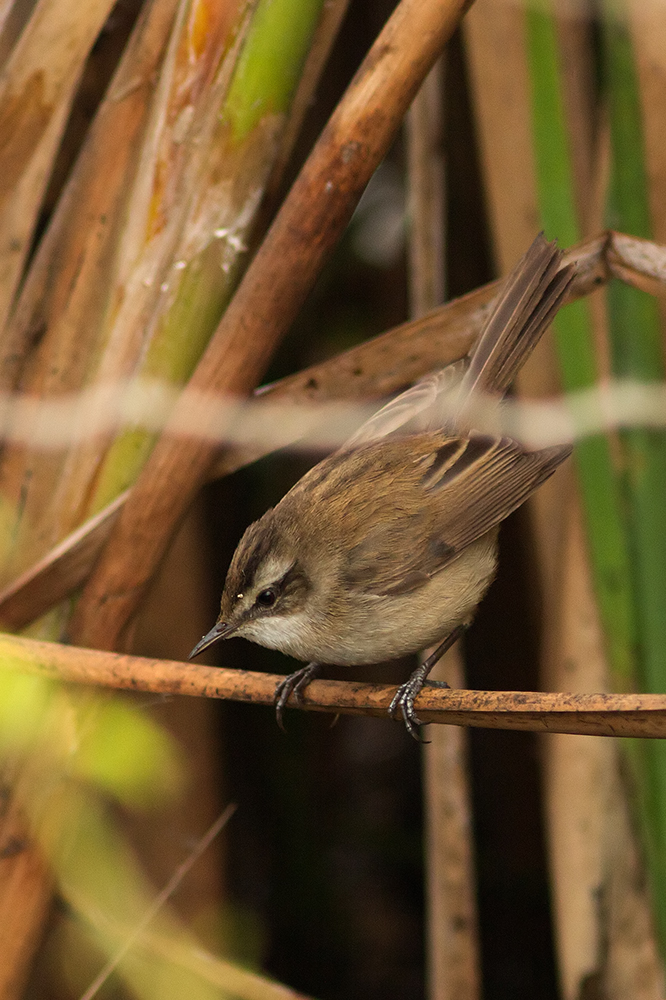
Smoky warbler

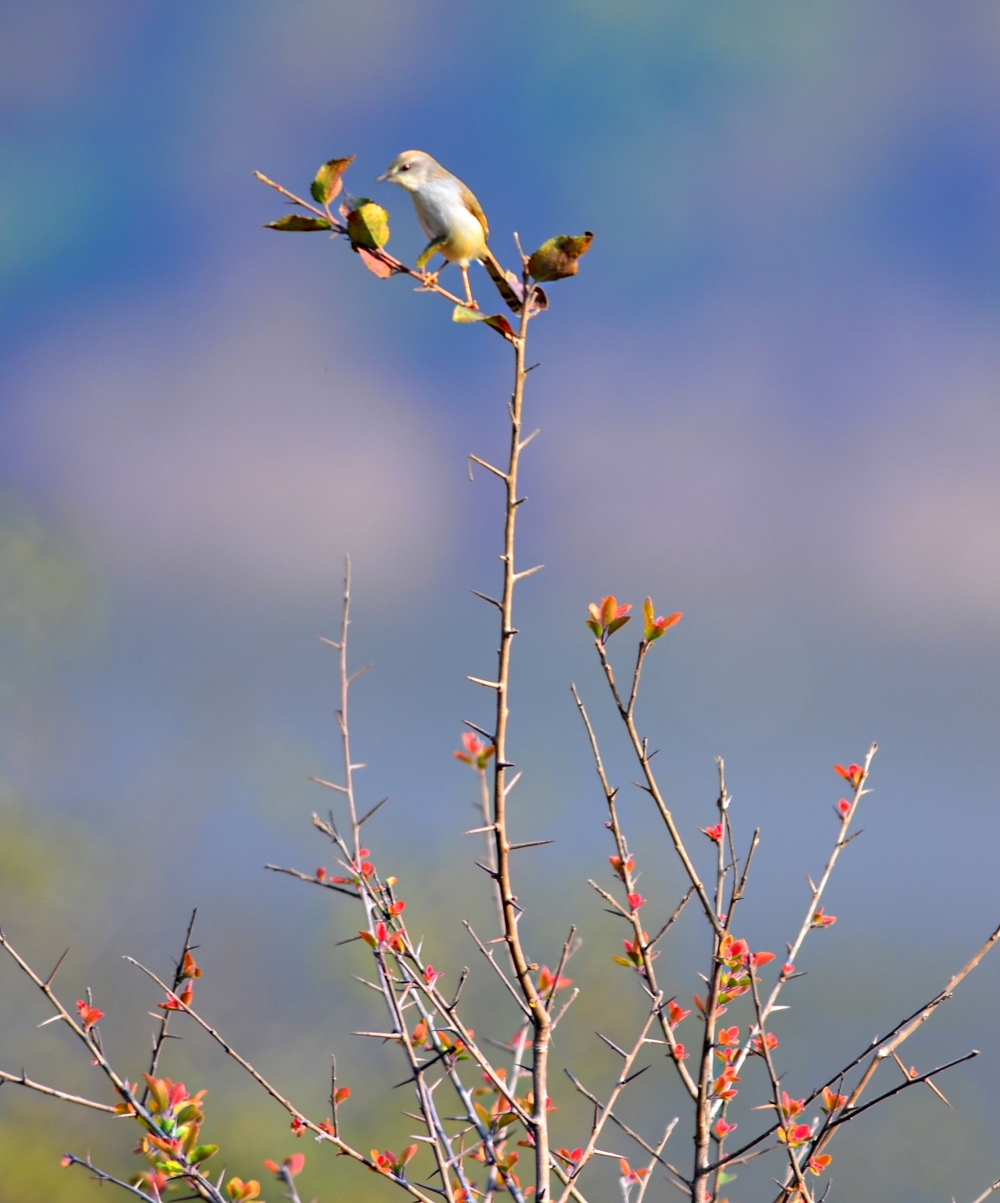
Yellow-bellied prinia

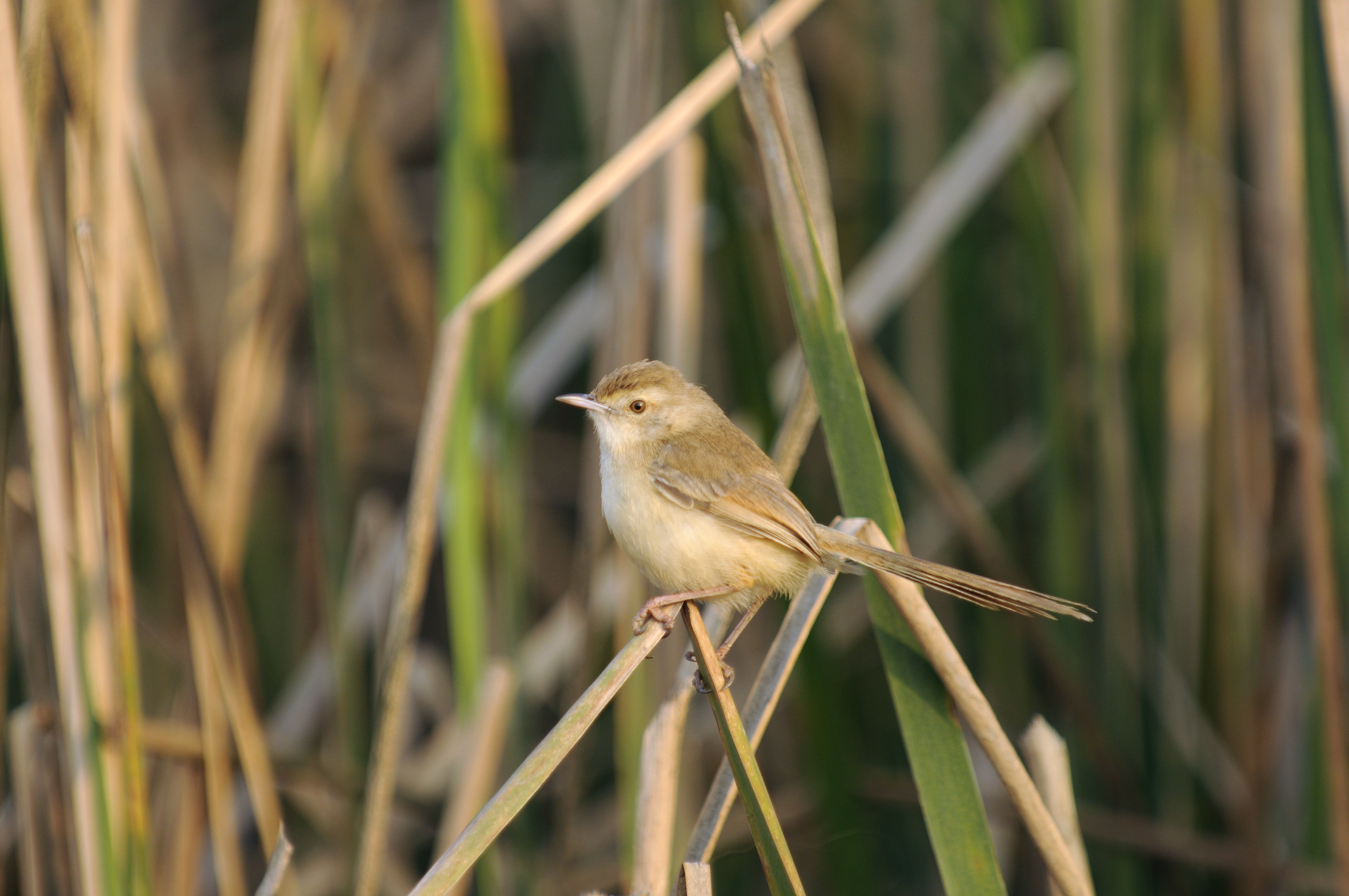
Plain Prinia

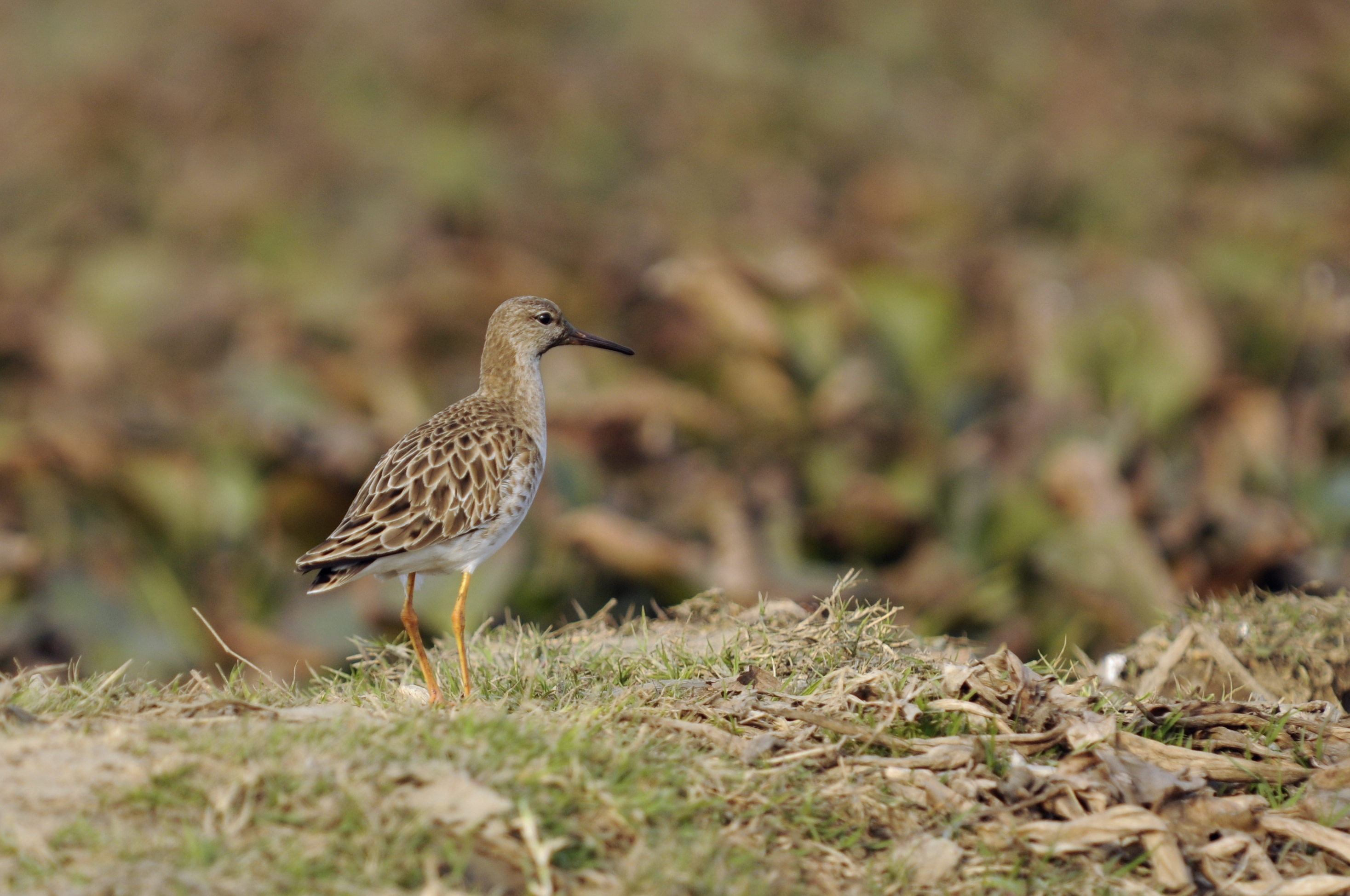
Ruff in winter plumage

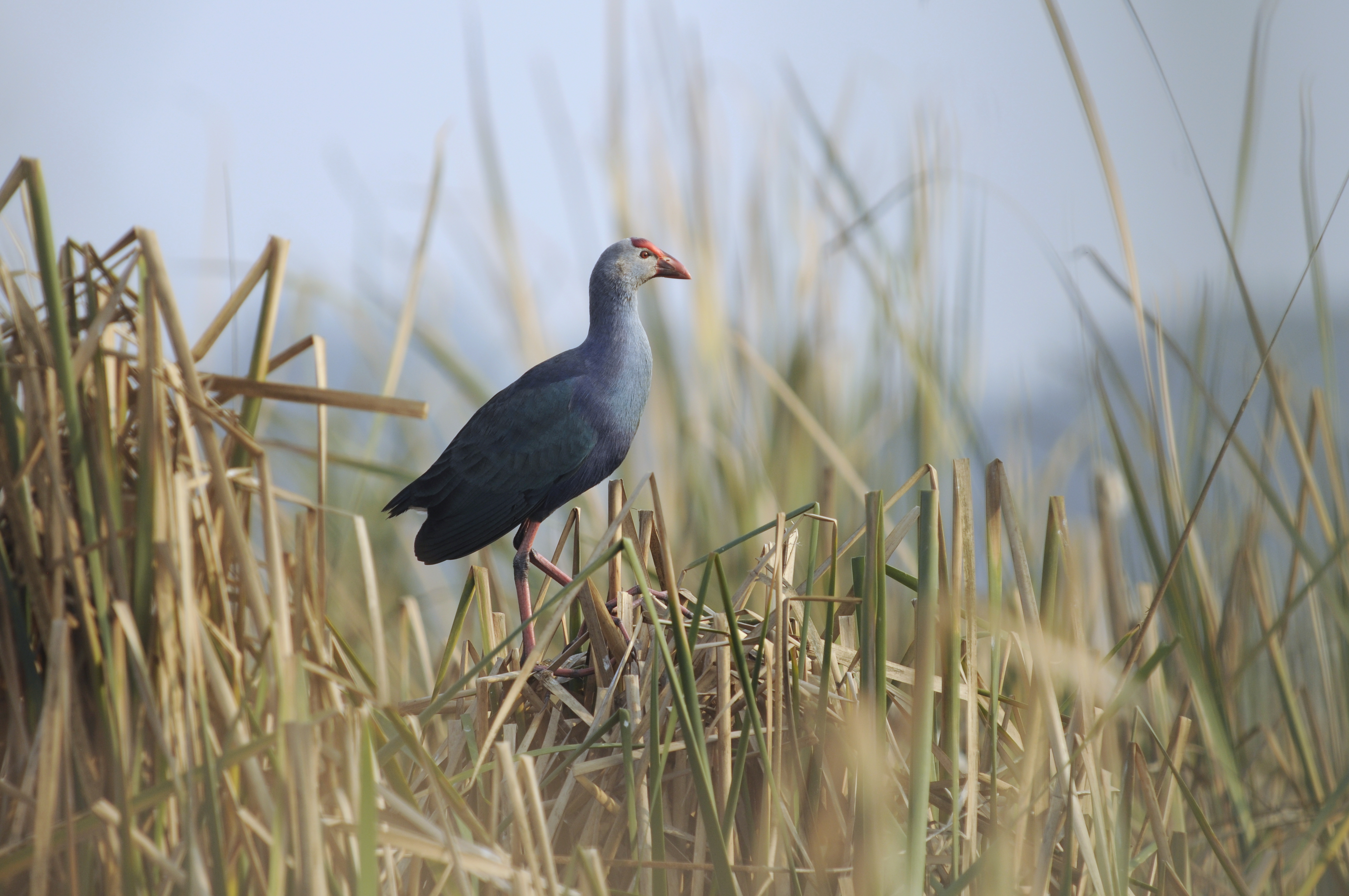
Grey-headed Swamphen breeds here in numbers

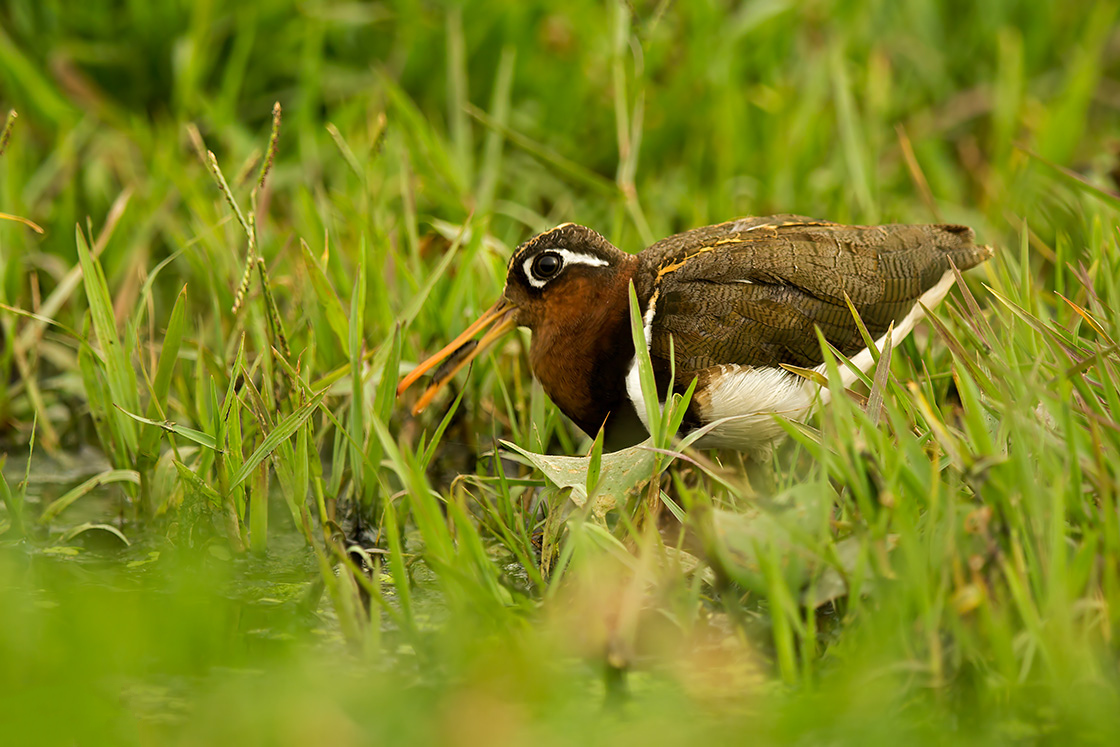
Greater Painted Snipe at Basai

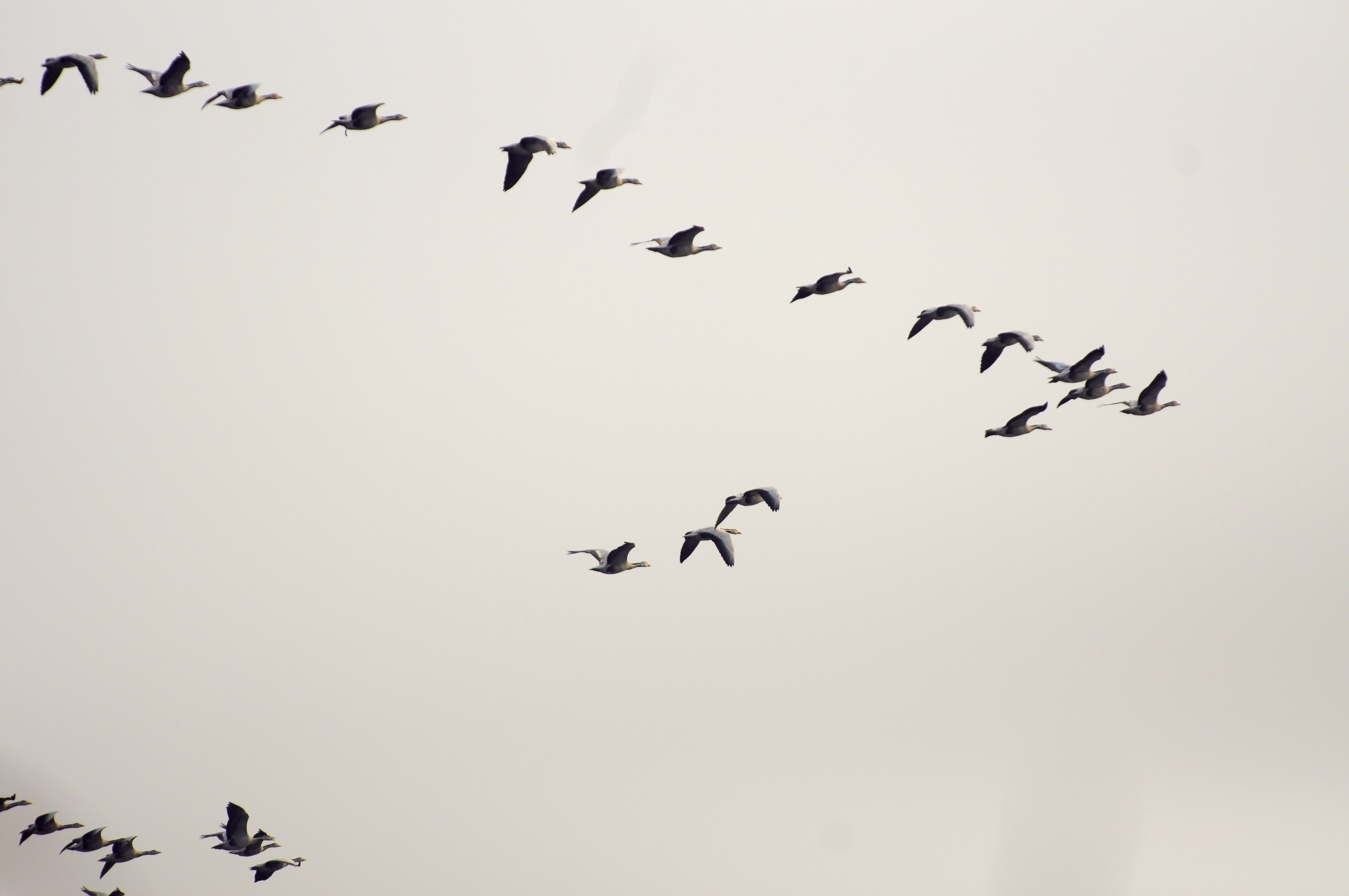
Bar-headed geese in flight

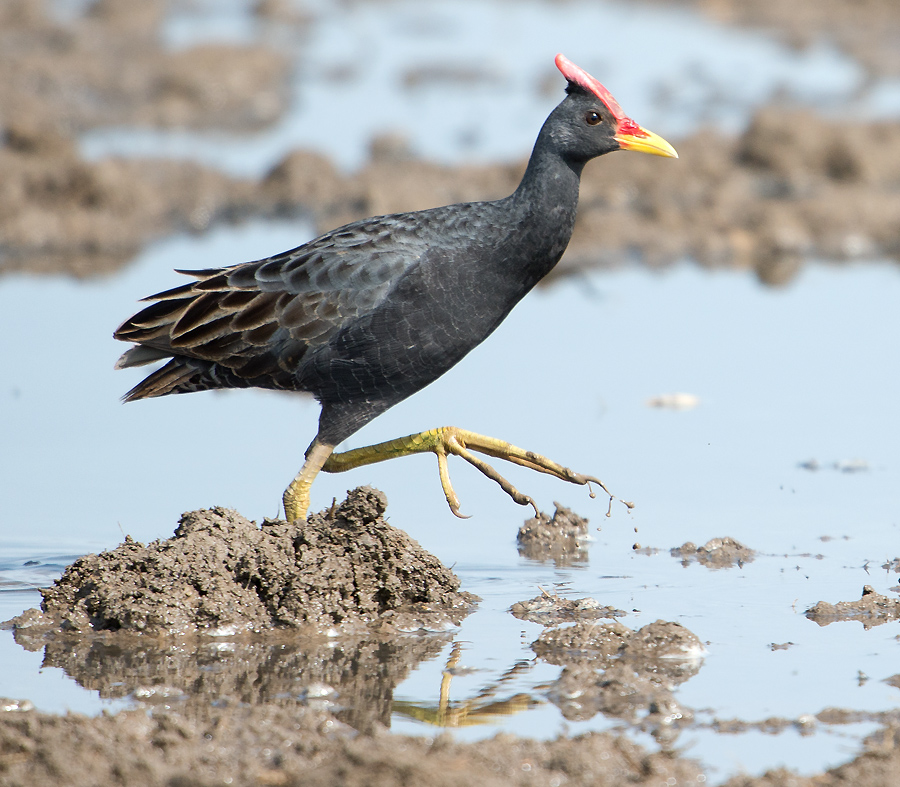
Watercock

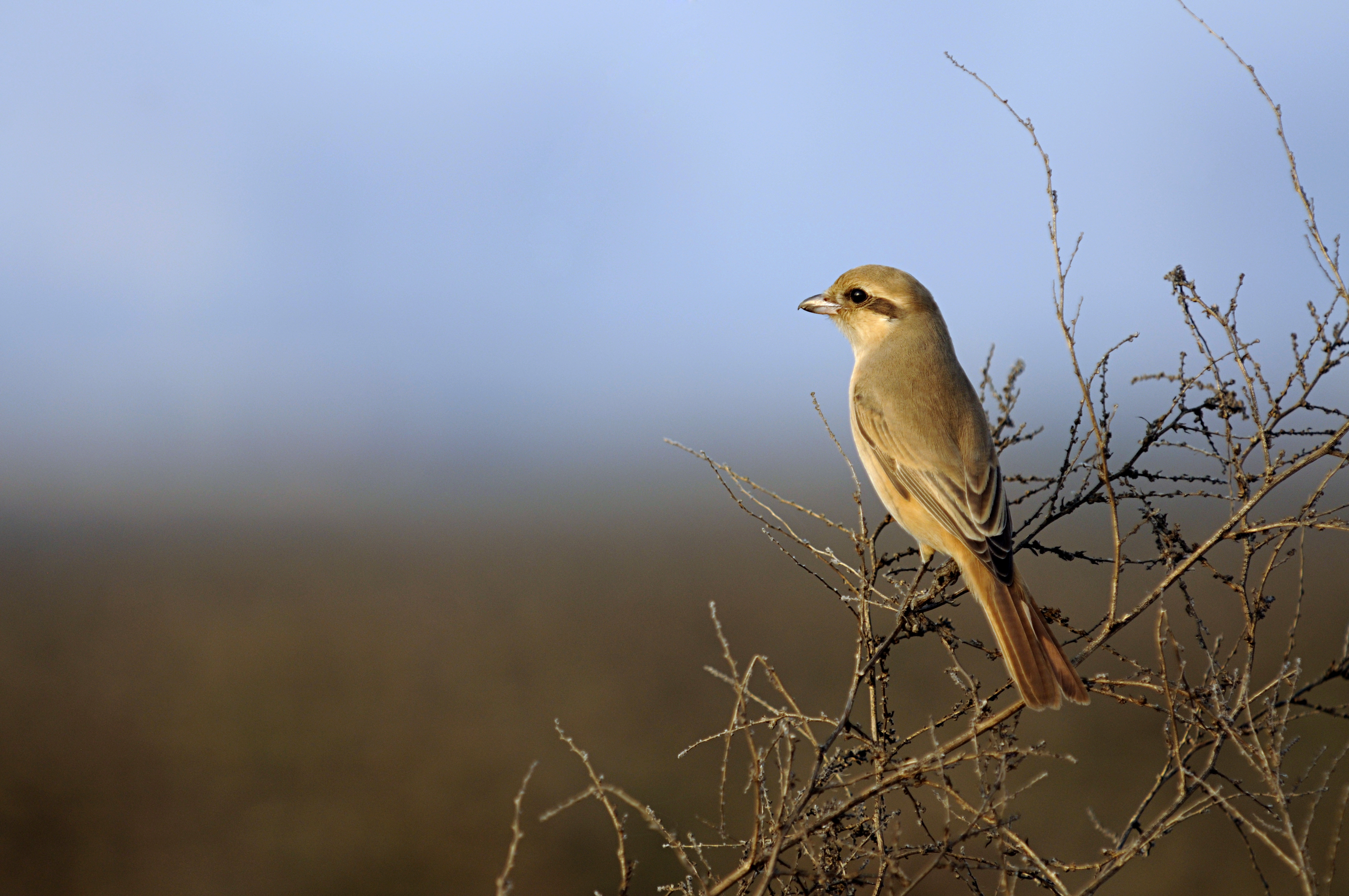
Isabelline Shrike in Basai Wetland

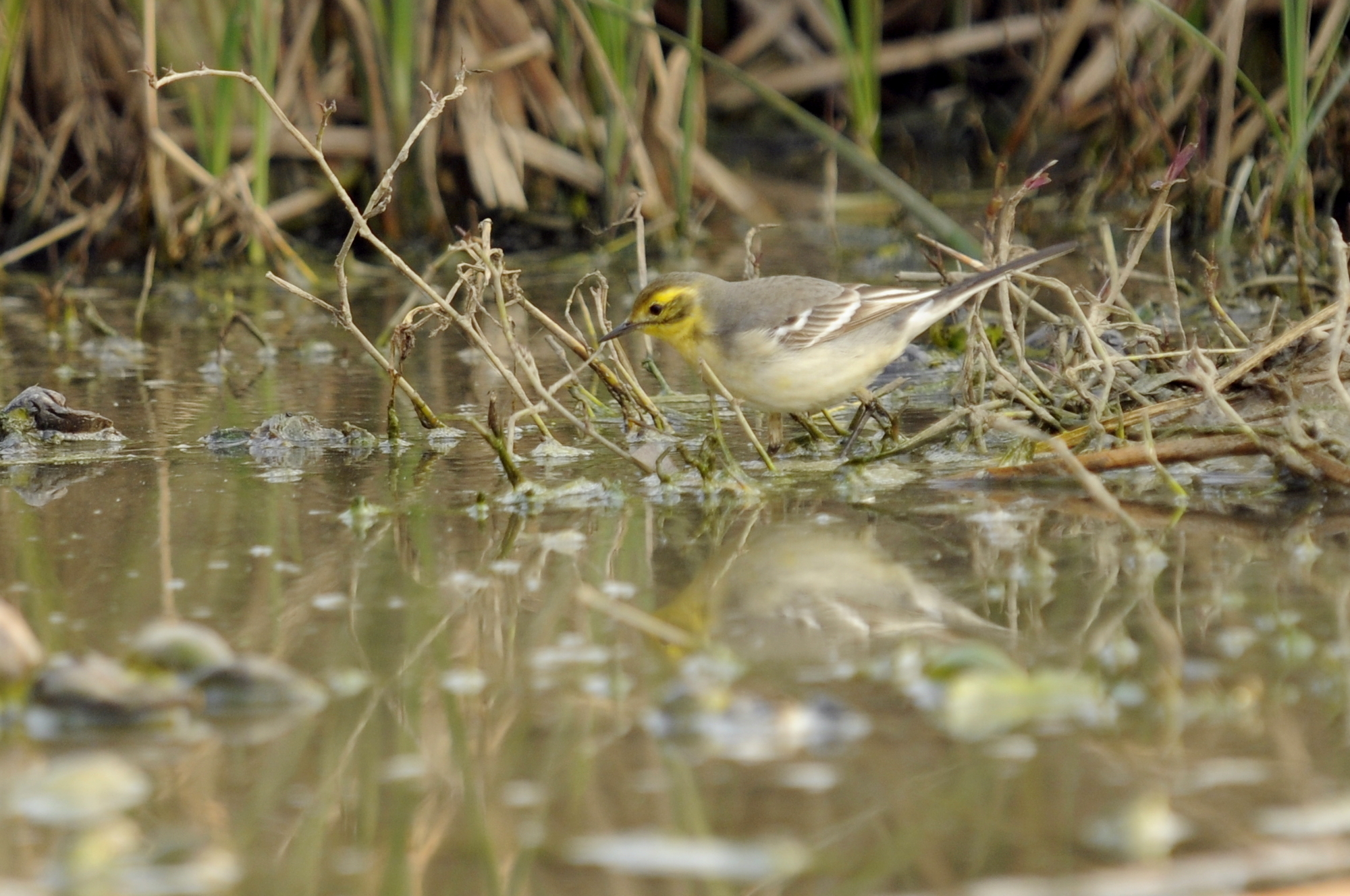
Citrine Wagtail

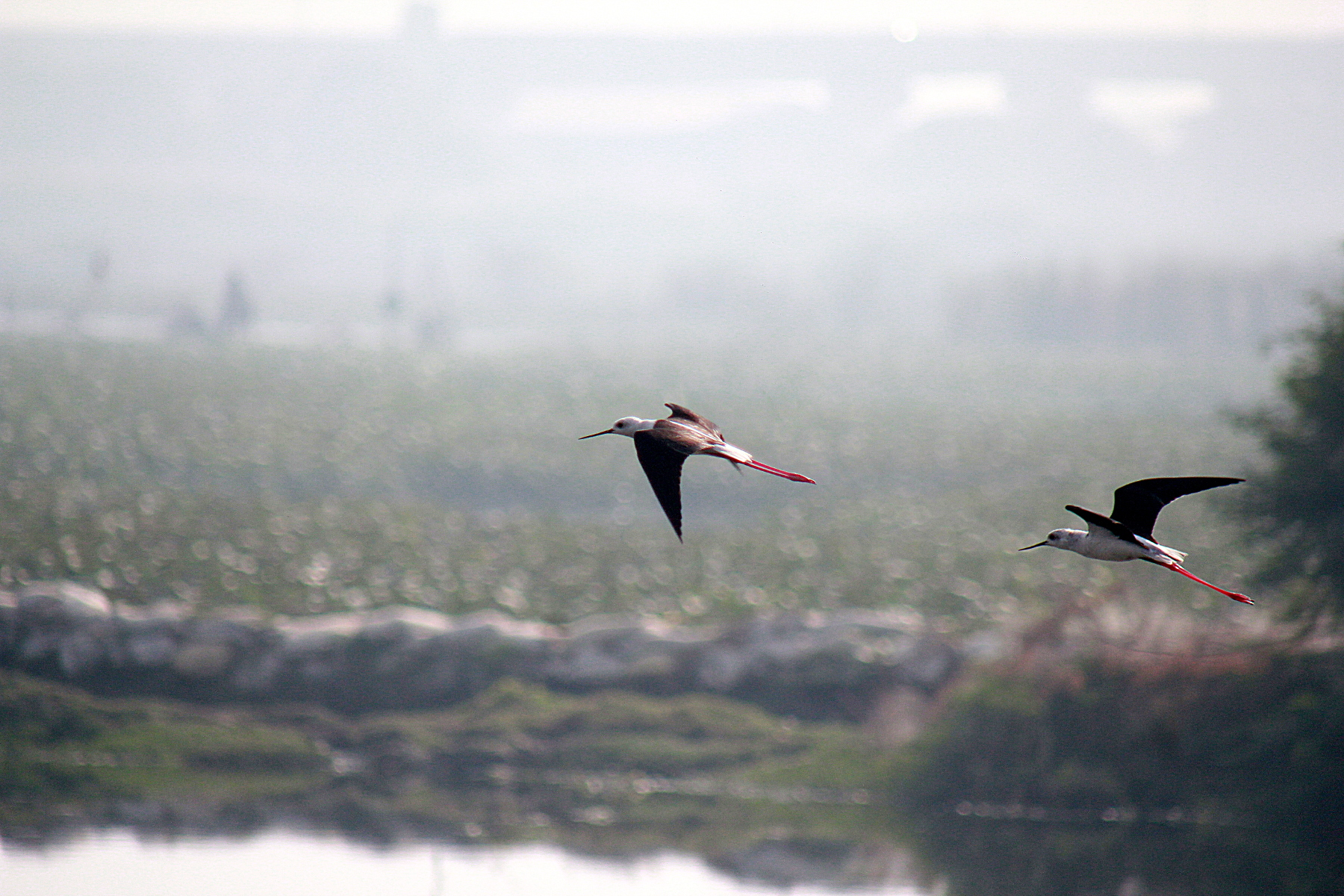
Black-winged Stilts in flight

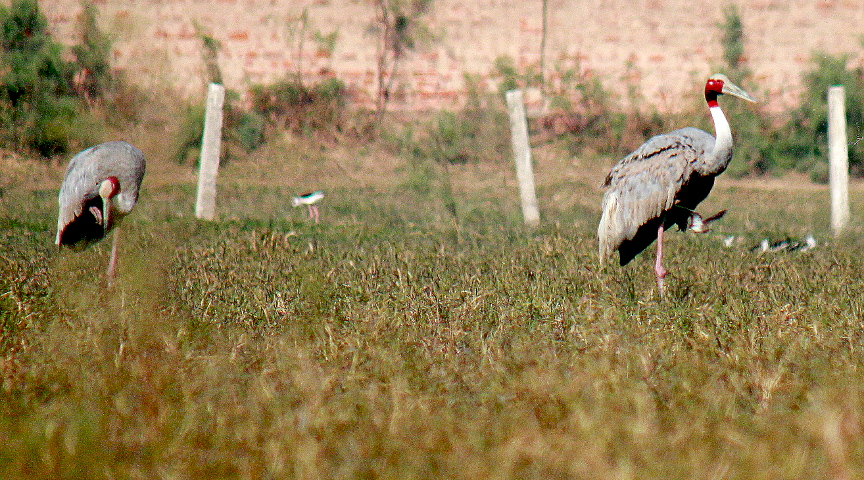
Sarus cranes at Basai

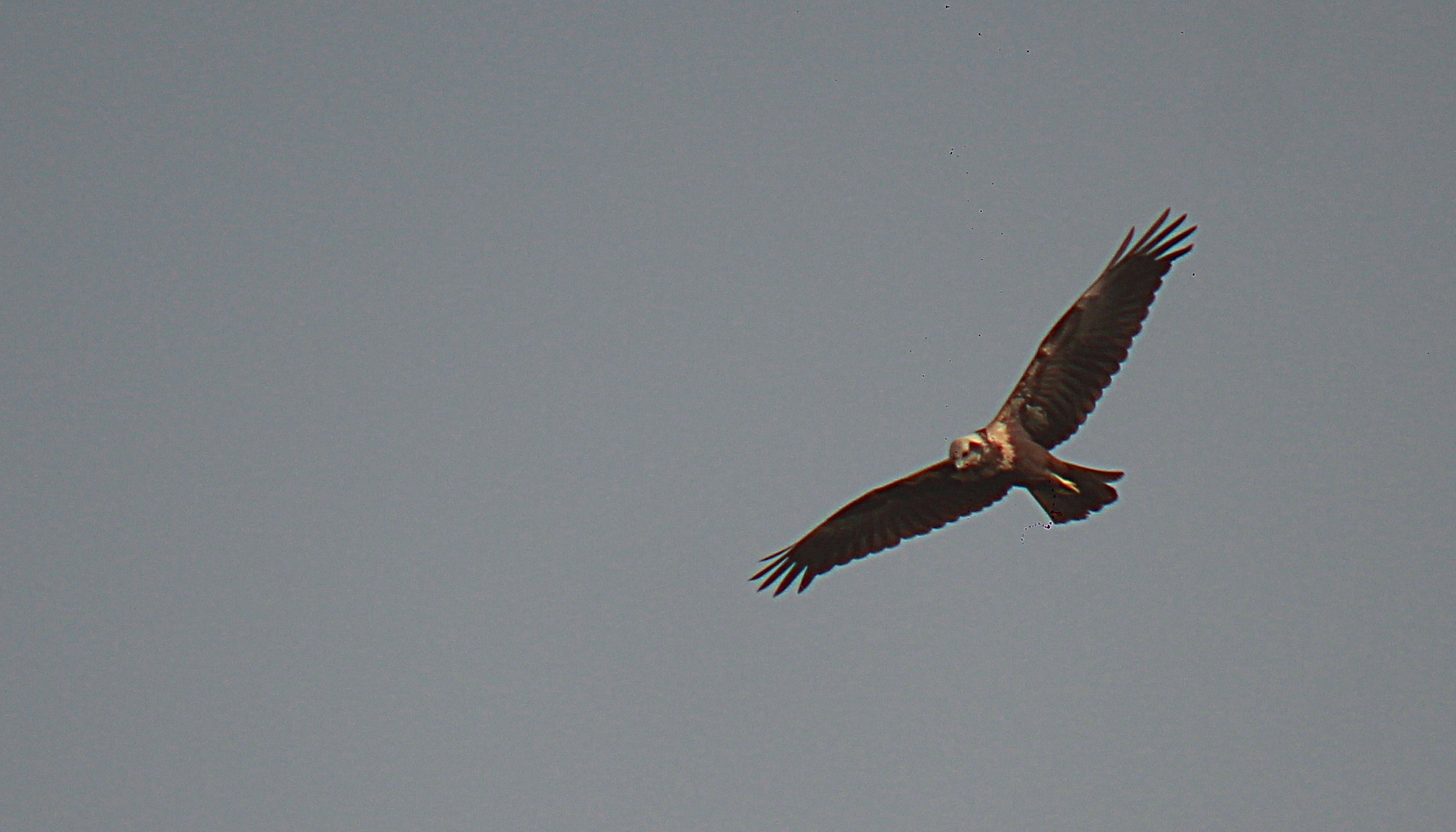
Marsh Harrier

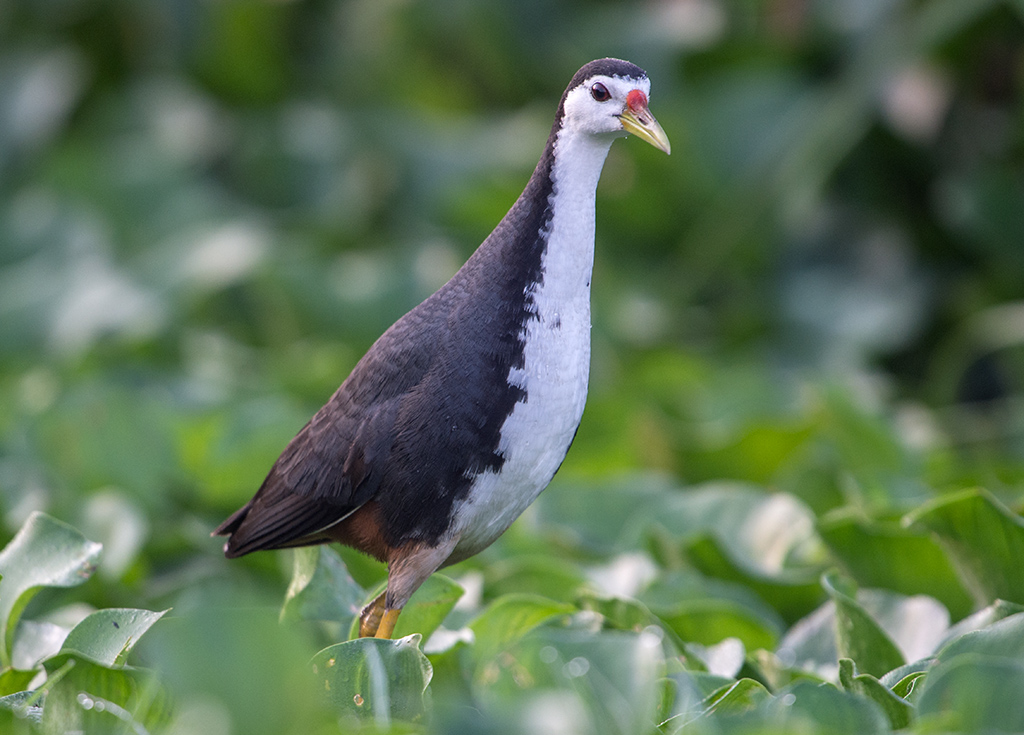
White-breasted Waterhen

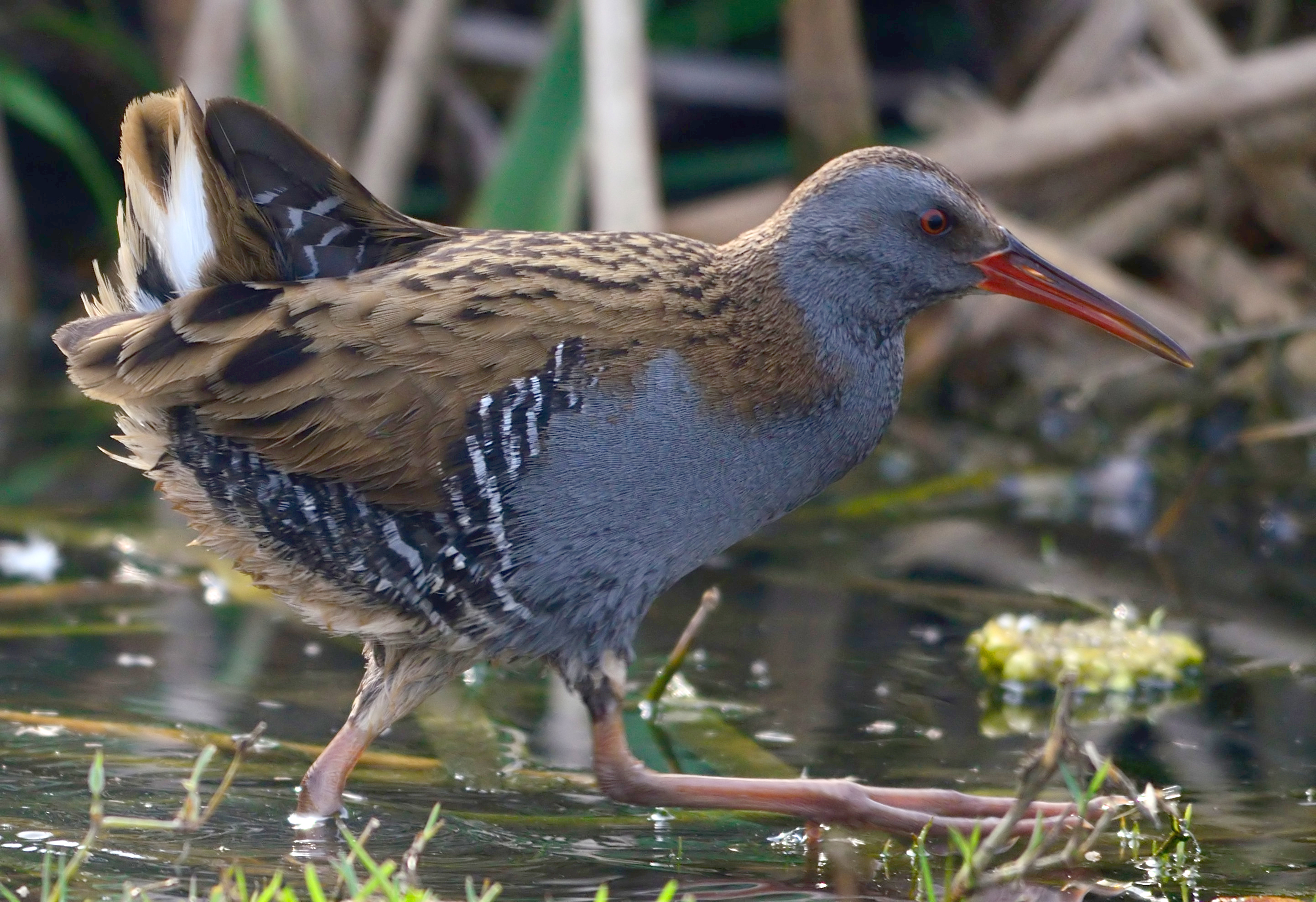
Water Rail at Basai

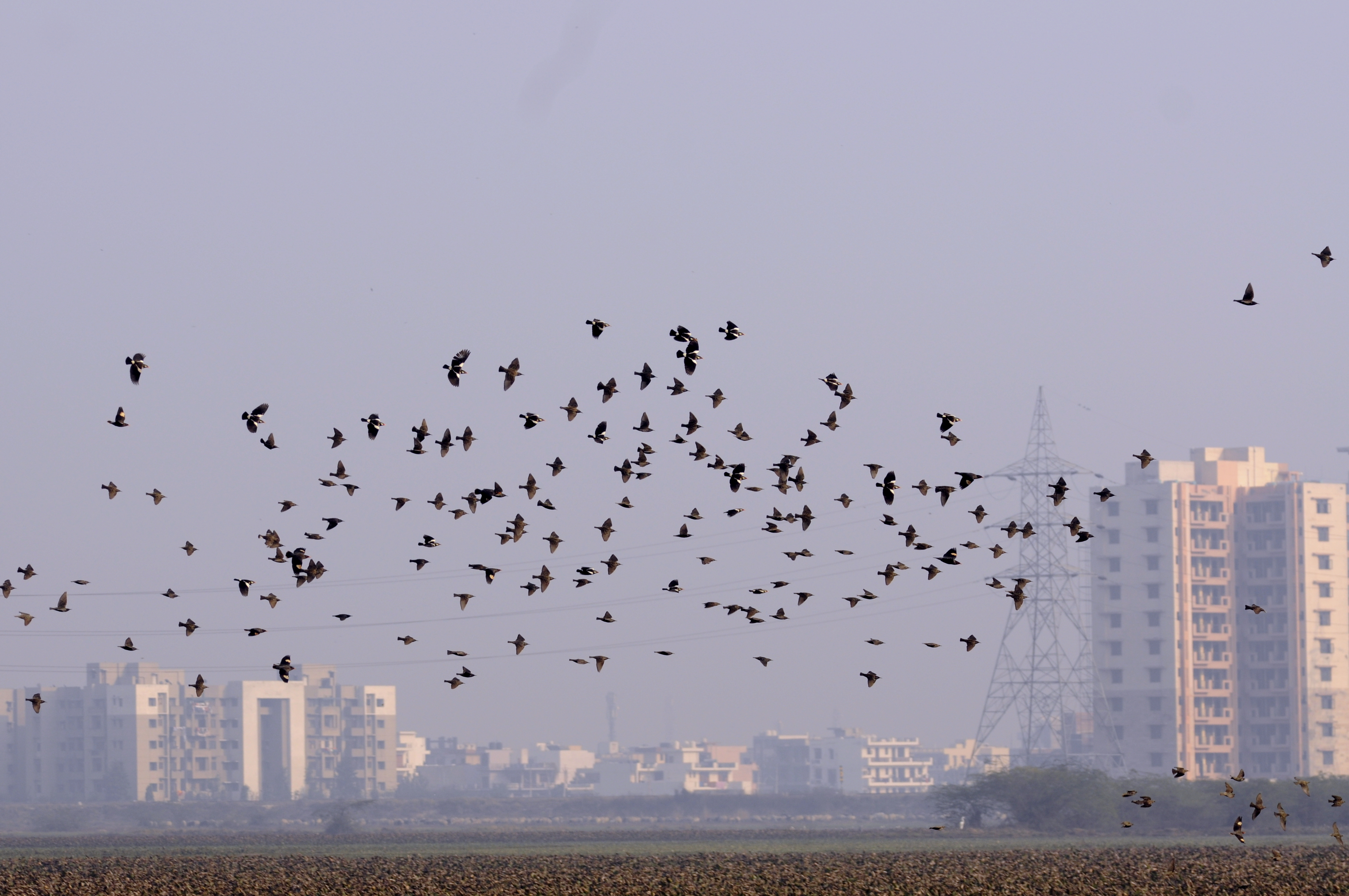
Starling murmuration at Basai

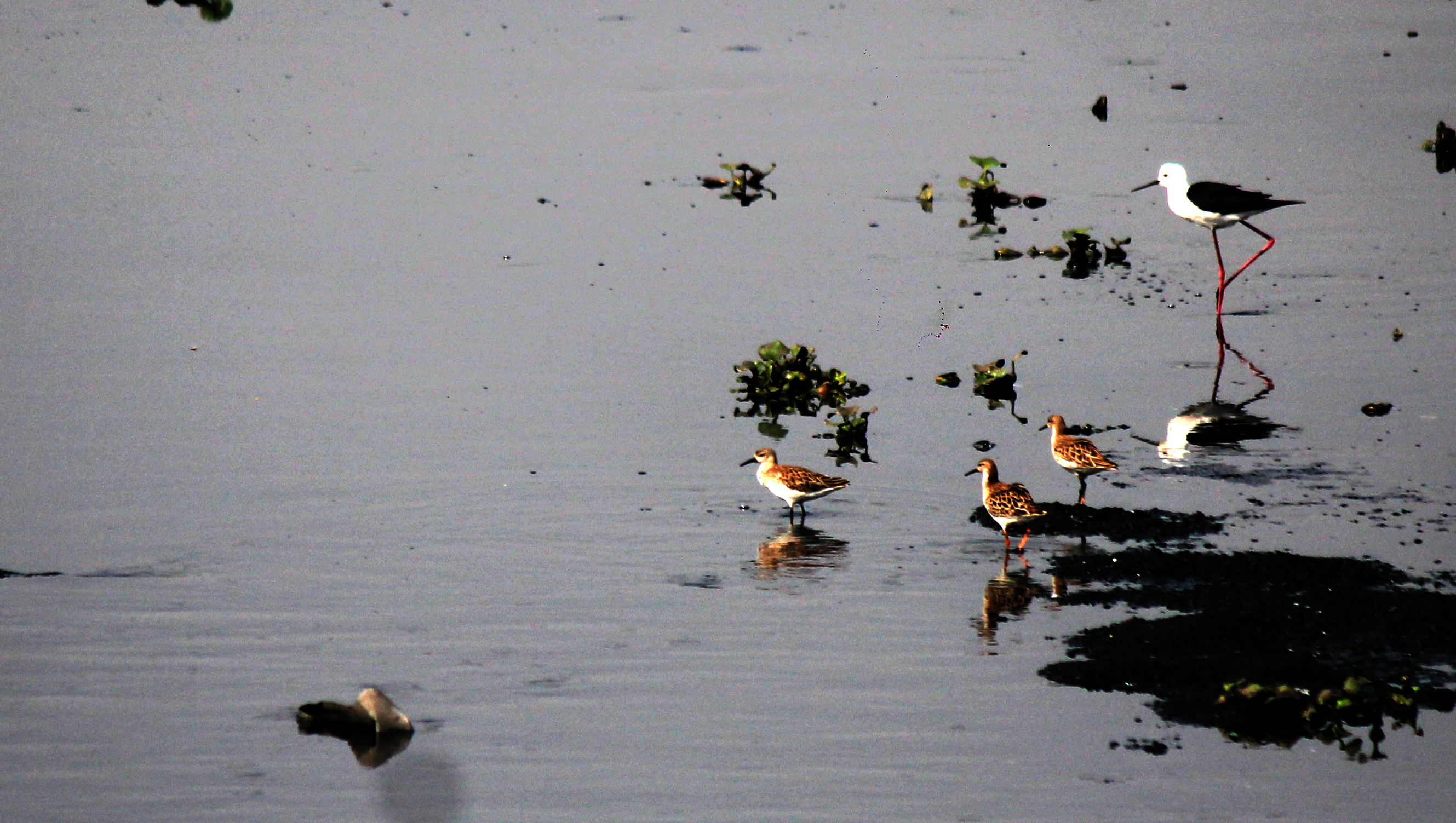
Waders and stilts at Basai

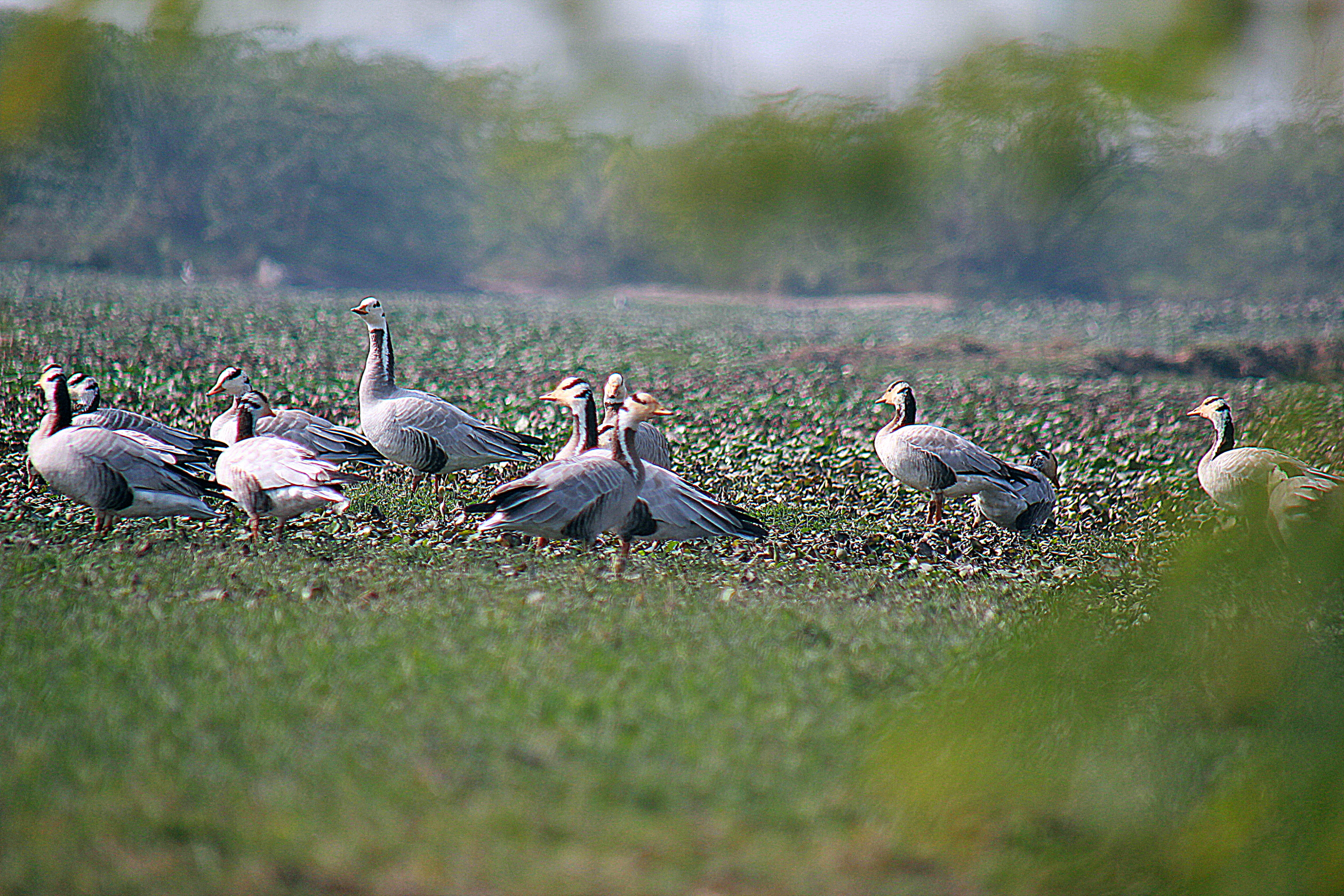
Bar-headed goose flock

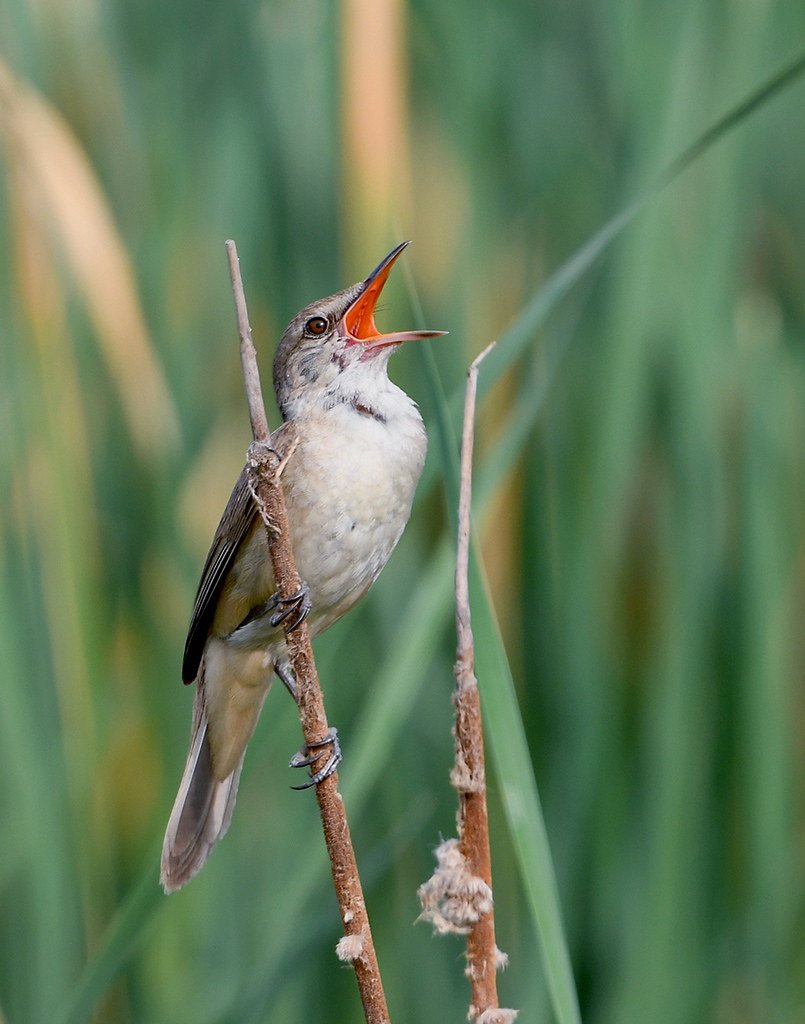
Clamorous reed warbler

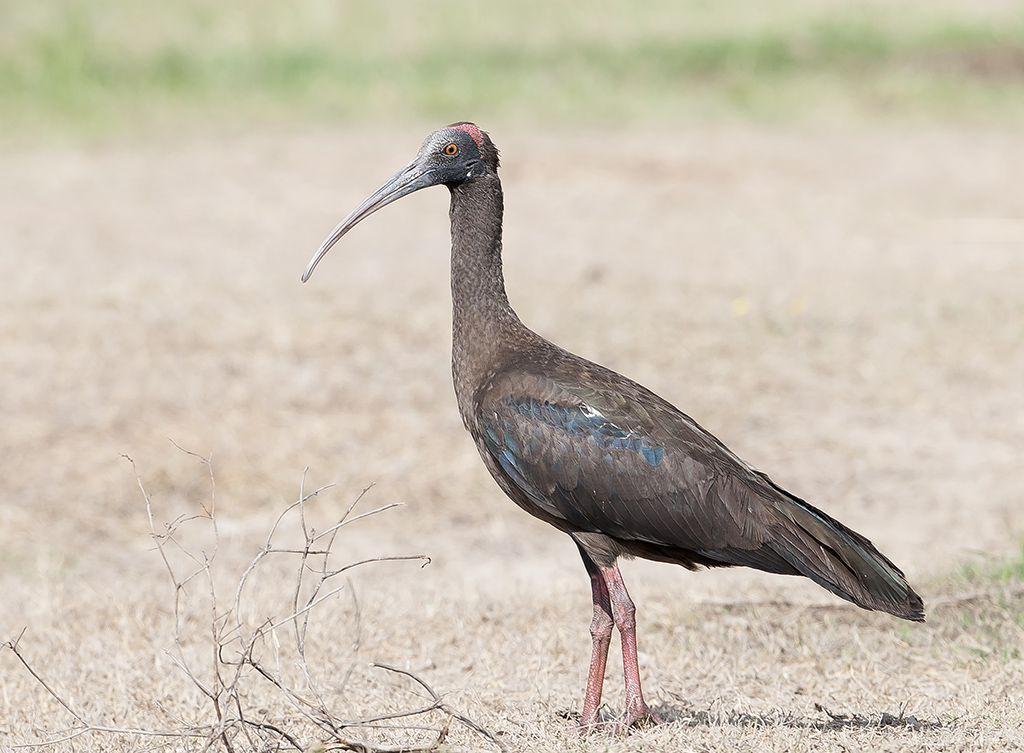
Red-naped ibis in Basai

== Conservation threats ==
Basai village is famed for Basai wetland, home of endangered migrant birds, which is under threat from unsustainable development and urbanization. The location of the wetland near the growing metropolis of Gurgaon has led to loss of agricultural lands and wetlands. Basai Wetland adjoins Sectors 9 and 10 of Gurgaon, major residential areas in the city, which were developed on land acquired from Basai village. Over two decades, around six-sevenths of the village's agricultural land has been lost due to urbanization and residential development. Some agricultural area was also lost for establishing the water treatment plant of Haryana Urban Development Authority, which supplies drinking water to Gurgaon. Basai village has also faced the loss of five of the six village ponds (locally called johads) due to urbanization: three were lost to the residential sectors of Gurgaon, one for a public school, and another was polluted by wastewater from a local factory.

Environmentalists have raised concerns over increasing construction activities, real estate development, and disturbance affecting the wetland and birds. A proposed construction and demolition (C&D) plant by a multinational construction firm, approved by the Gurgaon Municipal Corporation, has raised fresh concerns over habitat loss, dust pollution, and disturbance to the wetland and its rich bird life. A study of birds in the wetland carried out between 2015 and 2017 noted the following major threats to birds: habitat alteration, weed infestation, water scarcity, and discharge of untreated domestic sewage and industrial effluents.

The loss of wetlands and pastures in Basai Wetland has also affected local people, specifically potters and those keeping livestock, whose traditional livelihoods have been eroded and they have had to move into other occupations.

By 2022, environmental assessments indicated the wetland had shrunk to approximately 25% of its original size due to rapid urban encroachment. In addition to construction, the ecosystem is threatened by the clearing of native reed beds for the commercial farming of invasive African catfish, which disrupts the local food web and nesting sites for resident birds.

== See also ==
- Delhi Ridge
- Leopards of Haryana
- Gurugram leopard and deer safari
- National Parks & Wildlife Sanctuaries of Haryana
- Indian Council of Forestry Research and Education
- Gurugram Bhim Kund (Hindi: गुरुग्राम भीम कुंड), also known as Pinchokhda Jhod (Hindi: पिंचोखड़ा जोहड़)
- Arid Forest Research Institute
- Okhla Sanctuary, bordering Delhi in adjoining Uttar Pradesh
- National Zoological Park Delhi
- Asola Bhatti Wildlife Sanctuary, Delhi
- Bhalswa horseshoe lake, Delhi
- Haryana Tourism
- List of Monuments of National Importance in Haryana
- List of State Protected Monuments in Haryana
- List of Indus Valley Civilization sites in Haryana, Punjab, Rajasthan, Gujarat, India & Pakistan
- List of national parks of India
- Wildlife sanctuaries of India

== External ==
Avibase checklist of birds of Basai Wetland

eBird Hotspot Basai Wetland
