= Sultanpur National Park =

National Park in Haryana, India

- IUCN category II (national park)
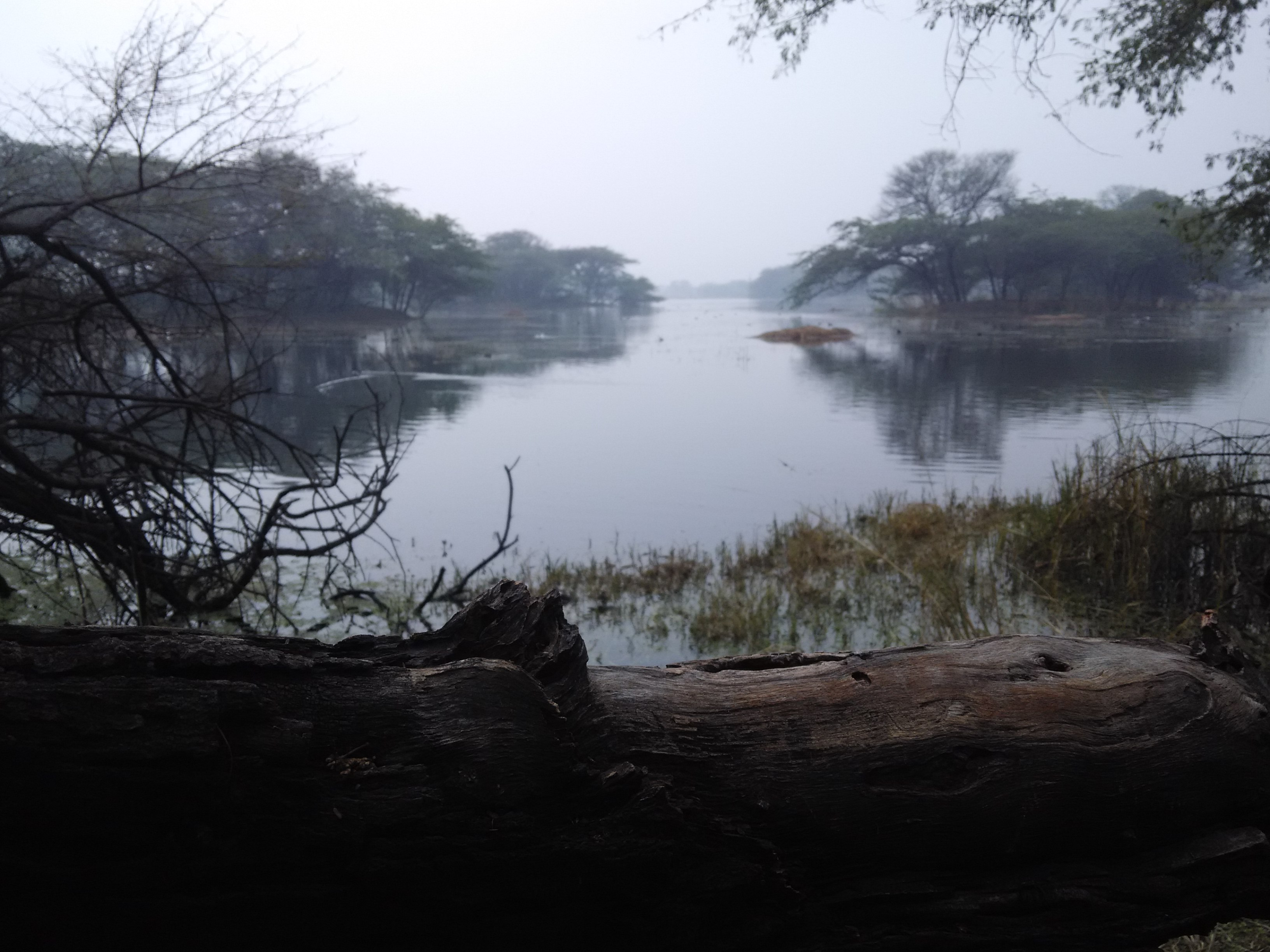

- Location within Haryana Location within India
- Interactive map of Sultanpur National Park
- Location: Gurugram, Haryana, India
- Nearest city: Gurugram
- Coordinates: 28.4623°N 76.8899°E
- Area: 1.43 km^{2} (0.55 sq mi)
- Established: 1991
- Governing body: Forests Department, Haryana
- Website: www.haryanaforest.gov.in

Ramsar Wetland
- Designated: 25 May 2021
- Reference no.: 2457

Sultanpur National Park is a national park in Haryana, India, covering approximately 1.43 km^{2} (0.55 sq mi).

== Geography ==
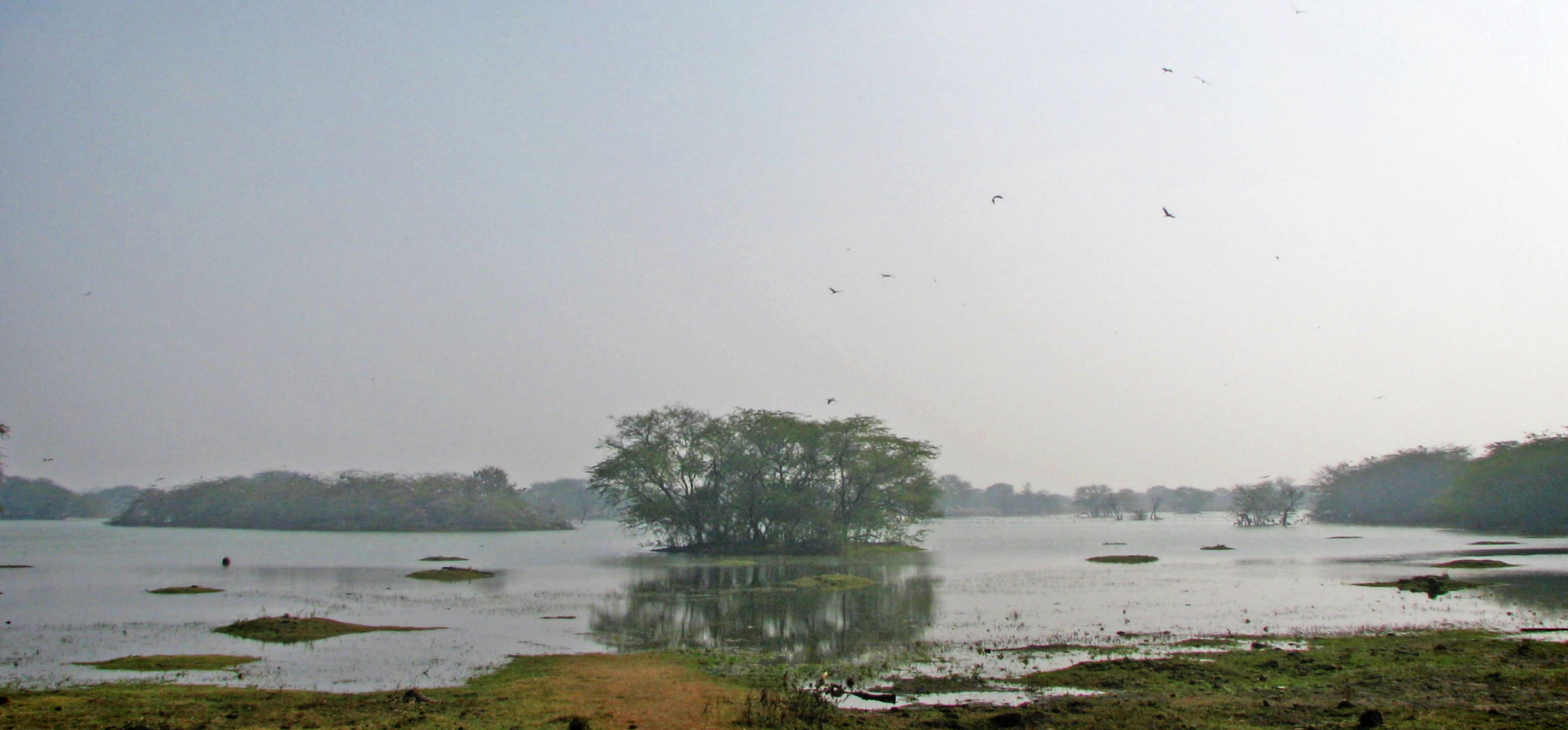
Sultanpur Bird Sanctuary became a National Park in 1991

Sultanpur Bird Sanctuary is located in Sultanpur village, Farrukhnagar, Gurgaon district in the state of Haryana.

== Wildlife ==
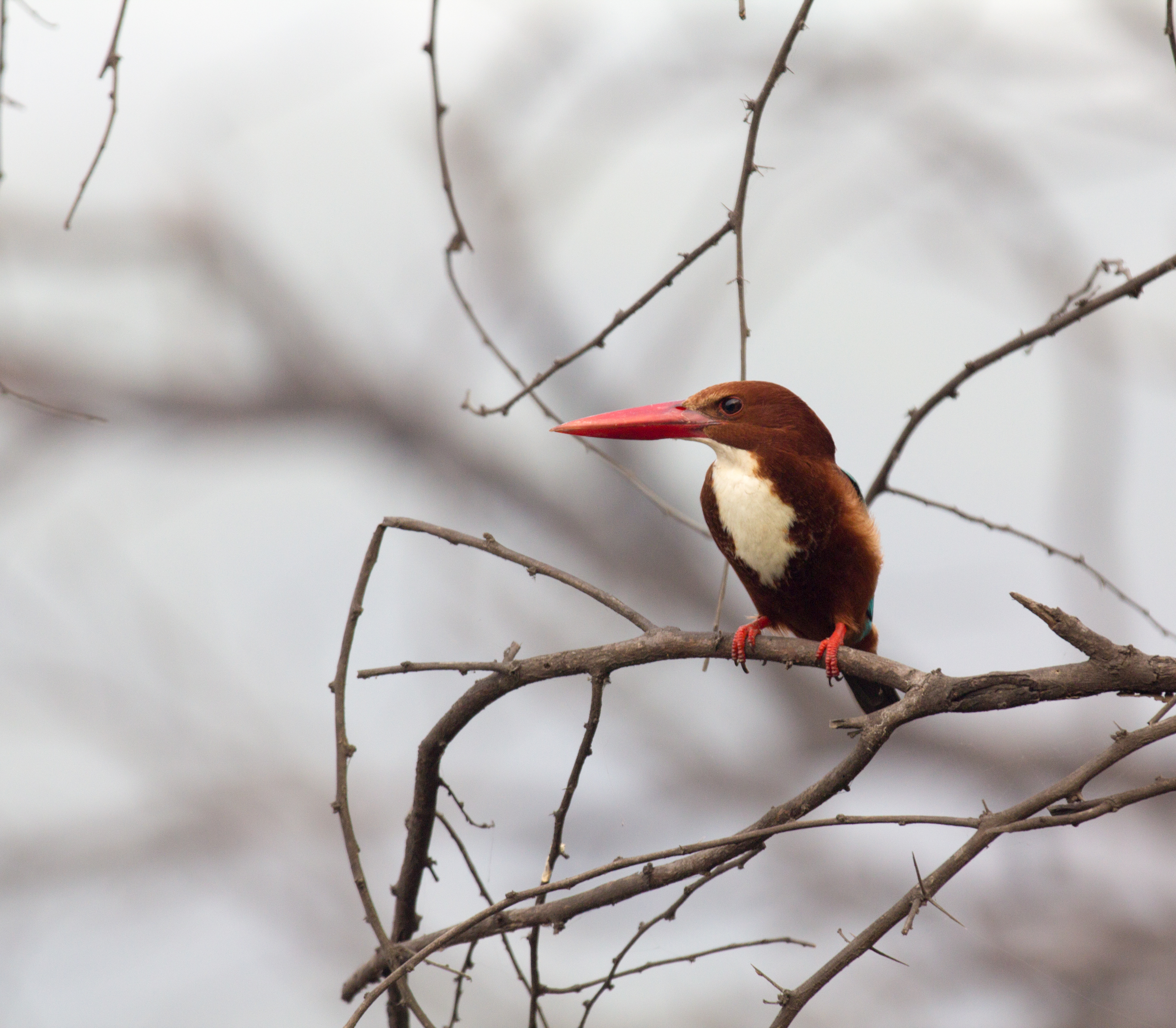
A white-throated kingfisher

Some of the resident birds are common hoopoe, paddyfield pipit, purple sunbird, little cormorant, pigeons, common myna, Eurasian stone-curlew, grey francolin, black francolin, Indian roller, white-throated kingfisher, Indian spot-billed duck, painted stork, common spoonbill, black-headed ibis, black-necked stork, little egret, great egret, cattle egret, red-vented bulbul, rose-ringed parakeet, red-wattled lapwing, shikra, Eurasian collared dove, red collared dove, laughing dove, spotted owlet, rock pigeon, magpie robin, greater coucal, weaver bird, bank mynah, common mynah and Asian green bee-eater and crested lark. Every year more than 100 migratory bird species arrive at Sultanpur in search of feeding grounds and to pass the winter including Siberian cranes, greater flamingo, ruff, black-winged stilt Eurasian teal, common greenshank, northern pintail, yellow wagtail, white wagtail, northern shoveler, great white pelican. In addition to the many birds, animals such as nilgai, Bengal fox and blackbuck are also seen here. Trees which are popular with the birds like acacia nilotica, acacia tortilis, berberis and neem have been planted.

== History ==
As a bird sanctuary it was the find of Peter Jackson who wrote to Prime Minister of India, Indira Gandhi, founder of the society, in 1970 about the need to declare the Sultanpur jheel (lake) near Delhi a bird sanctuary, and she asked him to take her there. She had to cancel at the last minute, but later instructed then Chief Minister of Haryana, Bansi Lal, to protect the wetland. As a result the area was declared a bird sanctuary in 1972. In July 1991, the area was upgraded to a national park. It has an area of 1.43 km^{2} (0.55 sq mi).

== See also ==
- Basai wetland
- Haryana Tourism
- List of Monuments of National Importance in Haryana
- List of State Protected Monuments in Haryana
