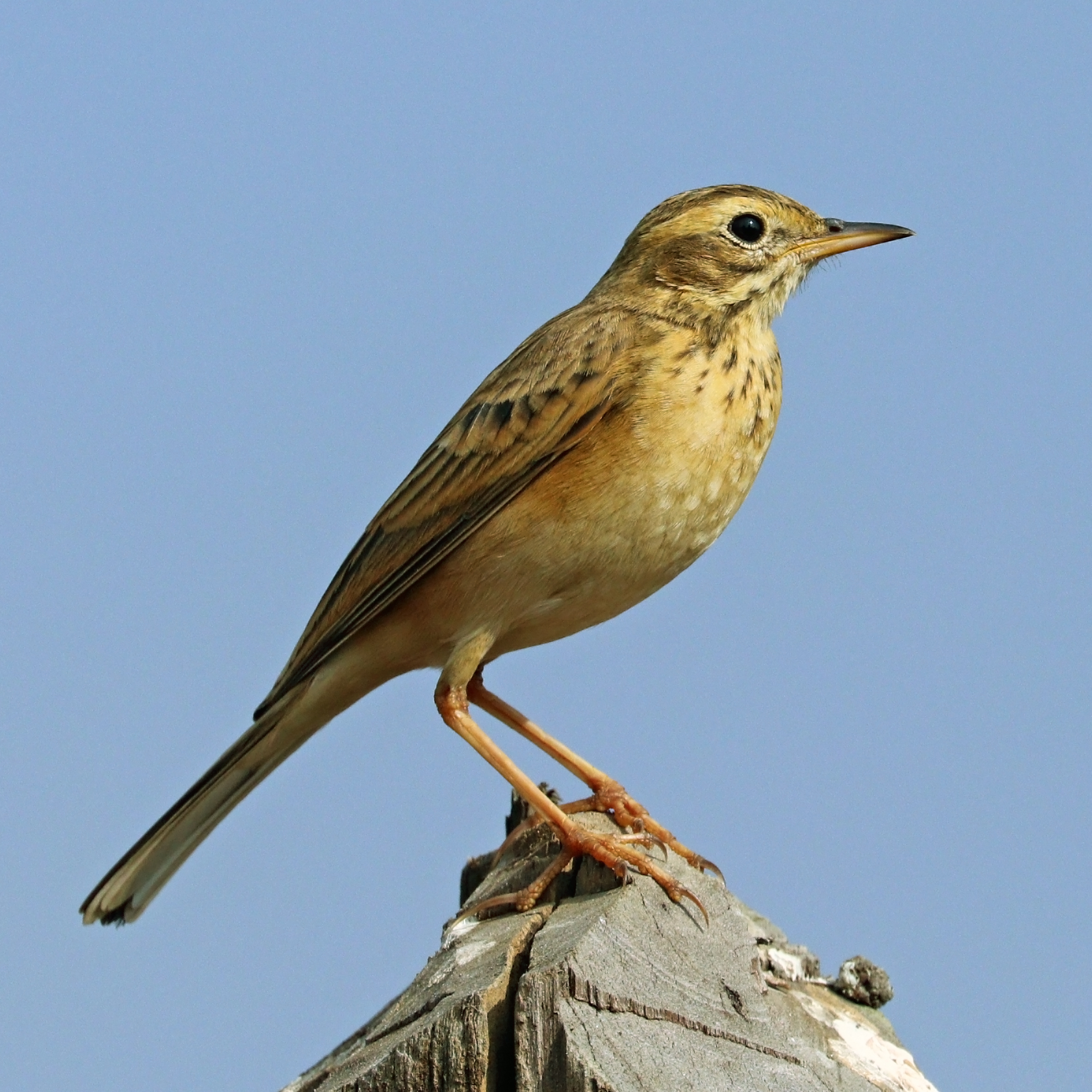
- A. r. rufulus Kanha National Park, Madhya Pradesh, India

Conservation status
- Least Concern (IUCN 3.1)

Scientific classification
- Kingdom: Animalia
- Phylum: Chordata
- Class: Aves
- Order: Passeriformes
- Family: Motacillidae
- Genus: Anthus
- Species: A. rufulus

Binomial name
- Anthus rufulus Vieillot, 1818

Synonyms
- Corydalla rufula

= Paddyfield pipit =

Species of bird

The paddyfield pipit or Oriental pipit (Anthus rufulus) is a small passerine bird in the pipit and wagtail family. It is a resident (non-migratory) breeder in open scrub, grassland and cultivation in southern Asia east to the Philippines. Although among the few breeding pipits in the Asian region, identification becomes difficult in winter when several other species migrate into the region. The taxonomy of the species is complex and has undergone considerable changes.

== Description ==
This is a large pipit at 15 cm, but is otherwise an undistinguished looking bird, mainly streaked grey-brown above and pale below with breast streaking. It is long legged with a long tail and a long dark bill. Sexes are similar. Summer and winter plumages are similar. Young birds are more richly coloured below than adults and have the pale edges to the feathers of the upper parts more conspicuous with more prominent spotting on the breast. The population waitei from north-western India and Pakistan is pale while the population malayensis from the Western Ghats is larger, darker and more heavily streaked with the nominate rufulus intermediate.

In winter some care must be taken to distinguish this from other pipits that winter in the area, such as Richard's pipit, Anthus richardi and Blyth's pipit, Anthus godlewskii. The paddyfield pipit is smaller and dumpier, has a shorter looking tail and has weaker fluttering flight. The usually uttered characteristic chip-chip-chip call is quite different from usual calls of Richard's pipit (an explosive shreep) and Blyth's pipit (a nasal pschreen). The tawny pipit has less streaking on the mantle and has a black loral stripe and a longer tail. The Western Ghats population can appear very similar to the Nilgiri pipit.

== Taxonomy and systematics ==
Some of the subspecies in the group were formerly treated as a subspecies of the Australasian pipit / Richard's pipit complex Anthus novaeseelandiae (sensu lato), and the grouping has been in state of flux. Considerable colour and morphological variation with age and latitude make the species difficult to identify from museum specimens. Five subspecies are currently accepted in this species:

- A. r. rufulus Louis Pierre Vieillot, 1818 – central and eastern Afghanistan through India and Sri Lanka, eastward to southern China and southward to Indochina (syn. A. r. waitei Hugh Whistler, 1936)
- A. r. malayensis Thomas Campbell Eyton, 1839 – in the wet zone of the Western Ghats and Sri Lanka, Malayan Peninsula, Greater Sundas, and southern Indochina; dark plumage
- A. r. lugubris Viscount Walden, 1875 – found in Philippines, including Palawan; possibly also northern Borneo.
- A. r. albidus Erwin Stresemann, 1912 – found in Sulawesi, Bali and the western Lesser Sundas (Lombok, Sumbawa, Komodo, Padar, Rinca, Flores, Sumba).
- A. r. medius Alfred Russel Wallace, 1864 – found in the eastern Lesser Sundas (Sawu, Roti, Timor, Kisar, Leti, Moa, Sermata).

== Behaviour and ecology ==
A widespread species found in open habitats, especially short grassland and cultivation with open bare ground. It runs rapidly on the ground, and when flushed, does not fly far.

The paddyfield pipit breeds throughout the year but mainly in the dry season. Birds may have two or more broods in a year. During the breeding season, it sings by repeating a note during its descent from a short fluttery flight, a few feet above the ground. It builds its nest on the ground under a slight prominence, a tuft of grass, or at the edge of a bush. The nests are woven out of grass and leaves and are normally cup shaped. Exposed nests are sometimes domed or semi-domed, the long grass at the back and sides extending over the top. Nests are lined with finer grass or roots and sometimes with a little dry moss, bracken or other material at the base of the nest. The usual clutch is three or four eggs with greenish ground colour and numerous small brown specks at the larger end. When disturbed near the nest, the birds flutter nearby with weak tsip-tsip-tsip calls. Parent birds may also feign injury to distract predators. Mites are known to cause scaly leg lesions. It feeds principally on small insects but consumes larger beetles, tiny snails, worms etc. while walking on the ground, and may pursue insects like mosquitoes or termites in the air.

A species of Haemoproteus, H. anthi, has been described from this species.

== Gallery ==
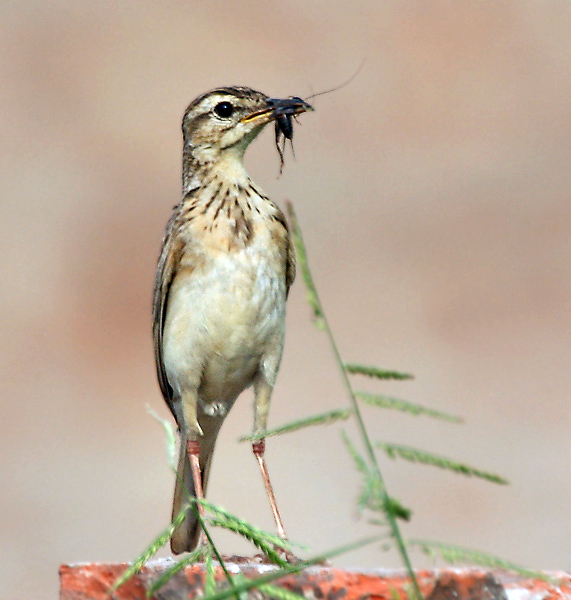
Carrying food for young (Kolkata, West Bengal, India

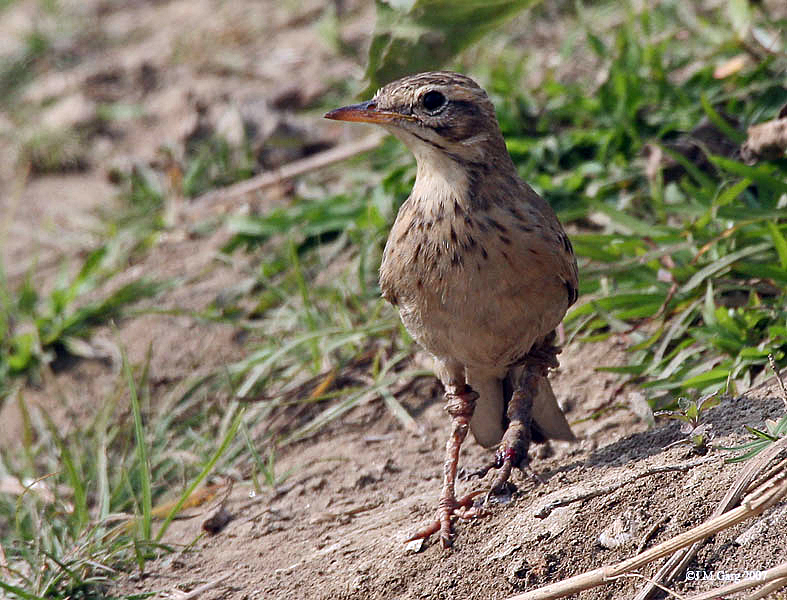
An individual with lesions on the legs (Purbasthali, West Bengal

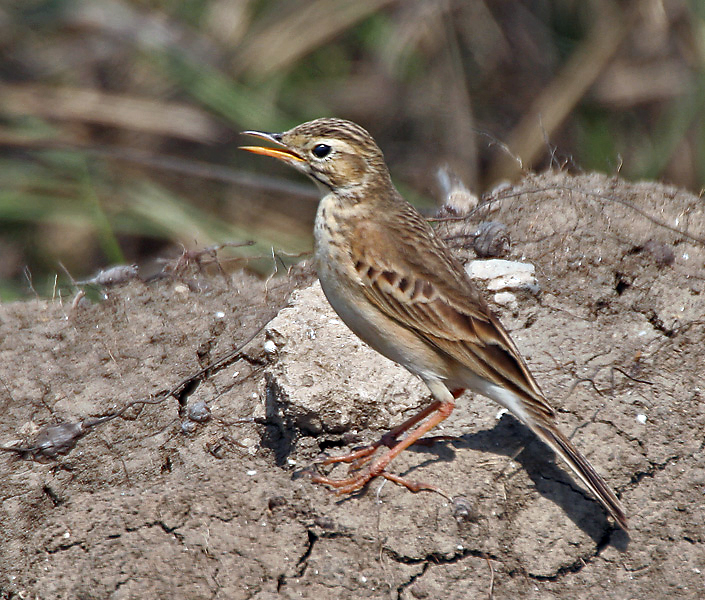
Calling at Sultanpur National Park in Gurgaon District of Haryana, India

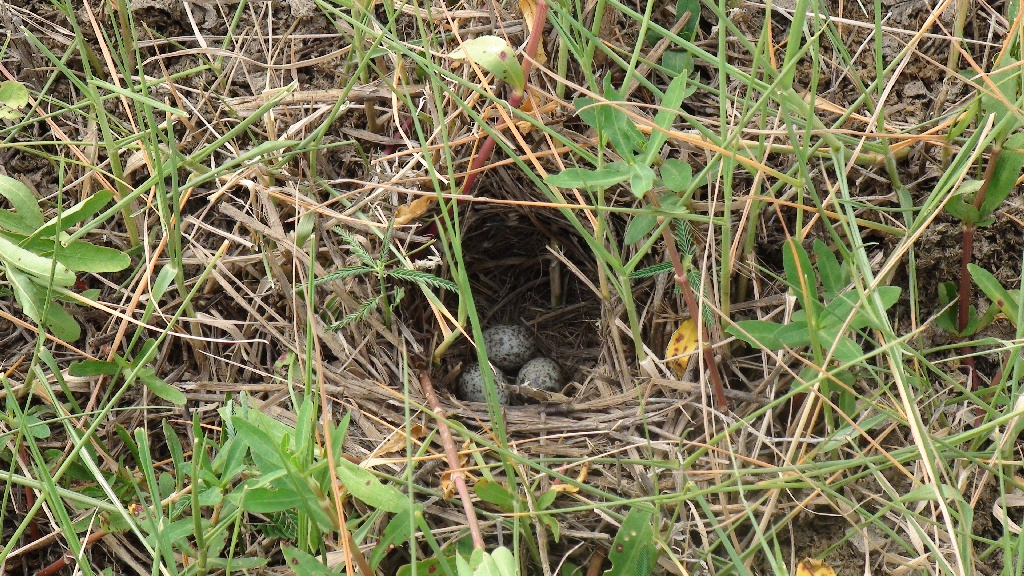
Cup shaped nest with three eggs from Hoskote near Bangalore, India

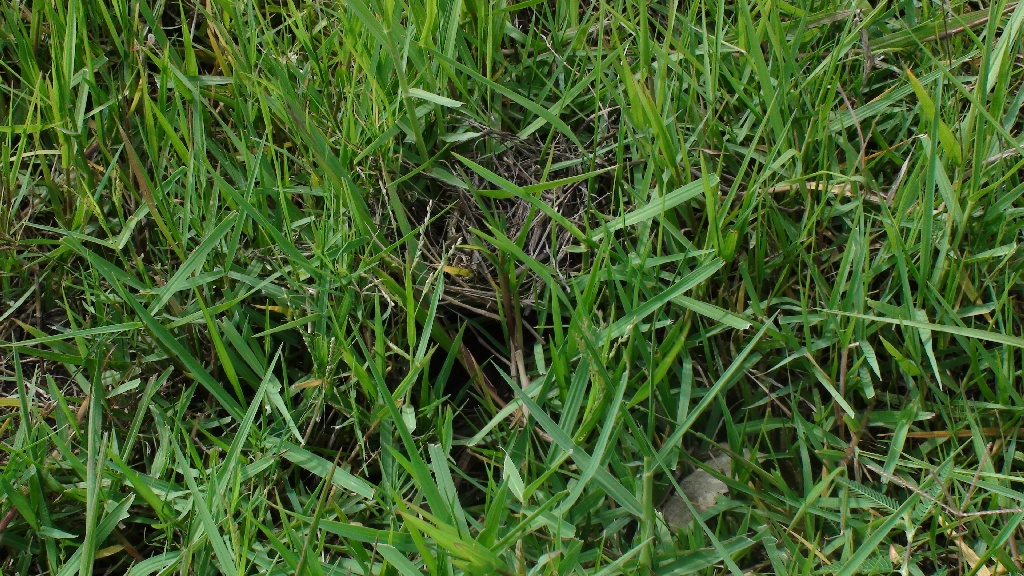
Dome shaped nest from Hoskote near Bangalore, India

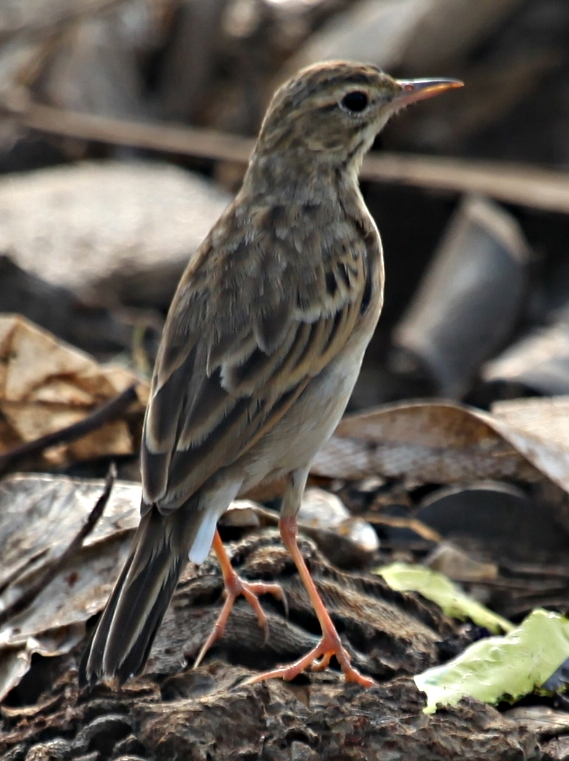
Mohali, Punjab, India

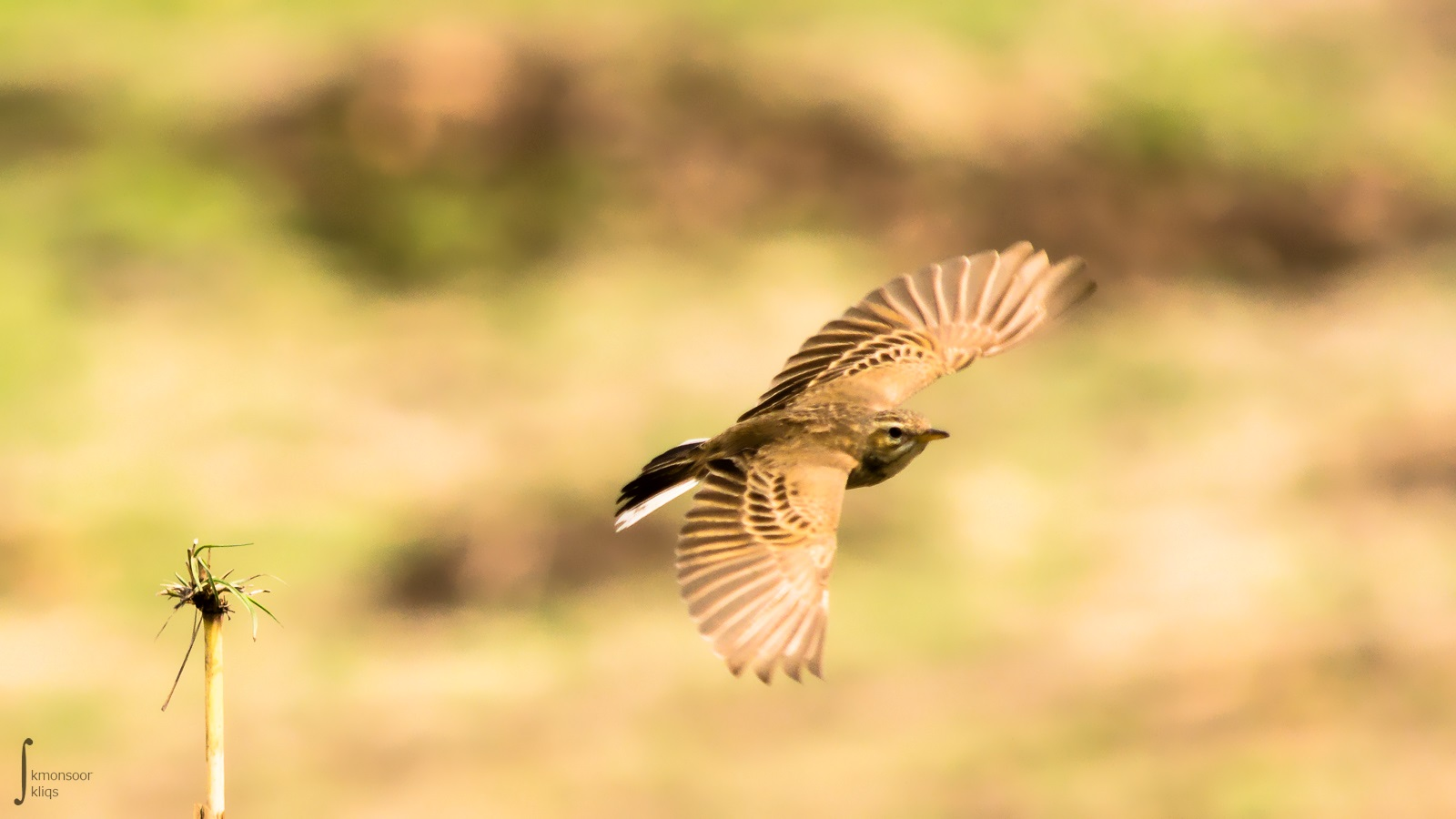
Wide-span flying Paddyfield pipit from Dhaka, Bangladesh

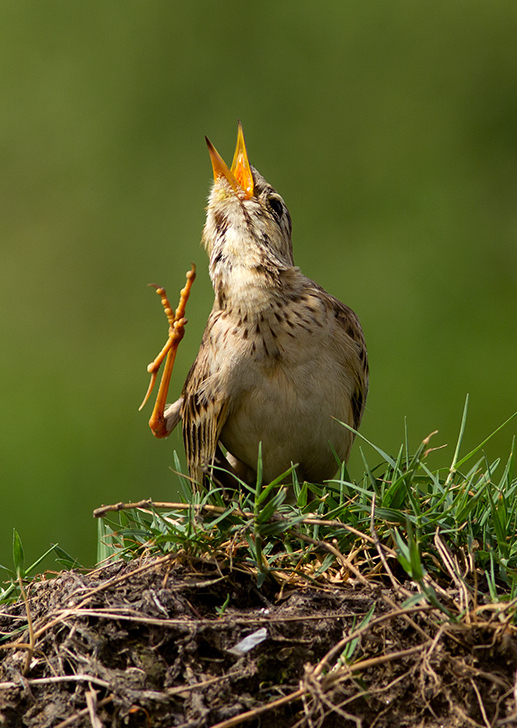
Paddyfield pipit, taken at Basai wetlands, Haryana

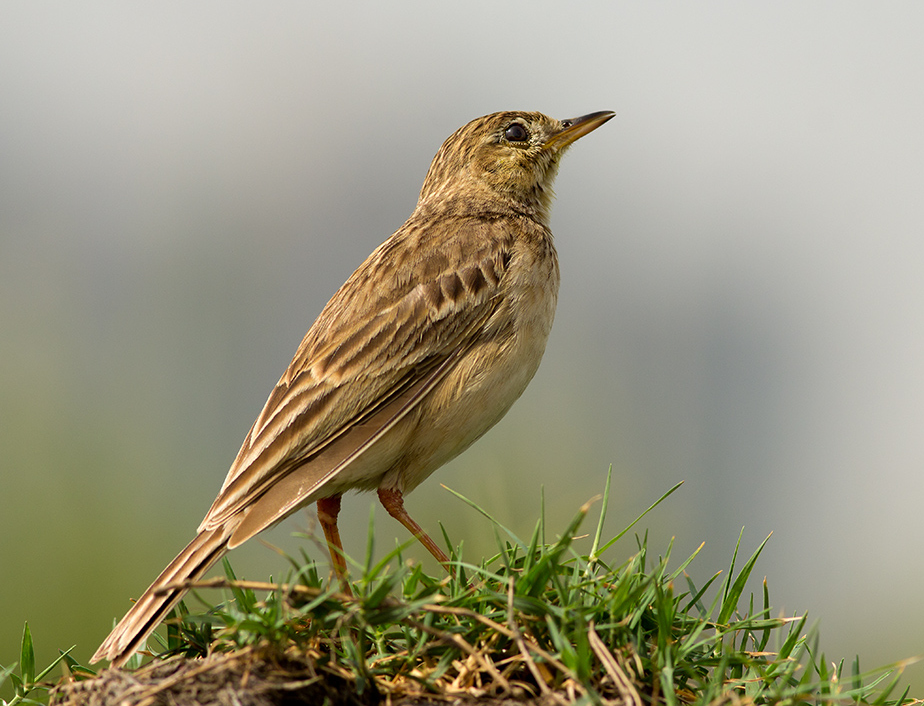
Paddyfield pipit, taken at Basai wetlands, Haryana

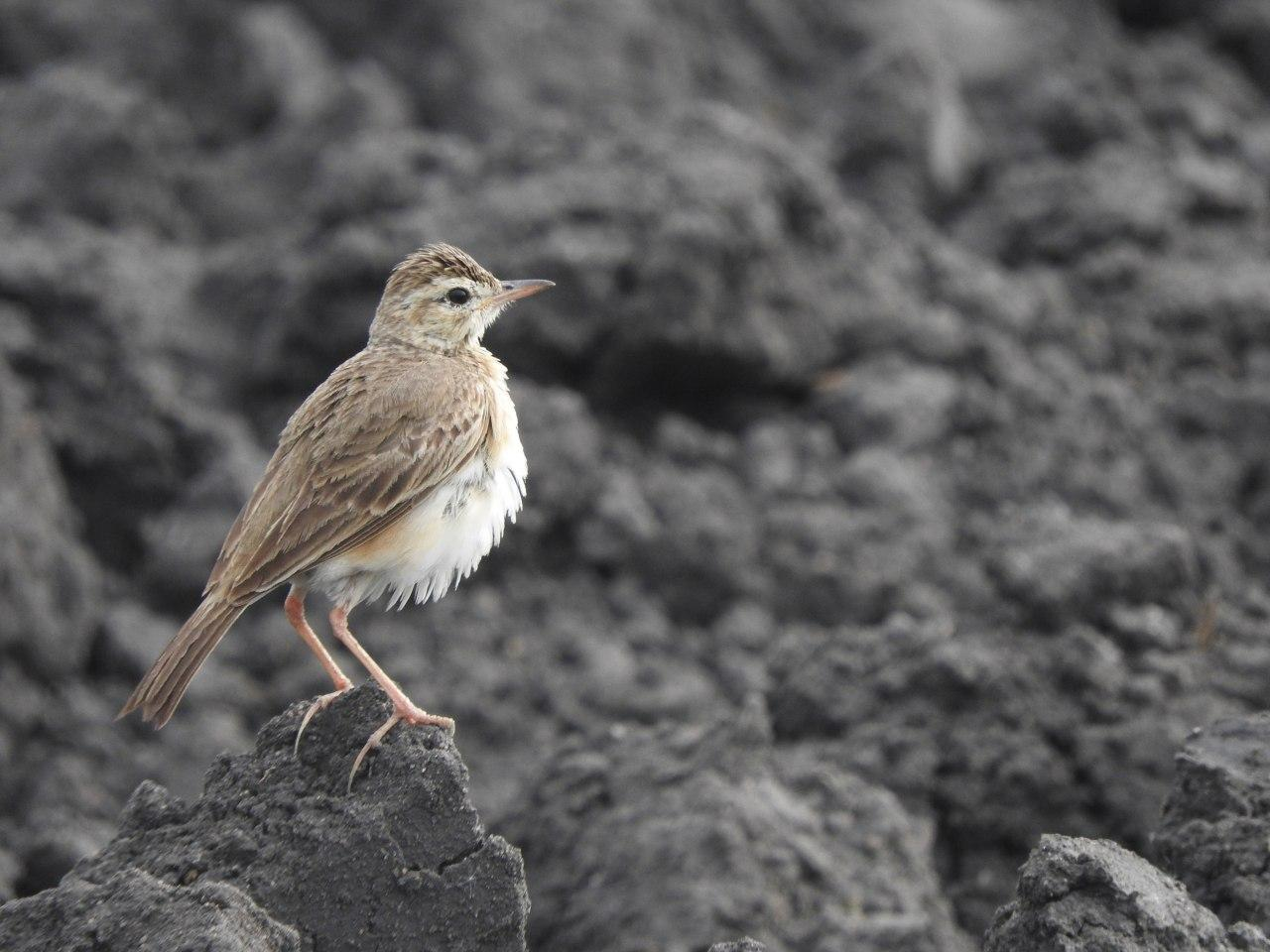
Paddyfield Pipit seen in Udumalpet, Tamil Nadu, India
