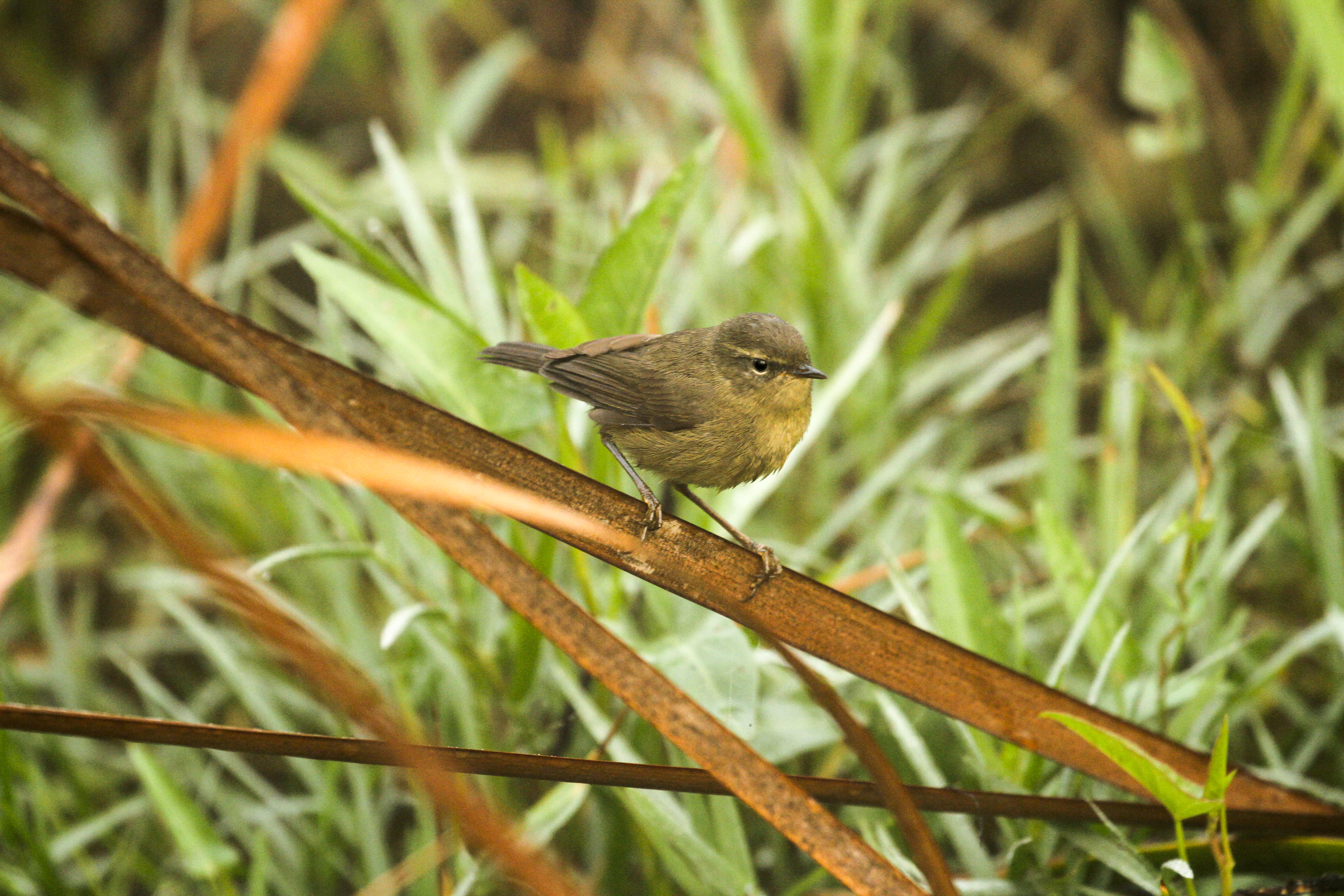

Conservation status
- Least Concern (IUCN 3.1)

Scientific classification
- Kingdom: Animalia
- Phylum: Chordata
- Class: Aves
- Order: Passeriformes
- Family: Phylloscopidae
- Genus: Phylloscopus
- Species: P. fuligiventer

Binomial name
- Phylloscopus fuligiventer (Hodgson, 1845)

= Smoky warbler =

Species of bird

The smoky warbler (Phylloscopus fuligiventer) is a species of Old World warbler in the family Phylloscopidae. It is found in the eastern Himalayas, the Tibetan Plateau, and as an occasional vagrant to Myanmar.
