= Pathrala barrage =

- Location within India
- Official name: Pathrala barrage
- Country: India
- Location: Yamunanagar district, Haryana
- Coordinates: 30°12′56″N 77°23′39″E
- Status: Operational
- Construction began: 1875
- Opening date: 1876; 150 years ago

Dam and spillways
- Type of dam: Embankment, earth-fill
- Impounds: Somb river and Western Yamuna Canal
- Height: 34 m (112 ft)
- Length: 460 m (1,510 ft)

Pathrala Barrage (Hindi: पथराला बांध) is a barrage across the Somb river, located in Yamuna Nagar District, in the state of Haryana, India.

== History ==
The Western Yamuna Canal, built in 1335 CE by Firuz Shah Tughlaq, excessive silting caused it to stop flowing in 1750 CE, British Raj] undertook a three-year renovation in 1817 by Bengal Engineer Group, in 1832-33 Tajewala Barrage dam at Yaumna was built to regulate the flow of water, in 1875-76 Pathrala barrage at Dadupur and Somb river dam downstream of canal were built, in 1889-95 the largest branch of the canal Sirsa branch was constructed, the modern Hathni Kund Barrage was built in 1999 to handle the problem of silting to replace the older Tajewala Barrage.

The Western Yamuna Canal begins at the Hathnikund Barrage about 38 kilometres (24 mi) from Dakpathar and south of Doon Valley. The canals irrigate vast tracts of land in the region in Ambala district, Karnal district, Sonepat district, Rohtak district, Jind district, Hisar district and Bhiwani district.

== See also ==
- Blue Bird Lake, Hisar (city)
- Kaushalya Dam in Pinjore
- Bhakra Dam
- Hathni Kund Barrage
- Okhla Barrage - Western Yamuna Canal begins here
- Surajkund
- Indira Gandhi Canal
- Irrigation in India
- Indian Rivers Inter-link
- Inland waterways of India
- Ganges Canal
- Ganges Canal (Rajasthan)
- Upper Ganges Canal Expressway
- List of lakes in India
- List of dams and reservoirs in Haryana
