= Munak canal =

Canal in India

Coordinates: 29.5203112°N 76.8400526°E

Munak Canal
- Interactive map of Munak Canal

Specifications
- Locks: Munak Barrage regulator, Khubru barrage and Mandora barrage

History
- Construction began: 2012

Geography
- Start point: Munak, Karnal, Haryana
- Branch of: Western Yamuna Canal

The Munak Canal is a 102 kilometer long aqueduct that is part of Western Yamuna Canal in Haryana and Delhi states in India. The canal conveys water from the Yamuna River at Munak regulator in Karnal district of Haryana and travels in a southerly direction via Khubru barrage and Mandora barrage, terminating at Haidarpur in Delhi. It is one of the primary sources of drinking water for Delhi. A memorandum of understanding was signed between the Haryana and Delhi governments in 1996 and the Canal was constructed by Haryana between 2003 and 2012 on payment by Delhi. Originally a porous trench, the canal was eventually cemented due to excess seepage, saving 80 million gallons of water per day.

To reduce loss due to evaporation a project to cover the canal in solar panels similar to the Canal Solar Power Project started in 2025.

In September 2025, the government of Delhi formally took over the maintenance of Munak Canal from Haryana. As part of the move, plans were announced to install railings along the length of the canal to prevent accidents like drownings, after repeated concerns about safety and neglect.

Simultaneously, authorities initiated a major cleanup operation, floating a tender to remove roughly 48,782 metric tonnes of silt and municipal waste along a contaminated stretch. This was part of a wider effort to remove the accumulated junk (estimated at ~500,000 metric tonnes over 25 km of canal banks) and restore the canal’s function and hygiene.

== Disruptions ==
In February 2016, the canal was disrupted by the Jats during their agitation, which led to a potential water crises in Delhi. The control of the canal was taken over by the Indian Army to restore the water supply.

== See also ==
- Indira Gandhi Canal
- Irrigation in India
- Indian Rivers Inter-link
- Inland waterways of India
- Ganges Canal
- Ganges Canal (Rajasthan)
- Upper Ganges Canal Expressway
- Blue Bird Lake, Hisar (city)
- Kaushalya Dam in Pinjore
- Bhakra Dam
- Hathni Kund Barrage
- Tajewala Barrage
- Okhla Barrage - Western Yamuna Canal begins here
- Surajkund
- Neher water system
