= Dhatrath =

Dhatrath Sarda
- Village
- Village of Dhatrath, Jind district, Haryana Dhatrath (India)
- Coordinates: 29.384638°N 76.4493013°E
- Country: India
- State: Haryana
- District: Jind district
- Elevation: 230 m (750 ft)

Languages
  - Official: Haryanvi, Hindi, Punjabi, Urdu and English
- Time zone: UTC+5:30 (IST)
- Telephone code: 01686
- ISO 3166 code: IN-HR
- Vehicle registration: HR
- Taluka: Pillukhera
- Distance from Chandigarh: 181 kilometres (112 mi)
- Distance from Jind: 19.1 kilometres (11.9 mi)
- Website: haryana.gov.in
- Pin Code : 126110; Post Office Name : Dhatrath, Pillukhera

Dhatrath is a village in Safidon, Jind district at Haryana, India. It belongs to Hisar Division . It is located 16 km (towards east) from Jind and about 180 km from state capital Chandigarh. Pin code is 126110. Dhatrath is a very old village and also known as Seharda (City Like).

The name Dhatrath is named after Dhritarashtr, the Kuru King of Hastinapur. In a popular folktale from Mahabharat that is considered that Dhritarashtr was on his way to Kurukshetra after Mahabharat and he asked his Charioteer to stop at the village.

There is a canal flow river besides the village known as Hansi Branch which is originated from Pashchim Yamuna Canal. The canal has been built on the route of old seasonal river named Chautang, that was a helping river of holy Sarswati. In Rig Veda of ancient time this river was also known as Drishdwati river.

11th Century famous saint Guru Gorakhnath's disciple Guru Kalainath had resounded his body at the village. His 'Samadhi' is there in the village which is called Kala Peer in popular culture. In 12-13th Saltanat Period Dhatrath has become an important city of Punjab as given by a research paper from Punjab University. As record told the Dhatrath was mentioned as a City in Tabaqat-e-Nisari (famous book) from where Kutubuddin Aibak was collecting tax. Firojashah Tugalaq connected the river with Yamuna. There was a Rest House or Small Fort in the village as record says that Sultan Mahommad Shah was attacked at Dhatrath on his route to Delhi by Khizr Khan, subordinate of Taimur Lang in 1408. After Second battle of Panipat when Akbar established his rule in Delhi, there are records of collecting tax from Dhatrath and also A Brick Fort was mentioned in Ain-E-Akbari at Dhatrath. The tax record continue upto Aurangzeb period.

In 1707 when Jind Princely State was former by Raja Gajpat Singh, Dhatrath was an important City along with Jind and Safidon.

== History ==
There are accounts of Khizr Khan sending forces to attack Dhatrath in around 800 AD. During Akbar's time it was under Hisar Sarkar and was one of the three mahals (along with Jind and Khanda) that were set up for purposes of revenue collection.

Village is named after King Dhritrashtra.

== Demographics ==
As per 2011 Census village population is 8,795 . Literacy rate is around 61%.

Haryanvi, a dialect of Hindi, is the most commonly spoken local Language here.

== Transport ==
Khunga, Jamni, Kheri Taloda, Kharak Gaidian, Bania Khera, Mohmed Khera, Raichandwala, Dilluaala and Mandi Khurd are the nearby Villages to Dhatrath.

Jind, Assandh, Safidon, Gohana are some of the nearby cities.

Pillu Khera Railway Station and Siwaha Railway Station are the nearby railway stations to Dhatrath. Jind Railway Jn is major railway station 25 km near to Dhatrath.The village is connected by State Highway 14 which runs between Jind and Panipat.

== Rivers ==
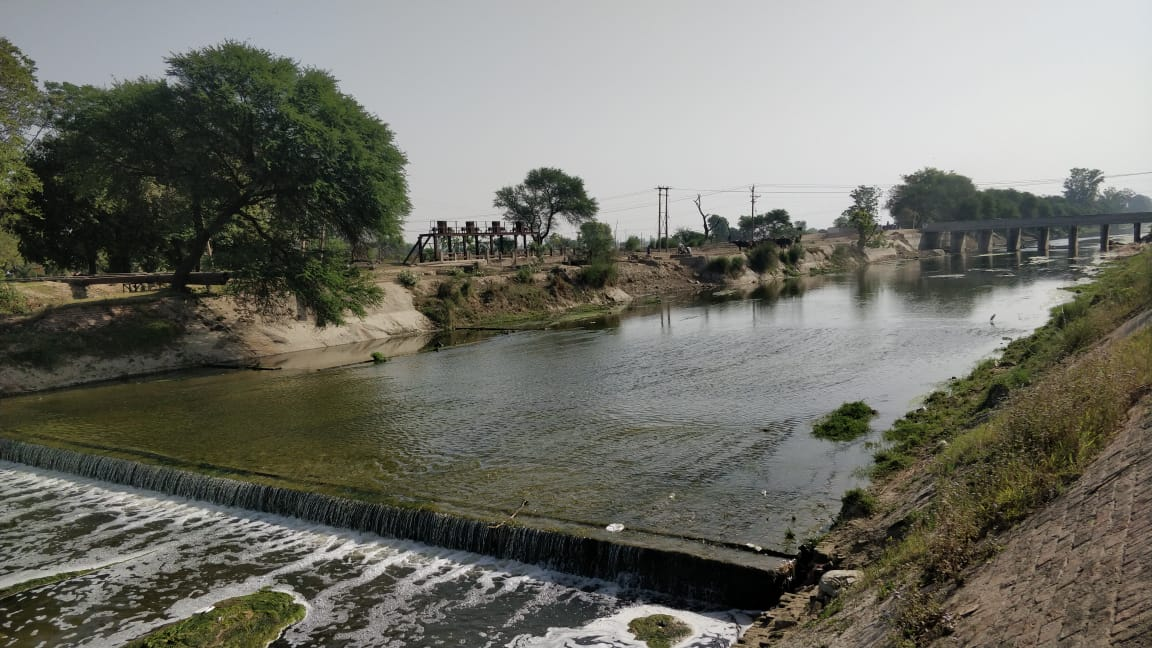
Old Chautang river which has been converted into Jind Hansi branch. Picture is taken near Dhatrath This branches away from Western Yamuna Canal near Munak

Jind Hansi Branch Canal passes south of the village and is main water tributary. This branches away from Western Yamuna Canal near Munak. This river existed since historical times and was known as Old Chautang river. This branch was built in the paleochannel of seasonal Chautang river which is a relict of Drishadvati river flowing from Kaithal to Hisar district, passing through the towns of Jind, Hansi, Hisar, largest Indus Valley Civilization site of Rakhigarhi and ancient Agroha Mound. Drishadvati River itself was a tributary of extinct Sarasvati River which stills flows in the forms of Ghaggar-Hakra River.

There is rajwaha on north side of Village and passes through Peer wala farms.
