= G. R. Blane =

East India Company employee (1791–1821)

- Born: George Rodney Blane; 1791
- Died: 1 May 1821 (aged 29–30)
- Education: Charterhouse School, Royal Military College, Marlow, Woolwich
- Occupations: Engineer, Military Officer
- Employer: East India Company
- Known for: Remodeling Western Yamuna Canal

G. R. Blane (1791–1821) was an employee of the East India Company in British India.

== Ancestry ==
George Rodney Blane was born in 1791 to Sir Gilbert Blane, and died aged 30 years on 1 May 1821.

== Education ==
Blane was educated at Charterhouse School, and in 1804 (aged 13 years) he joined the Royal Military College, Marlow as a cadet of the East India Company.

== Career at East India Company ==
He had joined the department of line but due to his excellence in mathematics he was transferred to the ordinance department where he attracted the positive attention of Prime Minister William Pitt the Younger. After completing his education at Woolwich in 1807, aged 16 years he arrived in India to serve in the Bengal Engineers, part of the East India Company’s Bengal Army and predecessors of the Indian Army Corps of Engineers Bengal Engineer Group. He surveyed Cuttack, Nepal, foothills of Himalaya and he desilted and remodeled Western Yamuna Canal. His assistant 1820-1821 was Ensign Edmund Swetenham of the Bengal Engineers.

== Western Yamuna Canal ==
The earlier Prithviraj Chauhan era or possibly earlier, pre-existing canal was dug out and renovated in 1335 CE by Firuz Shah Tughlaq, excessive silting caused it to stop flowing in 1750 CE, the British Raj undertook a three-year renovation and remodeling of Western Yamuna Canal in 1817 by Blane or Bengal Engineer Group, he died in 1821 CE and in 1832-33 Tajewala Barrage dam at Yaumna was built to regulate the flow of water.

== See also ==
- Indira Gandhi Canal
- Irrigation in India
- Indian Rivers Inter-link
- Inland waterways of India
- Ganges Canal
- Ganges Canal (Rajasthan)
- Upper Ganges Canal Expressway
