= Western Yamuna Canal =

Canal in India

History
- Former names: Old Mughal Canal
- Original owner: Bengal Engineer Group
- Principal engineer: GR Blane
- Other engineer: Mr. Rennie
- Date restored: 1817

Geography
- Start point: Tajewala Barrage, YamunaNagar (originally Hathni Kund Barrage) (New Tajewal barrage was built to handle the problem of excessive silting)
- Branches: Sirsa branch, Hansi branch, Butana Branch, Sunder Branch, Jind branch, Munak Canal, Delhi Branch
- Branch of: Yamuna river

Western Yamuna Canal is canal in river Yamuna that was dug out and renovated in 1335 CE by Firoz Shah Tughlaq. In 1750 CE, excessive silting caused it to stop flowing. The British Raj undertook a three-year renovation in 1817 by Captain GR Blane of the Bengal Engineer Group. In 1832-33 Tajewala Barrage dam at Yamunanagar was also built to regulate the flow of water, and later Pathrala barrage at Dadupur, Yamuna Nagar and Somb river dam downstream of canal were constructed in 1875-76. In 1889-95 the largest branch of the canal Sirsa branch was constructed. The modern Hathni Kund Barrage was built in 1999 to handle the problem of silting to replace the older Tajewala Barrage.

Once it passes Delhi, the yamuna river feeds the Agra Canal built in 1874, which starts from Okhla barrage beyond the Nizamuddin bridge, and the high land between the Khari-Nadi and the Yamuna and before joining the Banganga river about 32 kilometres (20 mi) below Agra. Thus, during the summer season, the stretch above Agra resembles a minor stream.

== Hydel Power ==
The Western Yamuna Canal has several major barrages and dams, including Hathni Kund Barrage, Tajewala Barrage, Pathrala barrage at Dadupur and Somb river dam, some of which are also used for the hydel power generation.

== Western Yamuna Command area ==
The Western Yamuna Canal begins at the Hathnikund Barrage about 38 kilometres (24 mi) from Dakpathar and south of Doon Valley.

The canals irrigate vast tracts of land in the region in Ambala district, Karnal district, Sonepat district, Rohtak district, Jind district, Hisar district and Bhiwani district.

== Western Yamuna Command Network ==
The 86 km long main canal has the total length of 325 km not including its branches such as Sirsa branch, Hansi branch, Butana branch, Sunder branch, Delhi branch, along with hundreds of major and minor irrigation channels which are also breeding grounds for many species of birds.

=== Munak Canal ===
The Munak canal, is a 102 kilometer long aqueduct in Haryana and Delhi states in India. The canal conveys water from the Yamuna River at Munak, Karnal district, Haryana and travels in a southerly direction, terminating at Haidarpur, Delhi. It is one of the primary sources of drinking water for Delhi. A memorandum of understanding was signed between the Haryana and Delhi governments in 1996 and the Canal was constructed by Haryana between 2003 and 2012 on payment by Delhi. Originally a porous trench, the canal was eventually cemented due to excess seepage, saving 80 million gallons of water per day.

==== Delhi Branch ====
The portion of Munak canal is also called Delhi Branch, 22 km canal was built in 1819, and renovated in 2008, originates at Munak village in Gharaunda tehsil of Karnal district is a branch of Western Yaumna Canal to bring 700 cusecs water to Delhi.

==== Bhalaut Branch ====
The Bhalaut Branch, originating at Khubru village, is a sub-branch of Delhi branch of Western Yaumna Canal that flows through Jhajjar district.

==== Jhajjar Branch ====
The Jhajjar Branch is a sub-branch of Bhalaut branch of Western Yaumna Canal that flows through Jhajjar district.

=== Sirsa Branch ===
The Sirsa Branch, built in 1896 and originating at Indri, is a sub-branch of Sirsa branch of Western Yaumna Canal which menders through Kaithal district, Jind district, Fatehabad district and Sirsa district.

==== Jind Branch ====
The Jind Branch is a branch of Western Yaumna Canal which menders through Jind district.

==== Barwala Branch ====
The Barwala Branch is a sub-branch of Sirsa branch of Western Yaumna Canal. It meanders through Barwala tehsil of Hisar district.

=== Hansi Branch ===
The Hansi Branch, built in 1825 and remodeled in 1959, originating at Munak canal at Munak village in Gharaunda tehsil of Karnal district is a branch of Western Yaumna Canal that meanders through Hansi tehsil of Hisar district.

This branch was built in the paleochannel of seasonal Chautang river which is a relict of Drishadvati river flowing from Kaithal to Hisar district, passing through the towns of Jind, Hansi, Hisar, largest Indus Valley civilization site of Rakhigarhi and ancient Agroha Mound. Drishadvati river itself was a tributary of extinct Sarasvati River which stills flows in the forms of Ghaggar-Hakra River.

==== Butana sub-branch ====
The Butana Branch is a sub-branch of Western Yaumna Canal's Hansi Branch that meanders through Hansi tehsil of Hisar district.

===== Sunder distributory =====
The Sunder Branch of Western Yamuna Canal is a sub-branch of Butana branch of Hansi branch and goes to Kanwari and beyond in Hisar (district).

===== Bhiwani Branch =====
The Bhiwani Branch, built in 1985, is a sub-branch of Western Yaumna Canal that meanders through Bhiwani district.

=== Rohtak Branch ===
The Rohtak Branch is a sub-branch of Jind branch of Western Yaumna Canal and it meanders through Rohtak district.

=== Jawahar Lal Nehru Lift Irrigation Project ===
Jawahar Lal Nehru Lift Irrigation Projectfor bringing water from Khubaru to 1st Lift Station JF-1 at Akedi Madanpur up to JF-2 at Salawas Rewari. Therefrom water is lifted for Mahendergarh Canal taking water to Mahendragarh districts of South and South Western Haryana.Lift Irrigation, was approved by the {panning Commission in 1976 as part of the 5th Five-Year Plan and completed during the 7th Five-Year Plan (1985–1990) at a cost of INR 40.30 crore with a command area of 249,900 hectares and irrigation potential of 154,640 hectares. It Forks off as the Salhawas Channel from the Loharu Feeder Canal of the Western Yamuna Canal.The original design capacity of the JLN Canal, which is basically a feeder canal has been 3241 Cusec which was revised to 3541 cusec to accommodate water requirement of two power plants in the region. However the canal operation could never cross 2400 cusec. Chief Engineer Satbir Singh Kadian, an IITian studied the canal afresh in September 2016 and after some engineering, the canal capacity was restored. JLN Feeder Canal has been successfully running at full, original design, capacity of 3250 cusec since 2017. This has increased crop area in Loharu, Narnaul, Mahendergarh, Charkhi Dadari and Rewari areas besides improving the water table in the region.

Project has the following distributaries and minors:

- Dewana distributary
- Gehli Distributary
- Hasanpur distributary
- Laduwas distributary
- Madogarh Distributary
- Narnaul Distributary
- Nolpur distributary
- Rasauli distributary
- Shahbazpur distributary
- Alipur Minor
- Ateli Monor
- Dhancholi Minor
- Gopal Minor
- Jawahar Lal Nehru Canal
- Khamania Minor
- Kheri Minor

Lal Bahadur Shastri Channel

- Salhawas Minor

== Sutlej Yamuna Link Canal ==
Sutlej Yamuna Link Canal (SARYU) or SYL as it is popularly known, is a proposed 214-kilometer (133 mi) long canal in India, construction of which is on hold due to the legal disputes, to connect the Sutlej and Yamuna rivers.

However, the proposal met obstacles and was referred to the Supreme Court of India. It defines river water sharing between Punjab & Haryana states.

== See also ==
- Indira Gandhi Canal
- Irrigation in India
- Indian Rivers Inter-link
- Inland waterways of India
- Ganges Canal
- Ganges Canal (Rajasthan)
- Kaushalya Dam in Pinjore
- Bhakra Dam
- Hathni Kund Barrage
- Tajewala Barrage
- Okhla Barrage - Western Yamuna Canal begins here
- Surajkund
