= Somb River =

Somb river Som river
- Native name: सोम नदी (Hindi)

Location
- Country: India

Physical characteristics
- Source
  - location: Shivalik Hills, Sirmaur, Himachal Pradesh
- Length: 40 km (25 mi)
- Discharge
  - location: Pathrala barrage at Western Yamuna Canal in Haryana

Basin features
- Tributaries
  - left: Pathrala river (Bali Nadi)
- Waterbodies: Dadupur barrage

The Somb river, also spelled Som river (Hindi: सोम नदी) is a tributary of the Yamuna in Haryana state of India.

== Origin and route ==
The Somb river originates in the Shivalik hills near Adi Badri (Haryana) in Yamunanagar district on Haryana's border with Himachal Pradesh State.

In 1875-76 Pathrala barrage at Dadupur was built where Somb river meets Western Yamuna Canal in Haryana.

The basin is classified in two parts, Khadir and Bangar, the higher area that is not flooded in the rainy season is called Bangar and the lower flood-prone area is called Khadar.

== Irrigation and Hydal Power ==
The Western Yamuna Canal has several check dams in Yamunanagar district and hydal power is generated at Pathrala barrage. some of which are also used for the hydel power generation.

== Identification with Vedic rivers ==
The Somb river passing through here is considered by some to follow the course of the Rig Vedic Sarasvati river.

== Gallery ==
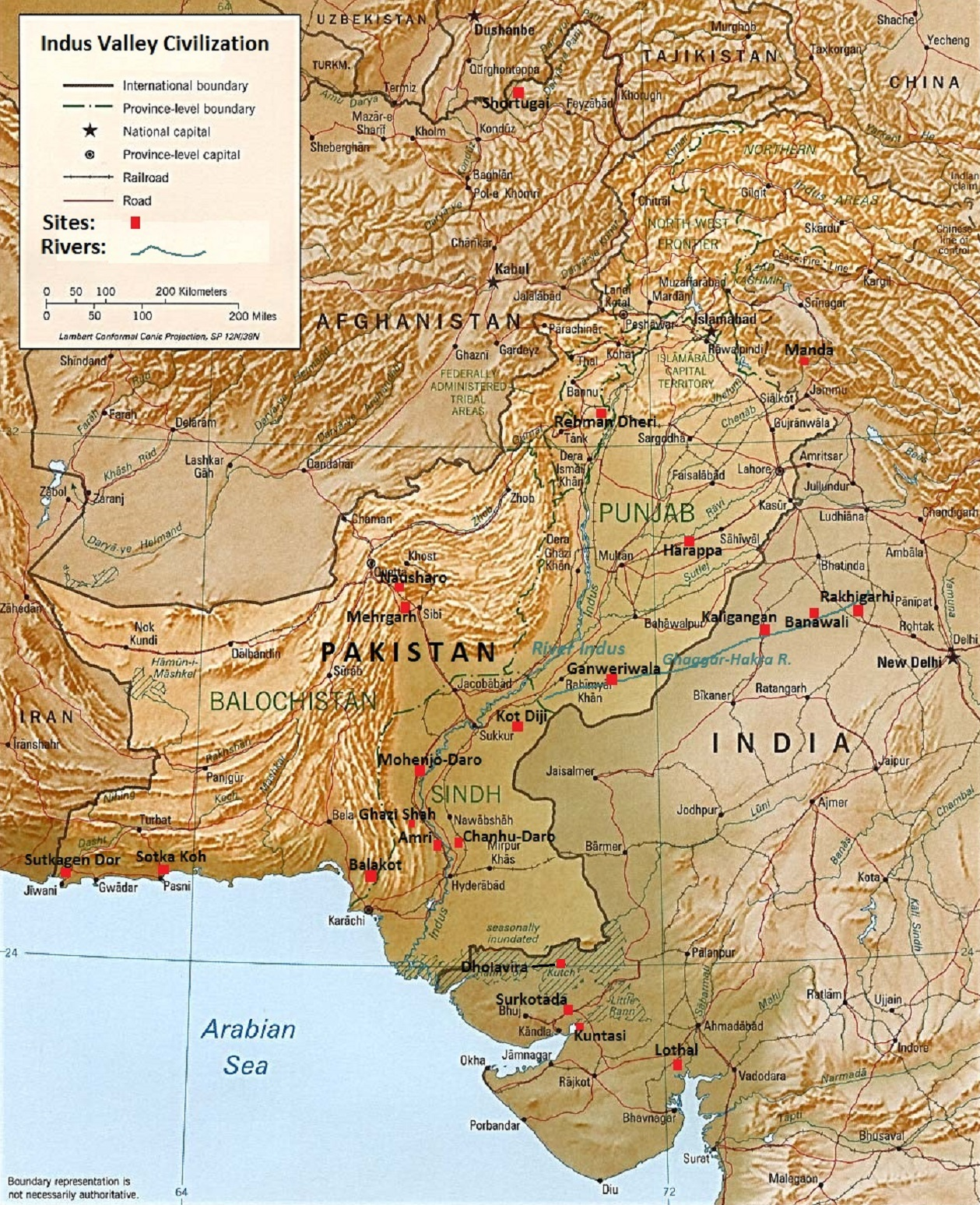
Indus–Sarasvati civilisation major sites

== See also ==
- Dangri, a tributary of Sarsuti, merge if Dangri and Tangri are same
- Sarsuti, a tributary of Ghaggar-Hakra River
- Kaushalya river, a tributary of Ghaggar-Hakra River
- Markanda river, Haryana, a tributary of Ghaggar-Hakra River
- Chautang, a tributary of Ghaggar-Hakra River
- Sutlej, a tributary of Indus
- Ganges
- Indus
- Western Yamuna Canal, branches off Yamuna

== Sources ==
- Erdosy, George, ed. (1995), The Indo-Aryans of Ancient South Asia: Language, Material Culture and Ethnicity, Walter de Gruyter, ISBN 978-3-11-014447-5
