= Sirsa branch =

Coordinates: 29.5203112°N 76.8400526°E

Sirsa Branch Canal

Specifications
- Locks: Near Pundri

History
- Construction began: 1896

Geography
- Start point: Indri, Karnal, Haryana
- Branch of: Western Yamuna Canal

The Sirsa Branch, built in 1896 and originating at Indri, is a sub-branch of Sirsa branch of Western Yaumna Canal which menders through Kaithal district, Jind district, Fatehabad district and Sirsa district.
