= Western Jamuna Canal Link =

Western Jamuna Canal Link also known as W.J.C. Link Channel is a canal that emerges from the Yamuna River at the Hathnikund Barrage near the Haryana-U.P border in Yamuna Nagar District of Haryana. The link channel meets the old W.J.C at a distance of 3895 m downstream of the Hathnikund barrage. The side slopes of the channel are 1.5:1 with the water surface slope of 0.15 per thousand for the first 900 m and then 0.4 per thousand up to 3895 m. Hathnikund barrage diverts 66% of the water from the Yamuna River to the channel. The discharge in the channel is 25,000 cubic feet per second (710 m^{3}/s) up to 900 m and then it is 14,300–20,000 cu ft/s (400–570 m^{3}/s) up to the end of the link channel. The bed width of the channel is 70 m throughout. The velocity of flow up to 900 m is 1.95 m/s and then it gets reduced to 1.4 m/s.
