= Kaushalya River =

River tributary in India

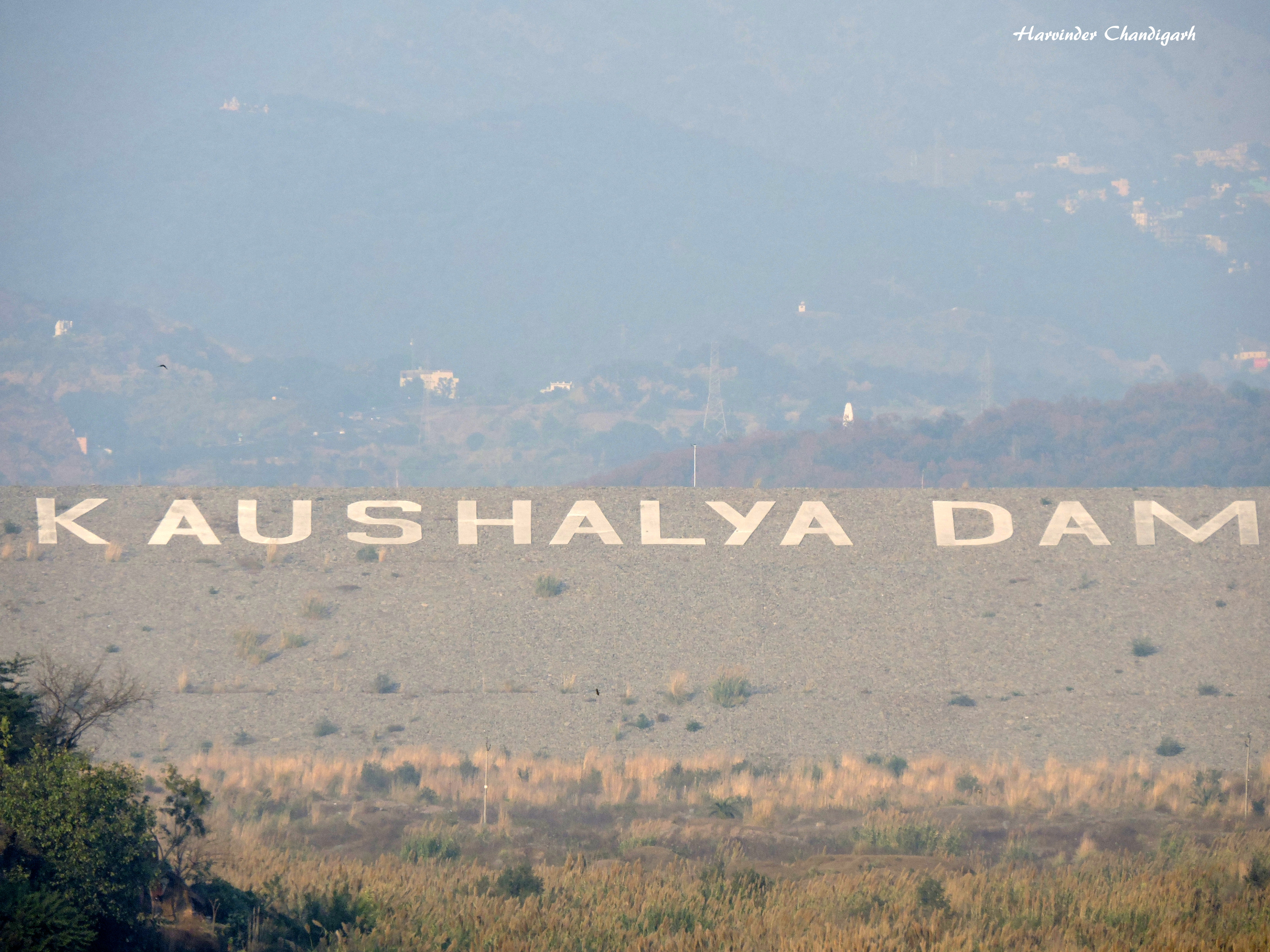
- Kaushalya dam near Pinjore

Location
- Country: India

Physical characteristics
- Source
  - location: Shivalik Hills, Himachal Pradesh
- Mouth
  - location: Panchkula district, Haryana
- Length: 20 km (12 mi)
- Discharge
  - location: Ghaggar river just south-east of Pinjore

Basin features
- Waterbodies: Kaushalya Dam
- Bridges: Kaushalya bridge

The Kaushalya river, a tributary of Ghaggar river, is a river in Panchkula district of Haryana state of India.

== Origin and route ==
The Kaushalya river rises in the Shivalik hills on the border of Haryana and Himachal Pradesh State, and flows through Panchkula district and converges with Ghaggar river near Pinjore just downstream of Kaushalya Dam.

The basin is classified in two parts, Khadir and Bangar, the higher area that is not flooded in rainy season is called Bangar and the lower flood-prone area is called Khadar.

Several archaeologists have identified the old Ghaggar-Hakra River with the Sarasvati river, on the banks of which the Indus Valley civilisation developed.

== Gallery ==
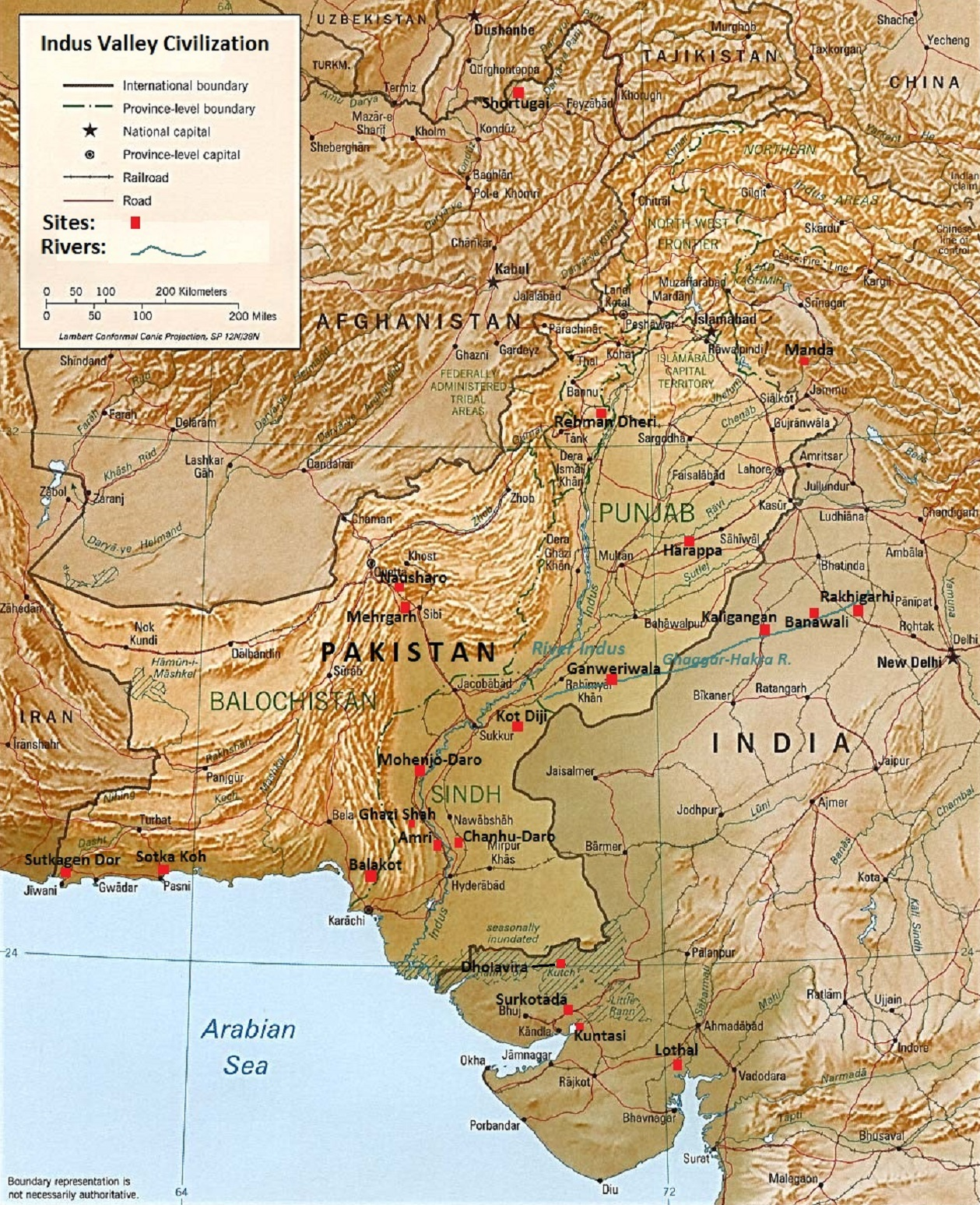
Indus–Sarasvati civilisation major sites

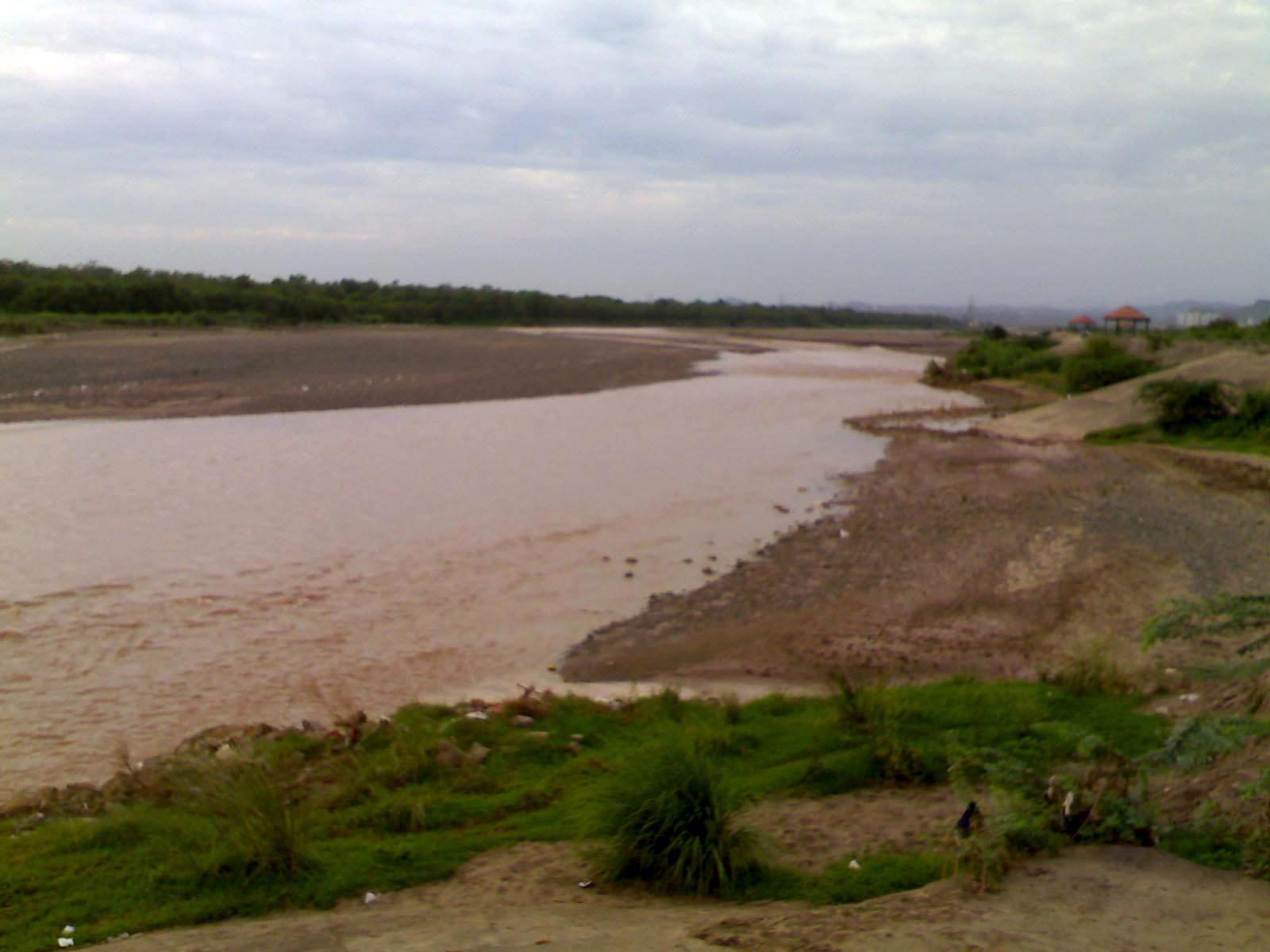
Ghaggar river flowing through Panchkula in Haryana

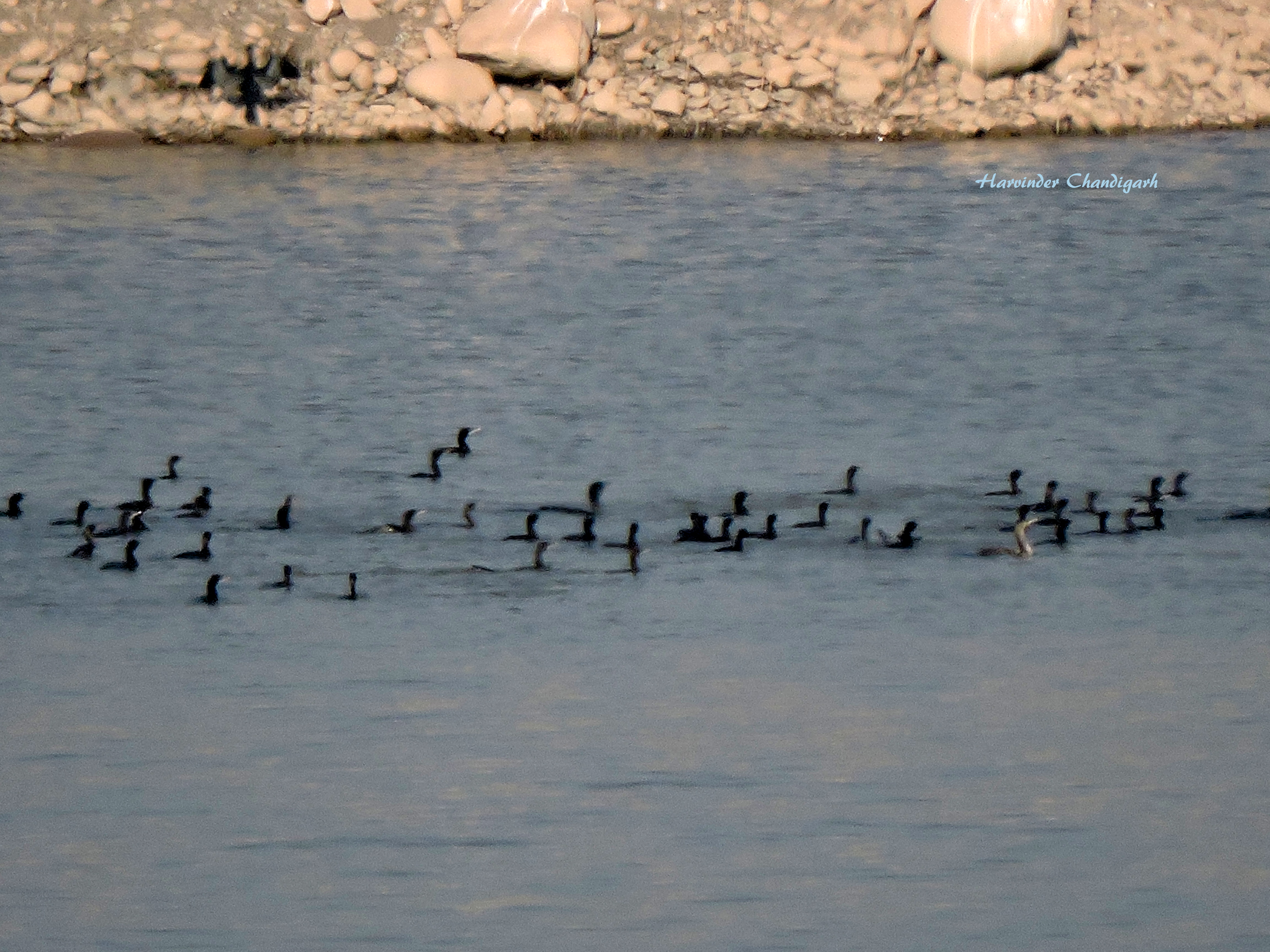
Flock of Cormorants at Kaushalya Dam

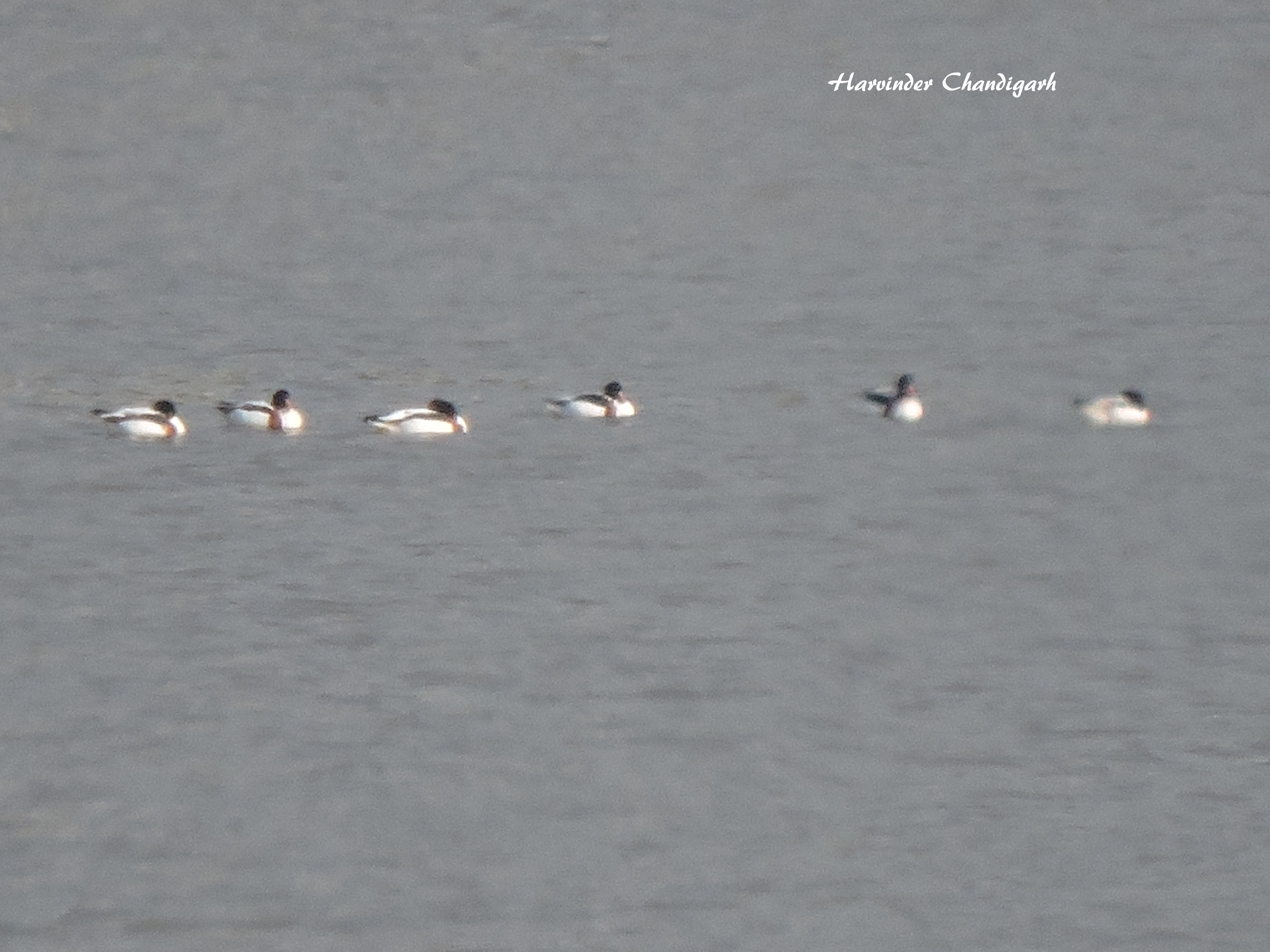
Migratory birds at Kaushalya Dam, near Pinjore, Haryana (Dec. 2015)

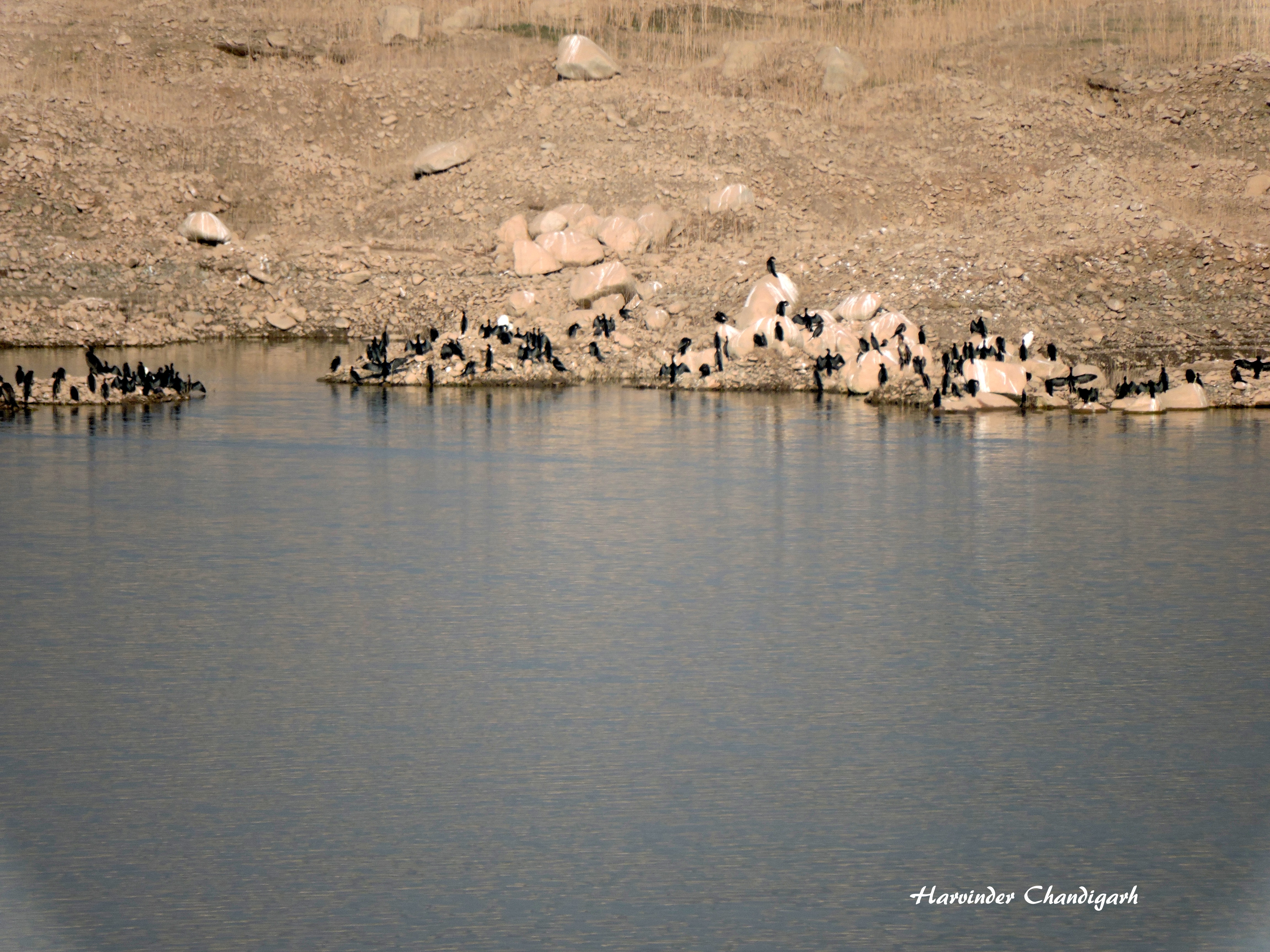
Migratory birds at Kaushalya Dam, near Pinjore, Panchkula district (Dec. 2015)

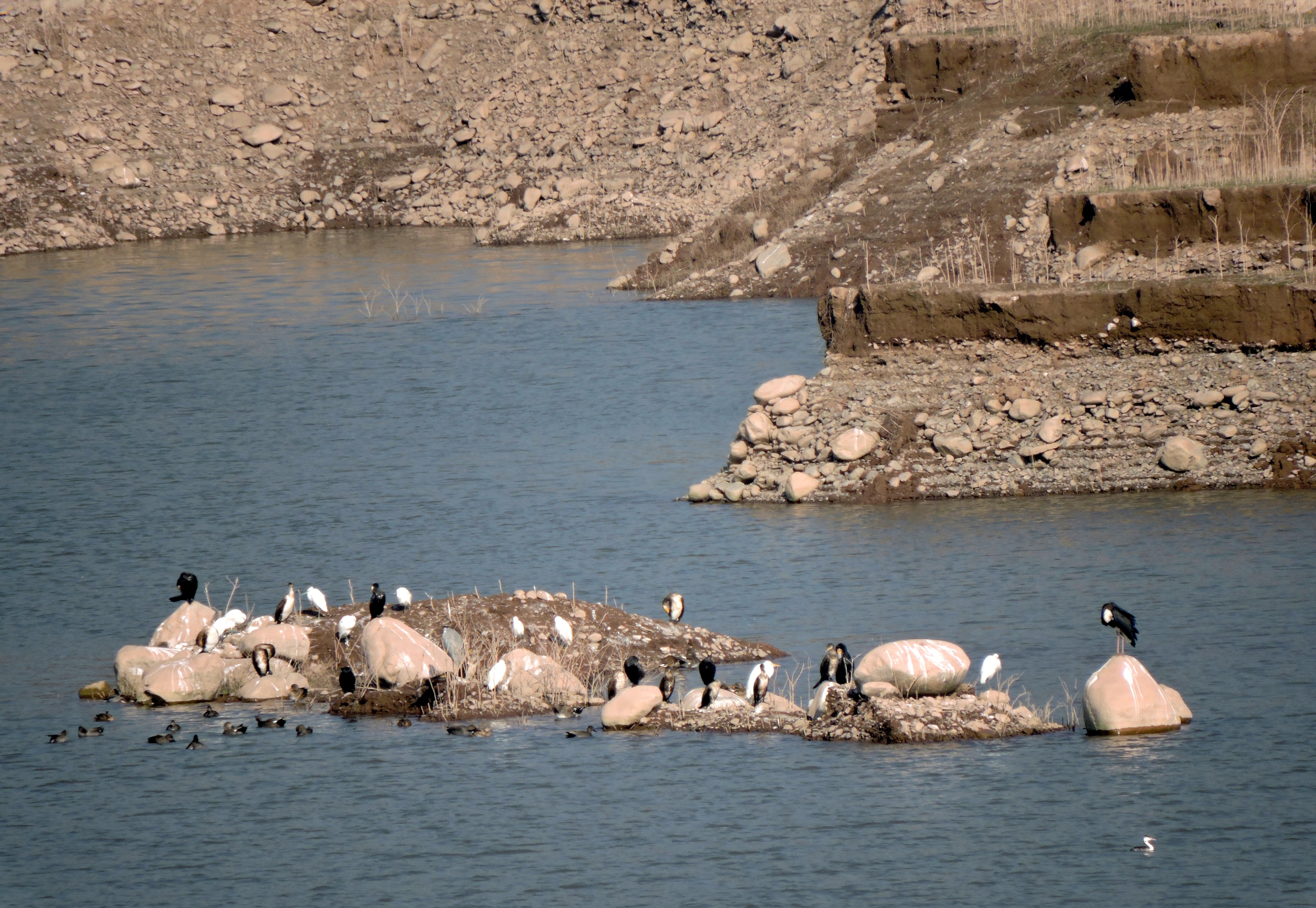
Migratory birds at Kaushalya Dam (Dec. 2015)

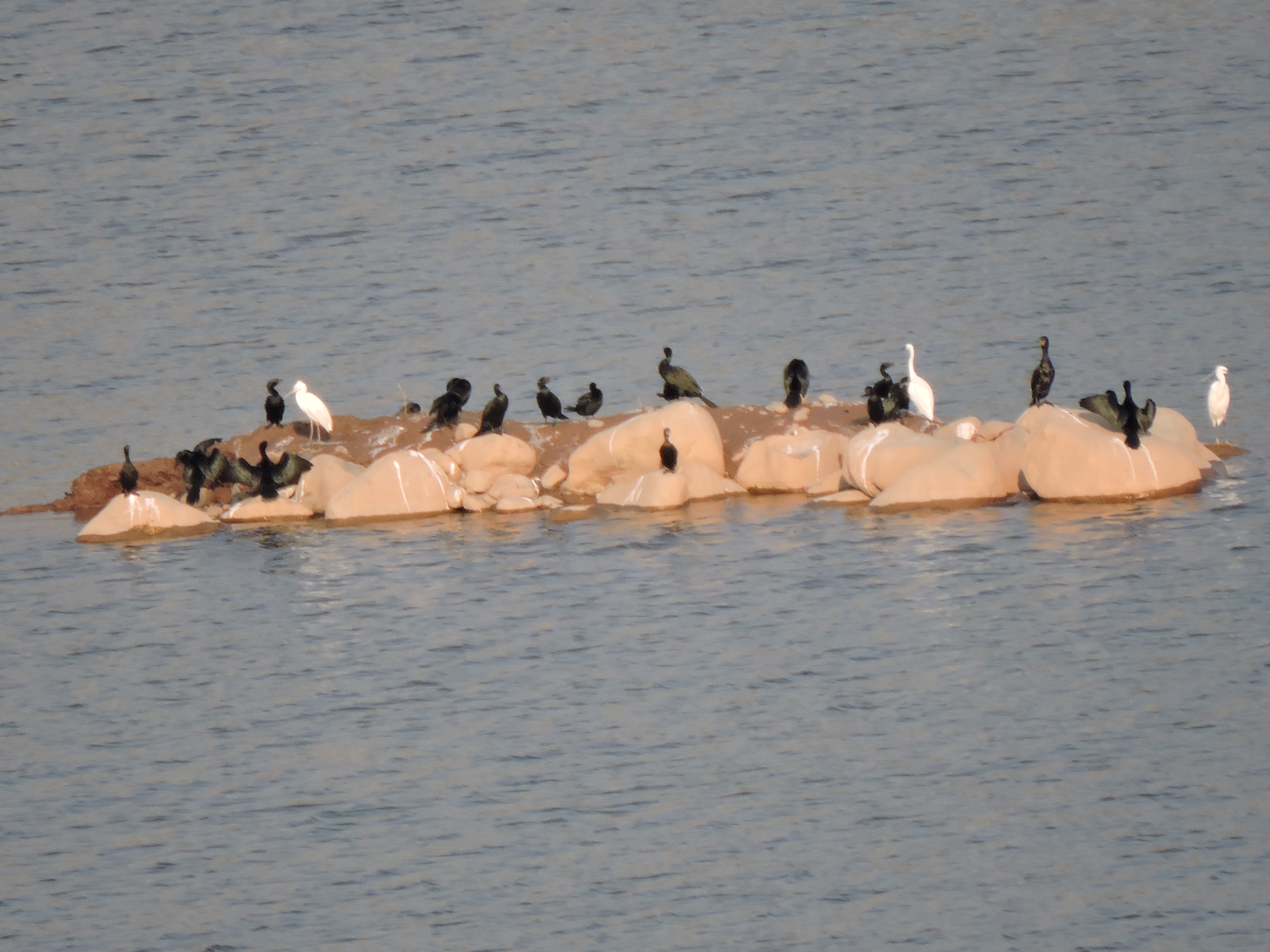
Water of Kaushalya Dam attracts local and migratory birds (June 2015)

== See also ==
- Western Yamuna Canal, branches off Yamuna
- Dangri, a tributary of Sarsuti
- Tangri river, a tributary of Sarsuti, merge if Dangri and Tangri are same
- Markanda river, a tributary of Ghaggar-Hakra River
- Sarsuti, a tributary of Ghaggar-Hakra River
- Chautang, a tributary of Ghaggar-Hakra River
- Sutlej, a tributary of Indus
- Ganges
- Indus
