= Munak, Karnal =

Munak
- village
- Location in Haryana, India Munak (India)
- Country: India
- State: Haryana
- District: Karnal
- Founder: Rajputs(Muslim rajput)

Government
  - Type: MC

Area
  - Total: 4 km^{2} (1.5 sq mi)
- Elevation: 4,000 m (13,000 ft)

Population (2020)
  - Total: 20,000
  - Density: 5,000/km^{2} (13,000/sq mi)

Haryanvi, hindi and Punjabi
  - Official: Haryanvi, hindi and Punjabi
- Time zone: UTC+5:30 (IST)
- Postal code: 132040
- Telephone code: +91-01749-XXXXXX
- Vehicle registration: HR-05
- Sex Ratio: 955:1000 ♂/♀
- Website: haryana.gov.in

Munak and adjacent Kheri Munak is a village and development block in Assandh sub-district of Karnal district, Haryana, India. Munak canal, which diverts Western Yamuna Canal's water to New Delhi, originates here at Munak regulator.

== History ==
Munak Canal was constructed in British Raj, Canal Rest house also constructed in British Raj and is still in very good condition. The rest house is maintaining by the Irrigation Department of Haryana. Munak canal was re-constructed here from 2003 to 2012.

The village was the subject of a video showing its historical beauty.

It was upgraded to a block in October 2016 by the Chief Minister Manohar Lal Khattar's administration.

== Demography ==
It has a population 20,000 people in 3500 households, as per 2011 census of India

Maharana Pratap Stadium is situated in Munak Village where the children of Munak Village play as well as prepare for the army.

== Education ==
Maharana Pratap Horticultural University, Karnal is located at Anjanthali near Munak.

Govt. senior secondary school, Munak

Govt. primary school, Munak

Govt. girls high school, Munak

Bharat public school, Munak

Maharana Pratap public school, Munak

Maa vashno international school, Munak

Aryakulam international school
