= Kaushalya Dam =

Dam in Pinjore, India

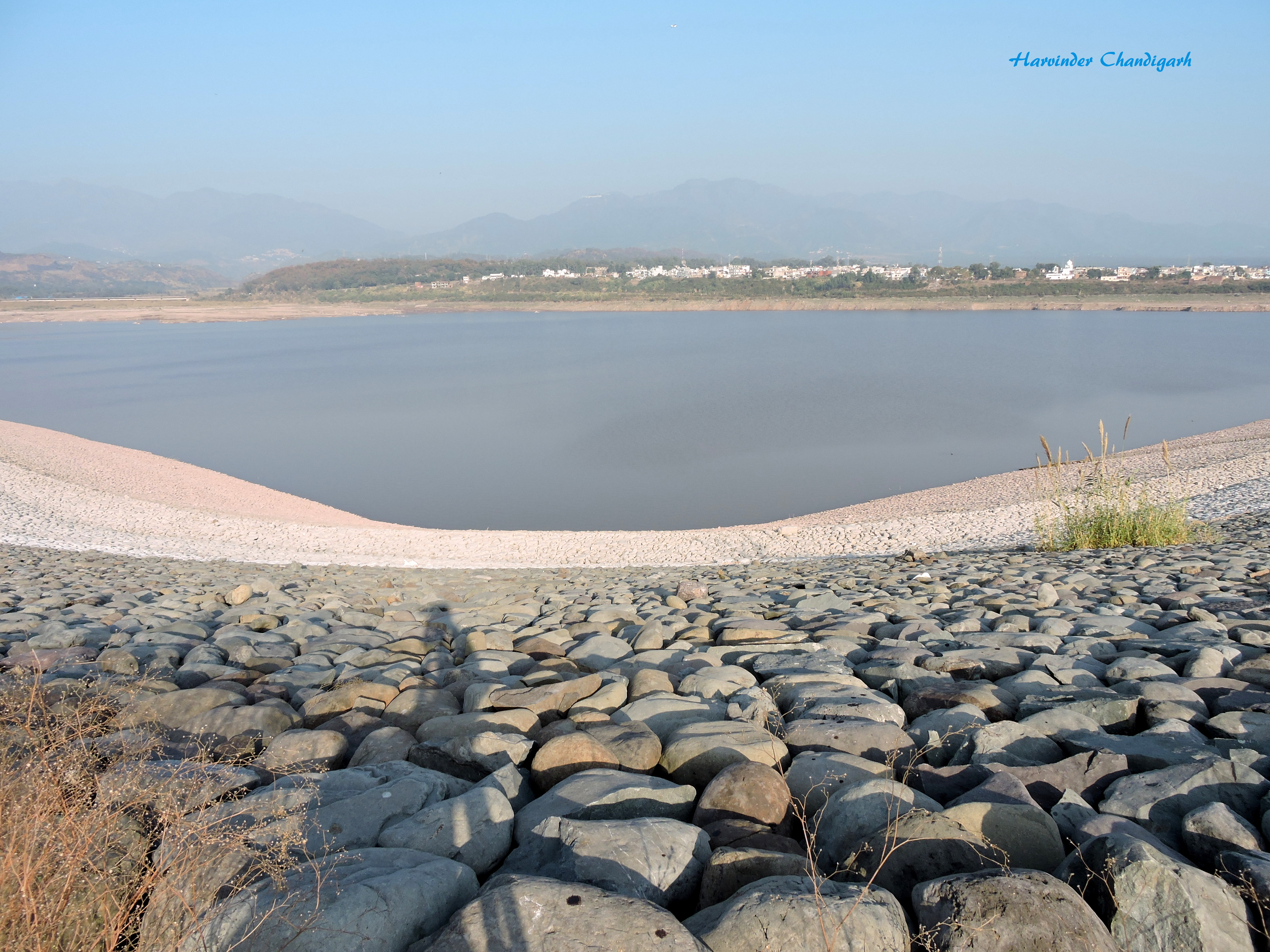
- Kaushalya Dam

- Location within India
- Official name: Kaushalya Dam
- Country: India
- Location: Pinjore, Haryana
- Coordinates: 30°46′30″N 76°54′50″E
- Status: Operational
- Construction began: 2008
- Opening date: 2012; 14 years ago

Dam and spillways
- Type of dam: Embankment, earth-fill
- Impounds: Kaushalya river
- Height: 34 m (112 ft)
- Length: 700 m (2,300 ft)

The Kaushalya Dam (Hindi: कौशल्या बांध) is an earth-fill embankment dam on the Kaushalya river, which is a tributary of Ghaggar-Hakra River (modern remnant of ancient Sarasvati river), in Pinjore of Haryana state, India. It was constructed between 2008 and 2012 with the primary purpose of water supply.

== Location ==
Kaushalya barrage and resulting upstream dam on Kaushalya river are located 21 km from Chandigarh, 12 km from Panchkula city and Khol Hi-Raitan Wildlife Sanctuary near Panchkula, 5 km from Pinjore city, and 13 km from Bir Shikargah Wildlife Sanctuary near Pinjore.

== History ==
The first plan, which never materialised, for a dam on Ghaggar river was first proposed by the British Raj in the mid 19th century to provide drinking water to Ambala Cantonment.

The proposal was revisited only in the 1960s to construct a dam on Ghaggar river at Gumthala near Chandimandir to provide water to Chandigarh and control floods in Punjab, India, this plan was abandoned in 1999 as it would have submerged over 4,000 acres (1,600 ha) of land resulting in relocation of a large number of people.

In 2005, the revised plan to build series of smaller dams on the tributaries of Ghaggar river was approved by the Government of Haryana and the construction of the Kaushalya dam commenced in 2008 which was completed in 2012.

In 2023, during the North India floods, the dam's gates were opened to release 4000 cusecs of water.

== Construction and cost ==
Kaushalya dam, built by the Government of Haryana, is a 700 meters (2,300 ft) long and 34 meters (112 ft) high earth-filled dam. The project was approved in December 2005 by the Haryana Government at the cost of Rs 51.37 crore .

== Wildlife ==
It is an important wetland and is the home to many endangered migratory birds.

== Gallery ==
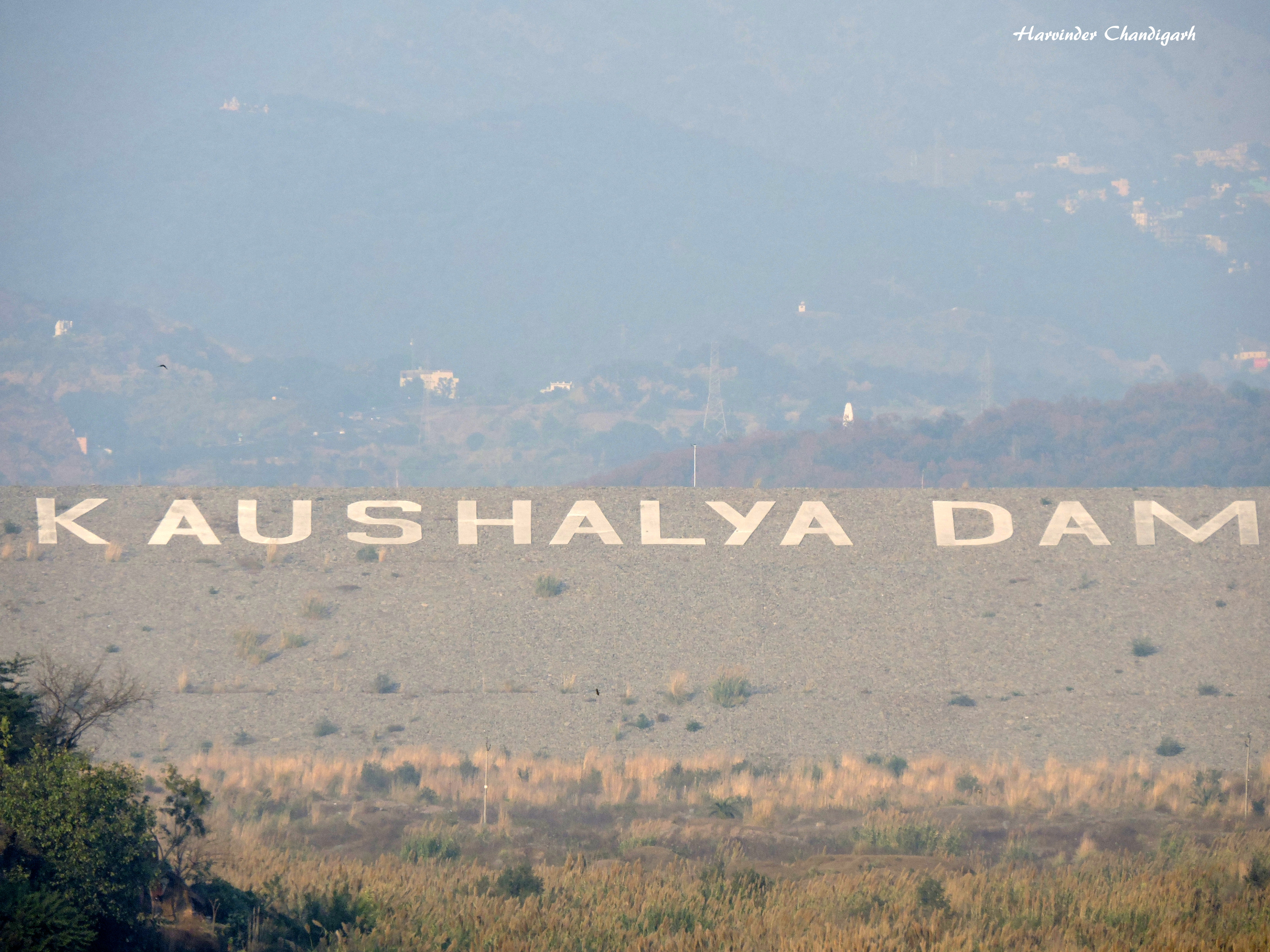
Kaushalya dam

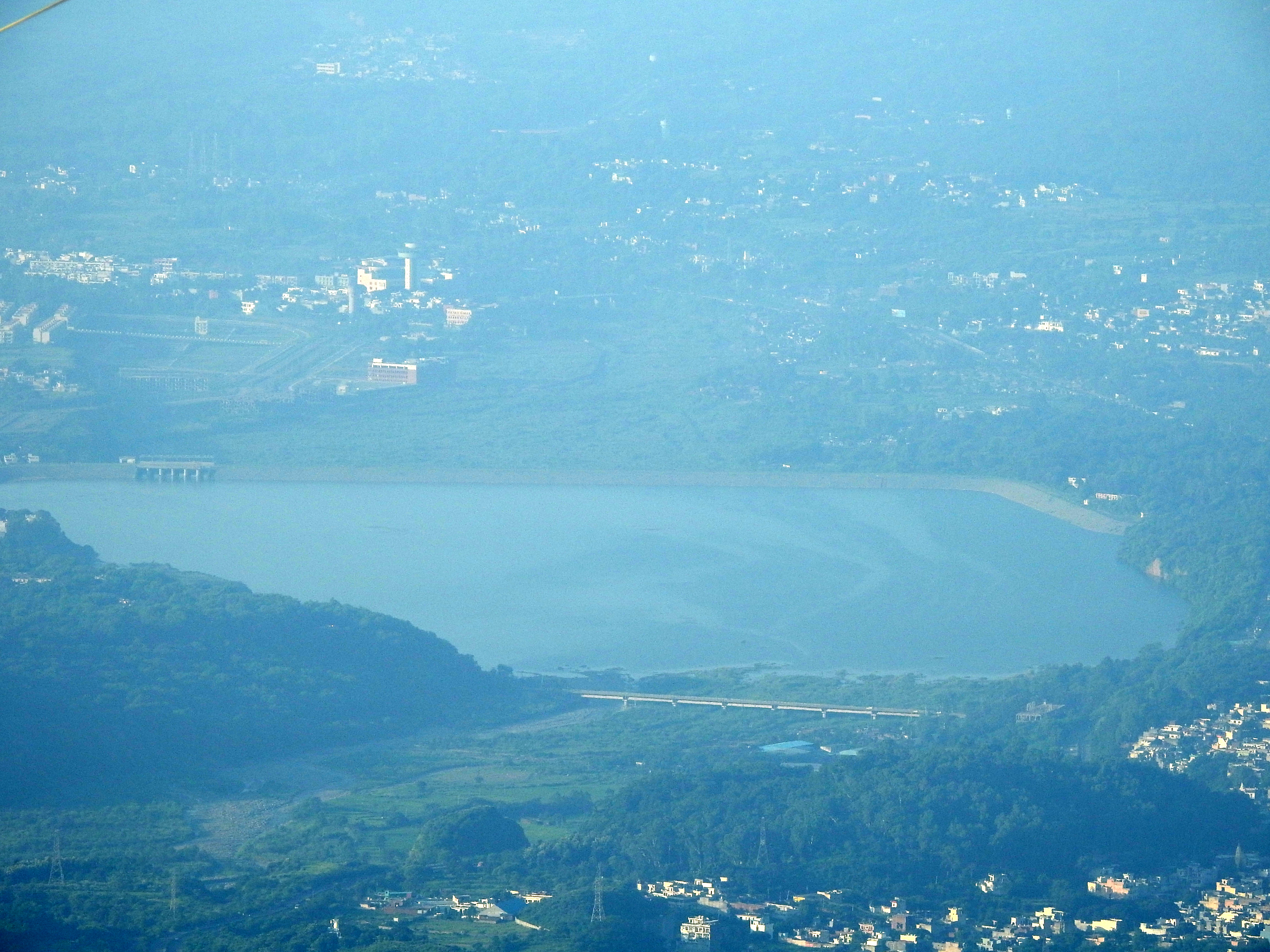
View of Kaushalya dam, from Kasauli

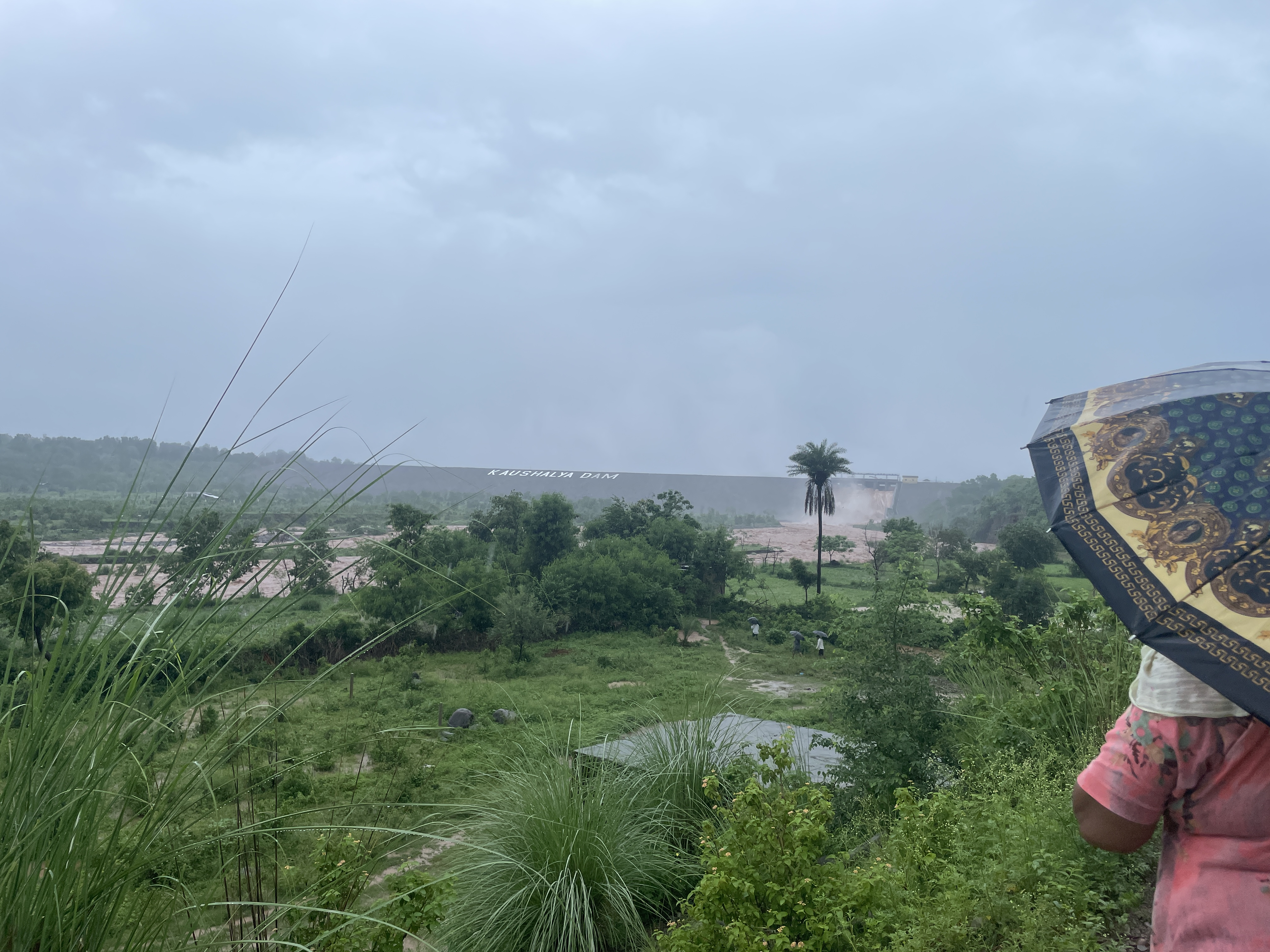
Kaushalya Dam's opened gates during the North Indian Floods of 2023

== See also ==
- Gurugram Bhim Kund (Hindi: गुरुग्राम भीम कुंड), also known as Pinchokhda Jhod (Hindi: पिंचोखड़ा जोहड़)
- Blue Bird Lake, Hisar (city)
- Bhakra Dam
- Hathni Kund Barrage
- Tajewala Barrage
- Okhla Barrage
- Surajkund
- List of dams and reservoirs in Haryana
- List of National Parks & Wildlife Sanctuaries of Haryana, India
