= Tajewala Barrage =

- Tajewala Barrage

- Location within Haryana
- Official name: Tajewala Barrage
- Country: India
- Location: Yamunanagar district, Haryana
- Coordinates: 30°17′47″N 77°33′46″E
- Status: O
- Construction began: 1873
- Opening date: 1873; 153 years ago

Dam and spillways
- Type of dam: Embankment, earth-fill
- Impounds: Yamuna
- Height: 27.73 m (91.0 ft)
- Length: 360 m (1,180 ft)

Tajewala Barrage is a now decommissioned but existing old barrage across the Yamuna River, located in Yamuna Nagar District, in the state of Haryana, India. Completed in 1873, it regulated the flow of the Yamuna for irrigation in Uttar Pradesh and Haryana through two canals originating at this place namely Western Yamuna Canal and Eastern Yamuna Canal, as well as the municipal water supply to Delhi.

== Replaced by the Hathiinikund barrage ==
In 1999, the Hathnikund Barrage was completed to replace the aged Tajewala Barrage which is now out of service.

== See also ==
- Blue Bird Lake, Hisar (city)
- Kaushalya Dam in Pinjore
- Bhakra Dam
- Hathni Kund Barrage
- Okhla Barrage – Western Yamuna Canal begins here
- Surajkund
- Indira Gandhi Canal
- Irrigation in India
- Indian Rivers Inter-link
- Water transport in India
- Ganges Canal
- Ganges Canal (Rajasthan)
- Upper Ganges Canal Expressway
- List of dams and reservoirs in Haryana
