= Hathni Kund Barrage =

- Location within Haryana Location within India
- Country: India
- Location: Yamuna Nagar district
- Coordinates: 30°18′50″N 77°35′04″E
- Construction began: 1996
- Opening date: 1999
- Construction cost: Rs 168 crore
- Owner: Haryana Irrigation Department

Dam and spillways
- Length: 360 m (1,181 ft)
- Spillway type: 10 floodgates, 8 undersluices
- Spillway capacity: 28,200 m^{3}/s (995,874 cu ft/s)

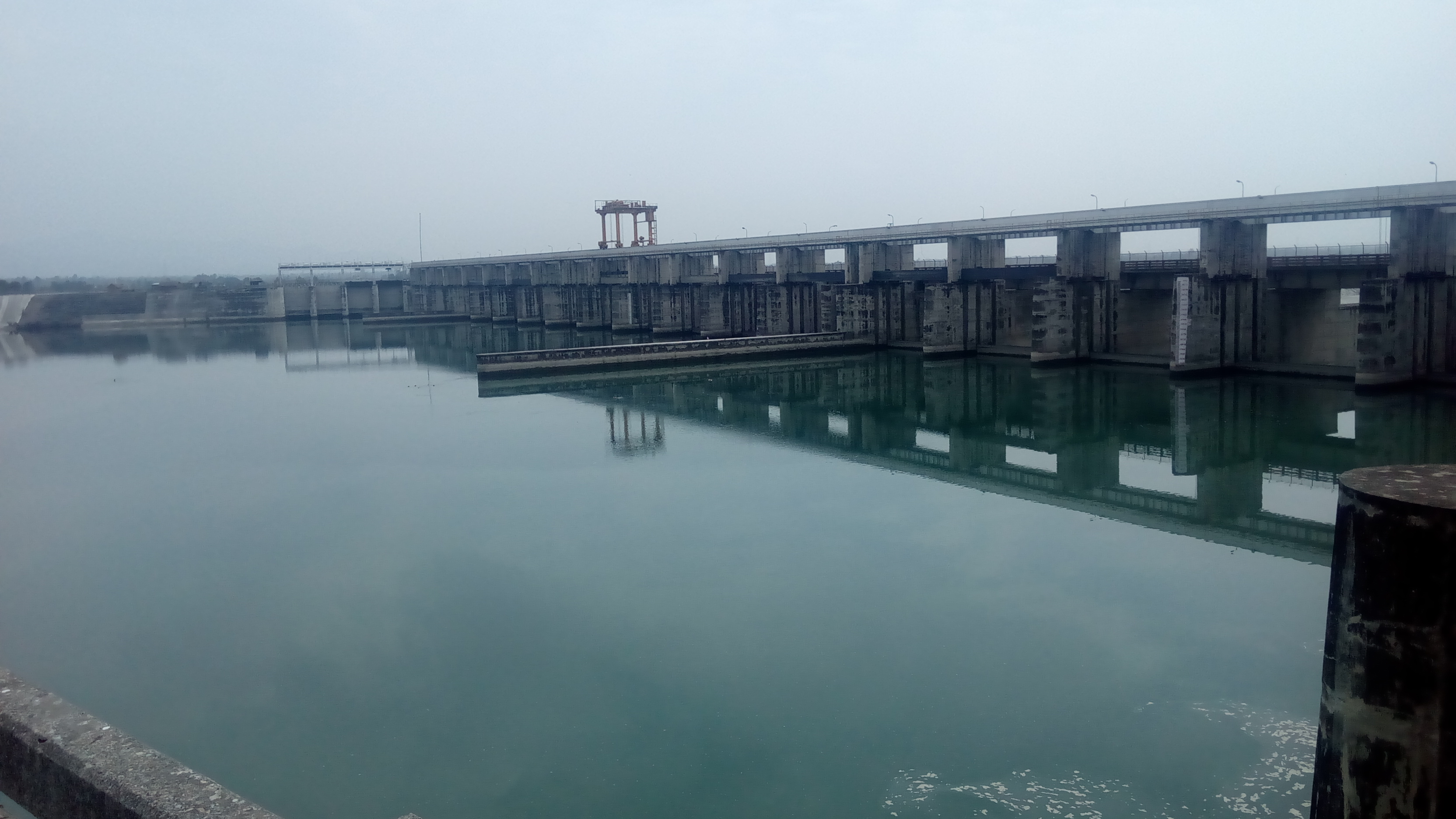

The Hathni Kund is a concrete barrage located on the Yamuna River in Yamuna Nagar district of Haryana state, India. It was constructed between October 1996 and June 1999 for the purpose of irrigation. It replaced the Tajewala Barrage 3 km (2 mi) downstream which was constructed in 1873 and is now out of service. The barrage diverts water into the Western and Eastern Yamuna Canals. The small reservoir created by the barrage also serves as a wetland for 31 species of waterbird.

Plans to replace the Tajewala Barrage had been in the works since the early 1970s but an agreement between the governments of Haryana and Himachal Pradesh (which share the water it diverts) was not made until July 1994. Although the barrage was completed in late 1999, it was not operational until March 2002 because of work delays. The barrage is 360 m (1,181 ft) long and its spillway is composed of ten main floodgates along with five undersluices on its right side and three on its left. The maximum discharge of the barrage is 28,200 m^{3}/s (995,874 cu ft/s) (1 in 500 year flood).

Due to this barrage, 90% of the river volume is diverted leaving only 10% in the original bed flow.

== See also ==
- Gurugram Bhim Kund (Hindi: गुरुग्राम भीम कुंड), also known as Pinchokhda Jhod (Hindi: पिंचोखड़ा जोहड़)
- Dakpathar Barrage
- Kaushalya Dam barrage in Pinjore
- Bhakra Dam barrage
- Tajewala Barrage
- Okhla Barrage - Western Yamuna Canal begins here
- Surajkund barrage
- List of National Parks & Wildlife Sanctuaries of Haryana, India
- List of dams and reservoirs in Haryana
- Western Jamuna Canal Link
