= Surajkund =

Reservoir in Haryana state, India

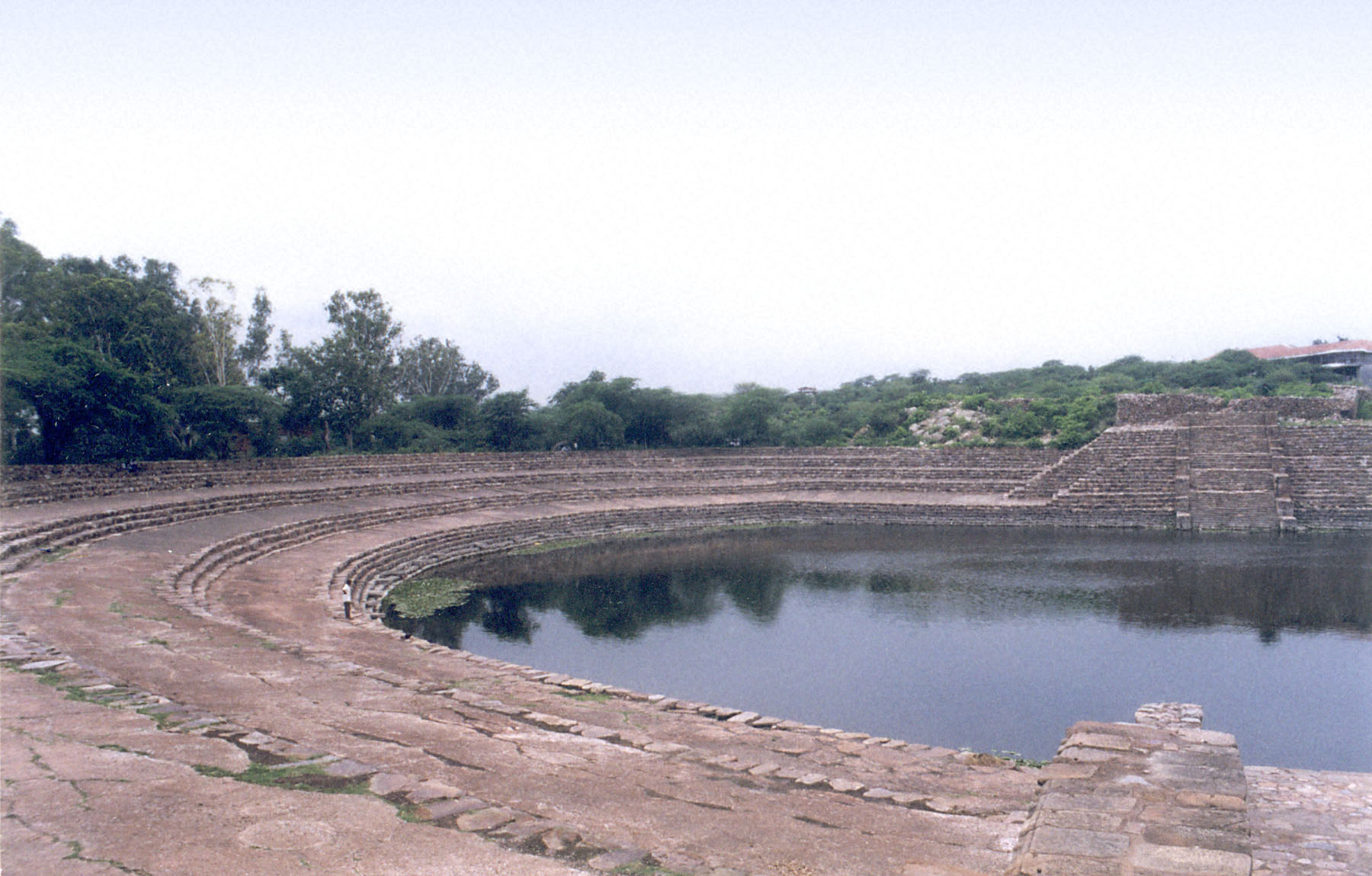
- View of Surajkund

- Location within Haryana
- Location: Surajkund, Faridabad
- Coordinates: 28.48379°N 77.28270°E
- Type: Reservoir
- Basin countries: India
- Settlements: Faridabad

Surajkund is an ancient reservoir of the 10th century located on Southern Delhi Ridge of Aravalli Range in Faridabad city of Haryana state about 8 km (5 mi) from South Delhi. Surajkund (literally 'Lake of the Sun') is an artificial Kund ('Kund' means "lake" or reservoir) built in the backdrop of the Aravalli Range with an amphitheatre shaped embankment constructed in semicircular form. It is said to have been built by the king Surajpal of the Tomara Rajput dynasty in the 10th century. Tomar, a younger son of Anangpal Tomar- the Rajput ruler of Delhi, was a sun worshipper and he had therefore built a Sun temple on its western bank. Surajkund is known for its annual fair "Surajkund International Craft Mela", 2015 edition of this fair was visited by 1.2 million visitors including 160,000 foreigners with more than 20 countries participating in it.

There are 43 Paleolithic sites (100,000 BC), with rock art and microlithic stone tools, scattered surround the Surajkund from Mangar Bani in the west to Tuglaqabad in the northeast.

It is an important biodiversity area within the Northern Aravalli leopard wildlife corridor stretching from Sariska Tiger Reserve to Delhi. Historical place around sanctuary are Badkhal Lake (6 km northeast), Anangpur Dam (16 km north), Damdama Lake, Tughlaqabad Fort and Adilabad ruins (both in Delhi), Chhatarpur Temple (in Delhi). It is contiguous to the seasonal waterfalls in Pali-Dhuaj-Kot villages of Faridabad, the sacred Mangar Bani and the Asola Bhatti Wildlife Sanctuary. There are several dozen lakes formed in the abandoned open pit mines in and around the area. Surajkund falls inside the leopard habitat.

Another 'kund' by the same name as 'Suraj Kund' existed in Sunam in Punjab, which was sacked by Mahmood Ghaznvi or Taimur Lane, consequently now lies in ruins.

== Location ==
Surajkund is located near the Surajkund village between the villages of Badarpur and Lakkarpur in Faridabad district of Haryana. It is 8 kilometres (5 mi) by road from South Delhi and 20 kilometres (12 mi) from the heart of the New Delhi city. It is well connected to all parts of the city. The nearest airport is the Indira Gandhi International Airport, 25 km (16 mi) away. The nearest railway stations are the New Delhi Railway Station and the Nizamuddin Railway Station, 22 kilometres (14 mi) and 21 kilometres (13 mi) respectively by road. It is also approached by road and rail from Faridabad (headquarters of the district) and Gurgaon cities. It is 11.5 kilometres (7 mi) from the Qutub Minar and 3 kilometres (2 mi) Tughlaqabad, two historical.

== History ==
=== Paleolithic era (100,000 BP) ===
In the forested area where the Surajkund and the Anagpur Dam are located, ancient Stone Age relics have been found which are microliths (stone tools) belonging to Lower Paleolithic era. These were found at 43 sites from Ankhir (a village 17 km east of Mangar Bani) in south to north along Anangpur-Angnpur Dam-Surajkund-Tughlaqabad axis. These sites are on the 'Tughlaqabad-Surajkund Road' and south of 'Surajkund-Faridabad Road', on Anangpur hills, and on Ankhir hill, and on the road embracing the low ridge from Faridabad (Ankhir) to Surajkund. From a study of the prehistoric findings along the ridges of Surajkund reservoir, Anagpur Dam, and around Delhi and adjoining parts of Haryana, it has been inferred that the southern hilly area of Delhi and Haryana was environmentally suited for pre-historic man to settle here.

Paleolithic tools, rock paintings and rock art found in 2021 at various sites scattered inside the Mangar Bani might be extension of Anangpur-Surajkund Paleolithic sites.

=== Medieval history ===
According to Hindu hagiography, the Dilli Mahatam, the Surajkund was earlier known as the Prabhashkund where sage Vishwamitra used to live, pray and worship.

=== Tomara dynasty (8th - 11th century CE) ===
Anangpal I, first king of Tomar dynasty (c.736- 1052 CE), declared himself an independent ruler and established the Tomar Rajput dynasty of Delhi in the early 8th century. He built his capital in this village and expanded his kingdom from there. He is said to have built numerous palaces and temples during his reign, the majority of which are diminished now.

Last king of this dynasty was Anangpal Tomar (Anangpal II), who had built Delhi's Lal Kot, which was later renovated by Chauhan ruler and also came to be known as the Qila Rai Pithora. Tomar dynasty were overthrown by another Rajput dynasty, the Chahamanas of Shakambhari. The last Chahamana or Chauhan king was Prithviraj Chauhan (the second last Hindu king of Delhi), Qila Rai Pithora (earlier called Lal Kot) was renamed after him.

The capital of Tomars changed a few times during the course of 457 years they ruled in the northern India. The first capital of the Tomar empire was Anangpur while the last one was Dhillikapuri (Delhi, Lal Kot).

Though historians have not specifically alluded to this tank, it is also said that it was built in 686 AD by Surajmal (after whom the tank is probably named) son of Anang Pal I. It is in the form of a segment (semi circular) with the chord on its west side. Another theory for the name 'Suraj' suffixed to the kund (lake) is that it was named after the Sun Temple that existed on the east side of the lake. Archaeological excavations have revealed existence of a Sun temple here based on ruins that can be seen even now. Certain carved stones were recently recovered from the reservoir. Some stones have also been re–used in subsequent restoration works. Historians also claim it was named after King Surajpal himself who built it. It is also said that Surajmal built this lake for his daughter.

=== Chauhan dynasty (12th century CE) ===
The Tomara's rule was followed by that of the Chahamanas and the mlechchha Sahavadina (Shihab ad-Din).

=== Sultanate era renovation (1351–88 CE) ===
During the Tughlaq Dynasty rule of Feroz Shah Tughlaq (1351–88), the reservoir was refurbished by rebuilding the steps and terraces with stones in lime mortar. On the western bank of the reservoir, a garhi (cave like structure) was built close to the ancient site of the Sun temple.

=== Post-independence of India (1947 onward) ===
Even though the Tomar dynasty vanished in the 12th century, the Surajkund has not been affected. It attracted the attention of the Haryana Government to develop the area as a tourist spot by introducing an annual crafts 'Mela' or "fair" titled "Surajkund Crafts Mela" in the precincts of the lake, which over the years has attracted wide publicity and become an iconic event.

== Surajkund ==
=== Architecture of Surajkund ===
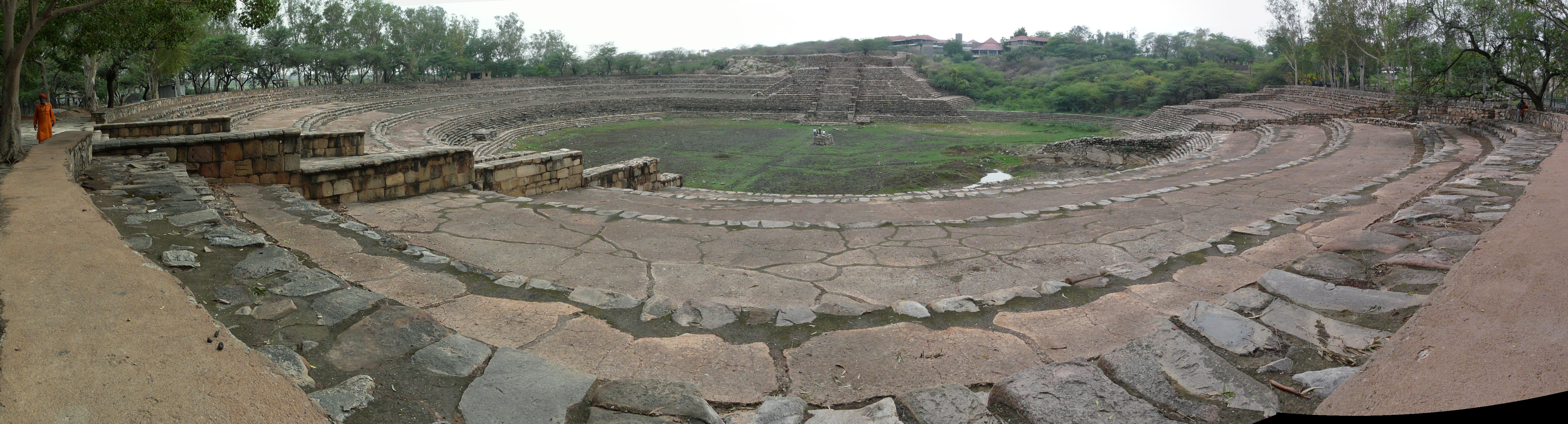
A panoramic view of the entire Surjakund lake during the dry season.

The reservoir has been built in the shape of the rising sun with an eastward arc. It is enclosed within a steep embankment made in semi-circular shape made of stepped stones. Rain fall was intercepted here to create a reservoir of 130 m (427 ft) diameter to meet the water shortage in Delhi. It has an area of 40 ha (99 acres). The reservoir provides a grand spectacle, and in the past it was the hunting forest resort. It abounds in dancing peacocks. The reservoir is filled up during every monsoon season but remains dry during summer, before the onset of the monsoon rains. The tank underwent major repairs in the 1920s during the British times.

=== Anagpur Dam ===
Anagpur Dam, constructed in 8th century, is 2 kilometres (1.2 mi) upstream of Surajkund in the north west. A seasonal stream flows from Anagpur Dam to Surajkund.

=== Peacock lake ===
Peacock lake is downstream and southwest of Surajkund.

== Fairs and festivals ==
=== Surajkund International Crafts Mela ===
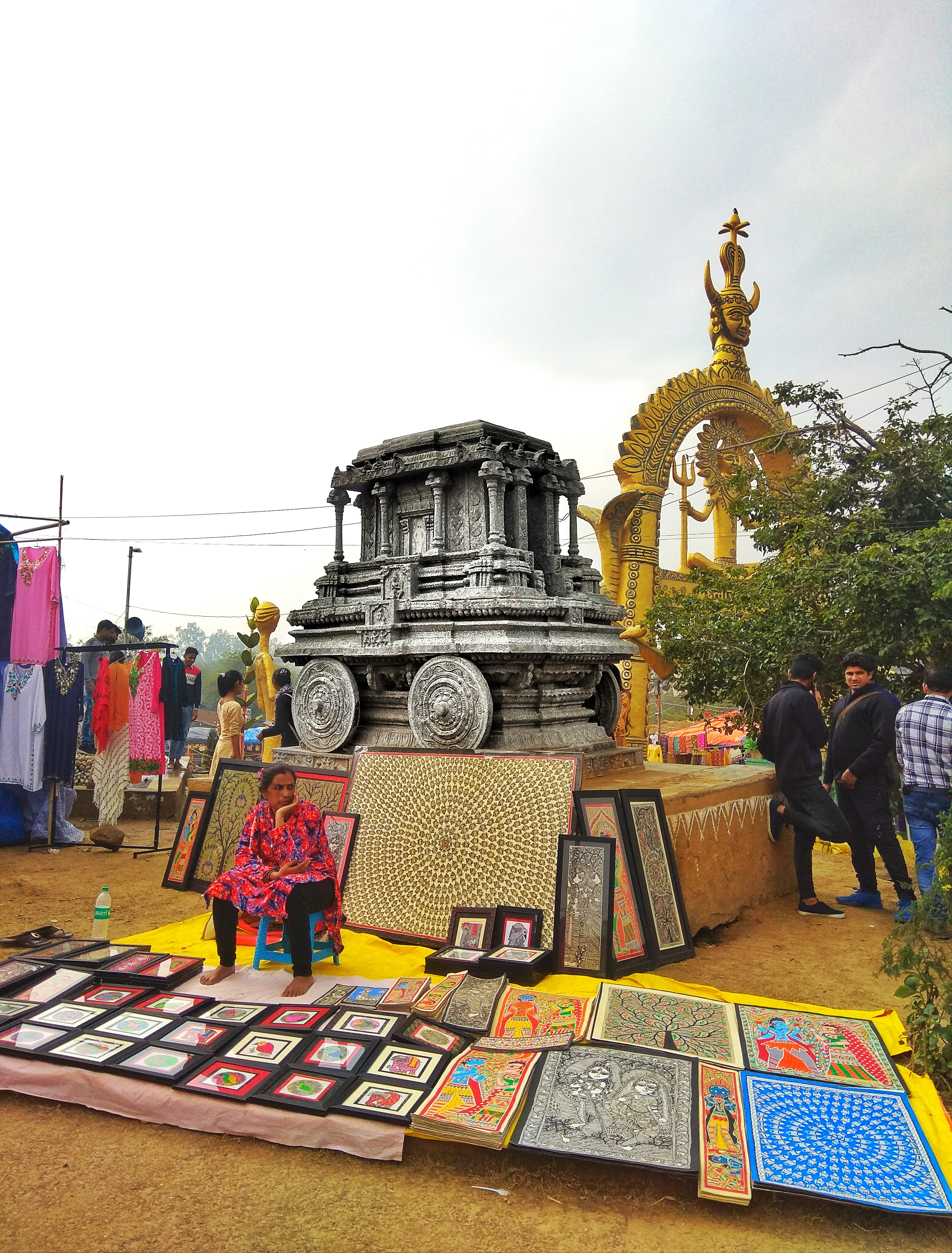
In this image you can see the paintings which is for sale in Suraj Kund mela.

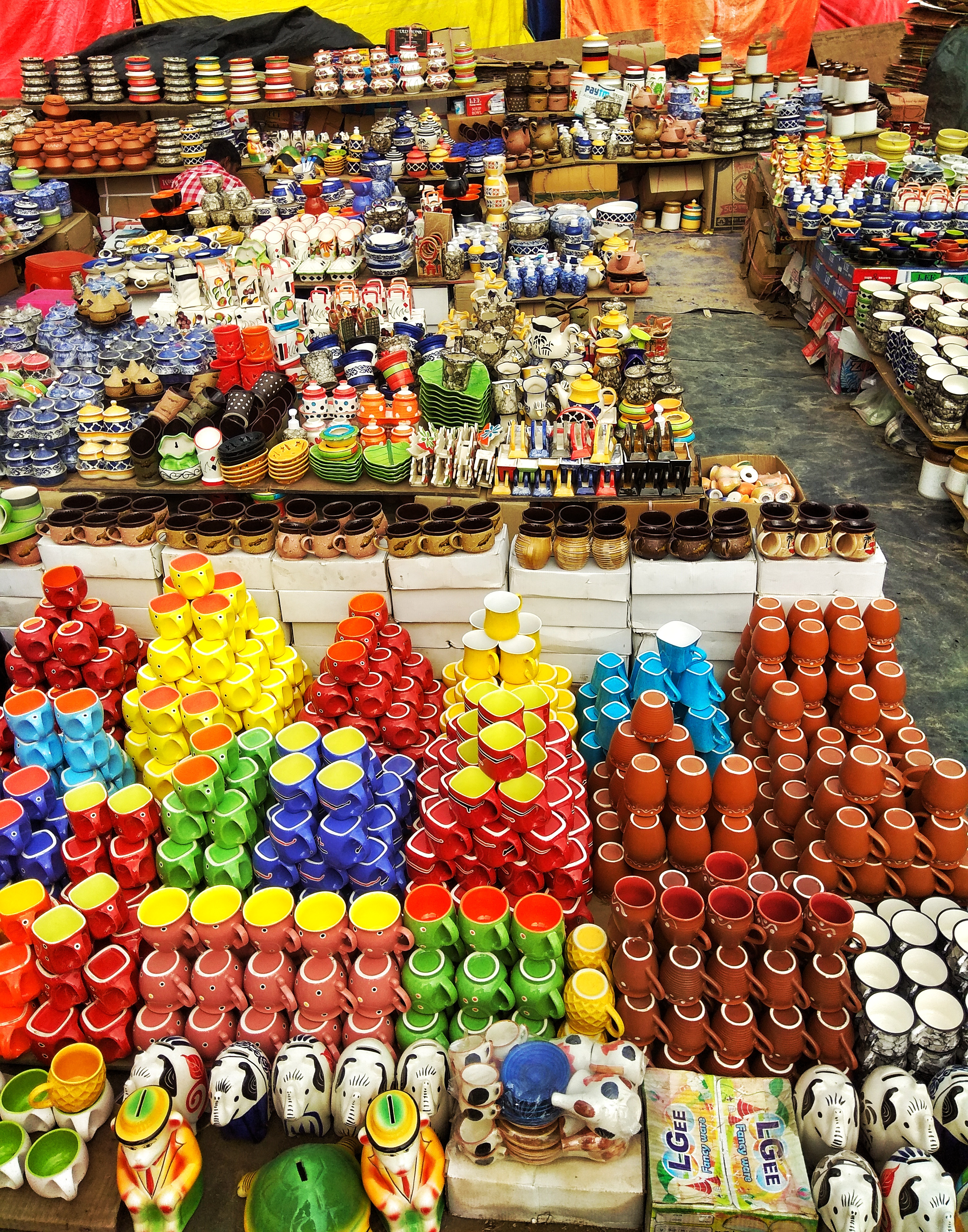
In this image you can see the crockery which is for sale in Suraj Kund mela.

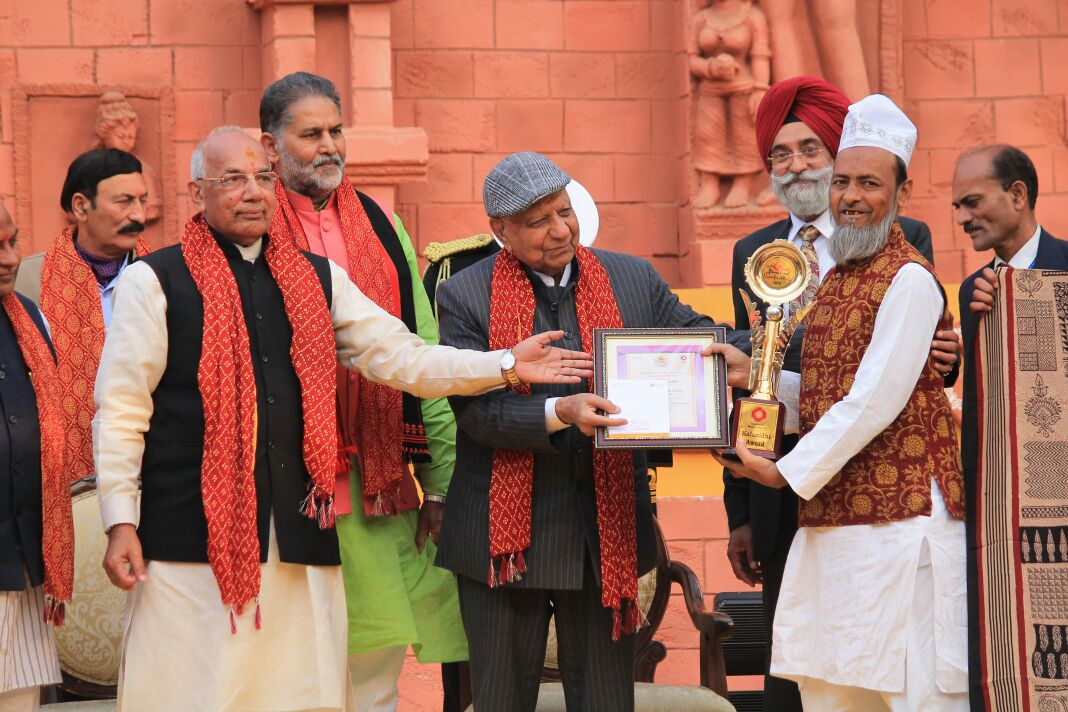
Bagh Print Craftsman Abdul Kadar Khatri receiving Kala Nidhi Award at Surajkund International Crafts Mela, 2015.

A Unique Ganesha image displayed at Surjakund Mela

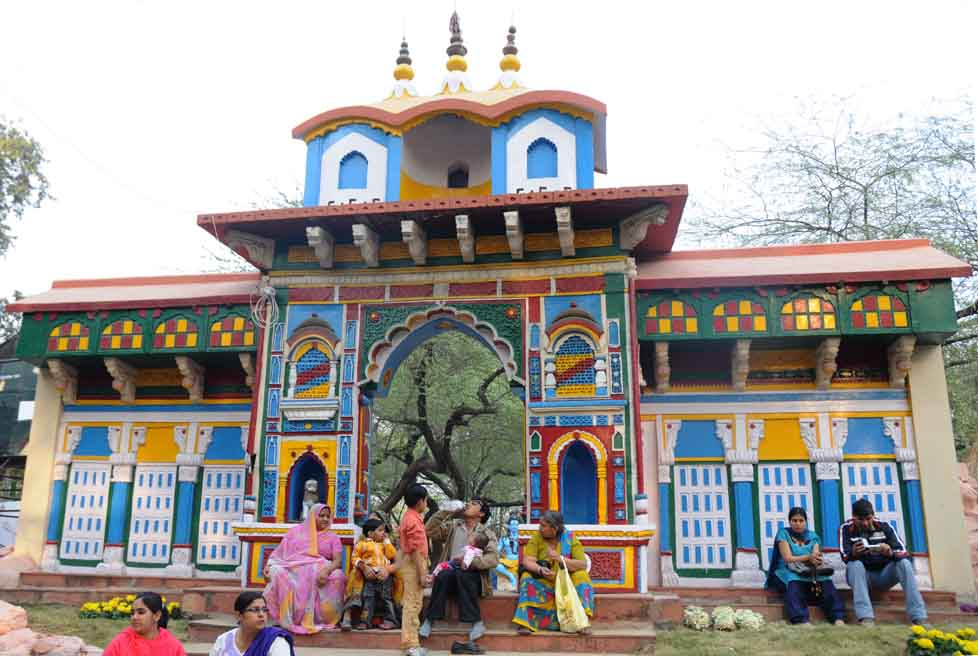
Uttrakhand state theme at the entry gate of the Mela in the form of Badrinath Temple entrance

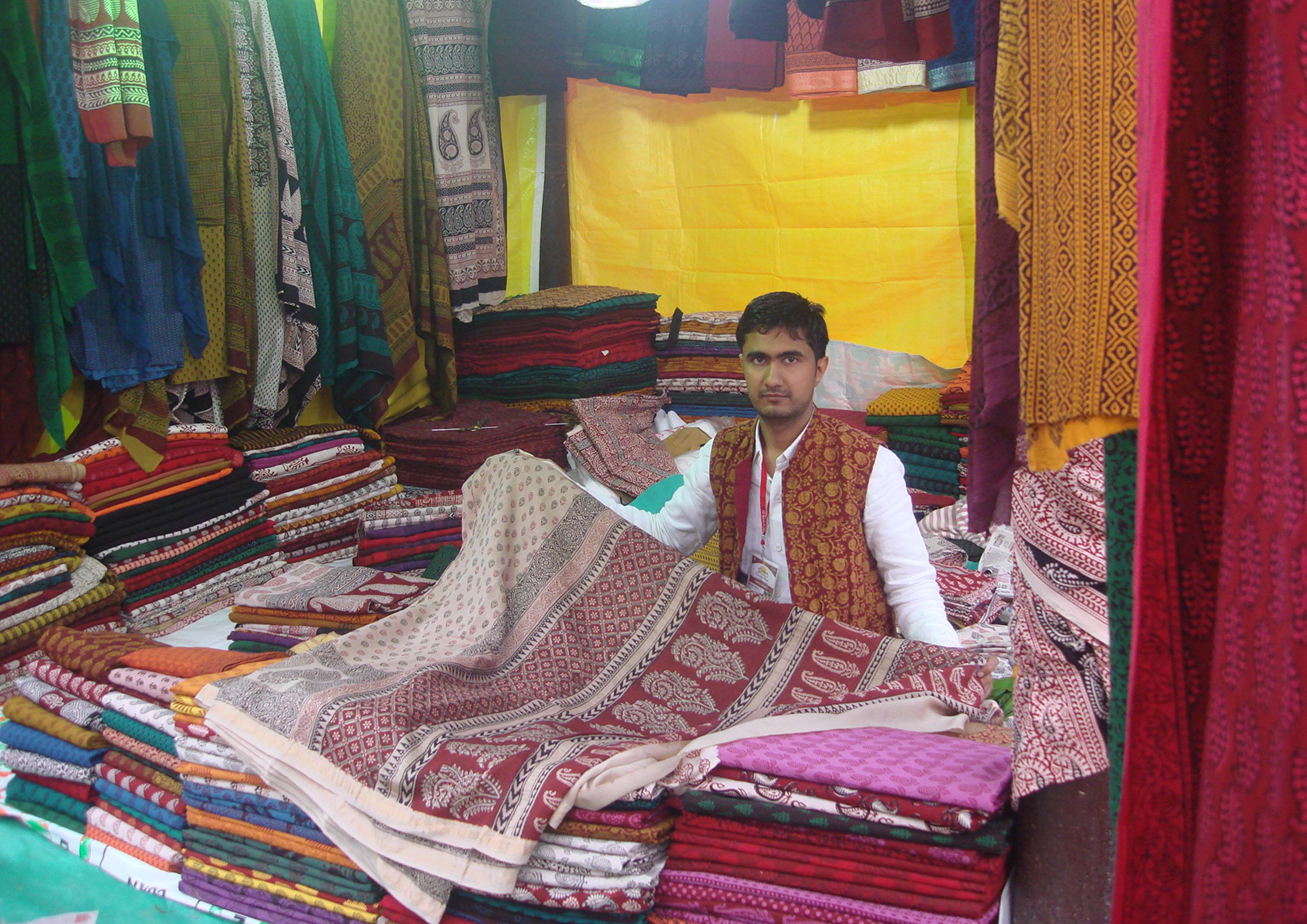
A traditional Bagh Print craftsman from Bagh, Madhya Pradesh, at Surajkund International Crafts Mela 2015

In the backdrop of the lake, during the spring season, every year from 1–15 February, (in 2018, it is from 2–18 February) a colourful traditional craft festival of India is held on 40 acres of land in the precincts of Surajkund which is attended by all states of India along with several dozen other nations and over 1.2 million visitors including 200,000 foreigners. With 1.3 million record attendees in 2020, it ranks among the world's largest peaceful gathering in one to two million category. This fair was first started in 1987. Traditional craftsmen (artists, painters, weavers and sculptors) from all parts of the country participate in this annual celebration named as the "Surajkund Crafts Mela" or "Surajkund designer's Village". Designer items created by 50 best designers and craftsmen in wood, metal, bamboo, iron, glass, textiles and stone can be seen here. This Mela (fair) is visited by lovers of arts and crafts from all over the world. The fair is held with a different theme every year on Indian culture and crafts.

The theme, specific to a state of India, is depicted at the entrance to the Mela grounds and provides an ambience of that particular state with characteristic colors, materials, architecture, furniture and decorations. The crafts on display in the stalls (400) is of particular crafts of that state. The Mela also includes a food festival covering some of the popular cuisines from different parts of the country. Entertainment in the form of famous rhythms and dance of folk theatre are also held here during the festival.

During 2009, with Madhya Pradesh as the theme state, 50 crafts' persons from SAARC countries, Thailand and Egypt also participated in the Mela. The show was titled "Hemvati-Khajuraho" as a part of the 23rd annual Surajkund Crafts Fair event. Sanchi Stupa, (a world heritage site in Madhya Pradesh) formed the backdrop for the festival. 2015 edition of fair was visited by 1.2 million visitors including 160,000 foreigners. In 2016 edition China will be participating in the fair as a part of agreement signed between India and China to celebrate 2016 as "Year of China in India".

=== Surajkund Diwali Festival ===
Surajkund Diwali Utsav, week long festival is held every year on Hindu festival of lights Diwali around October–November, entailing cuisine, traditional art and craft, workshops, Deepotsav (lighting where thousands of oil lamps), etc across various themed zones such as indigenous zone, cultural zone, food zone, and funfair zone.

== Ecology ==
=== Wildlife in this area ===
This is one of the area where leopards of Haryana frequent.

=== Other water bodies of Haryana and Delhi NCR ===
- Gurugram Bhim Kund
- Bhakra Dam
- Hathni Kund Barrage
- Tajewala Barrage
- Okhla Barrage - Western Yamuna Canal begins here.

== Concerns and conservation ==
=== Ban on illegal mining ===
Supreme Court of India, put an end to the illegal mining in the area around Surajkund which was causing ecological disaster and rapid depletion of ground water in the Aravalli hill range between Tughlaqabad and Gurugram via Surajkund. Supreme Court has asked the Haryana Government "to stop all mining activities and pumping of groundwater within a (5 kilometres (3 mi)), radius of the Delhi-Haryana border in the Haryana Ridge and in the Aravali hills."

=== Damage to the catchment area ===
The storage in the upstream Anangpur Dam, downstream Surajkund and Peacock lake has been seriously affected The catchment area which contributes water flows into the Surajkund (lake) from villages, such as Anangpur, Lakkarpur, Ankhir and Meola Maharajpur, has been used for extensive mining and for large habitations. This has disturbed the drainage system and thus obstructed the gravity flow of rain water from the basin into the reservoir. This has also affected the flora and fauna of the area. The Surajkund lake's drainage basin is part of the Aravalli hill ranges. It is fed from the north western side by a local nullah (stream) that initially feeds the Anagpur dam on the upstream, this dam was built by Samrat Anangpal Tomar.

=== Leopard corridor ===
Surajkund falls inside the leopard habitat of Delhi and Haryana which often get killed due to being hit by the vehicles on the Gurugram-Faridabad Road as there is no wildlife crossing underpass or overpass.

=== Wetland rehabilitation ===
Asola Bhatti Wildlife Sanctuary is close to the Surajkund. Mine pits in this area have been converted to wetland habitat, which will improve the ground water regime in the area.

=== Protected status ===
As of 31 July 2021, Head of HAD, Ashok Khemka, informed that the whole area will be extensively surveyed to find any additional sites, entire area of Delhi South Ridge of Aravali in Haryana between Gurugram and Faridabad will be mapped and each site will be GPS tagged. Large scale scientific excavations, scientific dating of paintings and excavated sediments will be undertaken. A proposal to notify this entire area as protected archaeological site has been sent by Haryana Archaeological Dept (HAD) to Govt of Haryana (GoH), and HAD is awaiting gazette notification by the GoH.

== Gallery ==
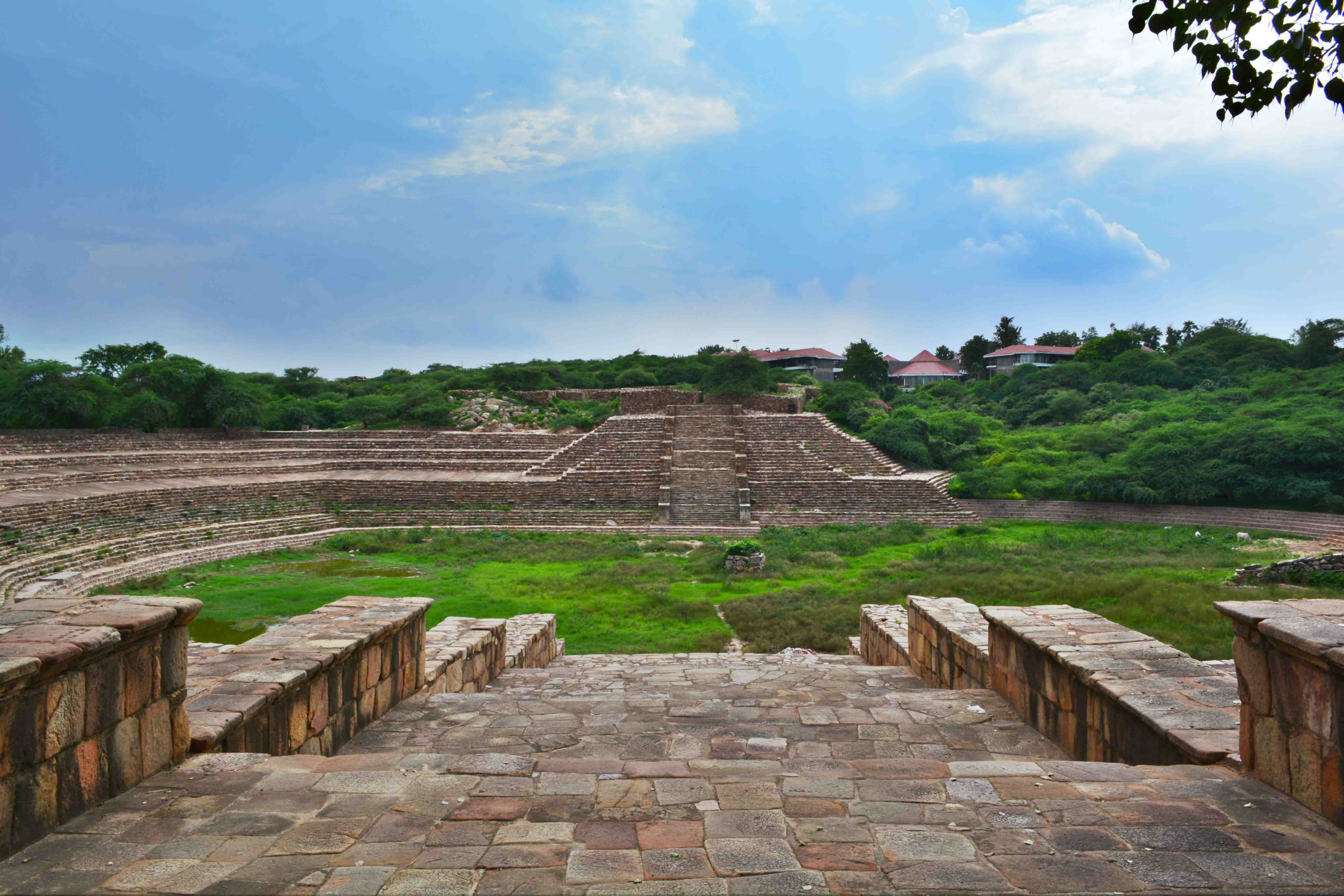
Looking from first raised platform towards the second raised platform.

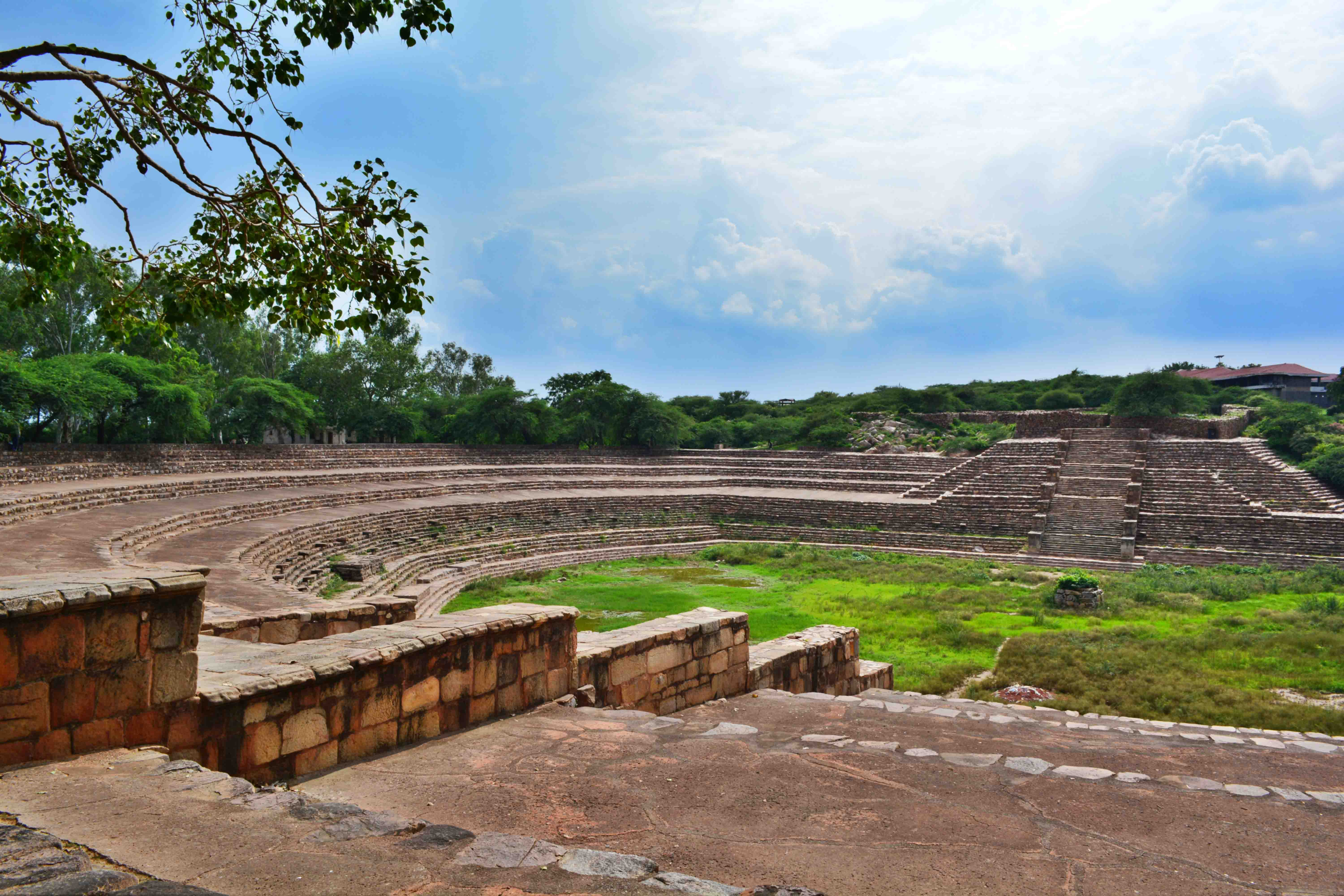
Raised platform at Surajkund at which sun temple was situated.

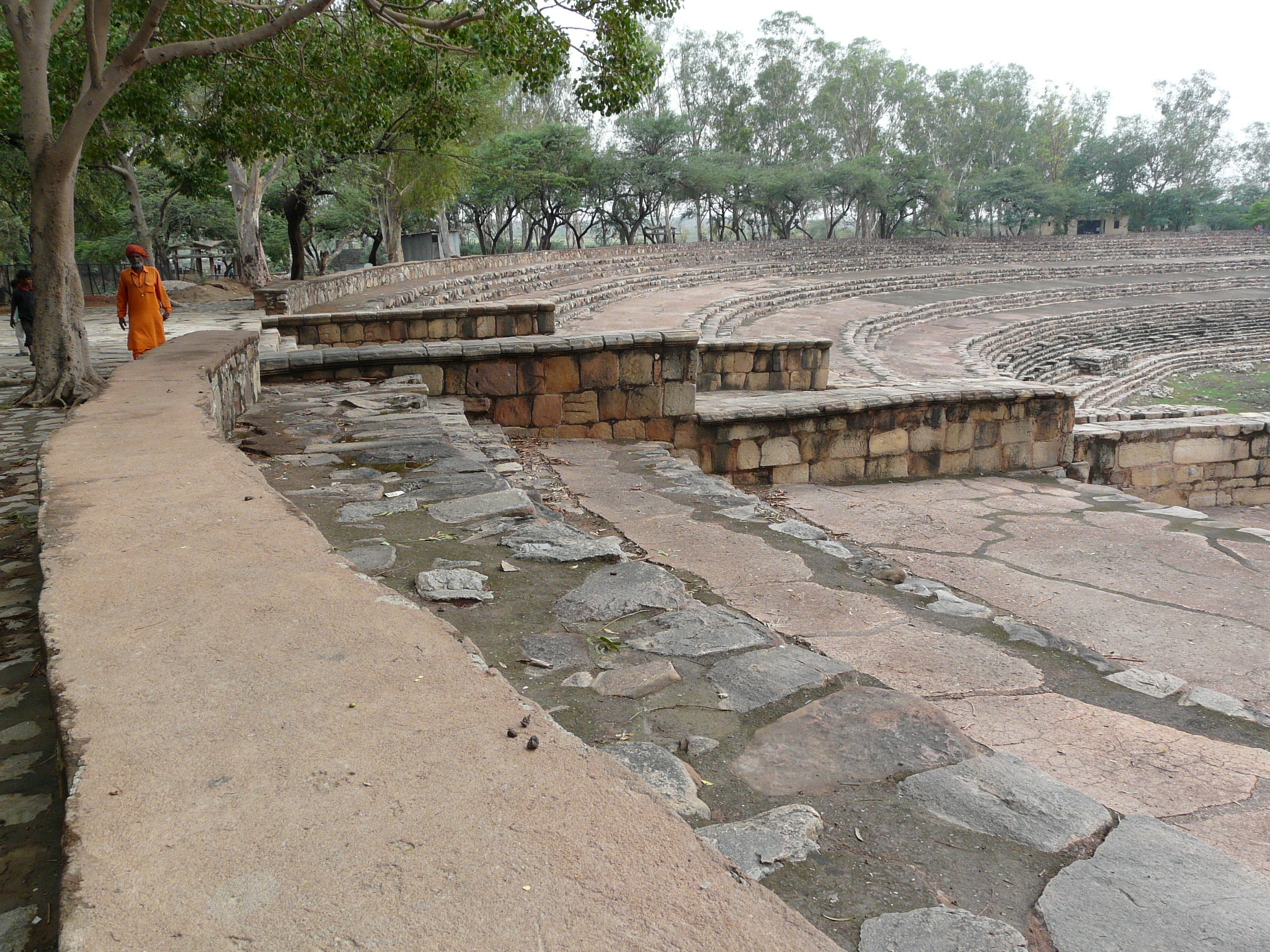
Suraj Kund View

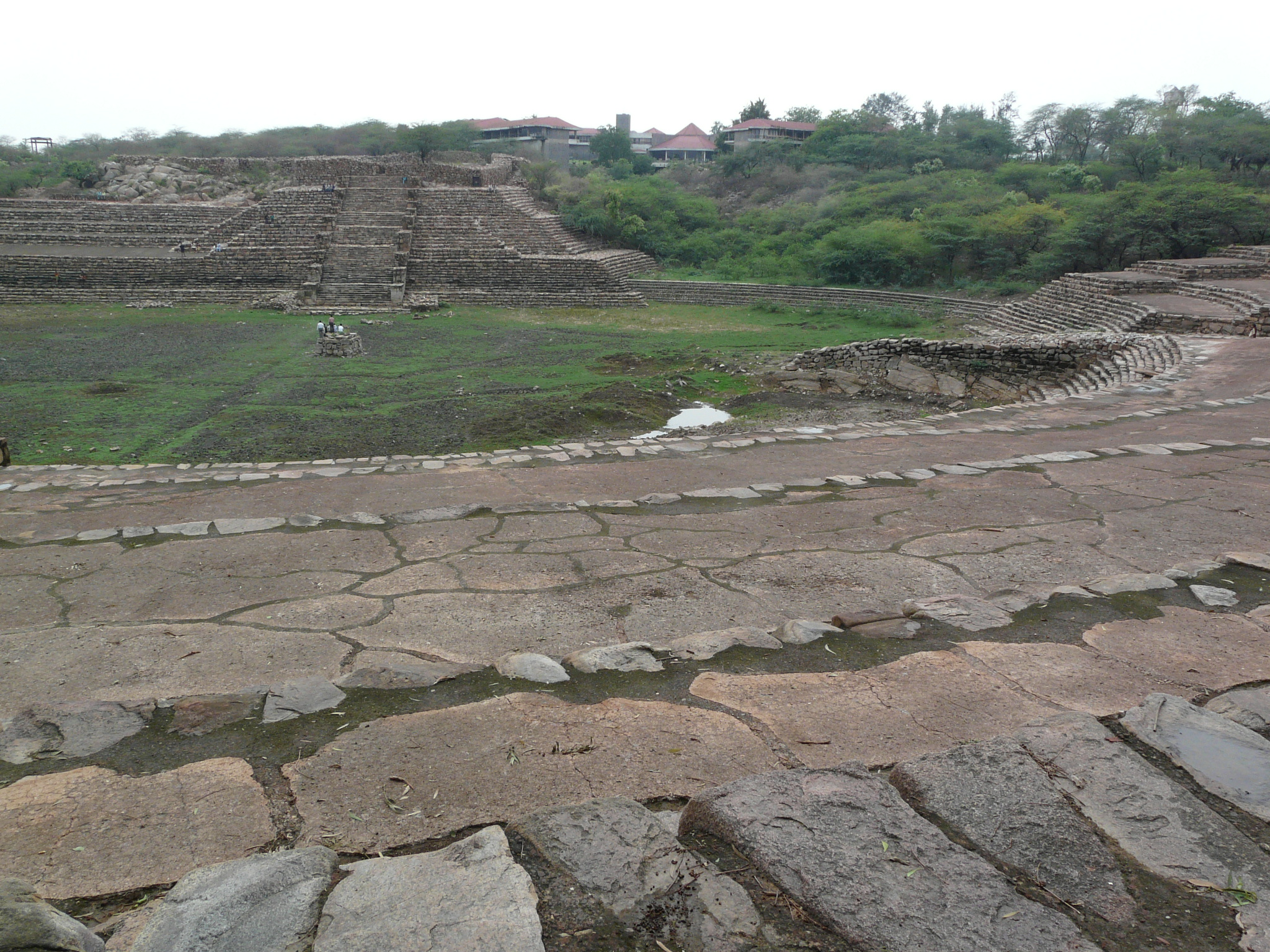
Suraj Kund View

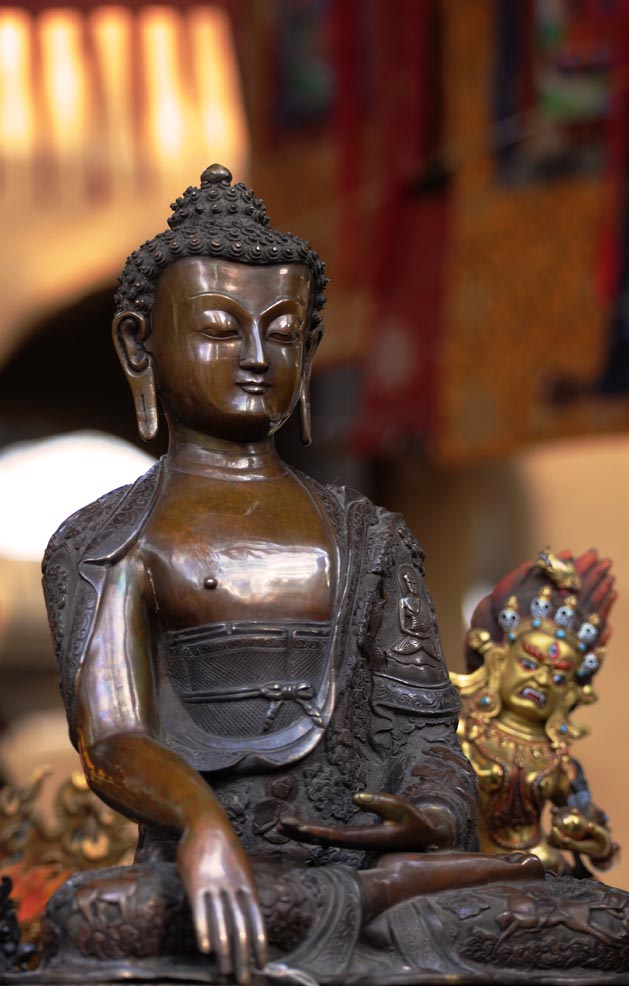
Buddha Statue

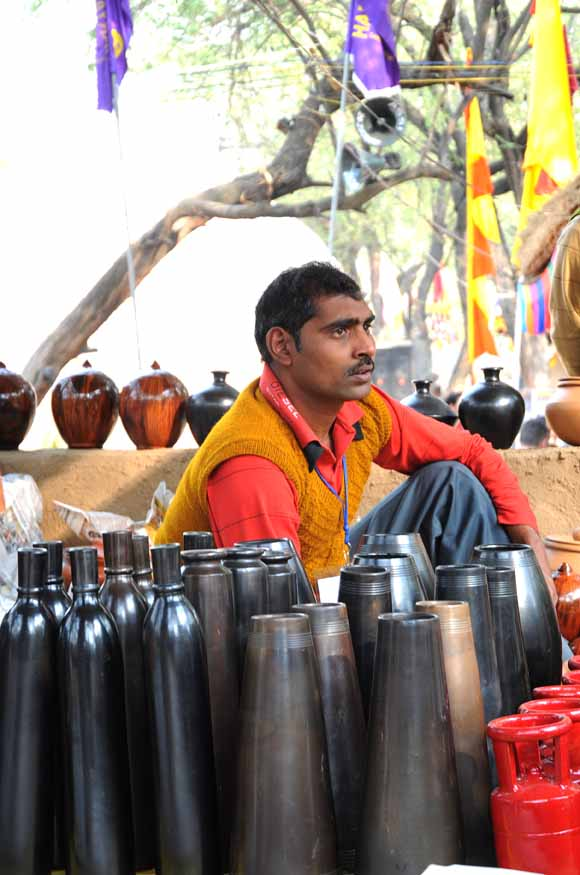
Sale of Potters

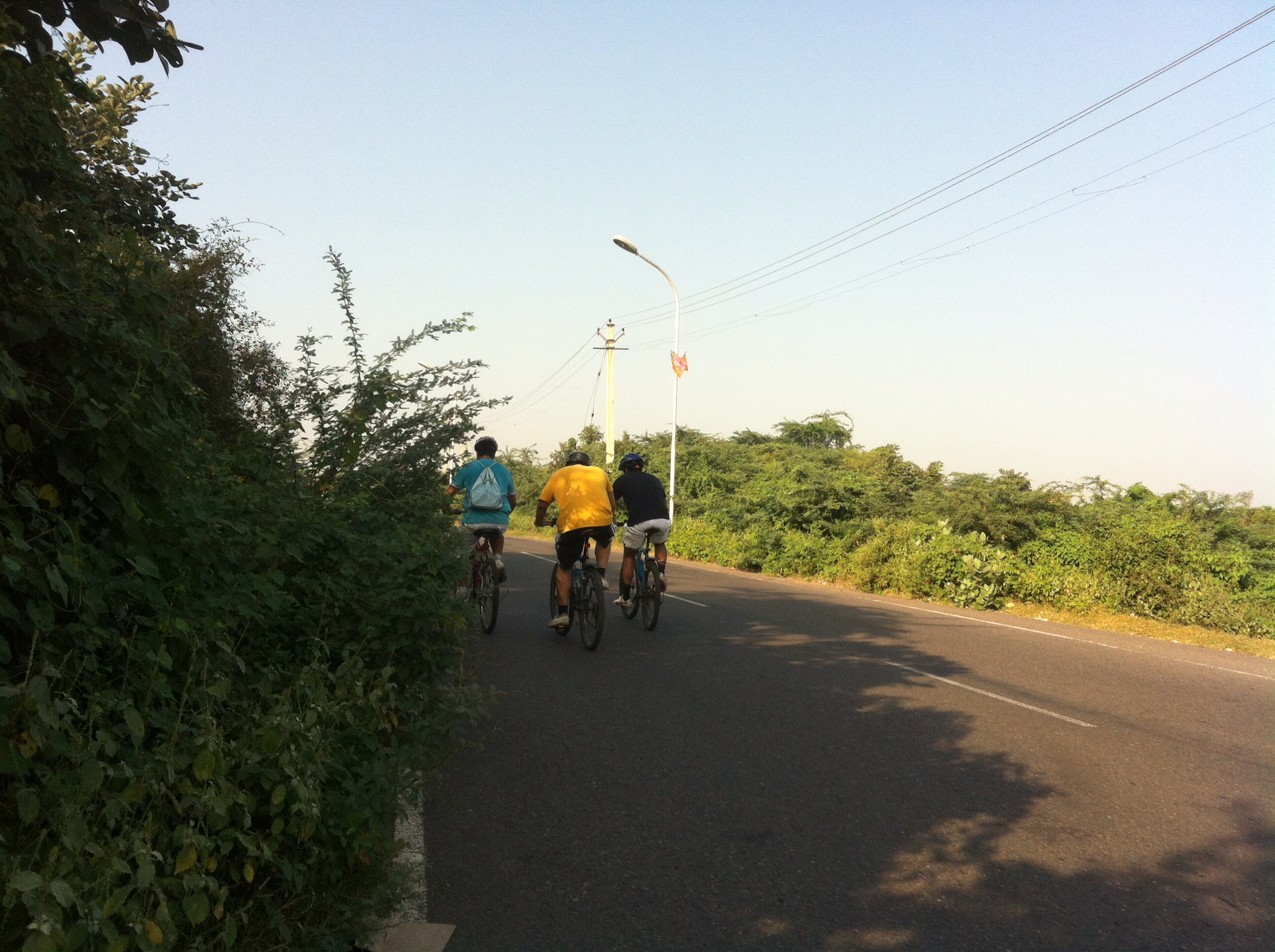
Cyclists biking in Surajkund

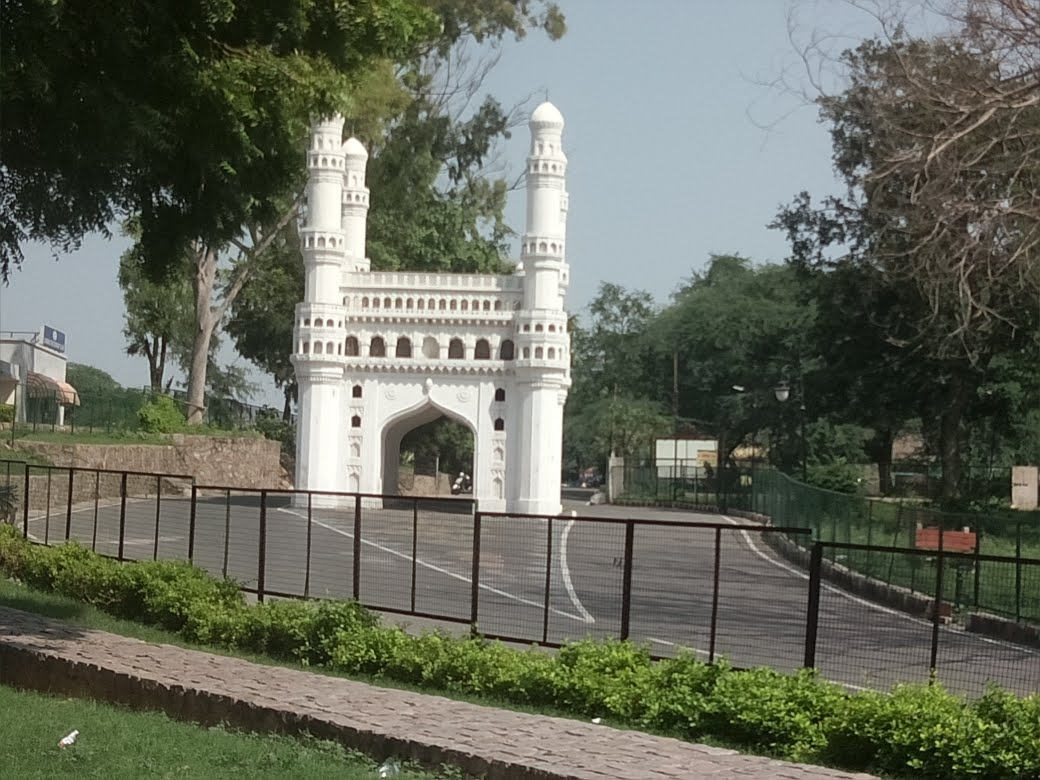
Charminar "Surajkund"

== See also ==
- Ancient sites of Haryana
  - Anangpur monuments and prehistoric sites
  - List of Monuments of National Importance in Haryana
  - List of State Protected Monuments in Haryana
  - List of Indus Valley Civilization sites in Haryana
- Stepwells of India
  - Rani ki vav, UNESCO heritage listed
  - List of stepwells in India by states
