= Malegaon (village) =

Village in Maharashtra

Coordinates: 19.877°N 73.973°E

Malegaon MIDC is an industrial zone in the Sinnar taluka of Nashik district, Maharashtra state, India. It is located 6 kilometres (3.7 mi) from the city of Sinnar.

== Demographics ==
According to Census of India 2011, the total population of Malegaon was 2955. 1824 males and 1131 females. The number of house holds is estimated to be 622.

== Tourism ==
Malegaon is home to the Gargoti Museum which houses a collection of mineral specimens found in the surrounding area. The museum is noted for its collection of zeolites.

== Industry ==
Malegaon is home to one of the branches of the Maharashtra Industrial Development Corporation, a state-owned collection of industrial parks. The Malegaon MIDC is home to companies involved in manufacturing and pharmaceuticals.

== Education ==
Schools in the Malegaon MIDC include

- Vasant Rao Naik
- Sir Visvesvaraya Institute Of Technology
