= Patole =

Village in Maharashtra

- village
- Location in Maharashtra, India
- Coordinates: 19°47′07″N 73°59′53″E
- Country: India
- State: Maharashtra
- District: Nashik

Government
  - Type: village
  - Body: gram panchayat with sarpanch

Population (2011)
  - Total: 2,714

Languages
  - Official: Marathi
- Time zone: UTC+5:30 (IST)
- PIN: 422103
- Telephone code: 02551
- Vehicle registration: MH 15

Patole is a village in Sinnar taluka of Nashik district in the Indian state of Maharashtra. The current sarpanch of Patole is Shri Meghraj Suresh Avhad who is a civil engineer. A village is nearly 7 to 9 km from Sinnar and is surrounded by mountains in one side. 'Chondhi' waterfall in those hills is site to watch in rainy season.

== Geography ==
Patole is located at 19°47′07″N 73°59′53″E. Patole is one of the major commercial villages in Sinnar taluka. By road, it lies nine kilometers south of Sinnar city.

== Demographics ==
In the 2011 Indian census, Patole had a population of 2,714. Males constituted 51.1% of the population and females 48.9%. Patole had an average literacy rate of 85.38%, higher than the national average of 59.5%, with male literacy at 93.1%, and female literacy at 77.4%. In 2011 approximately 10% of the population was aged six or below.
