= Pinjore =

Town in India

- Town
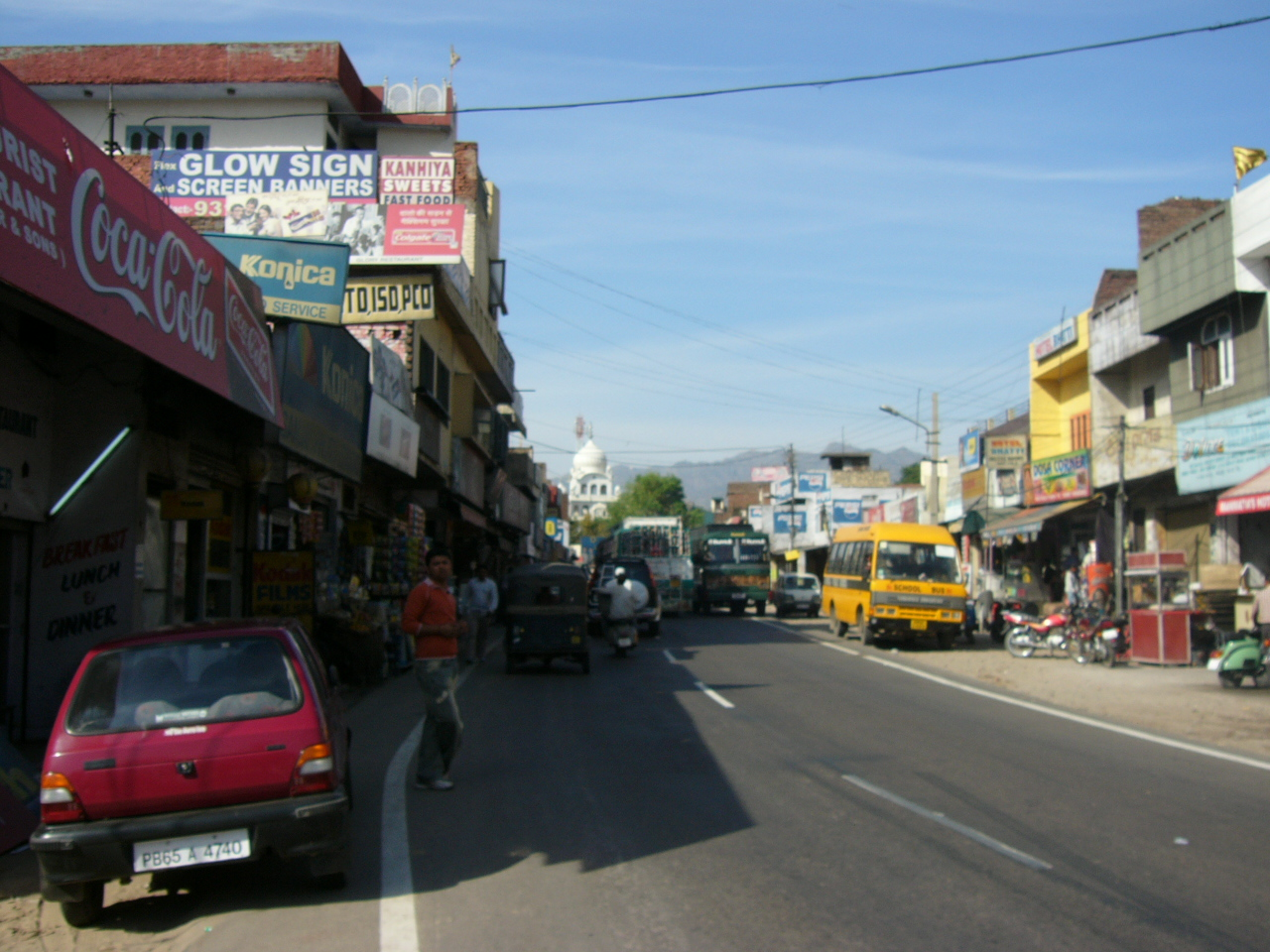
- Shops on the side of Kalka Zirakpur Highway in Pinjore

- Location in Haryana, India Pinjore (India)
- Coordinates: 30.7972°N 76.9172°E
- Country: India
- State: Haryana
- District: Panchkula
- Elevation: 554 m (1,818 ft)

Population (2011)
  - Total: 35,912

Languages
  - Official: Hindi
  - Native: Mahasui (Baghati)
- Time zone: UTC+5:30 (IST)
- Pin Code: 134102
- Area code: 01733
- ISO 3166 code: IN-HR
- Vehicle registration: HR-49
- Website: haryana.gov.in

Pinjore is a town in Panchkula district in the Indian state of Haryana. This residential 'township', located close to Panchkula, Chandigarh and Solan, is set over 1,800 feet above the sea level in a valley, overlooking the Sivalik Hills. Pinjore is known for Pinjore Gardens, Asia's best 17th Century Mughal garden, and the Hindustan Machine Tools (HMT) factory.

== History ==
=== Etymology ===
The town is named after the five Pandava brothers from Mahabharta, who during the time of their exile had stayed here for some time, hence the name Panchpura which later got corrupted to its current form, Pinjore.

=== Panchpura baoli ===
Panchpura baoli, a step well has an inscription. Alexander Cunningham, founding Director-general of ASI, decipher the worn out letters of Pinjore Baoli inscription, which mentions that the old name of the place was Panchpura. This inscription in the Pinjore Baoli ('Baoli' means "step well") described this place as Panchpura (now known by the shorter name Pinjore).

=== Prehistoric Stone Age era ===
Neolithic Stone Age (7000 BCE - 5500 BCE) find were excavated from the banks of the stream (paleochannel of Saraswati river) flowing through HMT complex, by the Guy Ellcock Pilgrim who was a British geologist and palaeontologist, who discovered 150,000 year old prehistoric human teeth and part of a jaw denoting that the ancient people, who were intelligent hominins dating as far back as 150,000 ybp Acheulean period, lived in Pinjore region near Chandigarh. Quartzite tools of Lower Paleolithic period were excavated in this region extending from Pinjore in Haryana to Nalagarh (Solan district in Himachal Pradesh.

=== Early medieval era ===
Some parts of current Pinjore town are situated atop an early medieval era mound. Artifacts belonging to 9th century CE to 12th century CE, which show the development and diversity of Hinduism and Jainism, were excavated from here. These include ornamental structural pieces, pillars, sculptures and inscriptions; two figures of Ayudha Puras, fragments of a colossal image of Vishnu, statue of Shiva, another four armed Shiva, large head of Bhairava (Hindu tantric deity), Kubera, seated Ganesha, head of Surya (sun god), Shakti images of Saivi (feminine form of Shiva), Durga, Parvati, Chamunda, standing Tirthankaras, another headless Tirthankara statue and other minor sculptures. Some of these have been displayed in the Bhima Devi Temple, the old temple was destroyed by the Islamic invaders and the present 8-11th CE temple is likely built on the same place under the old name, and the nearby ancient baoli still has old Hindu pillars.

The excavation of the ancient temple in 1974 was a historic discovery linking the antiquarian finds to the establishment of the temple to the period between 8th and 12th centuries of Gurjar Pratihara School of Art. The excavations have revealed five ancient plinths or pedestals and over 100 beautiful sculptures. The direction of these plinths indicate that the temple was stylized to the Panchayatan group of temples, where the main shrine is surrounded by four subsidiary shrines, which is contemporaneous to the temples of Khajuraho and Bhubaneshwar. Erotic images of the Bhima Devi temple contemporary to Khajuraho temples, have earned it a nickname of Khajuraho of North India. In keeping with Hindu tradition of temple architecture, the outer walls of the temple complex are adorned with statues Ashta-Dikpalas like, Indra, Agni, Vayu, Varun & Ishan in the cardinal directions. The idols of Hindu gods and goddesses such as Shiva, Parvati, Vishnu, Ganesha and Kartikeya have been unearthed and most of them are now displayed in the museum (spread over an area of 8 acres (3.2 ha)) here. From these findings, the Archaeological Department has conjectured that the main deity at the temple may have been of Lord Shiva.

=== Late medieval era ===
In 1254 CE, Sultan Nasiruddin Mahmud (grandson of Iltutmish) captured and plundered the area around Pinjore, as recorded in Minhaj-ud-din bin Siraj-ud-din's Tabaqat-i Nasiri. In 1399 CE, Pinjore was once again plundered by the forces of Timur on his way back from Delhi.

== Historic places ==
=== Bhima Devi temple ===
There is an ancient temple adjoining Pinjore gardens. The temple is named Bhima Devi Temple Site Museum. It consists of various erotic statues of ancient deities. The temple contains some statues of Lord Shiva in his Nataraja form. The temple has been made into an open air museum acceccible to public. No ticket is required for entering the temple. It was constructed between 8th and 12th century AD. It is under protection of Haryana government.

=== Pinjore Garden ===
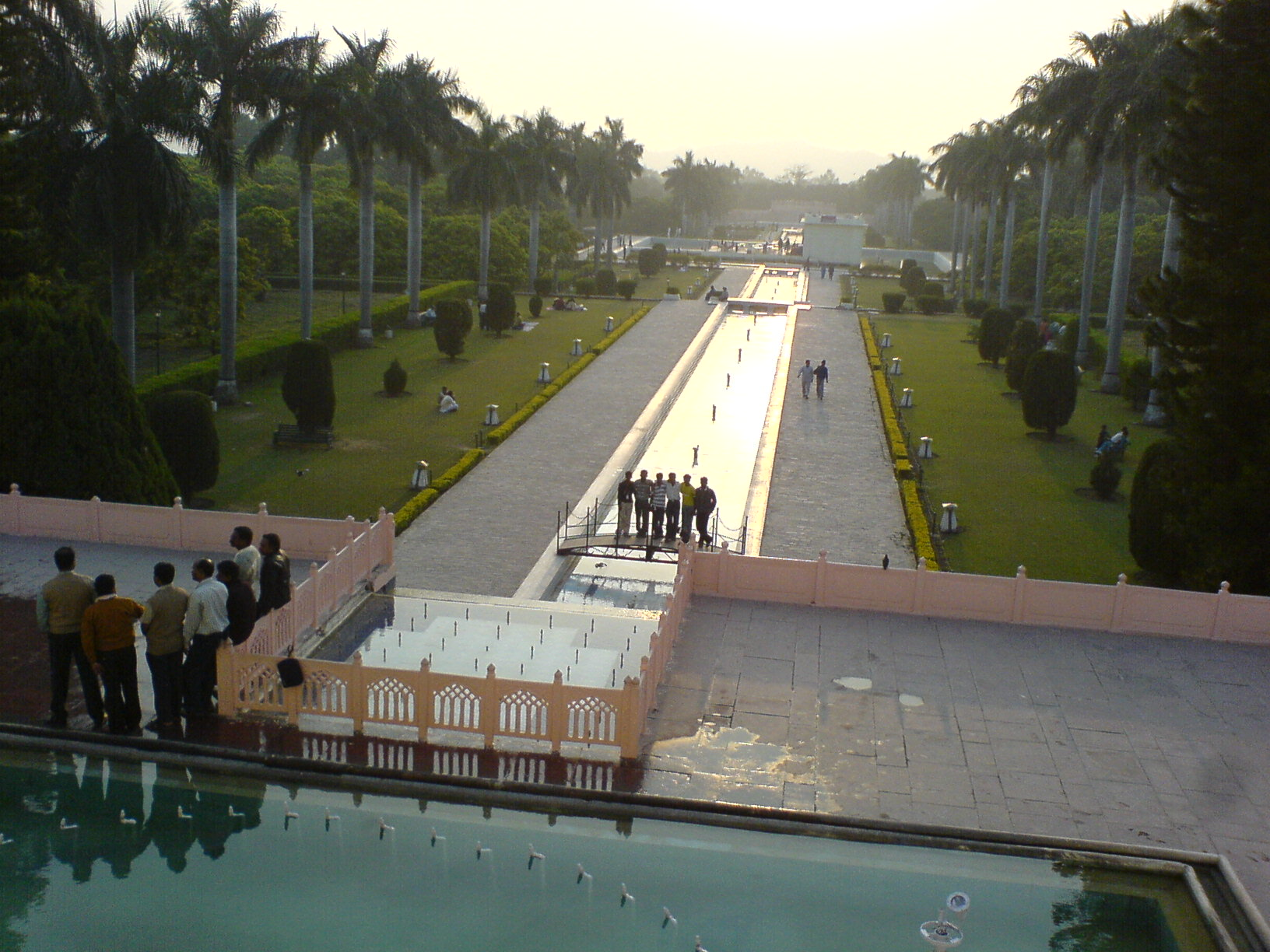
Rajasthani Mughal Gardens in Pinjore in Haryana

Pinjore Gardens, also called Yadavindra Gardens, represent one of the most travelled excursions from Chandigarh. Located at Pinjore, in the state of Haryana, they fall at a distance of about 22 km from the 'City Beautiful', on the Chandigarh-Kalka Road. The gardens lie at the foothills of the lower Shivalik ranges and stands as an apt example of the Mughal Garden style. Spread over an area of 100 acres, Pinjore Garden serve as the venue of the annual Mango Festival. The gardens house a mini zoo, historic places, Japanese garden, nursery and a number of picnic spots. According to the Hindu Mythology, the Pandava Brothers rested here during their exile.

==== History ====
Early in the 17th century, Nawab Fidai Khan, a reputed architect and the cousin of Mughal Emperor Aurangzeb, made the design for the Pinjore Gardens. At that time, the Nawab was the Governor of the Province and during one of his tours, he happened to visit the Pinjore valley. He was so enchanted with the beauty of the place that he thought of making a beautiful garden there and this is how the concept of the gardens came into being. The Nawab designed the garden as per the classical Charbagh pattern and introduced a central waterway in the area. He planned both sides of the waterway to be planted with the patches of green bordered with flowers, along with cover the entire place with a number of trees, like traditional palm, cypress and magnolia.

While Pinjore Gardens were still being created, goiter struck the women of the place. The courtiers of the Nawab immediately left the place, which forced him to quit as well. The palace later fell first under the reign of Raja of Sirmaur and finally, in 1775 AD, under Maharaja Amar Singh of Patiala. The latter consolidated Pinjore to his lands. He had a great admiration for the beauty engulfed in the garden and used to visit the place frequently. Amar Singh is credited with to improve the garden manifold. In 1966, Haryana was declared as an independent state and Pinjore Garden was handed over to it. Today, the garden continues to be one of the prime attractions of Haryana.

==== Features ====
Pinjore Garden is built in the typical Mughal style. It has a sloping ground and is adorned with fountains and grand pavilions. However, it differs from the other Mughal Gardens in respect that the seven terraces at Pinjore, instead of ascending, descend into a distance, creating a magical sight. The garden is full of varied species of beautiful, aromatic flowering plants, big trees, mango orchards, litchi orchards and several shrubs. The garden presents cool, shady walks and flagged pathways, which run to the reaches of the creeper-covered walls.

Recently, the end structure of the doorway was made into a disc-like open-air theatre. The outer wall of the garden is suggestive of the fort walls, which has now all around dieter pavilions housing the zoo. There is a watercourse traipsing from level to level. The arched balconies and fountains, green lawns surrounding the watercourse, pools, shady walks and flowerbeds, and descending terraces are all carefully placed to give a scenic effect.

Besides the greenery and nature, one can find other attractions within Yadavindra Gardens, like a mini zoo, historic places, Japanese garden, nursery, and a number of picnic spots. The gardens are brightly illuminated at night. There is a Jalmahal within the garden, which is presently used as a restaurant. The garden is open from 7am to 10pm. The entry ticket for the garden is Rs.25 per head. Special programs are organized in the garden during the festivals, like Baisakhi and Mango Festival, which attract visitors from every corner of the country.

=== Kaushalya dam ===
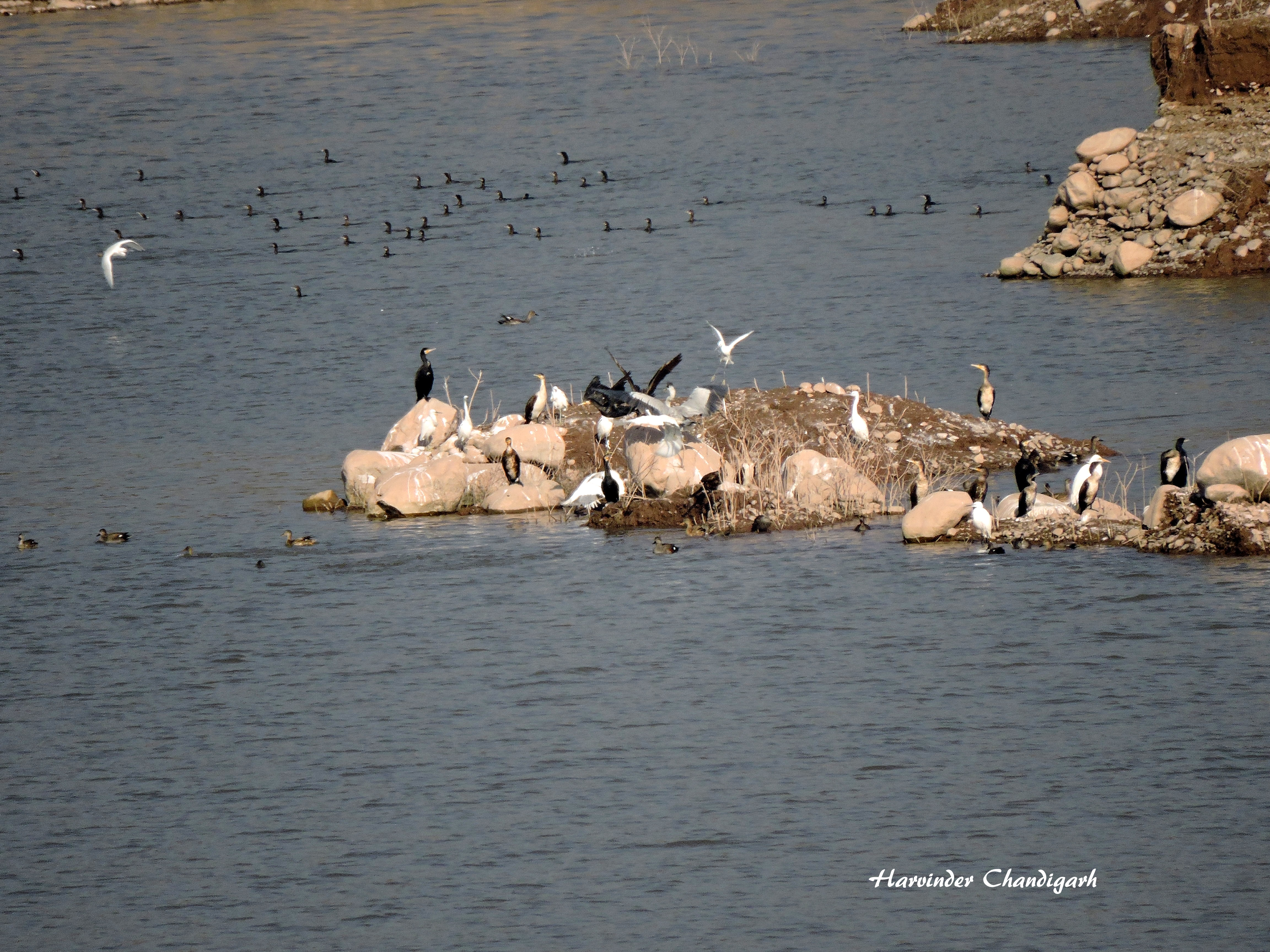
Migratory birds at Kaushalya dam

Kaushalya Dam is an earth-filled barrage dam on Kaushalya river in Pinjore. It is an important wetland that is home of many endangered migratory birds.

== Ecology ==
=== Climate ===
The average temperatures for summers and winters are 35 and 18 degree Celsius respectively, with rainfall concentrated over the summer months of July, August and September.

=== Wildlife ===
The Indian Flying Fox can be seen at the Yadavindra Gardens enclosure and entrance. Hundreds of these bats can be seen roosting during the day in the taller trees in the compound. At the border which divides Kalka-Pinjore Indian peafowl can be seen in the woods during monsoon season.

==== Jatayu Conservation Breeding Centre ====
- Jatayu Conservation Breeding Centre, Pinjore is a breeding centre for the critically endangered Indian vulture. It is present within Bir Shikargah Wildlife Sanctuary.
- News article about endangered species of vulture.

==== Bir Shikargah Wildlife Sanctuary ====
Bir Shikargah Wildlife Sanctuary is a wildlife sanctuary present in Pinjore spread over an area of 767.30 hectares (1,896.0 acres). It also houses Vulture Conservation and Breeding Centre. It contain a number of animals including Indian leopard, Asiatic elephant, Chital (spotted deer), Sambar deer, Wild boar, Rhesus macaque, Gray langur, Striped hyena, Indian jackal, Jungle cat, Indian gray mongoose, Indian fox and Indian jackal.

== Demographics ==
As of 2011 India census, Pinjore had a population of 35,912. Males constitute 54% of the population and females 46%. Pinjore has an average literacy rate of 76%, higher than the national average of 59.5%: male literacy is 80%, and female literacy is 72%. In Pinjore, 13% of the population is under 6 years of age.

Religions in Pinjore
Religion	Percent
Hindus	80.39%
Sikhs	15.45%
Muslims	3.14%
Christians	0.79%
Others	0.24%

== Transportation ==
=== Air ===
The nearest international airport is Chandigarh Airport and Indira Gandhi International Airport, New Delhi. Chandigarh is a 50-minute flight from Delhi.

=== Road ===
Pinjore can be reached by road from Delhi via the Sonepat Bypass. Volvo Coach, Deluxe, Semi-Deluxe and Express buses are also available from Inter-State Bus Terminal (ISBT), New Delhi to Chandigarh and vice versa every hour from 05:00 hrs to midnight. Ordinary buses ply every 10 minutes.

=== Rail ===
The Chandigarh/Kalka train stops in Kalka, and is a 4-hour journey from New Delhi.

== Education ==
Schools in Pinjore city are:

- Government Senior Secondary School, Pinjore
- Ajad Public School
- Alpine School
- City Public School, Saini Mohalla Pinjore
- DAV Public School, Pinjore
- Delhi Public School, Pinjore Ishar Nagar, Himshikha
- JB Smart Kids Public School, Shiv Colony
- JP Gurukul High School, Bitna colony
- New India Public School, Ratpur colony
- Noble High School, Pinjore
- Paragon Public School, Shiv colony, Bitna road
- PC Senior Secondary School
- Sapient Public School
- St. Vivekanand Millennium School, HMT Township, Pinjore
- The Education Tree School, Pragati Vihar, Opp. Dharampur, Pinjore

== See also ==
- Panchkula
- Chandigarh
- Kalka
- Asigarh Fort at Hansi
- Nahar Singh Fort at Ballabhgarh in Faridabad district
- Haryana Tourism
- Himshikha
- List of Monuments of National Importance in Haryana
- List of State Protected Monuments in Haryana
- List of National Parks & Wildlife Sanctuaries of Haryana, India
