= Speaking Archaeologically =

Indian archaeological education group

- Founded: June 1, 2015
- Founder: Shriya Gautam
- Services: Archaeological training Educational workshops Educational seminars Conferences; Cultural activities
- Fields: Archaeology
- Key people: Lyn Pease; Max Zeronian Dalley; Catherine Holtham-Oakley; Molly Lockeyear

Speaking Archaeologically is an archaeological education group, based in India. Founded by Shriya Gautam—alongside colleagues Lyn Pease, Catherine Holtham-Oakley, Max Zeronian-Dalley and Molly Lockeyear–in June 2015, it focuses on the documentation of neglected and forgotten archaeological sites, object analysis, and rescue archaeology.

== History ==
Gautam founded Speaking Archaeologically in June 2015, after having received an email from a student of MCM DAV College, Chandigarh: "[the student] wanted to be an archaeologist and asked me to guide her. That rang a bell and I realised I don’t want more people to be led in the dark for a profession that they want to pursue." Speaking Archaeologically started out as a Facebook Page, and featured photographs and blog posts about neglected sites and privately owned archaeologically significant objects. It then branched out into facilitating archaeological research, especially with respect to sites and objects which have not been previously documented or adequately researched about. Currently, it is involved with documenting, recording and publishing the research undertaken by its students and research interns on a pan-India basis, which is made public through its various interfaces including its eponymous Research Journal and YouTube Channel.

== Volunteering and public involvement ==
=== Citizen Archaeology ===
The group launched its first public involvement drive shortly after its foundation, aiming to engage the general public to "narrate the story past has to tell us." Dubbed Citizen Archaeology, it was launched on Twitter and Facebook simultaneously, directed at both academics as well as amateurs with an interest in history. Subsequently, the group expanded to Instagram and Pinterest with the aim of involving more photographers and popularising its own site covers as well as creating awareness.

In June 2016, Citizen Archaeology evolved into a membership option for students and travel bloggers, who wished to publish their photographs with the group and host their travelogues on the group's blog. In 2017, a vlogging or video blogging option was extended to the members, with the aim of hosting it on the Speaking Archaeologically YouTube channel.

Research Wing

The Research Wing functions under the organization since it was founded in 2015. It aims to train students in research writing and the basics of research techniques in archaeology, museology and archaeological methods. It is directed at academics with an interest in history and archaeology.

The Research Wing has a membership option for students after attempting an entrance test. The Wing conducts special lectures, workshops and seminars for the students as a part of the course. It welcomed its first set of members in 2015 and in the subsequent years students are accepted into the wing annually. Members carry out research on a wide range topics every month. Papers written by the interns at the Research Wing are also published in the Speaking Archaeologically Journal and have been presented at various national and international conferences.

Art Wing

The Art Wing was started in 2019, with students both from the Research Wing and outside. It comprises students skilled in making archaeological drawings and illustrations. Skhédios 2019, was an art-based Archaeological Illustration Workshop-cum-Competition, where fine arts students were taught the techniques of Archaeological Illustrations for Sculptures.

Workshop Wing

Workshops, seminars and lectures are organised by the group where members get to interact with professionals from different fields of history and archaeology. The wing was started in 2016, where members were recruited in the Government Museum and Art Gallery, Chandigarh.

=== Introductory seminars and workshops ===
In October 2015, the first Introductory Seminar to Speaking Archaeologically was held in MCM DAV College for Women, Chandigarh followed by a similar event in DAV College, Chandigarh, where the aims and objectives of the group were highlighted in front of the staff and students, so that more people could participate. A third Introductory Seminar was held in December 2015, in Army Public School at Ferozepur, Punjab, to emphasize the importance of archaeology among young students.

Speaking Archaeologically also organised two workshops in 2015: one focusing on the object analysis of British Indian Coinage and Coinage of Indian Princely States., and another on Medivial Indian miniature paintings.

In January 2016, a Workshop on using Philately as a Source of Historic Information was held in Chandigarh. In March 2016, MCM DAV College for Women invited Speaking Archaeologically to host a Workshop on the Ethnoarchaeological History of Silk. These were followed by a workshop on Medieval Indian Coinage Handling and Studying African Woodwork with respect to the Bembe tribe.

=== Membership ===
In November 2015, Speaking Archaeologically first welcomed Volunteers for its Research Wing from schools and colleges across North India. These were honorary members, who were taught the basics of research techniques in archaeology, museology, and archaeological planning. In June 2016, a Member Recruitment Drive was held in Government Museum & Art Gallery, Chandigarh, where new volunteers were recruited for the Research Wing, Citizen Archaeology, and for Workshop attendance. As of 2022, 20 Research Wing Members carry out research on a variety of topics every month.

=== Heritage Walks ===
Since 2022, Speaking Archaeologically has been hosting free, open-for-all walks at heritage monuments in various cities of the country. The initiative began with an aim to spark dialogue about conservation and protection of local heritage among people from different fields. The effort was to not only create awareness, but to also bring positive change in the conservation of heritage. So far, walks have been conducted at various sites in Delhi, Mumbai, Pune, and Chandigarh.

== Seminars and lectures ==
The first Speaking Archaeologically seminar was held in the Government Museum & Art Gallery, Chandigarh, in November 2015 which dealt with Palaeolithic Archaeology and Human Evolution. An on-site lecture on Panchayatna Temples was held in Bhima Devi Temple Complex in Pinjore in February 2016, which dealt with Temple archaeology, architectural styles and site documenting and mapping. In July 2016, an object study session was held in the Himachal State Museum, Shimla which was followed by a series of Sculpture sessions held for all Volunteers in the three states of Punjab, Haryana and Himachal Pradesh, between December 2016 and January 2017.

In October 2016, a live session was held in real time by Max Zeronian Dalley on Crusader Castles and their associated archaeology.

In March 2017, Speaking Archaeologically documented sites and participated in live object analysis sessions from various archaeological places in England, especially Calleva Atrebatum in Silchester, the Old Winchester Hill, Wolvercote and Avebury Stone Circle. The Members also got to interact with various archaeologists from Butser Ancient Farm, University of Oxford and University of Kent through real-time Q&A sessions.

In June 2017, the Research Wing members undertook a three-day archaeological expedition to Kasauli Hills for the purpose of observing old architectural techniques and understanding the hazards development poses on archaeological sites.

=== Publications ===
As of 2022, Speaking Archaeologically has been publishing eponymous journals containing papers written by research interns and members of the Research Wing as well as outside contributors, with the aim of producing high-quality archaeological research at par with International Standards.

The first volume of the Speaking Archaeologically Journal features varied review papers authored by interns from seasons one and two. Volume II covered two ambitious projects taken up by the group in different parts of the country- the Baolis of Delhi and the Stupas of east and west Punjab. Each paper was a result of extensive research and underwent thorough scrutiny. The third volume covered the organisation’s biggest and most extensive archaeological study at the Bhima Devi Temple, Pinjore. It contains a collection of studies based on the site, exploring various aspects of the temple’s history and material culture. The latest publication, Volume IV, highlighted the issues faces by archaeological sites in different parts of the country, and discussed key aspects of the field of heritage management. Volume V, scheduled to be released in 2022, will touch upon contemporary techniques of conservation using policies like Corporate Social Responsibility (CSR) and explore new avenues of public and digital archaeology.

Various research projects by the Research Wing and the Panel of Speaking Archaeologically have been both published and presented in national and international conferences. In 2021, six students of the Research Wing, including two interns, presented their research work undertaken at Speaking Archaeologically at the Cambridge Annual Student Archaeology Conference.

=== IGTV Sessions ===
Members of the Research Wing have been hosting live sessions on Instagram since 2021. These sessions are conducted in accordance with the topic of the research that is issued and give in-depth reviews and insight into the subject matter in question.

== Projects ==
In June 2016, an Art Revival Workshop was hosted by Speaking Archaeologically. The workshop was organized with the motive of spreading inspiration for restoration of Raja Dhaulpur House in Kandaghat, erstwhile Kohsitan of Patiala which is now the Government Degree College, Kandaghat, Solan District. The College Management Team and Speaking Archaeologically jointly held an art competition in order to form a team of mural restorers for the purpose.

=== Baolis of Delhi Project ===
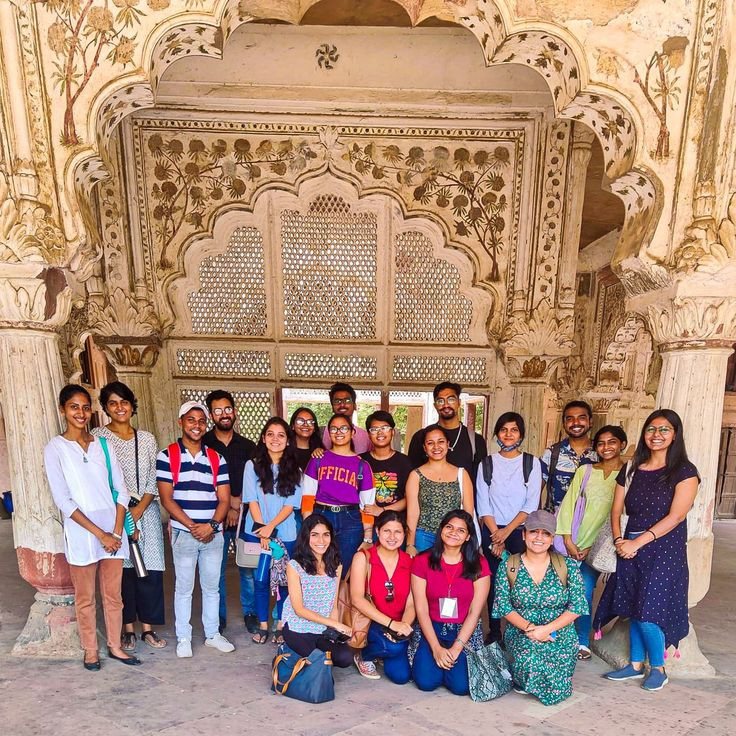
Baolis of Delhi project undertaken by Speaking Archaeologically members

The Baolis of Delhi Project was an exclusive research and video documentation project conducted by the Delhi Chapter of the Speaking Archaeologically Research Wing under the direction of Simran Kaur Saini, co-directed by Medha Sharma. The project documented all the Medieval Stepwells in the Delhi-Gurugram region and evaluated their conditions, the scope for adaptive reuse, and the conservation of these structures. The results were published in the Speaking Archaeologically Journal Volume II and documentation was simultaneously released in the form of short documentaries on the organization's YouTube Channel

=== Bhima Devi Project ===
The Bhima Devi Project is one of the most ambitious Archaeological Research Projects of the Speaking Archaeologically Research Wing. It was carried out for over 3 years, from 2017 to 2020, with a preliminary site survey beginning as early as 2015. At the helm of the Project was Shriya Gautam herself and it was co-directed by Divyansh Thakur. The results of the fieldwork were published in the Speaking Archaeologically Research Journal Volume III.

=== Stupas of East and West Punjab ===
The Stupas of East and West Punjab was the first International Documentation done by Speaking Archaeologically in August 2018, in association with scholars from the Qaid-i-Azam University, Islamabad, Pakistan. As a part of this project, eight stupas spread across East and West Punjab were documented and studied by the Research Wing Members and the results were published in the Speaking Archaeologically Journal Volume II.
