= Bhima Devi Temple Site Museum =

Bhima Devi Temple Complex
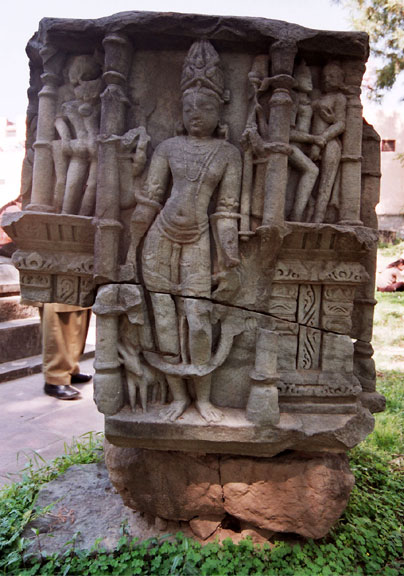

- Location in Haryana Bhima Devi Temple Site Museum (India)

Religion
- Affiliation: Hinduism
- Deity: Lord Shiva

Location
- Location: [chandigarh]
- State: Haryana
- Country: India
- Coordinates: 30.7967929°N 76.9144668°E

Architecture
- Type: Indian architecture
- Creator: Raja Ram Dev
- Completed: 8th to 12th century

The Bhima Devi Temple Complex, nicknamed Khajuraho of North India for its erotic sculptures, comprises the restored ruins of an ancient Hindu temple dating from between 8th and 11th century AD, together with the adjacent 17th-century Pinjore gardens (a variant of Mughal gardens), located in Pinjore town in Panchkula district of the state of Haryana, India. The old temple was destroyed by Islamic invaders and the present 8-11th CE temple is likely built on the same place under the old name, and the nearby ancient baoli still has old Hindu pillars. Bhimadevi belongs to the Shakti tradition that was derived from the Buddhist tantric goddess. Further, in the Devi Mahatmya it is said that in the Western Himalayas of Himachal Pradesh (Pinjore region adjoins Himachal Himalayas), Bhimadevi appeared in an enormous form of Bhimarupa (Bhima’s form) and gave protection to the sages (munis in Sanskrit). The site was worked upon extensively by the team of Speaking Archaeologically from 2017 to 2019, with preliminary survey beginning as early as in 2015 and the report was published as the Speaking Archaeologically Journal Volume III:Bhima Devi Project Edition in 2020.

The Bhima Devi temple was sculptured during the reign of Gurjara-Pratiharas. Most of the complex ruins comprising sculptures and architectural design, which were ruined during Mughal period under Aurangzeb, are of the times of the Gurjara-Pratiharas. Archaeological excavations done in 1974 revealed the temple, which was subsequently dated to 8th century to 11th century AD and declared as a protected monument under the ‘Punjab Ancient and Historical Monuments and Archaeological Sites and Remains Act-1964’. The unearthed findings cover over 100 antiquarian sculptures, apart from a layout plan indicating a five temples complex, including the main central shrine representing the Panchayatana architectural style, similar to the styles seen in the contemporaneous Khajuraho and Bhubaneshwar temples. The temple complex adjoins the Pinjore Gardens, also known as Mughal gardens built by Aurangzeb’s foster brother using much of the ruins of the Hindu temples destroyed by the Muslim invaders from the 13th century onwards till the 17th century.

Muslim invasions of Pinjore town started with Nasiruddin Mahmud (Iltumish's grandson) in 1254 AD, continued with other invaders like Timurlane and lasted till Governor of Sirhind Fidai Khan Koka’s (foster brother of Aurangzeb) onslaught in 1666. These islamist invasions were responsible for the wanton destruction of this ancient Hindu temple complex. The Pinjore gardens (now renamed as Yadvendra Gardens after Yadavindra Singh Maharaja of the former princely state of Patiala) developed in the 17th century, by Fidai Khan (who was also the architect), was reportedly constructed partly with ruins of the destroyed temple. This garden is considered as a lovely Mughal garden, one of the oldest in northern India.

An open-air museum with the Bhima Devi temple ruins (85% of the ancient sculptures have been aesthetically installed at different places of the open-air museum). Integrated with the Yadavindra Gardens, it has been developed with attractive modern illumination arrangements. The garden and the temple complex laid in an open-air museum are integrated through well laid out and well drained (to remove any water logging) pathways and the whole complex has been beautifully illuminated. A heritage train has been introduced to visit all the monuments and the gardens in the complex.

== Location ==
Pinjore, where the Bhimadevi temple complex is located, is approachable by road, rail and air from all parts of the country. It is well connected with Chandigarh, which is the capital region of both Haryana and Punjab states and a Union Territory administered by the Government of India, at a road distance of 20 kilometres (12 mi). It is 5 kilometres (3.1 mi) from Kalka, on the road to Shimla.

Its distance from other major cities is as follows: Panipat 57 km, Shimla 92 km, Kurukshetra 105 km, Ludhiana 123 km, Dehradun 165 km, Dharamshala 231 km, Amritsar 242 km, Hisar 240 km, Delhi 267 km, Agra 467 km and Khajuraho 886 km.

== History ==
The temple, located in Pinjore, is dated from archaeological excavations as an ancient historical and religious place. Archaeological excavations have revealed that this region, extending from Pinjore to Nalagarh, establishes earliest habitation by man to 1.5 million years ago. This is based on tools of Paleolithic period found in quartzite formations in the region.

Also, from the rock edicts found from the temple ruins in the area during excavations, it has been conjectured that they were constructed during the reign of Raja Ram Dev.

But Muslim invasions from 13th century onwards resulted in repeated destruction of the temple complex. The first act of depredation was carried out by Nasir-u-Din Mahmood, son of Iltutmish of the Slave Dynasty rule (1206-1290 AD) in the year 1254 A.D. Timurlane who invaded India in 1399 AD destroyed the temples further. This was followed by Changez Khan's destruction in 1507 A.D. The final total destruction of these Hindu temples was effected in 1661 by Muzzaffar Hussain, also known as Fidai Khan Koka, who was the foster brother of the infamous Mughal iconoclast badshah of Delhi Aurangzeb, Koka means foster brother to the king. Fidai Khan Koka was then Nawab (governor) of Sirhind who razed this temple and built the Pinjore gardens in the Islamic style using the ruins of Hindu temples he destroyed. Later in 1671, Fidai Khan Koka was appointed as governor of Lahore for the purpose of building Badshahi Mosque there, which was later conquered by the Sikh ruler Maharaja Ranjit Singh in 1799 who used that Badshahi Mosque built by Fidai Khan as stable for the horses.

== Temple complex ==
The temple complex comprises the ruins of the temple, aesthetically arranged in an open-air museum (patterned on the original Panchayatana layout) housing 80 pedestals fixed with the excavated sculptures, and the Pinjore gardens with which the temple complex is fully integrated (with 150 focus lights).

Some parts of current Pinjore town are situated atop an early medieval era mound. Artifacts belonging to 9th century CE to 12th century CE, which show the development and diversity of Hinduism, were excavated from here. These include ornamental structural pieces, pillars, sculptures and inscriptions; two figures of Ayudha Puras, fragments of a colossal image of Vishnu, statue of Shiva, another four armed Shiva, large head of Bhairava (hindu tantric deity), Kubera, seated Ganesha, head of Surya (sun god), Shakti images of Saivi (feminine form of Shiva), Durga, Parvati, Chamunda, standing Tirthankaras, another headless Tirthankara statue and other minor sculptures. Some of these have bene displayed in the Bhima Devi Temple Site Museum.

The excavation of the ancient temple in 1974 was a historic discovery linking the antiquarian finds to the establishment of the temple to the period between 8th and 12th centuries of Gurjara-Pratihara School of Art. The excavations have revealed five ancient plinths or pedestals and over 100 beautiful sculptures. The direction of these plinths indicate that the temple was stylized to the Panchayatan group of temples, where the main shrine is surrounded by four subsidiary shrines, which is contemporaneous to the temples of Khajuraho and Bhubaneshwar. Erotic images of the Bhima Devi temple contemporary to Khajuraho temples, have earned it a nickname of Khajuraho of North India. In keeping with Hindu tradition of temple architecture, the outer walls of the temple complex are adorned with statues Ashta-Dikpalas like, Indra, Agni, Vayu, Varun & Ishan in the cardinal directions. The idols of Hindu gods and goddesses such as Shiva, Parvati, Vishnu, Ganesha and Kartikeya have been unearthed and most of them are now displayed in the museum (spread over an area of 8 acres (3.2 ha)) here. From these findings, the Archaeological Department has conjectured that the main deity at the temple may have been of Lord Shiva.

Gray and green sandstone available locally in the region are the main source of material used to carve the stone sculptures. Archeologists have classified the sculptures under four categories, namely:

1. Sculptures of Hindu Gods & Goddesses,
2. Idols of Apsaras, attendants, Gandharvas and celestial musicians
3. Motifs of Animals
4. Erotic images of the contemporary times

The most outstanding sculpture displayed in the temple complex is that of Lord Shiva (see infobox), which has been described as in:

Sarma Bhanga (contraposto) bearing a high jata or juta, ear ornaments, ekavali, sacred thread, armlets, wristlets, long garland, dhoti secured by an elaborate girdle, etc, holding a trident with its upper portion damaged in the rear right hand and a snake in the back left. The proper right hand of the God is in Varadmudra, touching the head of a small human figure standing in tribhanga standing behind the bull at right of the God.

Splinters or pieces of Yama image in the form of "the head and Khajvanga in a pedimented rathika have also been deciphered and linked to an image of Yama found in Chandi Mandir, nearby."

A beautiful image of Varuna (as per Hinduism Varuna is the lord of water and sea, and the guardian of the western quarter) has been found here in a

standing pose in dvibhanga bearing a high jata or jita adorned with jewels and wearing the usual ornaments with proper right hand in a varada pose probably also with a rosary.

Pinjore gardens

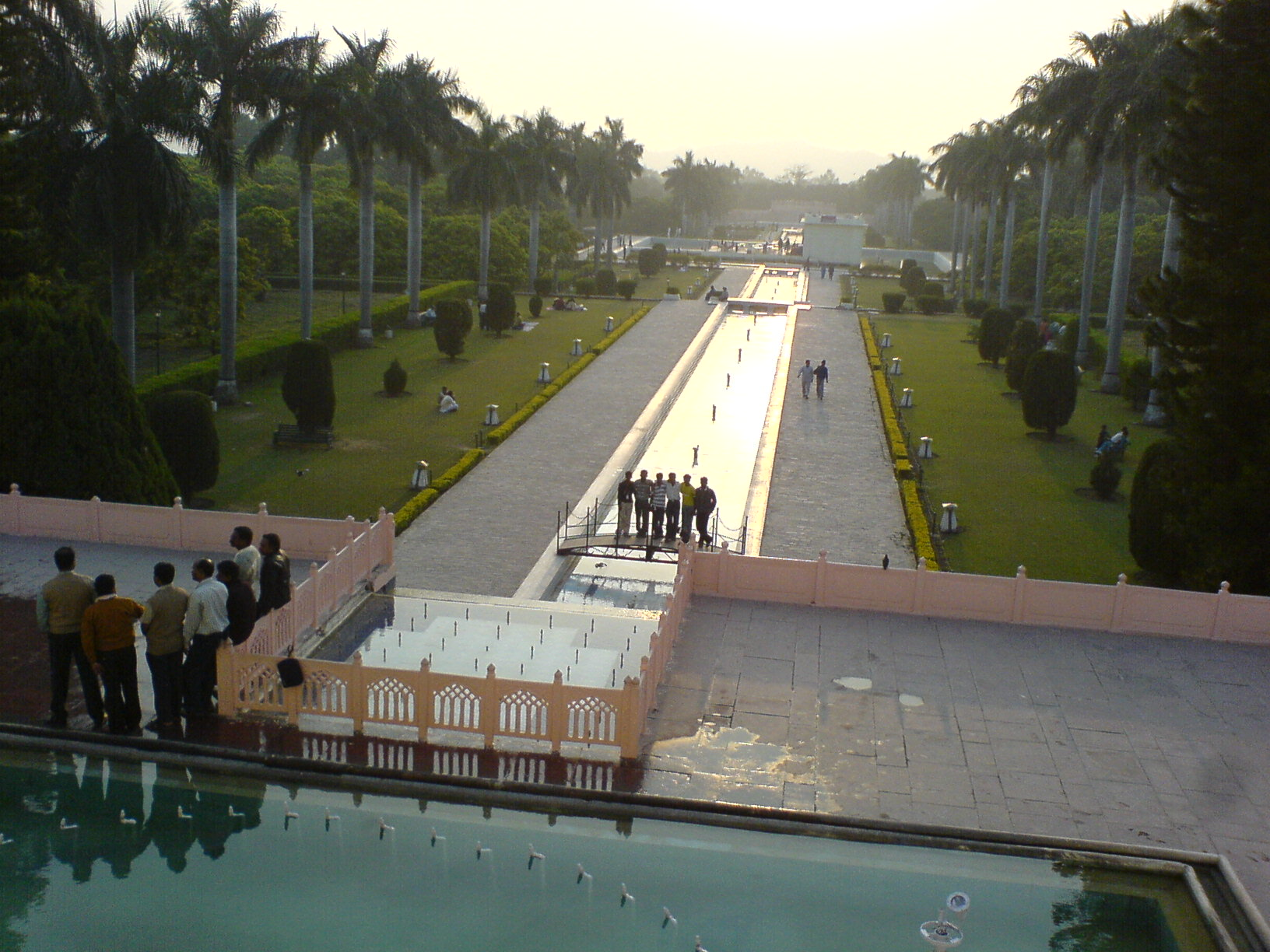
Pinjore Gardens Beauty to meet history at Bhima Devi museum in Yadvendra Gardens

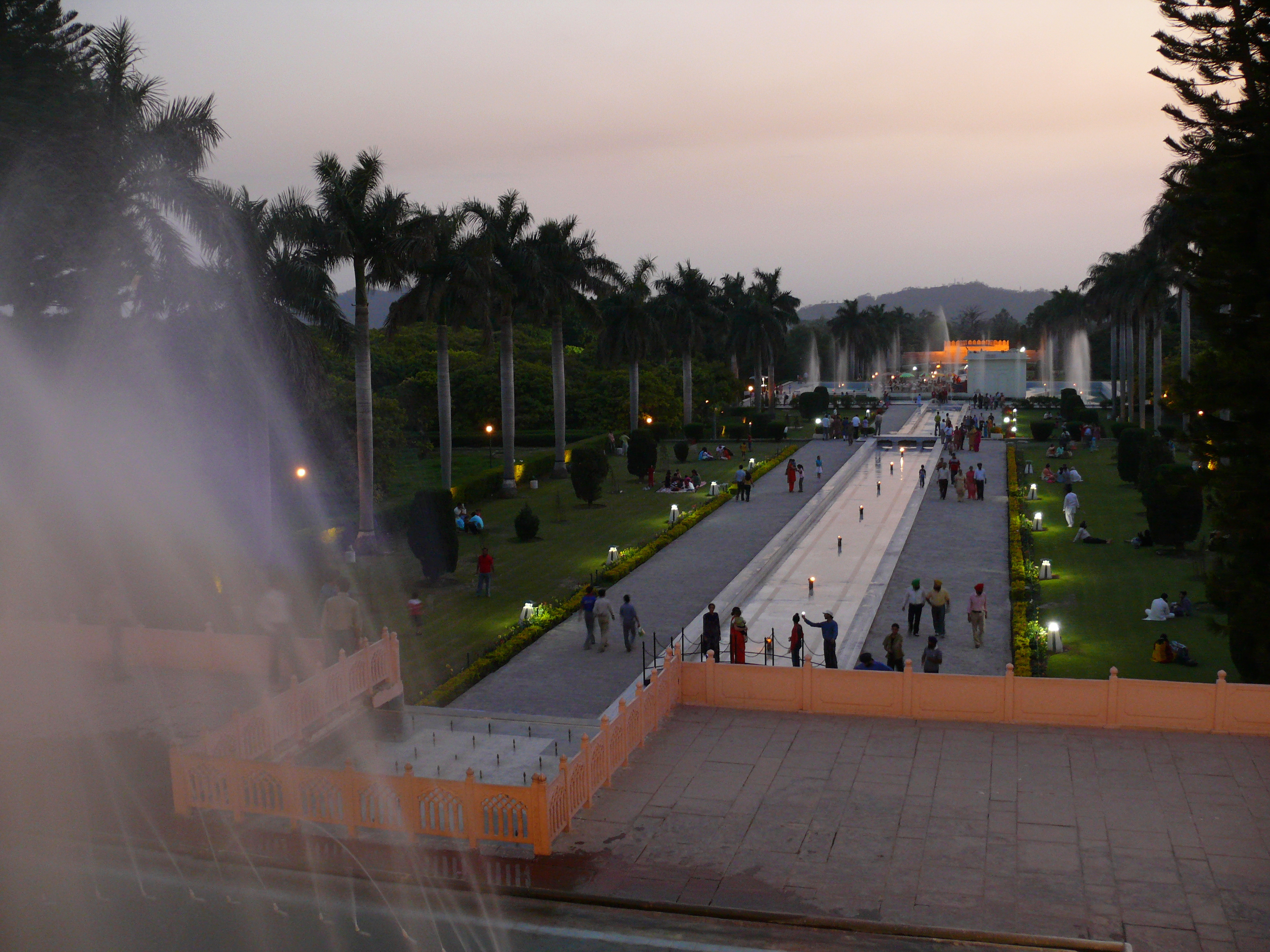
Pinjore Gardens at night

Pinjore Garden was created in the 17th century by Fidai Khan, the Governor of Sirhind who completely destroyed the adjacent ancient temple of Bhima Deva. In recent times, it has been renamed as 'Yadavindra Garden' in the memory of Maharaja Yadavindra Singh of the former princely state of Patiala. After it was initially built by Fidai Khan, the garden was refurbished by Yadevendra Singh and restored to its former splendour, since it had grown into a wild jungle after initially built due to long years of neglect.

The garden has been laid in seven terraces with the main gate of the garden opening into the highest first terrace which has a palace built in Rajasthani–Mughal style. It is called the "Shish Mahal" (Palace of Mirrors), which is adjoined by a romantic "Hawa Mahal" (Breezy Palace). The second terrace with arched doorways has the "Rang Mahal" (Palace of Colors) since it was brightly painted and decorated to be used to house the ruler's wives and mistresses. The third terrace has cypress trees and flowerbeds leading to dense groves of fruit trees. The next terrace has the "Jal Mahal" (palace of water) with a square fountain bed and a platform to relax. Fountains and tree groves are provided in the next terrace. The lowermost terrace has an open-air theatre, which is designed as a disc-like structure. A zoo adjoins the gardens.

Special festivals such as the Baisakhi (spring) festival in April and the Mango festival in June and July are major attractions at the gardens.

== Panchpura baoli ==
Pinjore town where the temple complex is located has historic link to the Pandavas, heroes of Mahabharata epic. An inscription in the Pinjore Baoli (‘Baoli’ means "step well") described this place as Panchpura (now known by the shorter name Pinjore). It is said that the Pandavas remained here for about one year on their way to the Himalayas to spend the forced exile period (agyaatvaas or living incognito) of 13 years. It is also said that the Pandavas worshipped goddess Mahakali here and performed yagna. Alexander Cunningham, founding Director-general of ASI, decipher the worn out letters of Pinjore Baoli inscription, which mentions that the old name of the place was Panchpura.

== Gallery ==
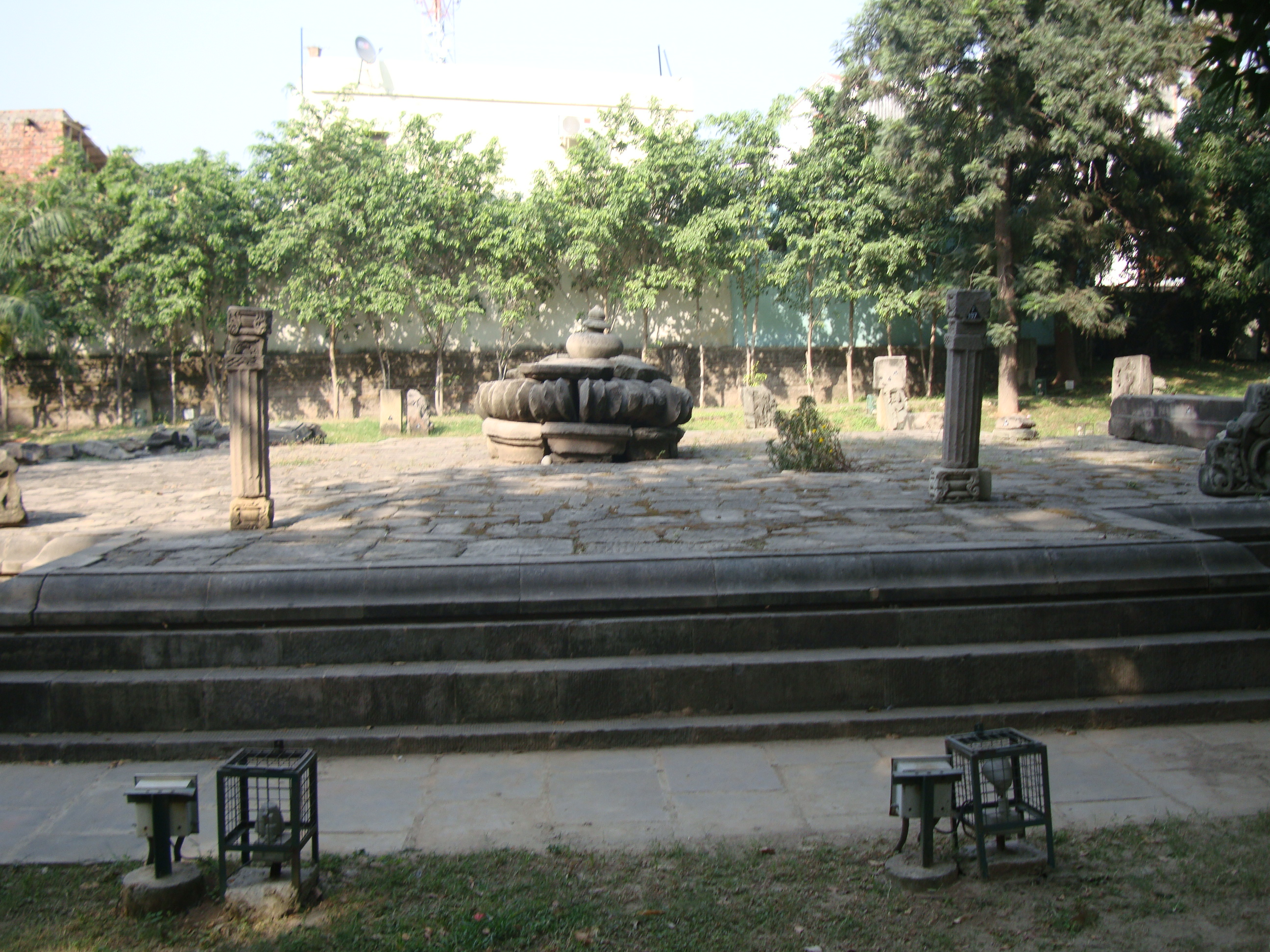

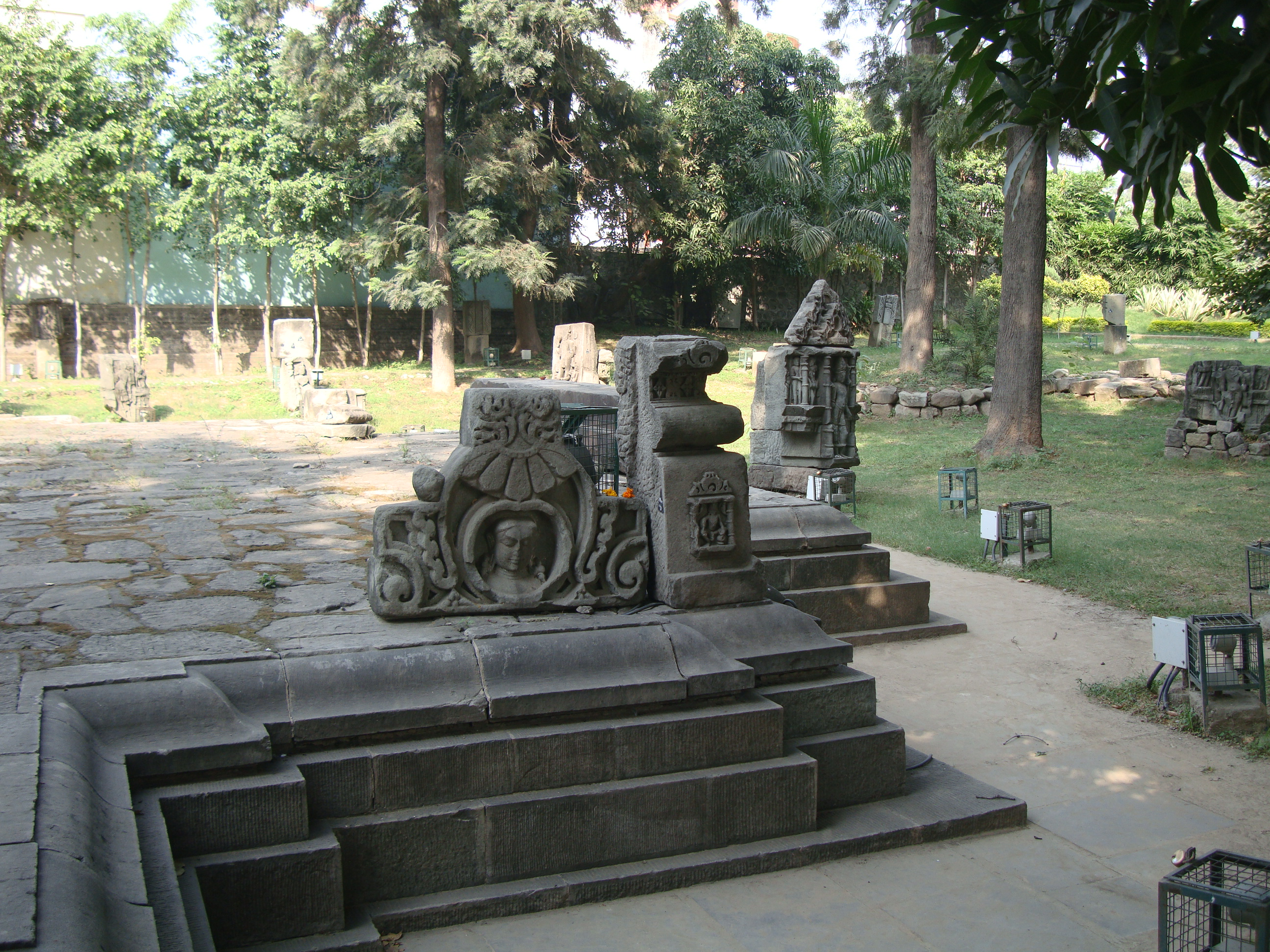

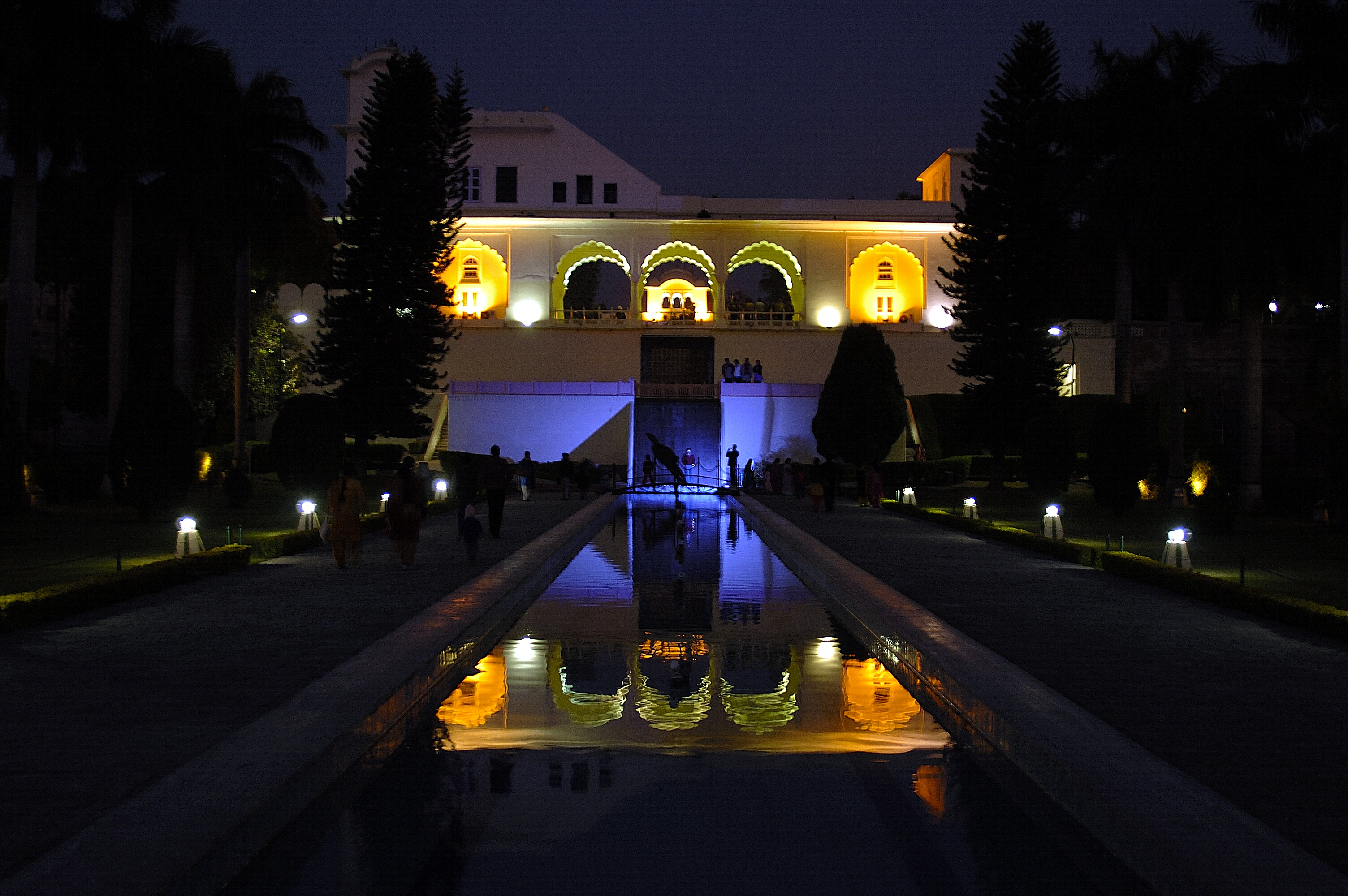

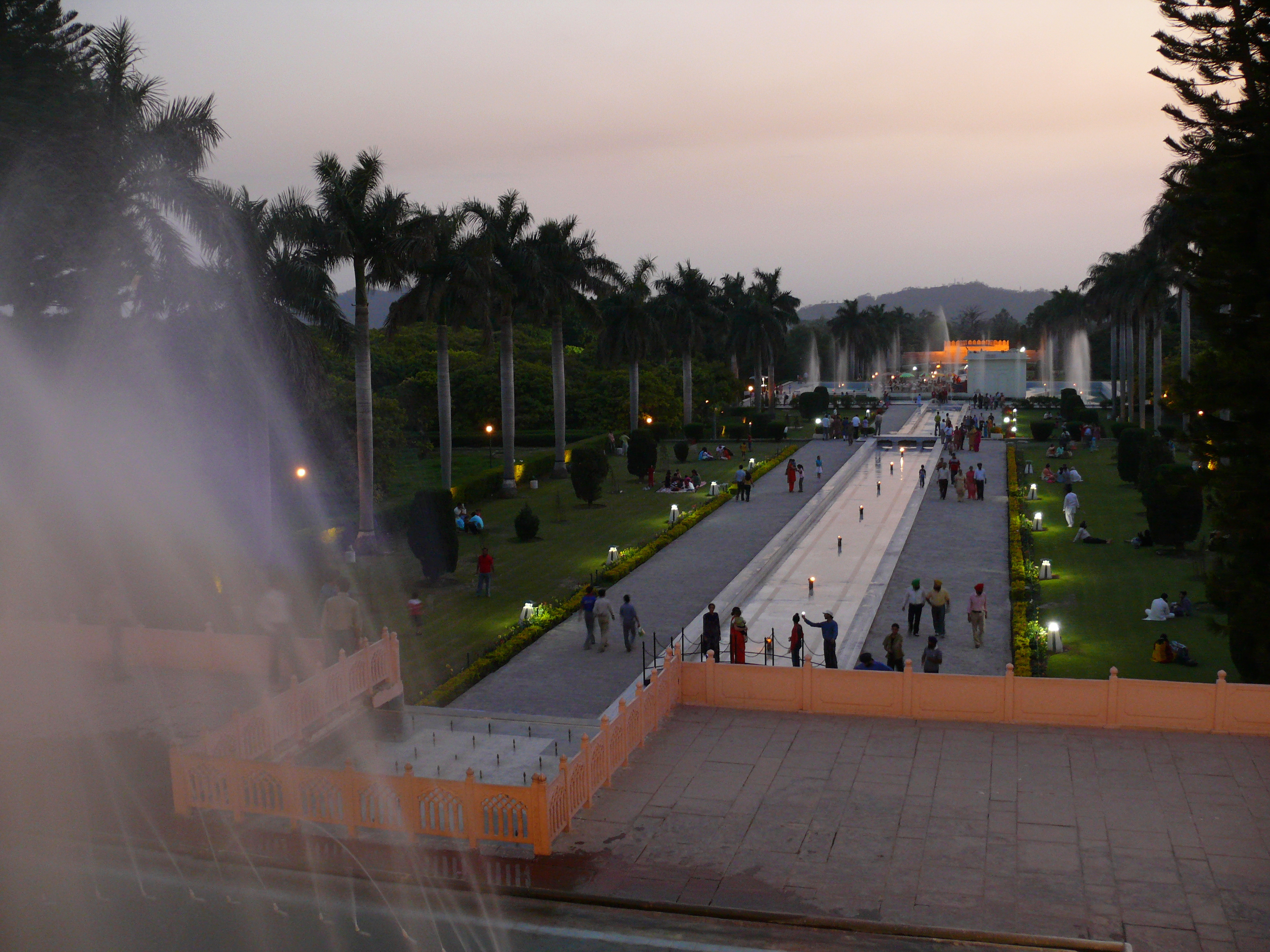

== See also ==
- List of Museums in Haryana
- Kalayat Ancient Bricks Temple Complex
- Khajuraho temples
- List of Monuments of National Importance in Haryana
- List of State Protected Monuments in Haryana
- List of Indus Valley Civilization sites in Haryana
- List of National Parks & Wildlife Sanctuaries of Haryana, India
- Haryana Tourism
