= Pandhurli =

Village in Maharashtra

- village
- Location in Maharashtra, India Pandhurli (India)
- Coordinates: 19.829052°N 73.854745°E
- Country: India
- State: Maharashtra
- Talukas: Sinnar
- District: Nashik
- Elevation: 651 m (2,136 ft)

Population (2011)
  - Total: 4,500

Languages
  - Official: Marathi
- Time zone: UTC+5:30 (IST)
- Postal code: 422502
- Telephone code: 02551
- Vehicle registration: MH-15

Pandhurli is a village and a municipal council in Sinnar taluka of Nashik district in the Indian state of Maharashtra.

== Geography ==
Pandhurli (Marathi-पांढुर्ली) is located at 19.829052°N 73.854745°E It has an average elevation of 562 metres (1843 feet). It lies 23 km southeast of Nashik city on the Nagpur–Aurangabad–Mumbai Highway.

== Demographics ==
As of 2001 India census, Pandhurli had a population of 4,500.
