= Gondeshwar Temple, Sinnar =

11th-12th century Shiva temple

Gondeshwar Temple
- गोंदेश्वर
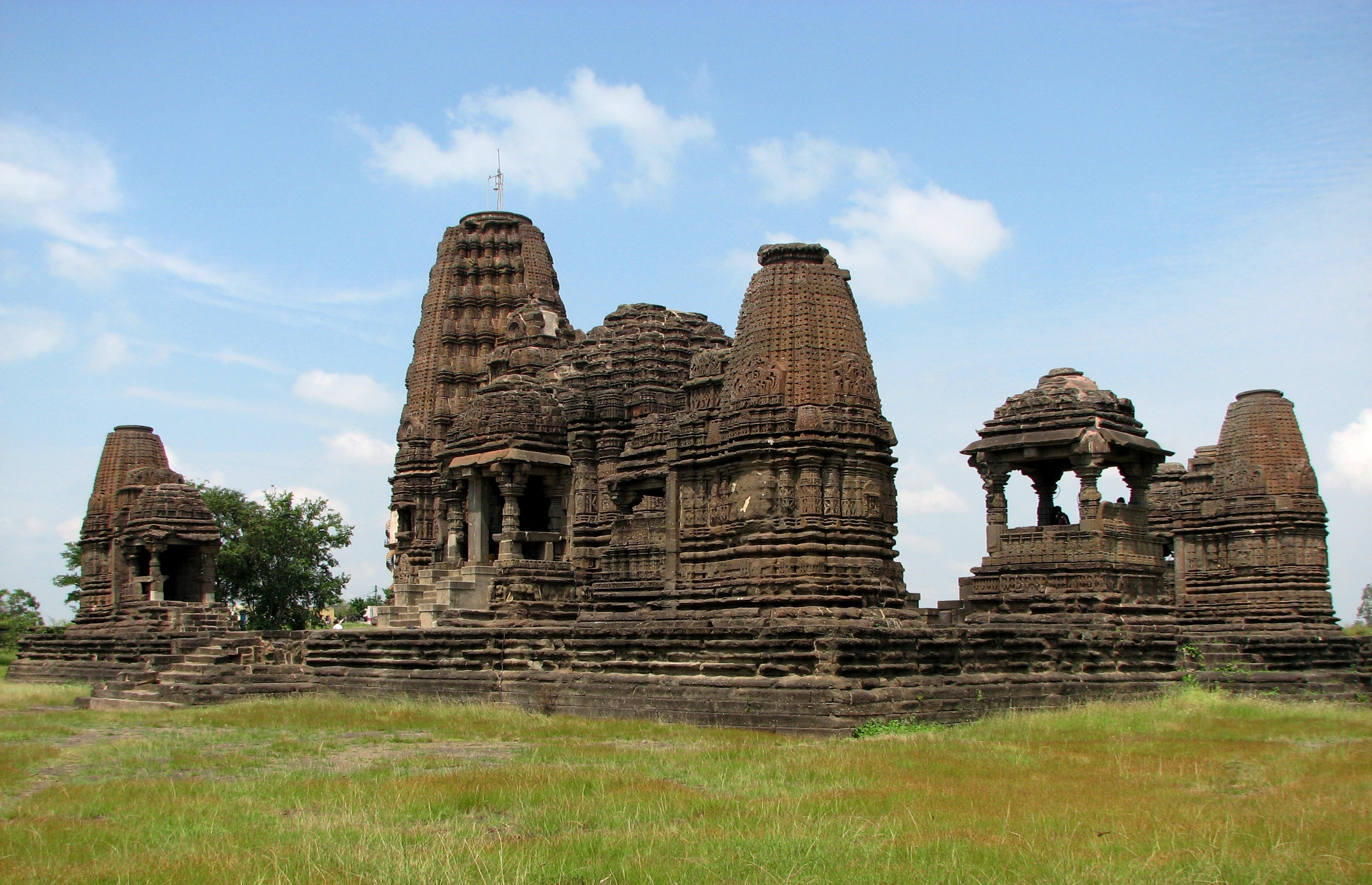

- Location in India

Religion
- Affiliation: Hinduism
- District: Nashik
- Deity: Shiva
- Festival: Maha Shivratri
- Governing body: Archaeological Survey of India (ASI)

Location
- Location: Sinnar
- State: Maharashtra
- Country: India
- Interactive map of Gondeshwar Temple
- Coordinates: 19.8514°N 74.0019°E

Architecture
- Style: Bhumija
- Established: 11th century
- Materials: Basalt

The Gondeshwar Temple (IAST: Gondeśvara) is an 11th-12th century Hindu temple located in Sinnar, a town in the Nashik district of Maharashtra, India. It features a panchayatana plan; with a main shrine dedicated to Shiva; and four subsidiary shrines dedicated to Surya, Vishnu, Parvati, and Ganesha.

== History ==
The Gondeshwar temple was built during the rule of the Seuna (Yadava) dynasty, and is variously dated to either the 11th or the 12th century. Sinnar was a stronghold of the dynasty during their pre-imperial period, and modern historians identify it with Seunapura, a town established by the Yadava king Seuna-chandra. According to local tradition, the town of Sinnar was established by the Gavali (that is, Yadava) chief Rav Singhuni, and the Gondeshvara temple was commissioned by his son Rav Govinda, at a cost of 200,000 rupees. According to another suggestion, the temple - also known as Govindeshvara (IAST: Govindeśvara) - was built by the Yadava feudatory Govinda-raja, but no historical evidence supports this suggestion.

== Architecture ==
The Gondeshwar temple is built in the Bhumija style, in form of a panchayatana complex, which features a main shrine surrounded by four subsidiary shrines. The temple is situated on a rectangular platform that measures 125 x 95 feet. The plan of the temple is very similar to that of the Ambarnath Shiva temple, but the sculptures on its exterior walls are of inferior quality than those of the Ambarnath temple. The temple complex was originally surrounded by a wall, which is now mostly destroyed. Udayesvara Temple also known as Neelkantheshwara temple in Udaipur, Madhya Pradesh also shares a similar design.

The main shrine is dedicated to Shiva, and contains a large linga. The shrine and the Nandi pavilion facing it are located on an elevated plinth. The mandapa (pavilion), which has porches on three sides, acts as the entrance to the temple. The shrine has a Nagara-style shikhara (tower), whose finial is no longer preserved. The walls of the temple depict scenes from the ancient epic Ramayana.

The subsidiary shrines are dedicated to Surya, Vishnu, Parvati, and Ganesha: all of them have a porch. They are rectangular in plan, and include a mandapa, an antarala (vestibule), and the garbhagriha (sanctum).

The temple in 1897

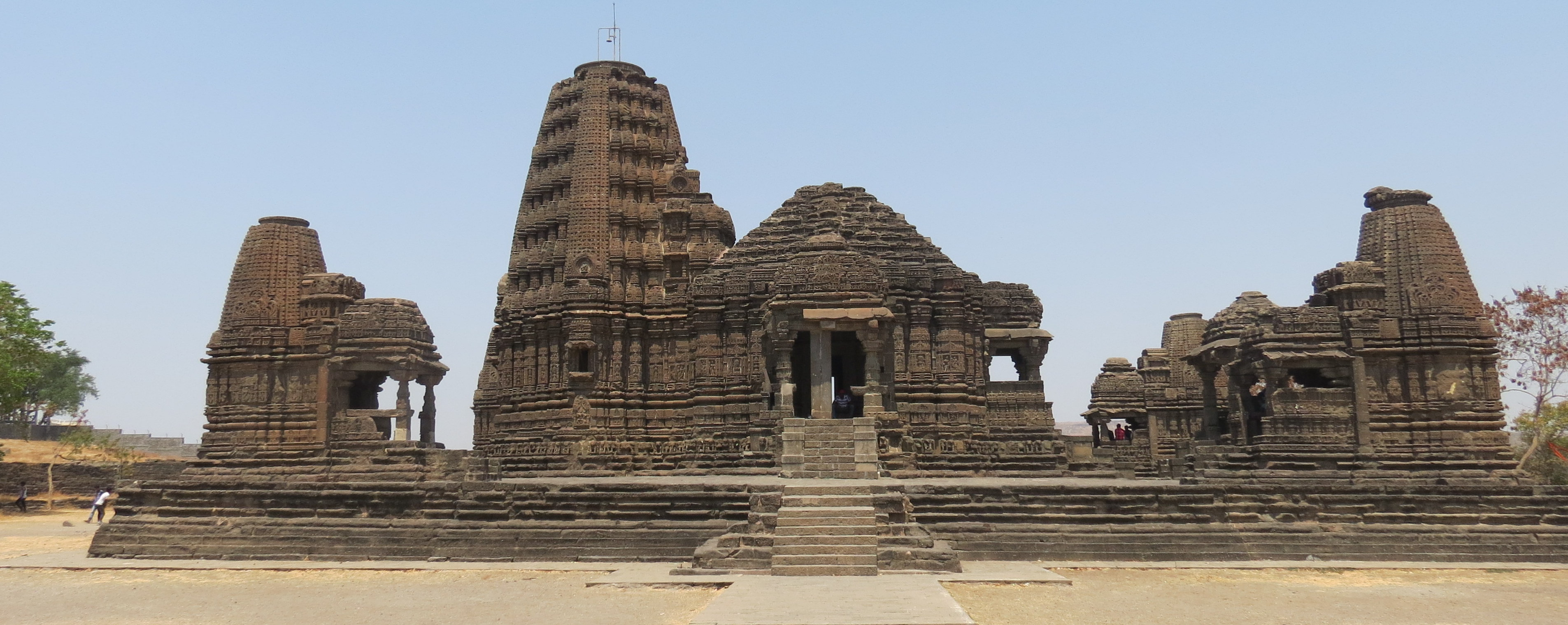
In 2017, with the finial lost

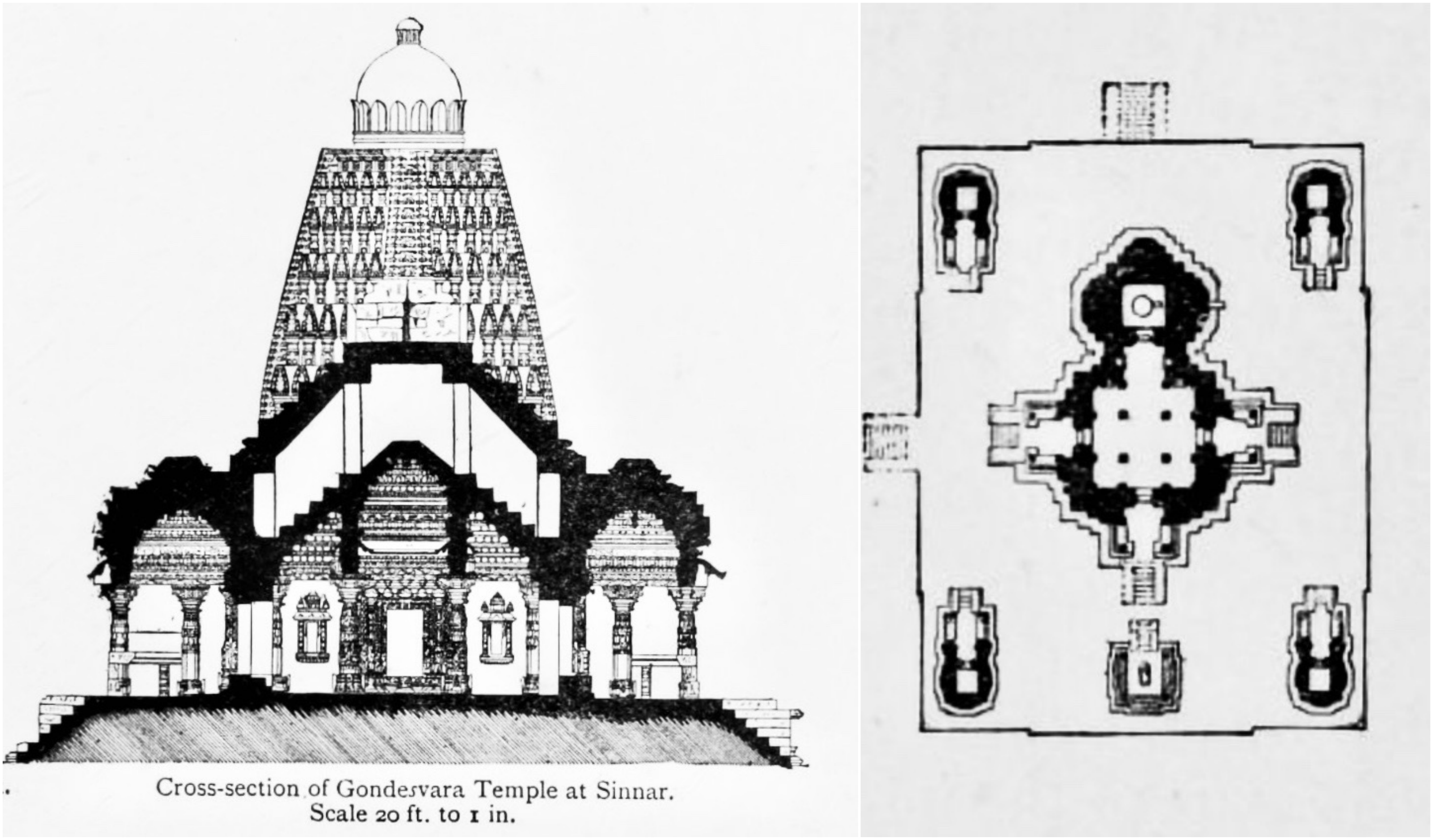
Cross section and plan
