= Gargoti Museum =

Gem-and-mineral museum in Sinnar, Maharashtra, India

Coordinates: 19.871822°N 73.972304°E

- गारगोटी संग्रहालय
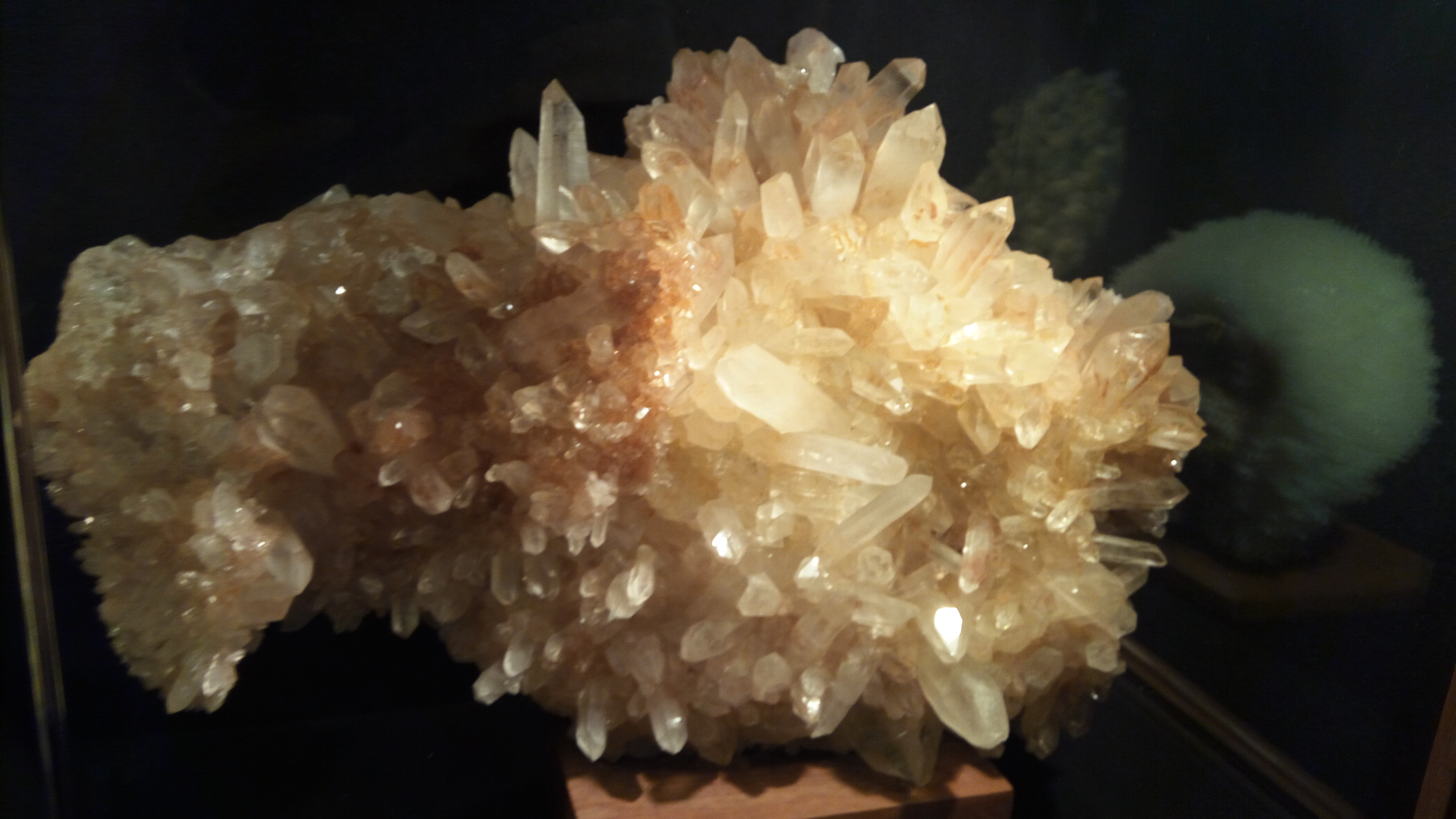
- Location: Sinnar, Nashik, Maharashtra, India
- Collection size: More than 1000 objects
- Visitors: > 200,000 annual
- Website: www.gargoti.com

The Gargoti Museum is a museum in the town Sinnar near Nashik in Indian state of Maharashtra that houses a collection of natural mineral and gem specimens collected by K. C. Pandey over 40 years. The word "goti" refers to a Marathi word meaning stone or pebble. This is India's first and only gem, mineral, and fossil museum. It also houses the largest and finest collection of Indian zeolite minerals and crystals in the world.

== Details ==
The Gargoti Museum houses the largest & the finest collection of Indian zeolite minerals and crystals in the world. It is divided into two galleries namely Deccan Plateau Gallery and Prestige Gallery. There are 2 floors in the museum and has vast collection of minerals and crystals. It is located 32 km from Nashik on Nashik-Shirdi highway in a town named Sinnar.

The museum's displays include:

- Natural Crystals
- Zeolites
- Minerals
- Gem Stones
- Precious Stones & Metals
- Semi-Precious Stones & Metals
- Fossils
- Statues
- Handicrafts

=== Deccan Plateau Gallery ===
This section displays zeolite minerals and crystals excavated from the Deccan region of India, mainly Maharashtra and surroundings states.

Exhibits include:

1. Zeolite, mineral, and crystal specimens
2. Fossils of shells, extinct dinosaurs, and mammoths
3. Finest quality of statues carved out of precious/semi-precious stones
4. The fluorescent mineral display

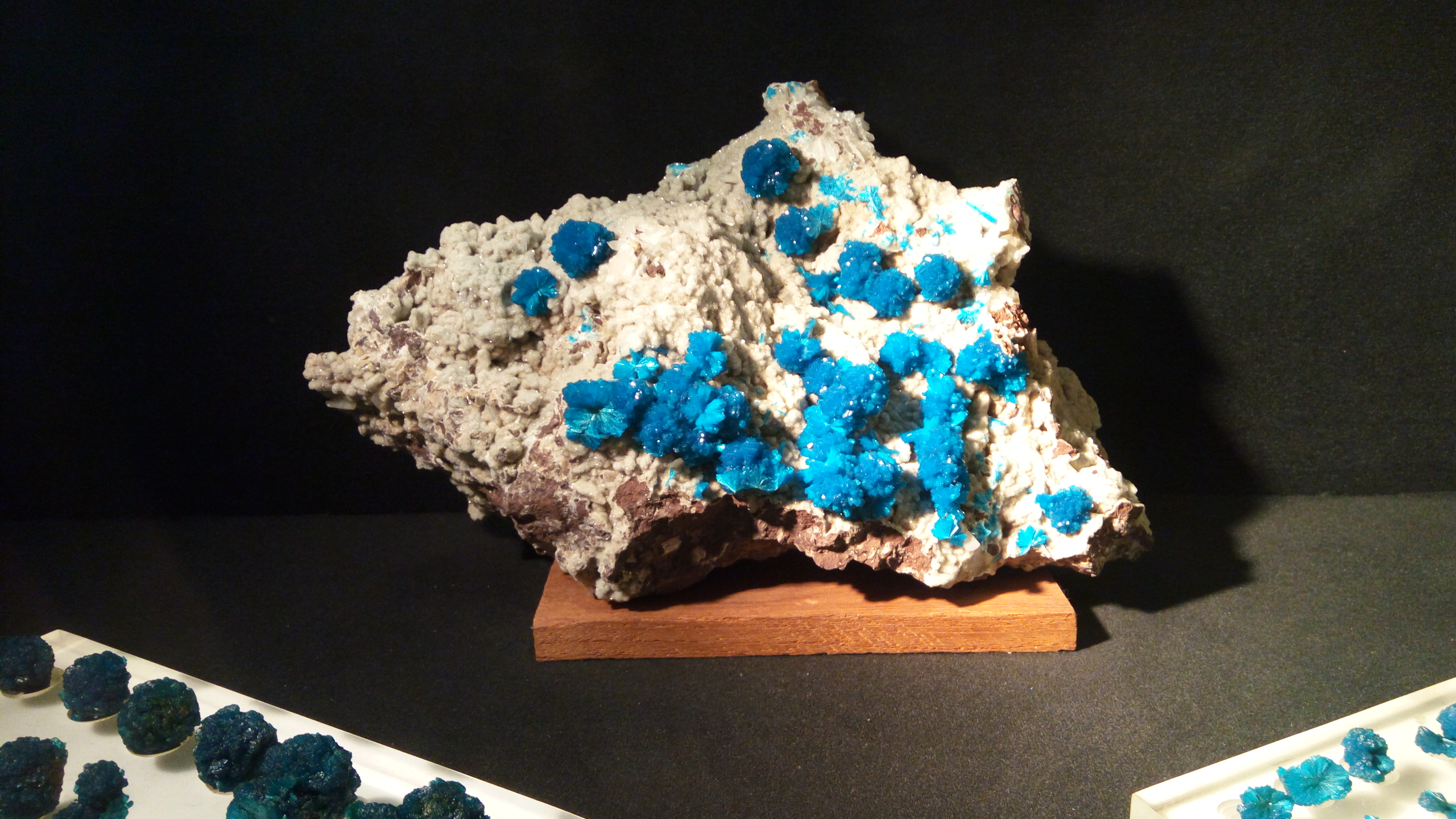
Gargoti Museum Precious stone Pune

=== Prestige Gallery ===
This section displays rare and beautiful finds from India and around the world.

This includes -

1. Gem, precious/semi-precious stones
2. Precious/semi-precious metals
3. Rocks from Moon and Mars
4. The best of Indian zeolite minerals

The Prestige Gallery, designs are inspired by the Indian Parliament's Monument and showcases a glimpse of the spell bounding treasures of Nature.

== Gallery ==
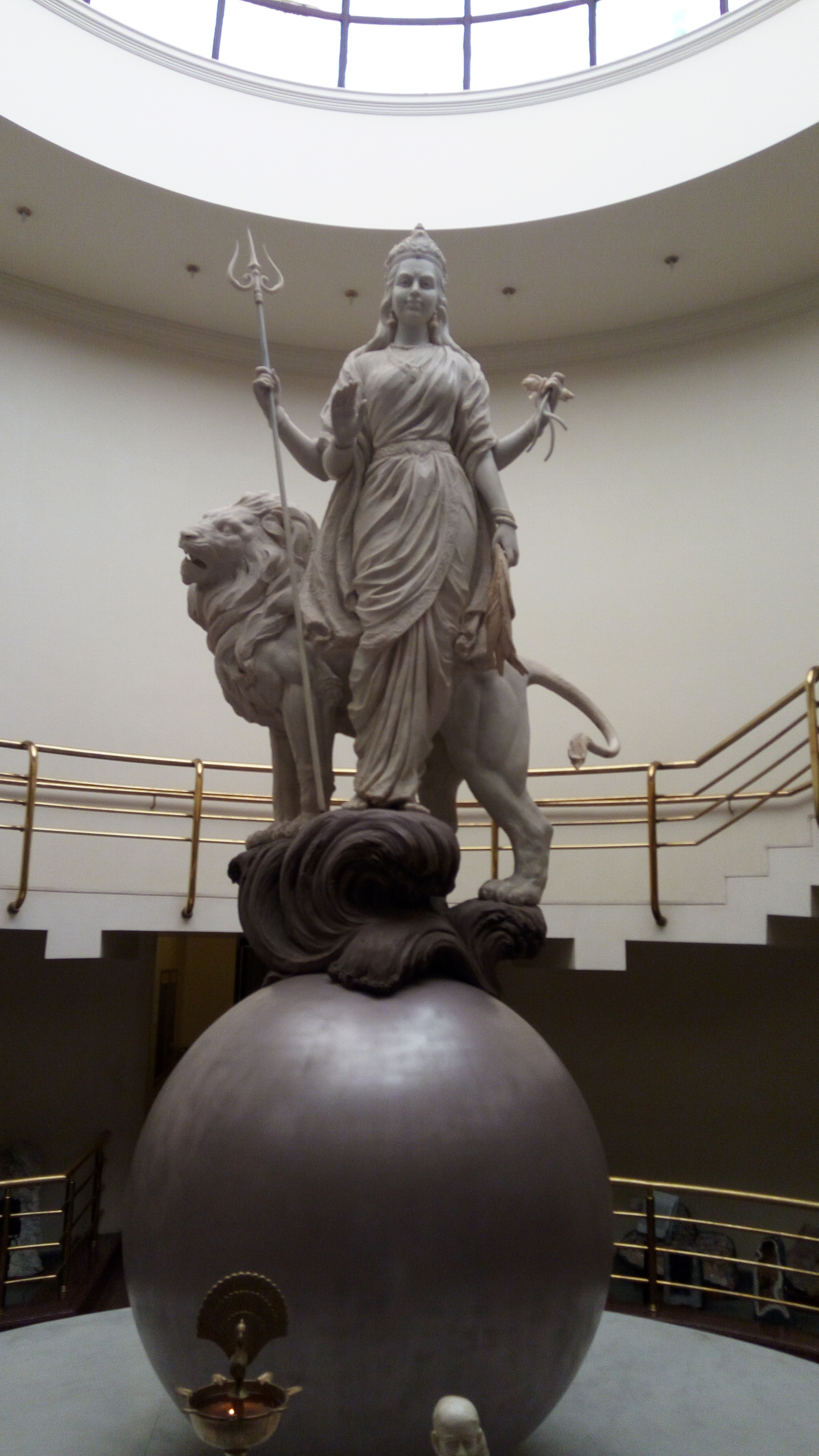

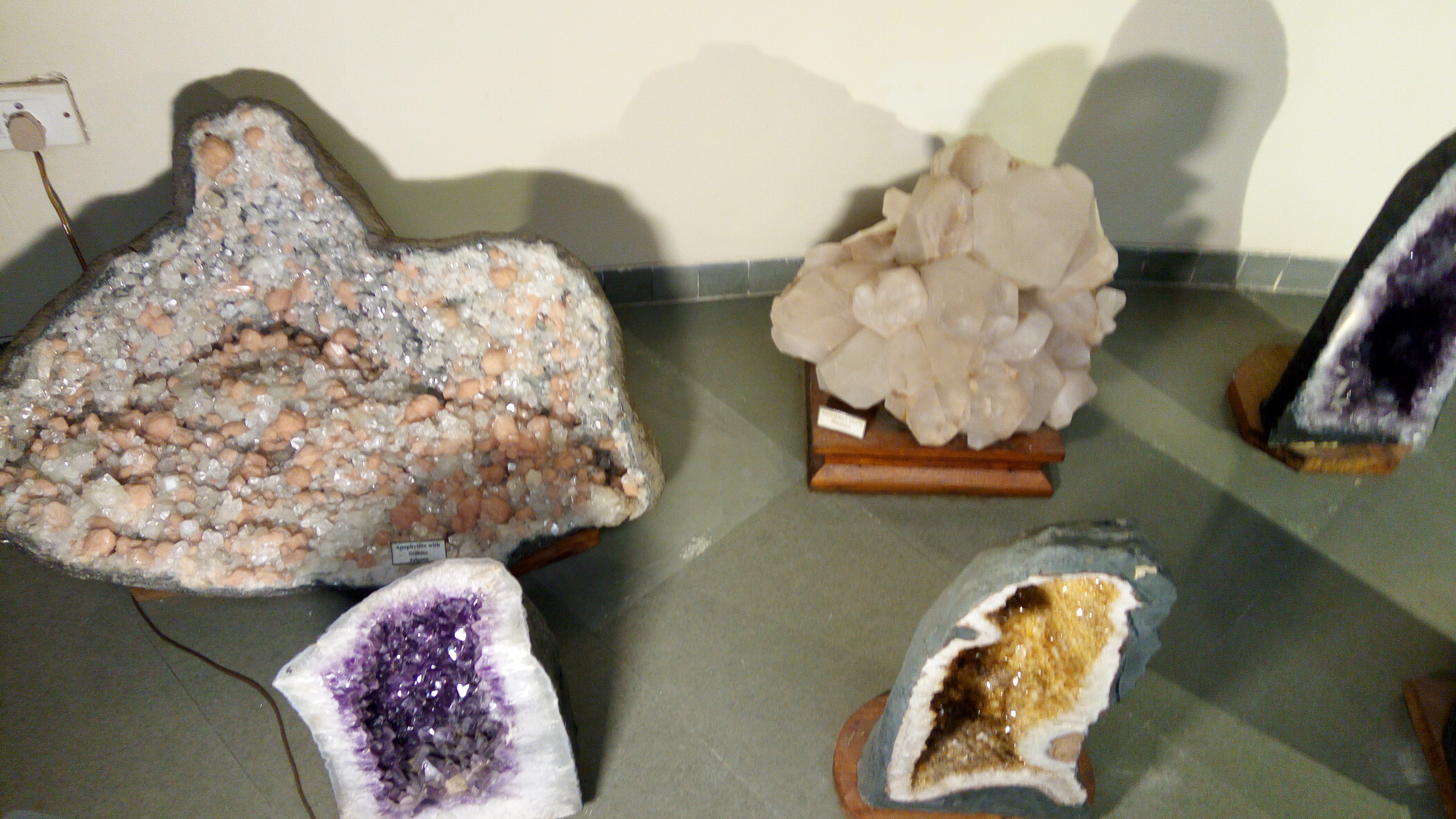

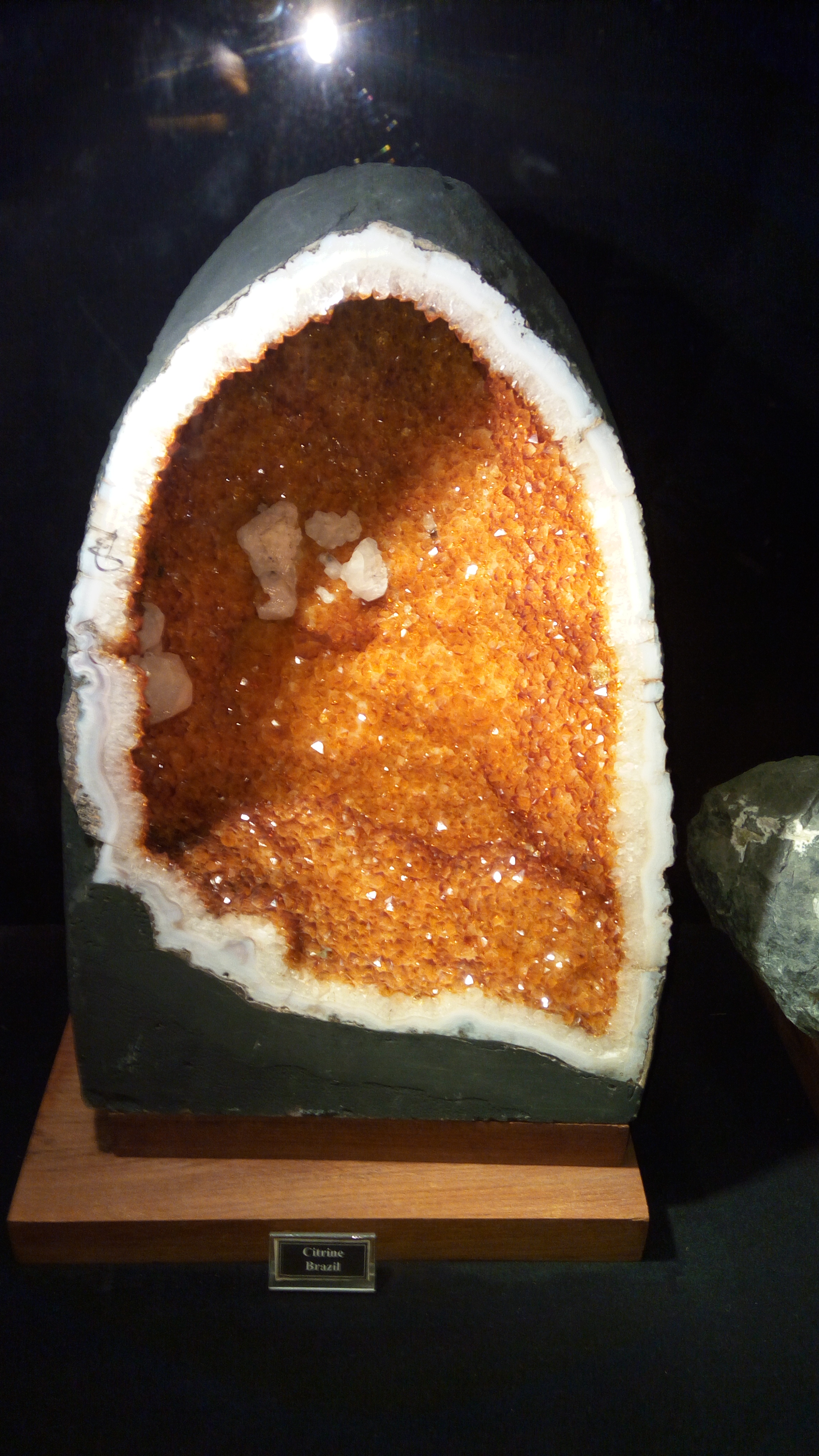

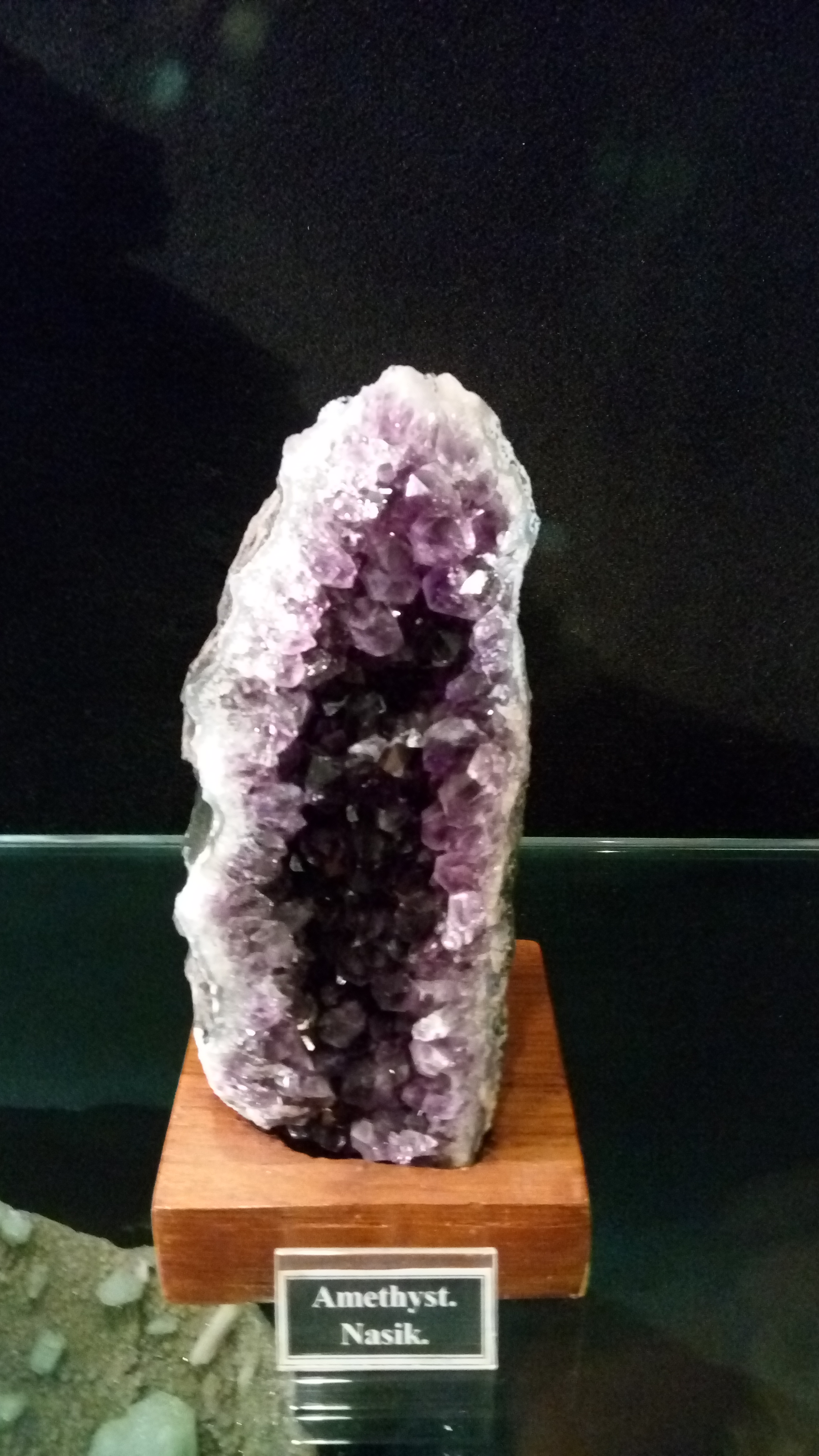

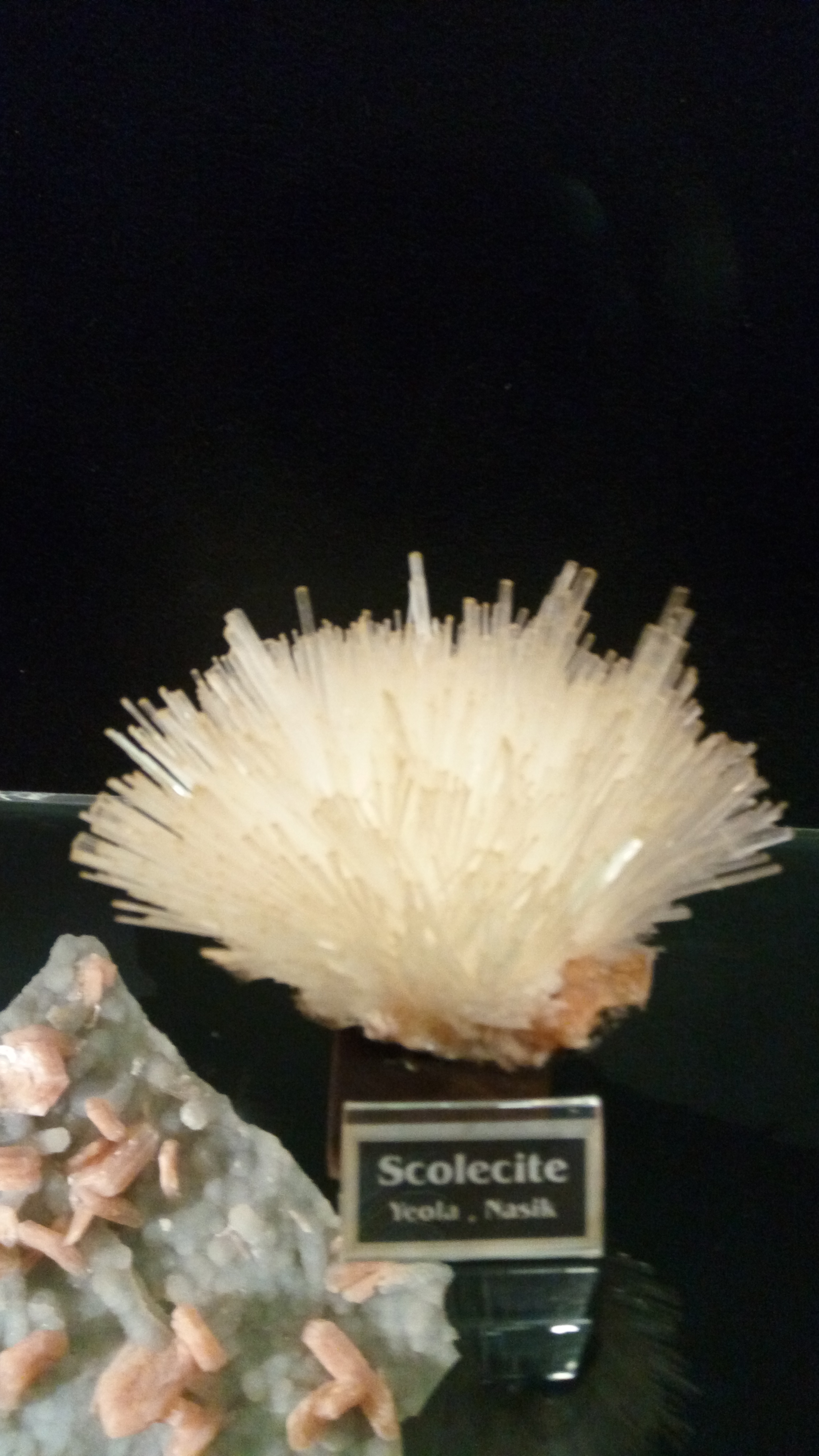

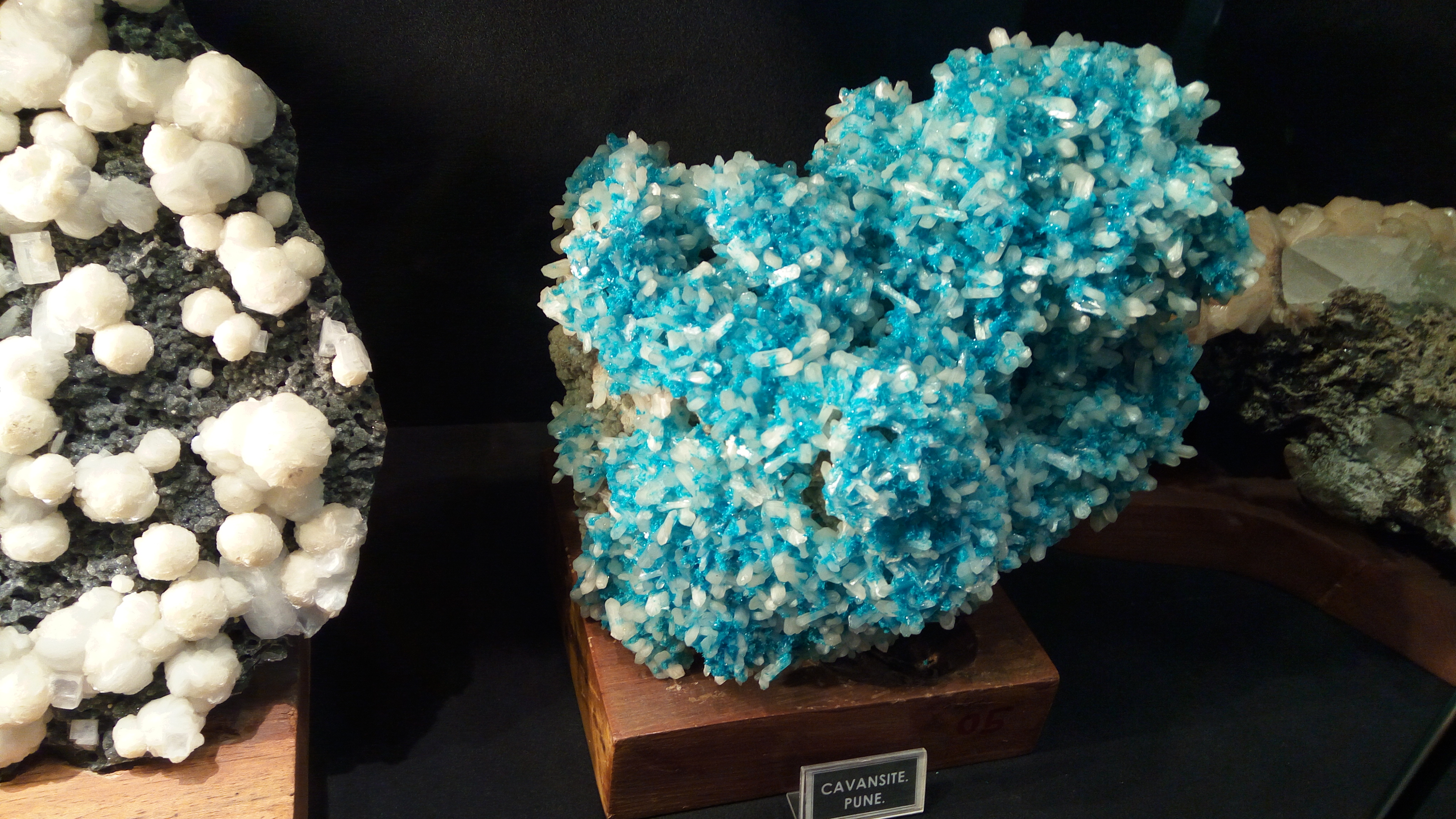

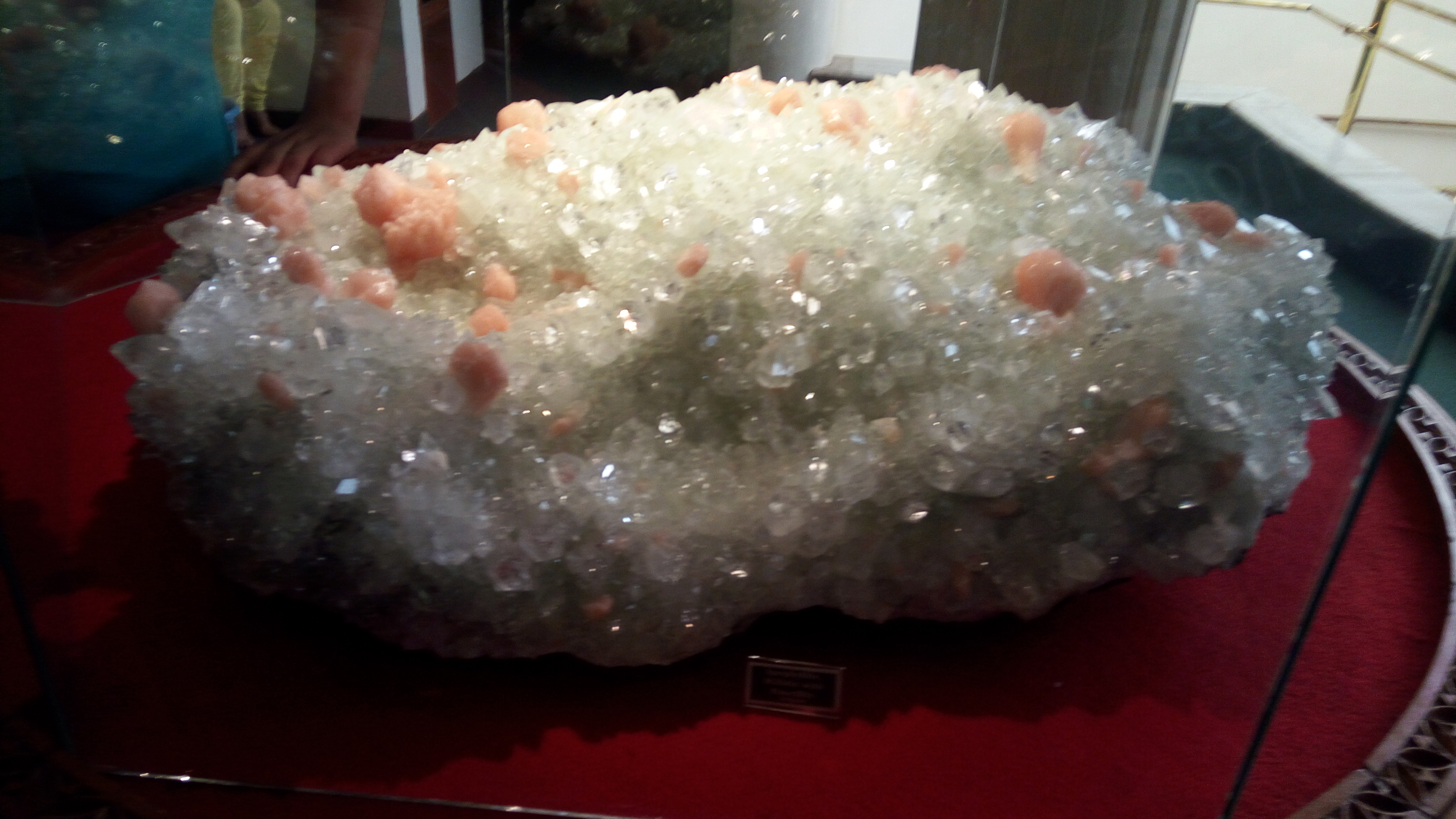

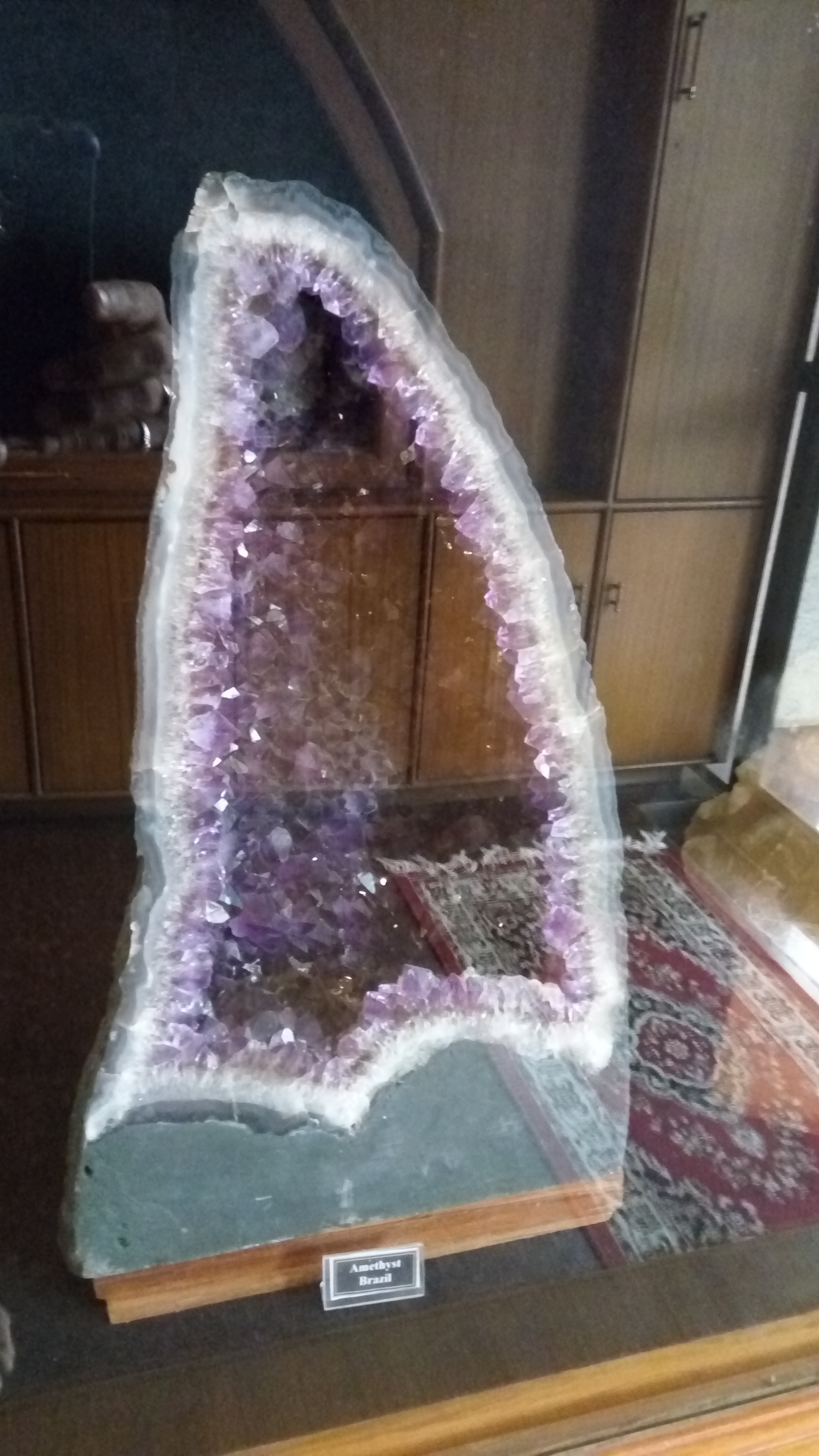
