= Himshikha =

- Township
- Location in Haryana, India Himshikha (India)
- Coordinates: 30.778520°N 76.923046°E
- Country: India
- State: Haryana
- District: Panchkula
- Elevation: 400 m (1,300 ft)

Languages
  - Official: Hindi
  - Native: Mahasui (Baghati)
- Time zone: UTC+5:30 (IST)
- PIN: 134 104
- Telephone code: 91-1733
- ISO 3166 code: IN-HR
- Vehicle registration: HR 49
- Website: haryana.gov.in

Himshikha is a planned, small township located near Pinjore in district Panchkula, Haryana, India, on the Pinjore—Mallah Road. The township was built by the Haryana Housing Board between 1985 and 1989. The Government of Haryana acquired the land from the nearby villages of Naggal Sodhiyan, Ishar Nagar, and Islam Nagar to build the township.

It has a picturesque location in the foothills of the Shivaliks. A lake near Himshikha forms part of a dam on the Kaushalya river.

== Schools and colleges ==
- Kendriya Vidyalaya (Central School)
- Brahmrishi College of Education
