= Panchayatana (temple) =

Layout in Hindu temple architecture

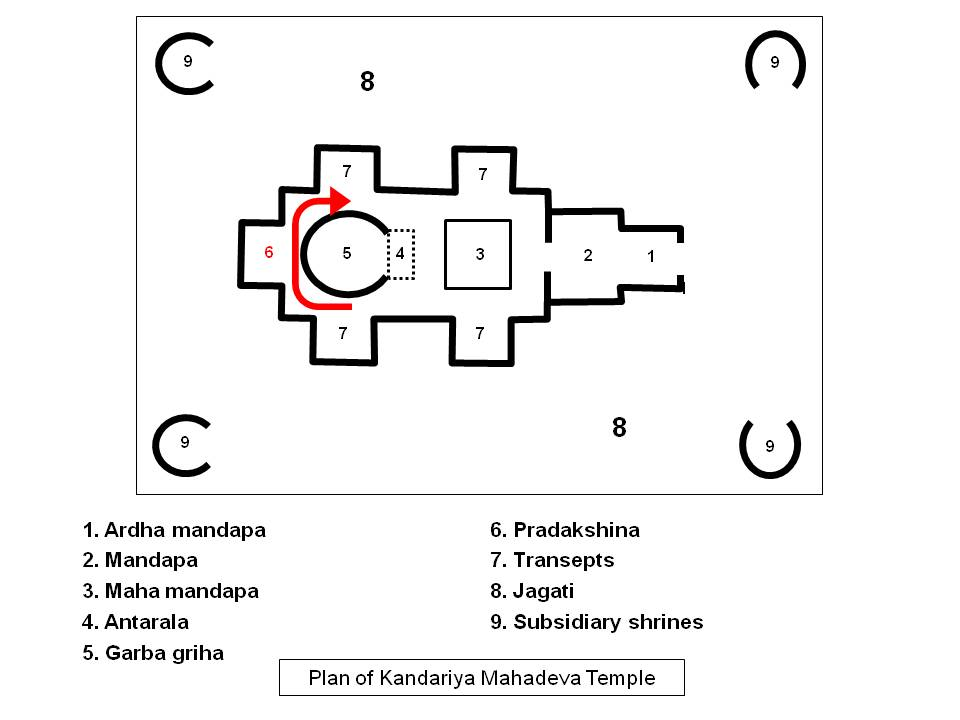
Plan of the Kandariya Mahadeva Temple in Khajuraho.

Panchayatana (Sanskrit: पञ्चायतन, romanized: pañcāyatana) is a Hindu temple layout where the main shrine is surrounded by four subsidiary shrines. The origin of the name are the Sanskrit words pancha (five) and ayatana (containing), referring to a "five-shrined" layout.

Generally, Hindu temples are built along a west-east axis. The four subsidiary shrines are located at the north-east, south-east, south-west, and the north-west.

== Panchayatana temples ==
- Shree Dev Vyadeshwar in Guhagar
- Kandariya Mahadeva Temple in Khajuraho
- Brahmeswara Temple in Bhubaneswar
- Jagdish Temple in Udaipur
- Lakshmana Temple in Khajuraho
- Lingaraja Temple in Bhubaneswar
- Arasavalli Temple near Srikakulam District of Andhra Pradesh near Visakhapatnam. Main shrine dedicated to Aditya. Subsidiary shrines dedicated to Ganesh, Shiva, Parvati and Vishnu.
- Dashavatara Temple in Deogarh, Uttar Pradesh. It should be the oldest panchayatana temple in India.
- Nabaratna Temple in Pantchupi
- Shiva Panchayatana Temple in Tumbadi, Tumkur district. Subsidiary shrines dedicated to Lakshmi Narasimha, Vinayaka, Parvati and Surya.
- Gondeshvara temple, in Sinnar, Maharashtra
- Panchayatan temple at Dronasagar, Kashipur, Uttarakhand is an archeological site, from 6th century AD.
- Rinmukteshwar Panchdevalaya, Ena situated in Ena Village of Surat district in Gujarat State.
