= Sinnar =

- Town
- Sinnar
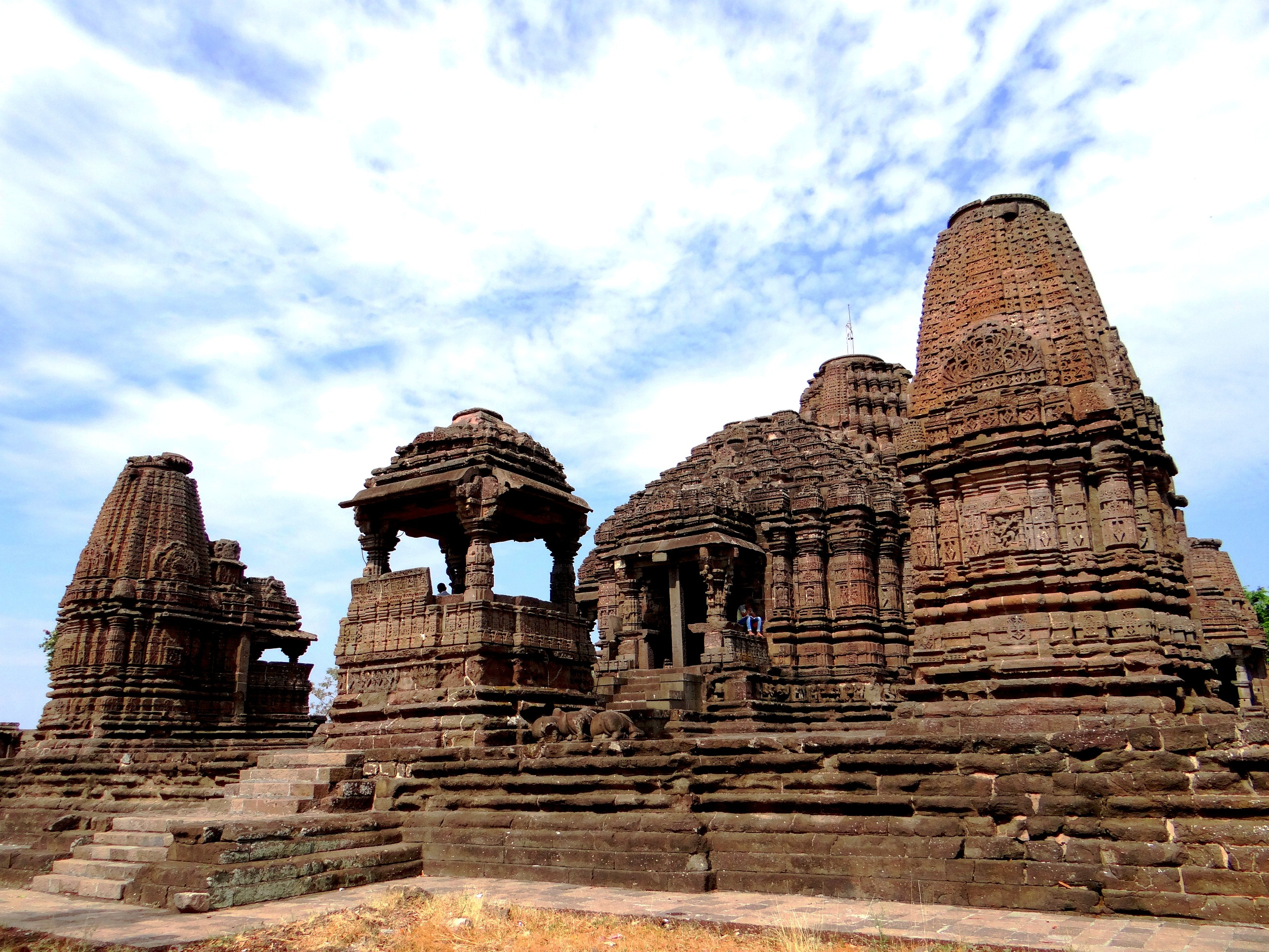
- Gondeshwar Temple

- Location in Maharashtra, India
- Coordinates: 19.85°N 74.0°E
- Country: India
- State: Maharashtra
- District: Nashik

Government
  - Type: Municipal Council
  - Body: Sinnar Municipal Council

Area
  - Total: 195 km^{2} (75 sq mi)
- Elevation: 651 m (2,136 ft)

Population (2011)
  - Total: 65,299
  - Density: 335/km^{2} (867/sq mi)

Languages
  - Official: Marathi
- Time zone: UTC+5:30 (IST)
- Telephone code: 02551
- Vehicle registration: MH 15

Sinnar (Pronunciation: [sinːəɾ]) is a city and a municipal council in Sinnar taluka of Nashik district in the Indian state of Maharashtra. Sinnar is the third largest city in Nashik district after Nashik and Malegaon.

== History ==
According to local tradition, Sinnar was founded by the Gavli chieftain Rav Singuni, and his son Rav Govinda built the temple of Gondeshwara at a cost of 2 lakh rupees.

Modern historians identify Sinnar with Seuna-pura, a town established by the Seuna (Yadava) king Seuna-chandra. At its peak, the Yadava dynasty (850 - 1334) ruled a kingdom stretching from the Tungabhadra to the Narmada Rivers, including present-day Maharashtra, north Karnataka and parts of Madhya Pradesh. Their later capital was at Devagiri, now known as Daulatabad in Maharashtra.

== Geography ==
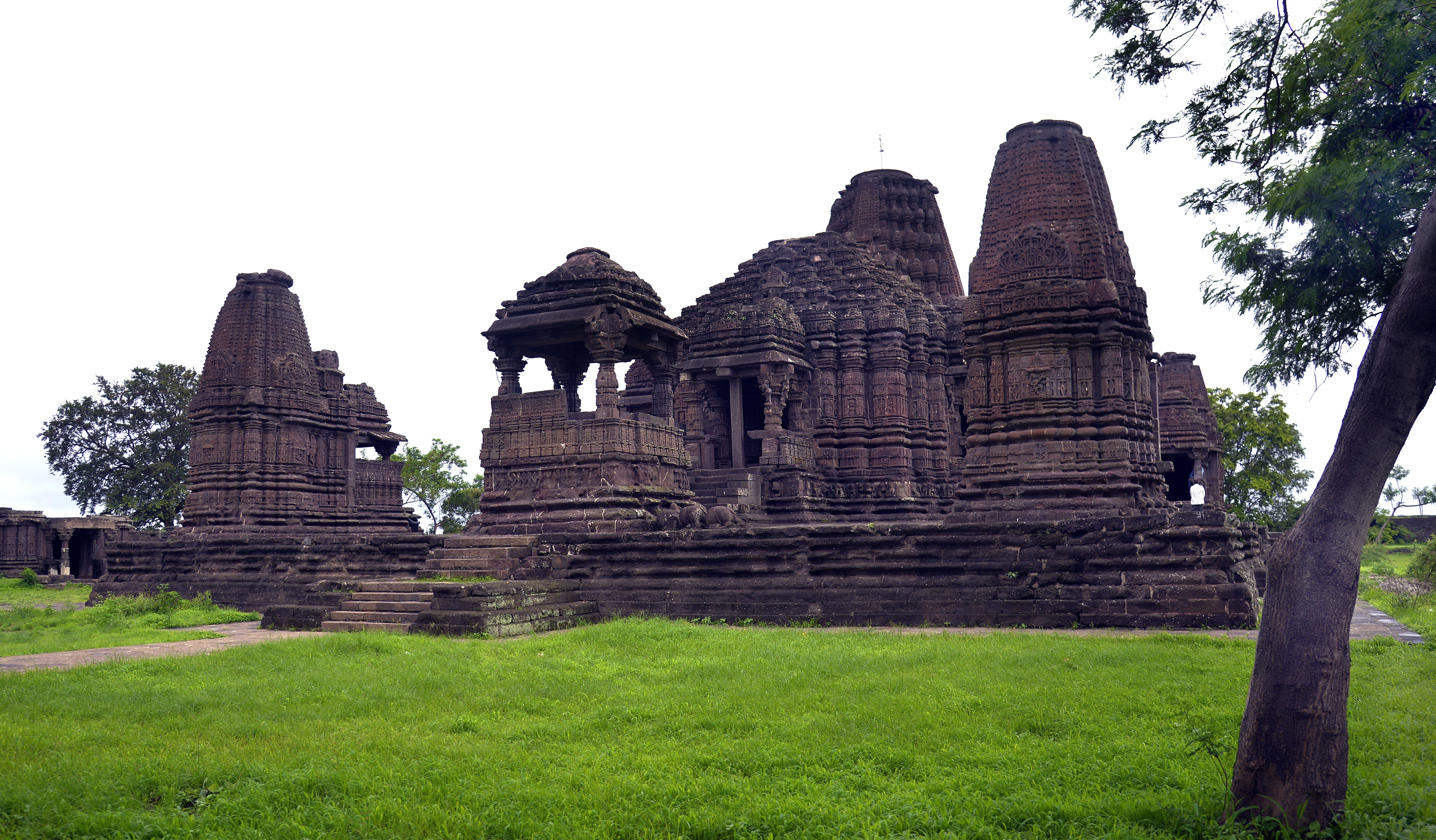
Gondeshwar temple

Sinnar is located at 19.85°N 74.0°E. It has an average elevation of 651.4 metres (2135 feet). Sinnar is one of the major industrial zones of Malegaon (MIDC) built around the city of Nashik which have multiple international production companies. It lies 30 km southeast of Nashik city on the Pune–Nashik Highway.

== Demographics ==
As of 2001 India census, Sinnar had a population of 65,299. Males constitute 52% of the population and females 48%. Sinnar has an average literacy rate of 71%, higher than the national average of 59.5%: male literacy is 77%, and female literacy is 64%. In Sinnar, 15% of the population is under 6 years of age.

== Culture ==
The Gondeshwar Temple, an 11th-12th century temple dedicated to Shiva, is located in Sinnar.

The Gargoti Museum houses a collection of mineral specimens native to the region.
