= Sinnar taluka =

- taluka
- Location in Maharashtra, India
- Coordinates: 19°51′00″N 74°00′00″E
- Country: India
- State: Maharashtra
- District: Nashik District

Area
  - Total: 1,352.61 km^{2} (522.25 sq mi)

Population (2004)
  - Total: 292,000
  - Density: 216/km^{2} (559/sq mi)

Languages
  - Official: Marathi
- Time zone: UTC+5:30 (IST)
- Nearest city: Sinnar

Sinnar is a takula (tehsil) in Niphad subdivision of Nashik District in Maharashtra, India.
