= Architecture of Delhi =

Delhi's (in the National Capital Region) architectural heritage and legacy dates back more than a thousand years. As the capital of several empires of India, including the Rajput kingdom, Delhi Sultanate, Mughal Empire, and British Raj, the city of Delhi has been a centre for art and architecture.

== Rajput Kingdom ==
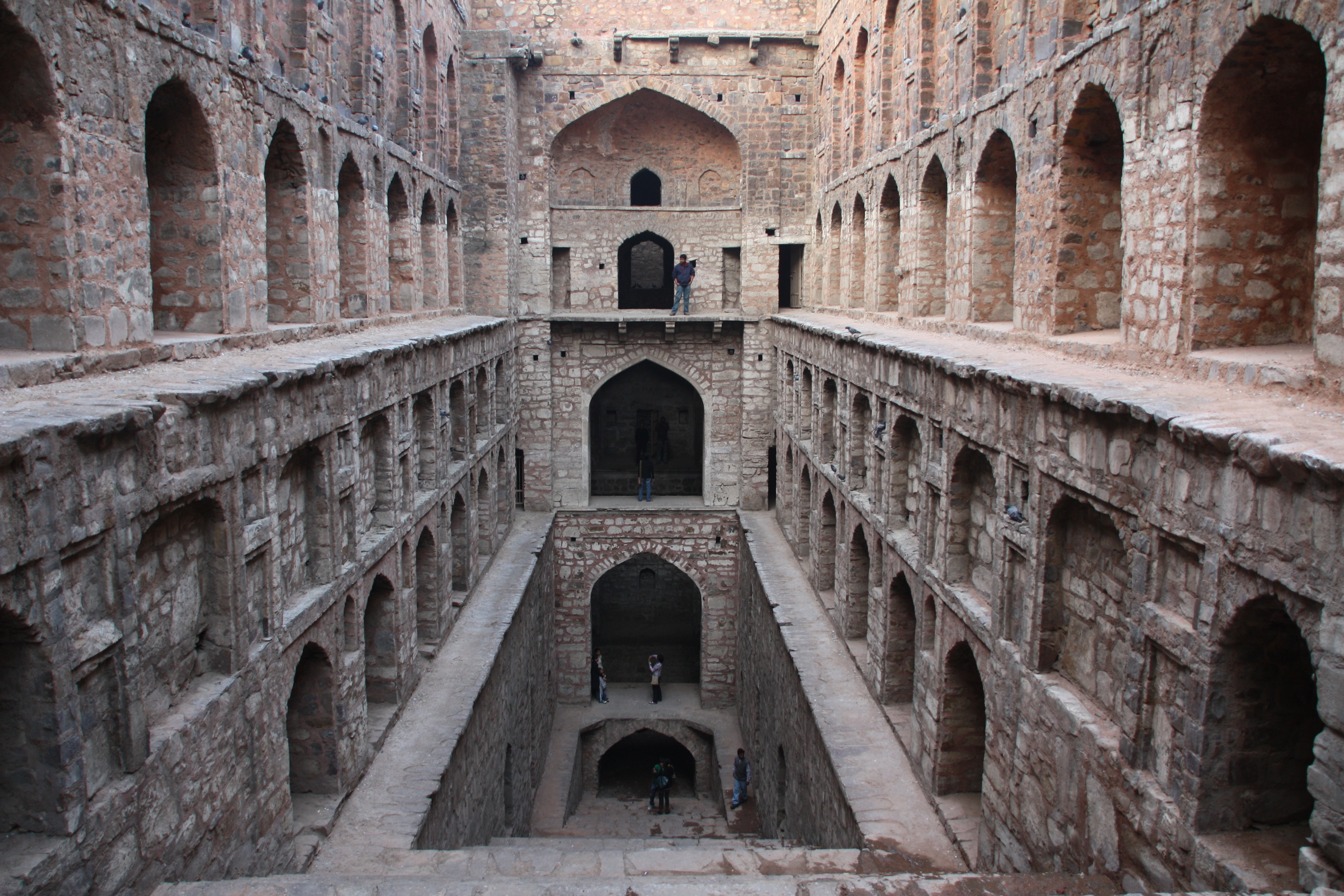
Agrasen ki Baoli

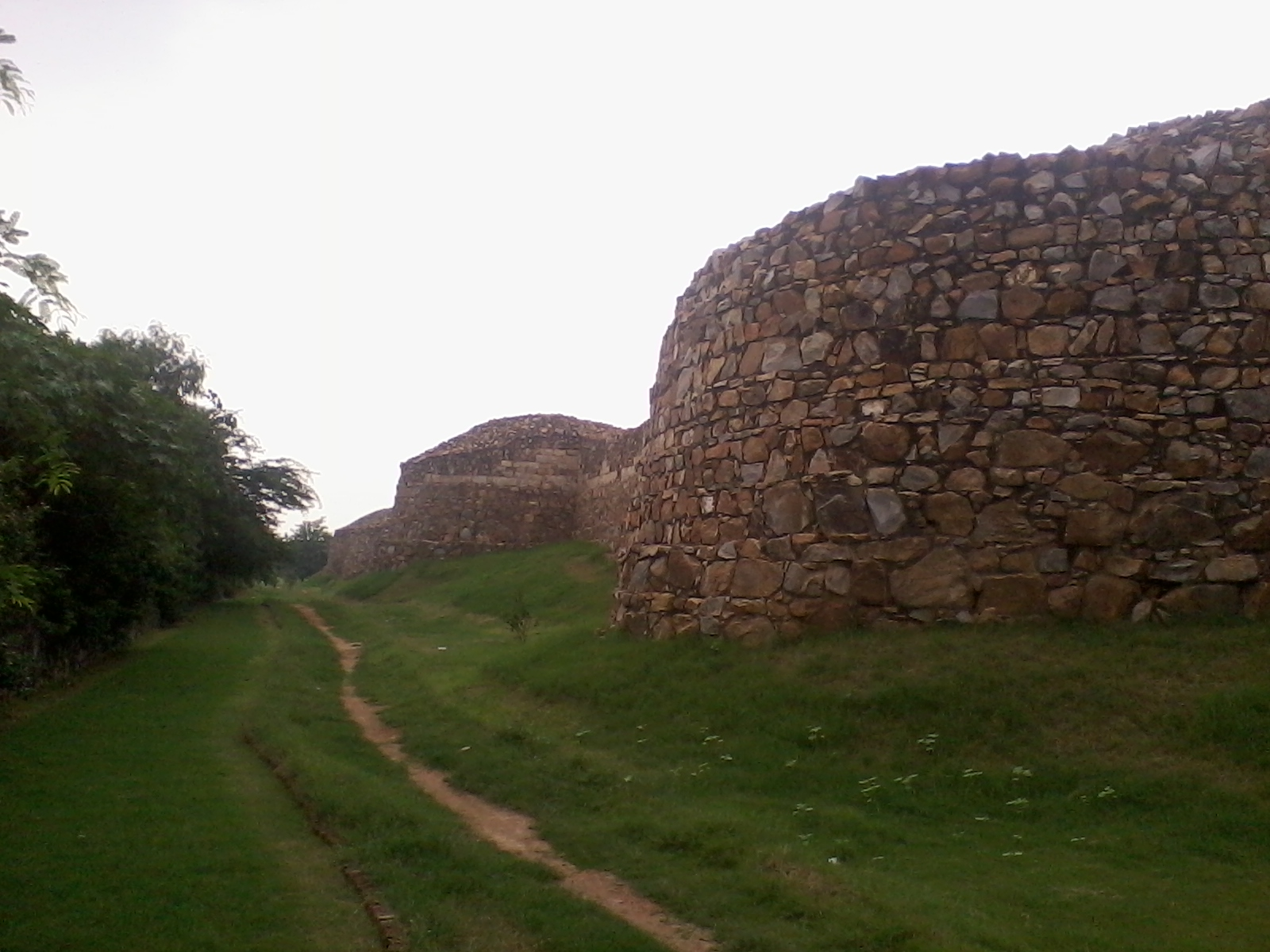
Qila Rai Pithora

The few surviving structures from before the Delhi Sultanate period include Agrasen ki Baoli, Surajkund reservoir, Lal Kot and Qila Rai Pithora in the National Capital Region. There were several temples built during this period, remnants of which are still present in Qutb complex. These were built by the Tomaras and Chahamans (Chauhans) Rajput dynasties.

== Delhi Sultanate ==
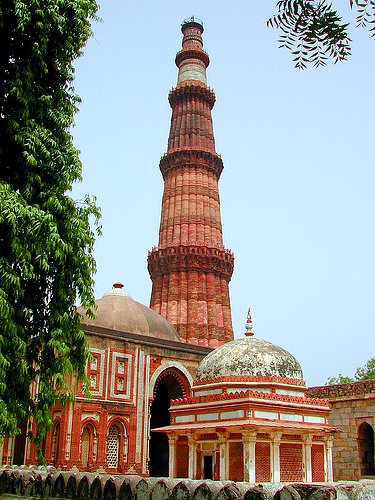
The Qutub Minar is the world's tallest brick minaret at 72.5 metres, built by Qutb-ud-din Aibak of the Slave dynasty in 1192 CE.

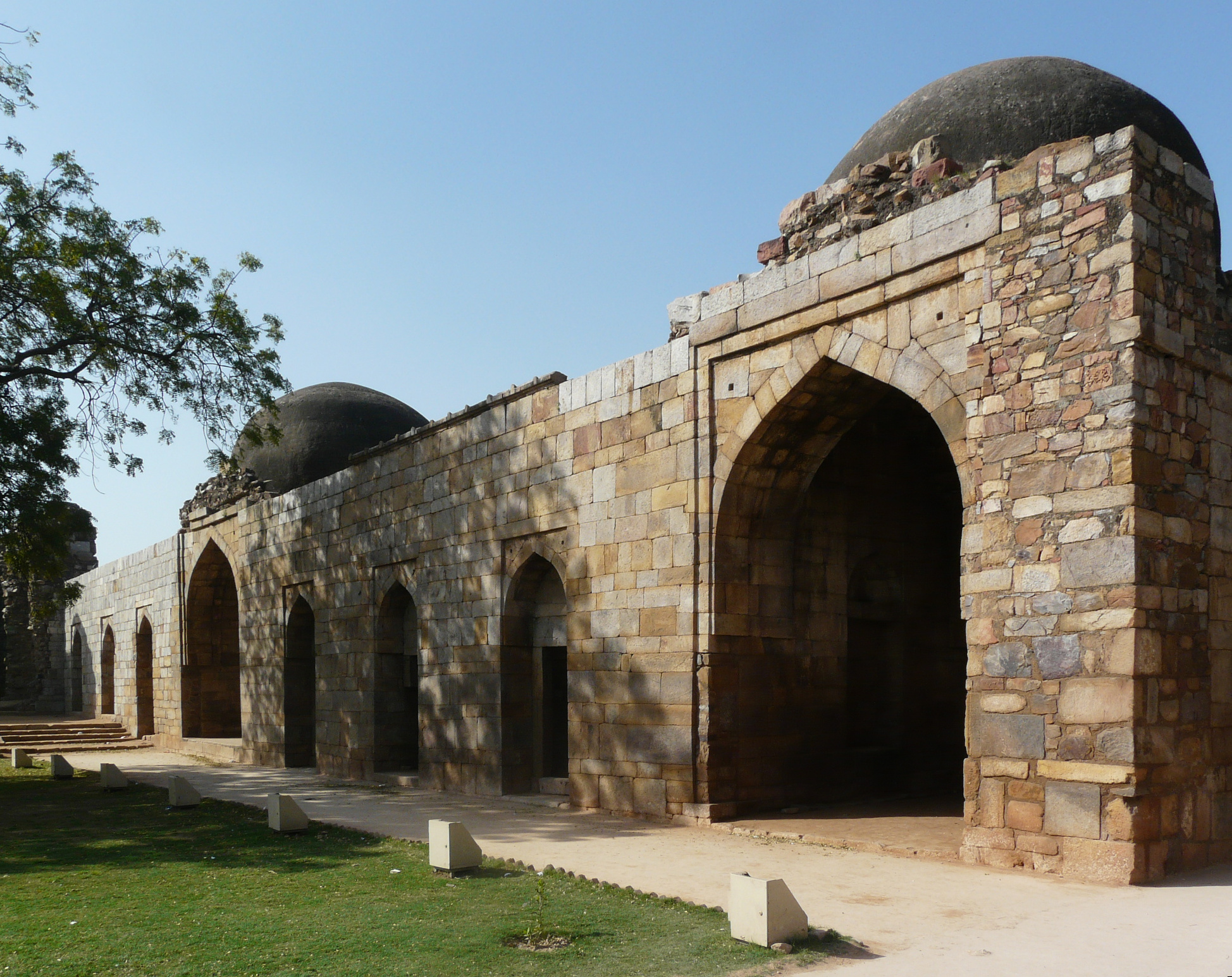
Alauddin Khilji's madrasa and Tomb in the Qutb complex.

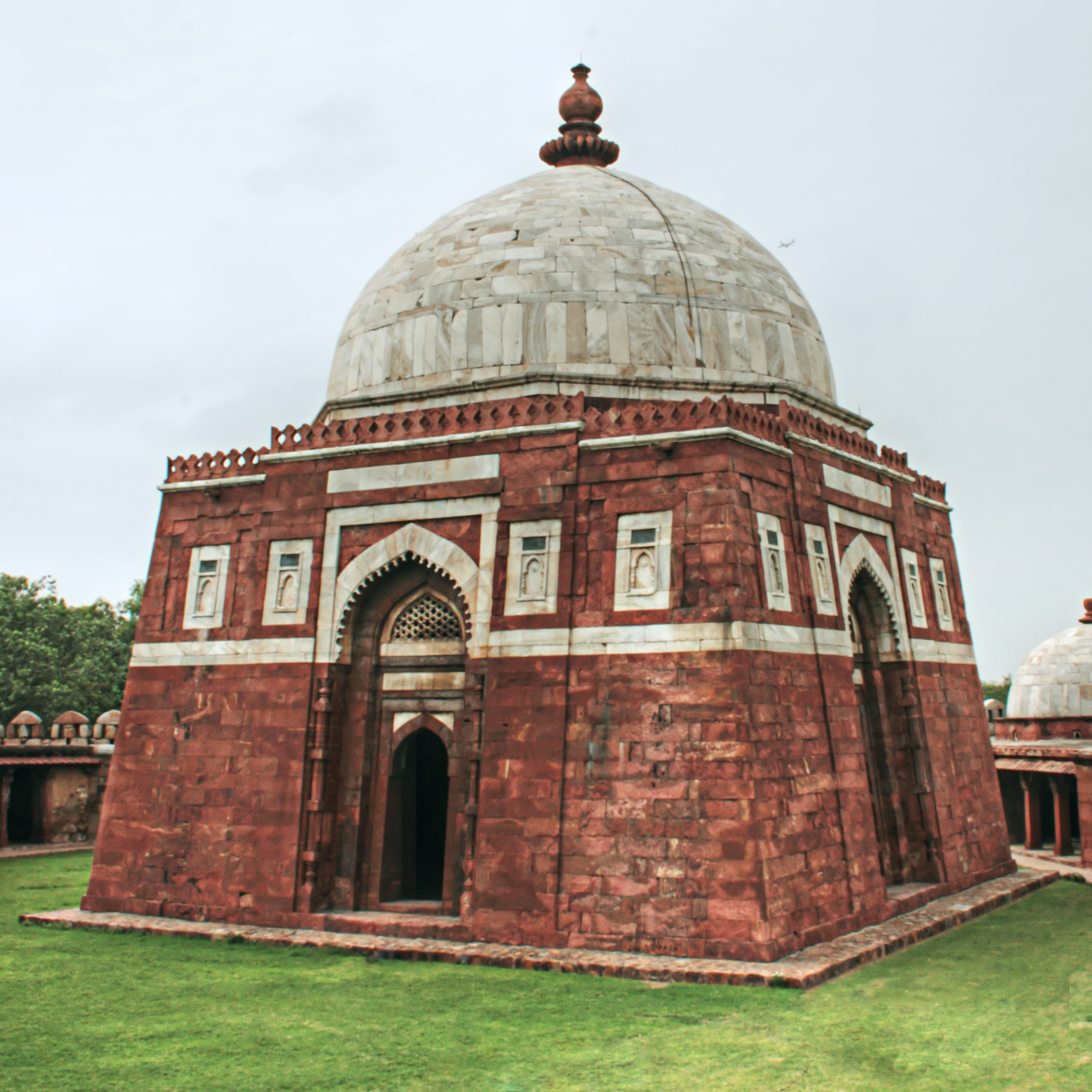
Tomb of Ghiyasuddin Tughluq within the Tughlaqabad Fort.

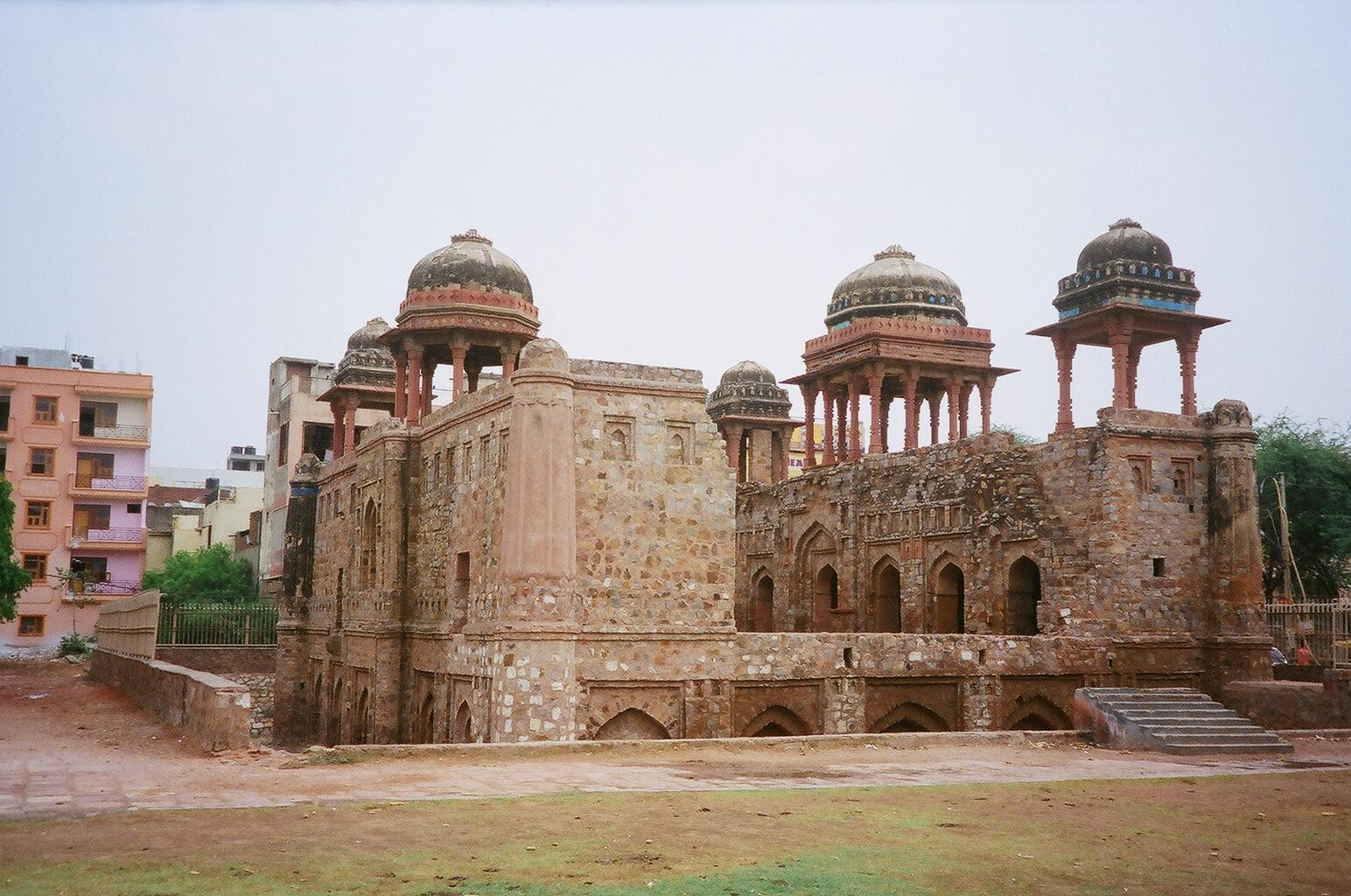
Jahaz Mahal is built during the Lodi dynasty period (1452–1526) as a pleasure resort.

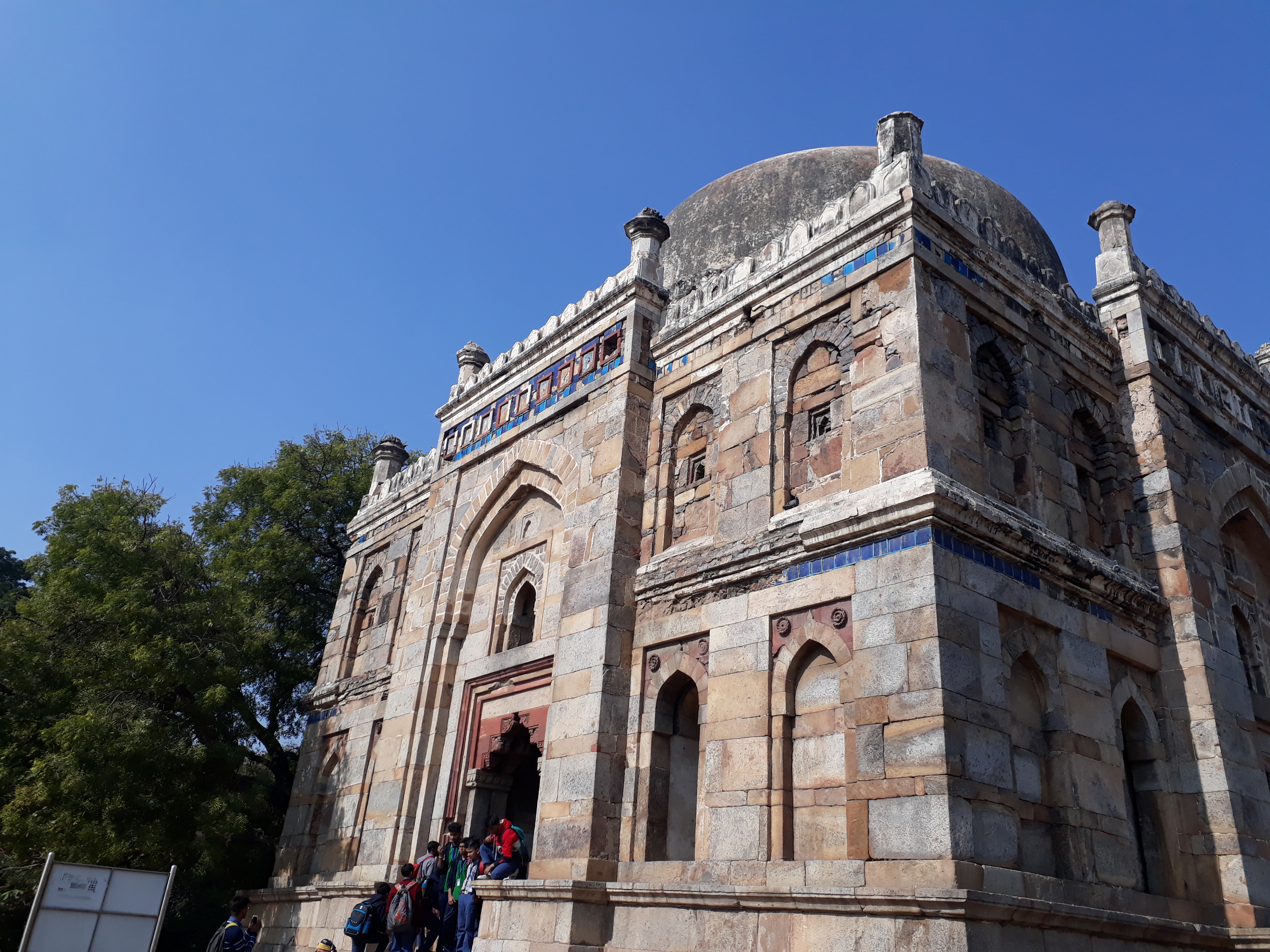
Shish Gumbad in Lodhi garden, New Delhi

The Delhi Sultanate ruled the city between 1206 and 1526. Their rule saw the development of early Indo-Islamic architecture, the most prominent being the Qutb Minar complex, a group of monuments surrounding the Qutb Minar in the National Capital Region. This period also saw building of many forts and cities like Siri Fort, Tughlaqabad and Feroz Shah Kotla. Many tombs were built around this period which are still present in many locations like Qutb Minar complex, Hauz Khas Complex and Lodi Gardens.

== Mughal Empire ==
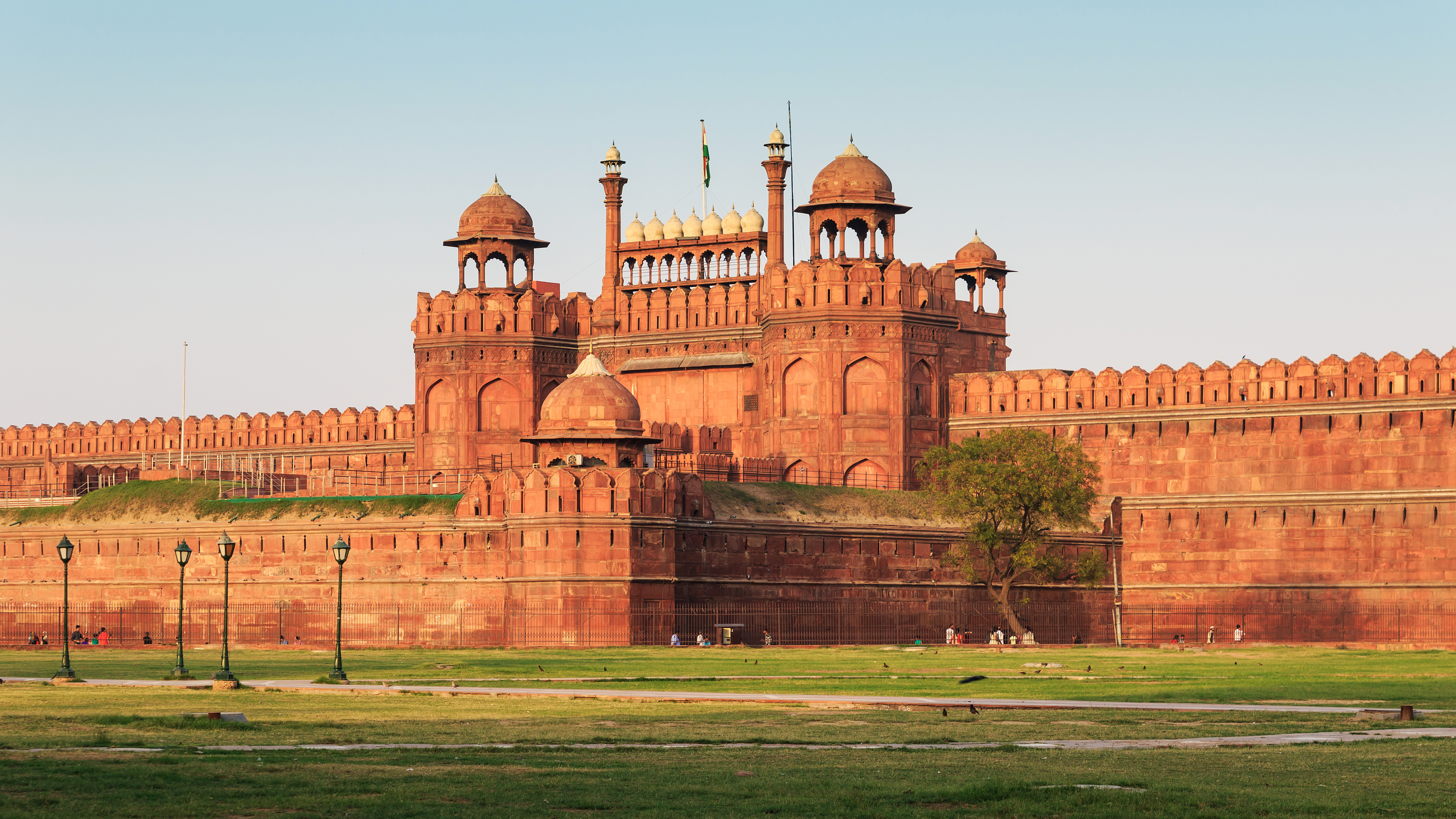
The Red Fort was commissioned by Mughal Emperor Shah Jahan in the 17th century, it was the main residence of the Mughal emperors for nearly 200 years.

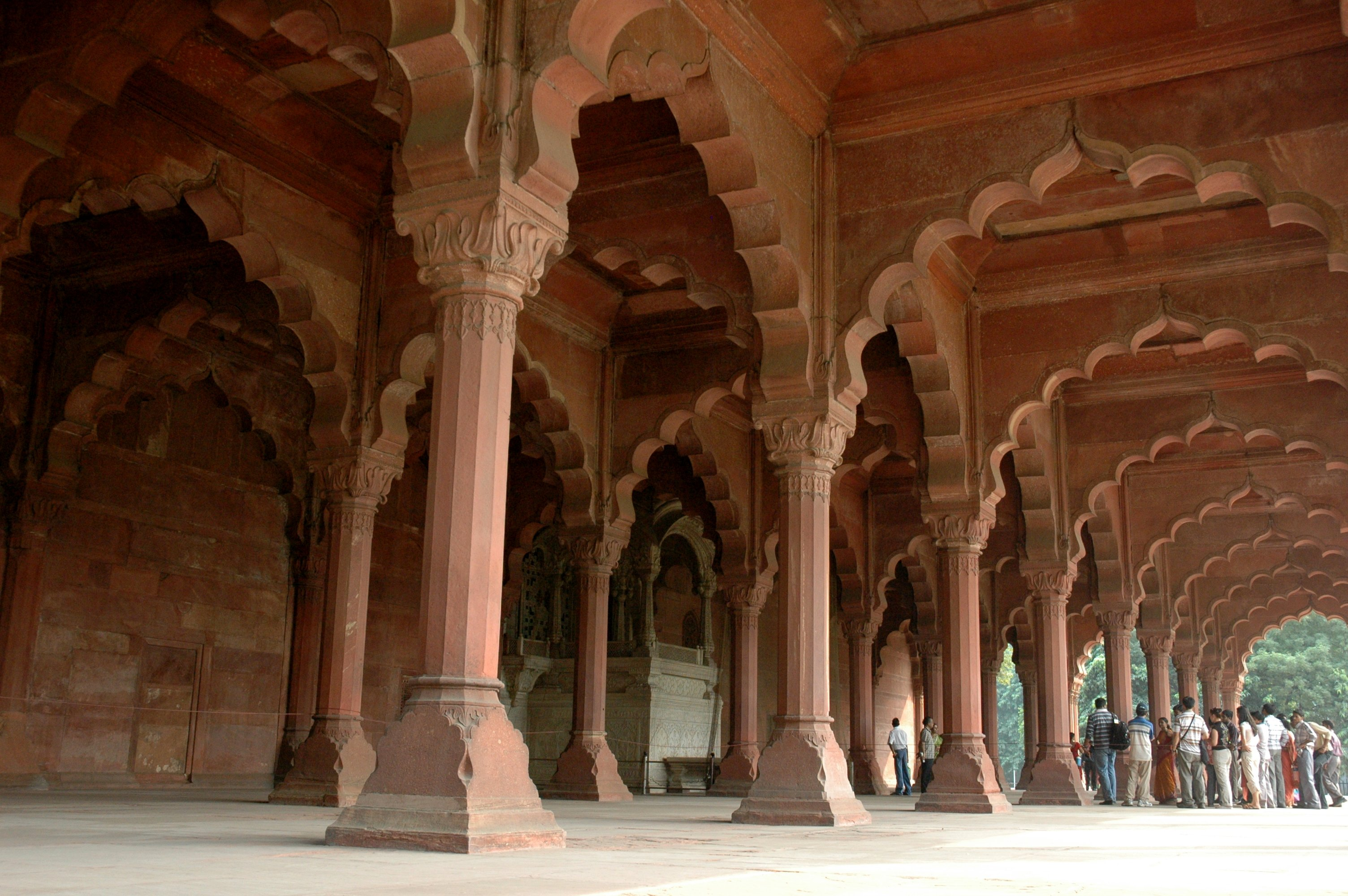
Diwan-i-Am (Red Fort)

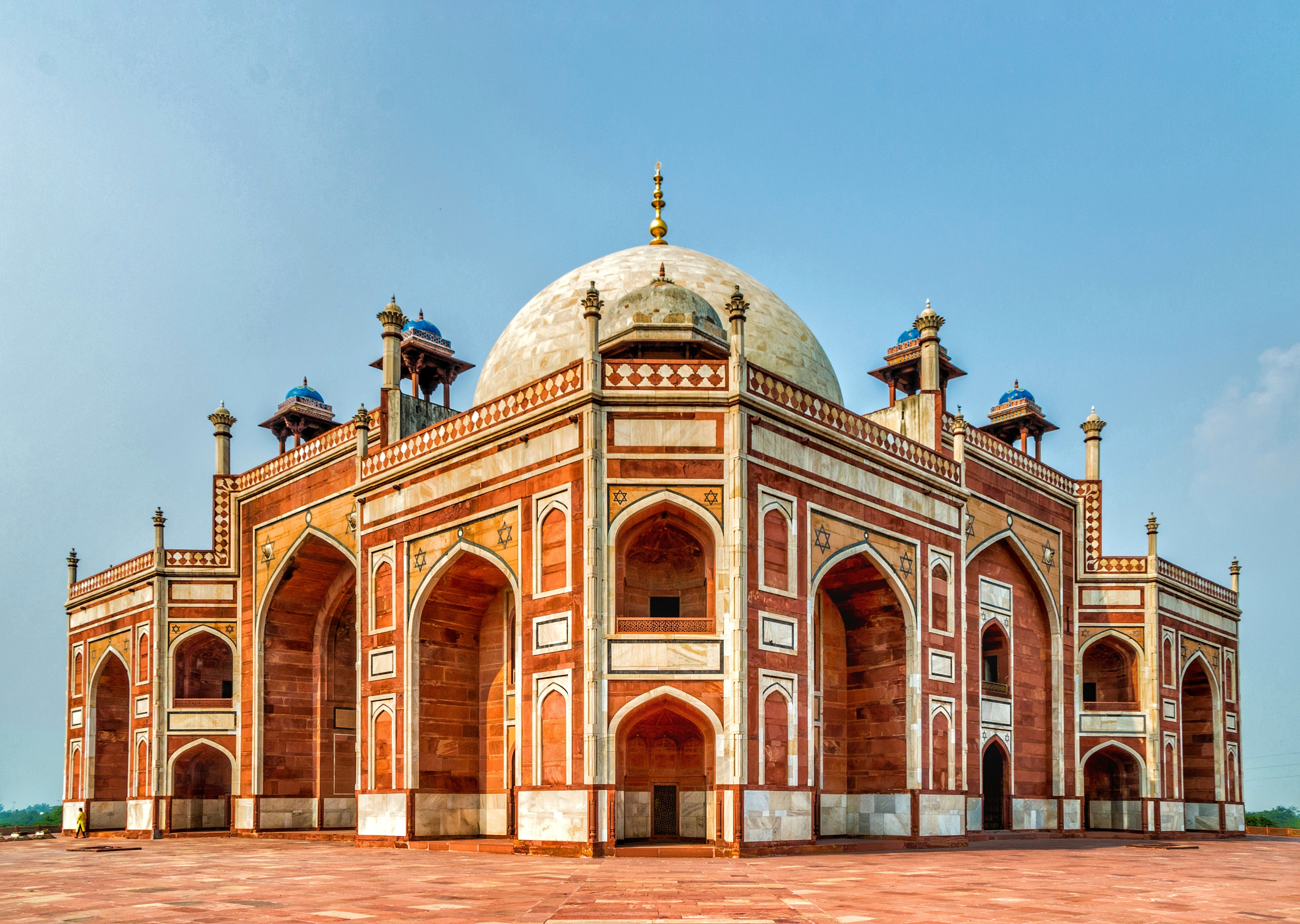
Humayun's Tomb is considered a predecessor to the Taj Mahal.

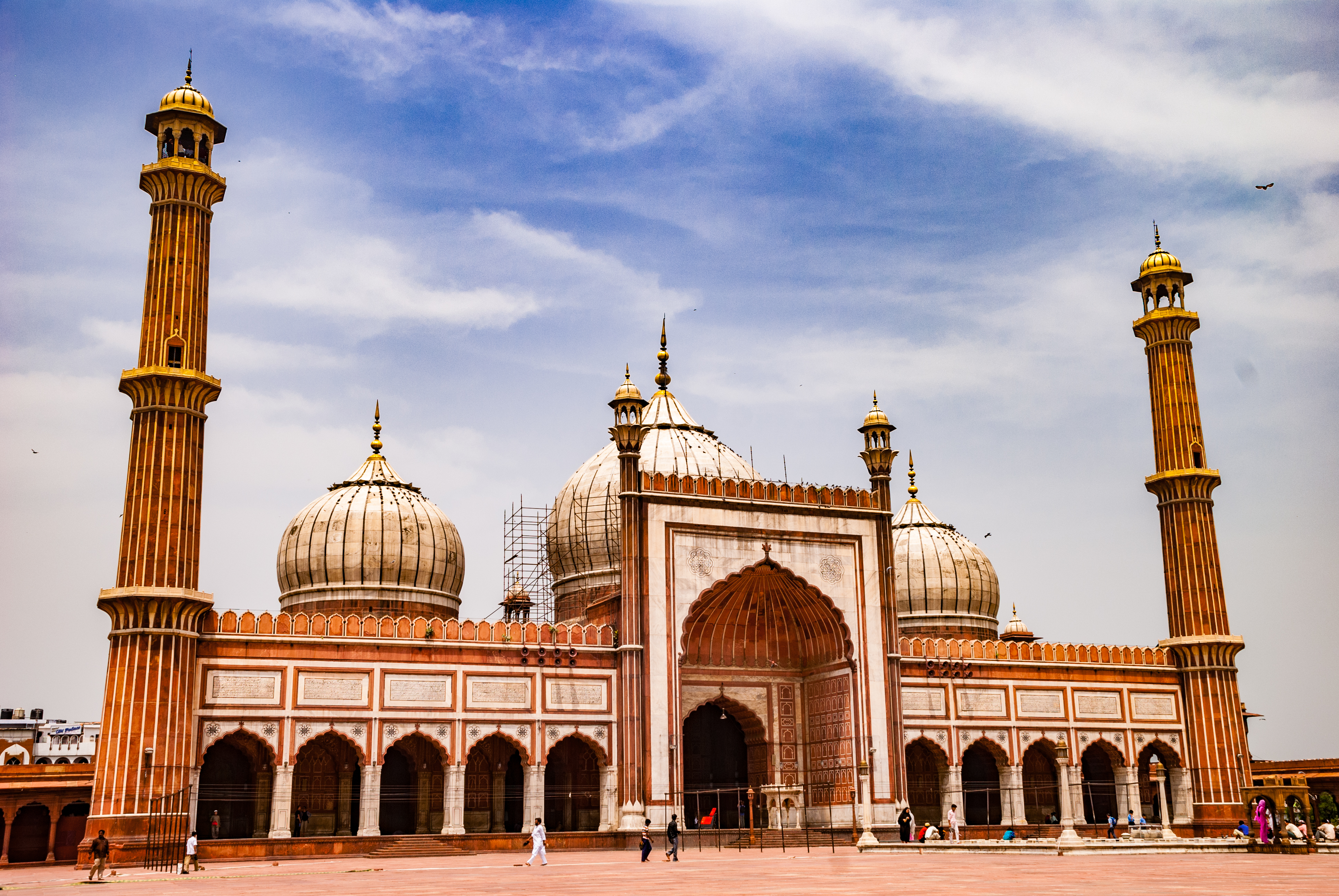
The Jama Masjid, Delhi is one of the largest mosques in India.

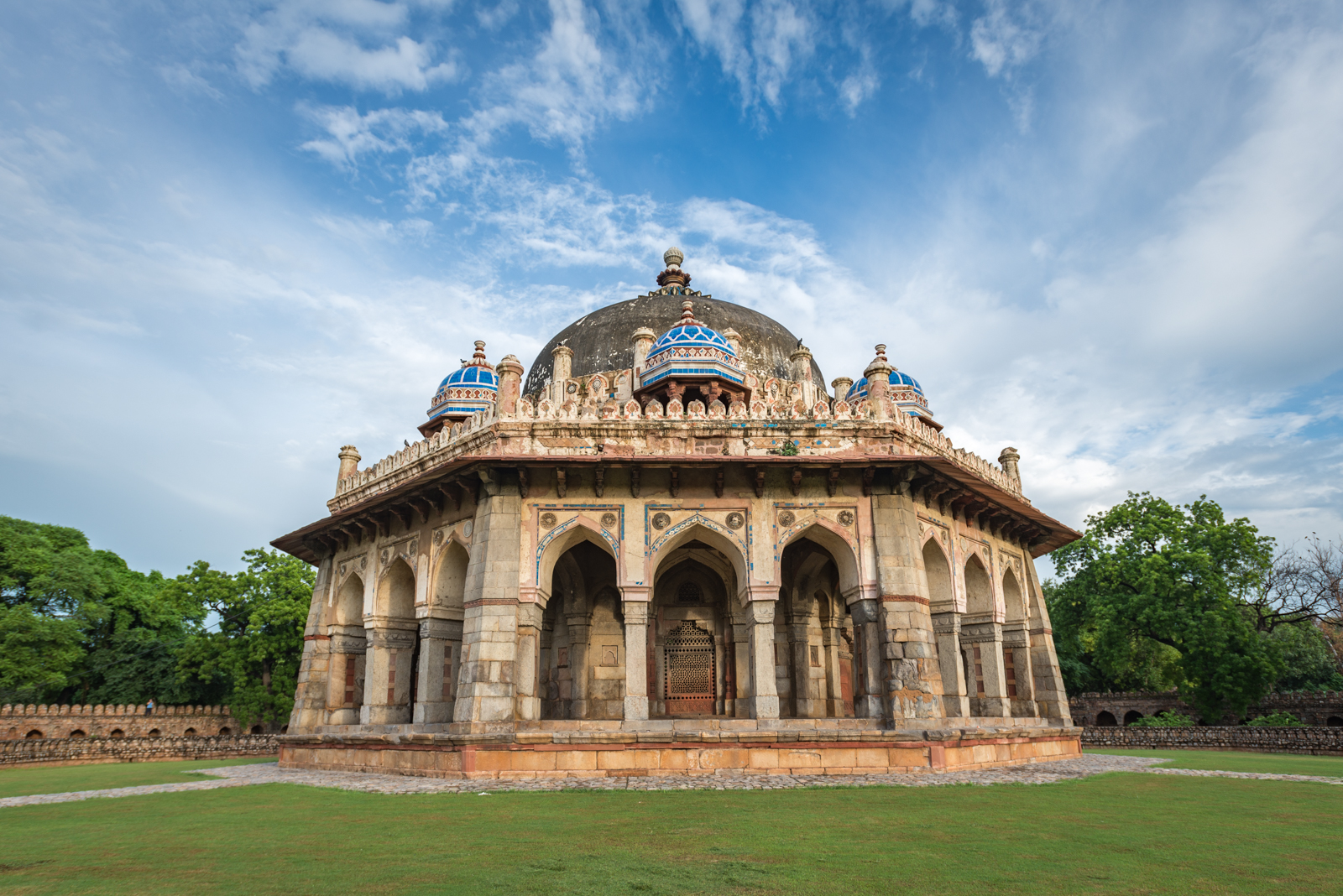
Tomb of Isa Khan

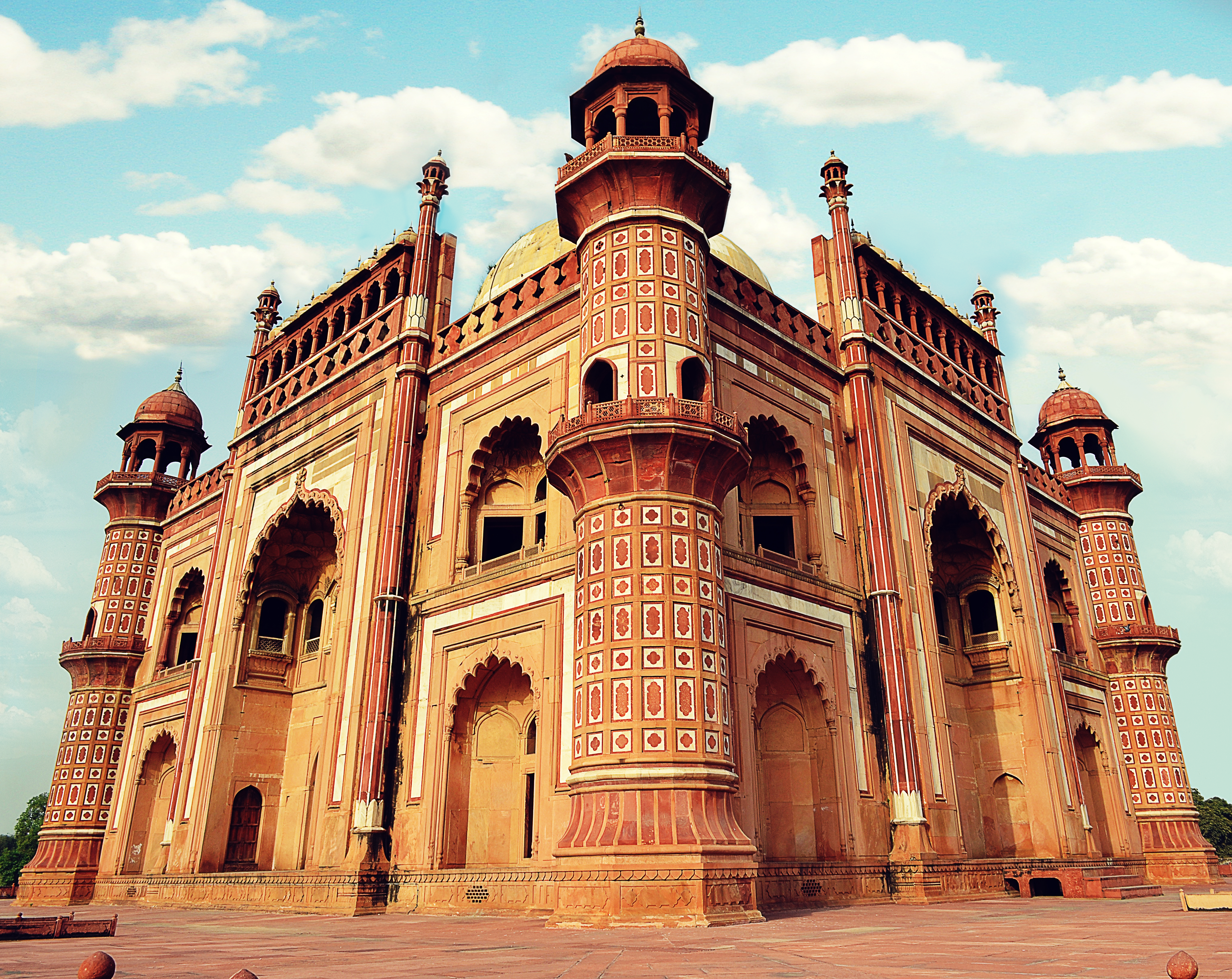
Safdarjung's Tomb was built in 1754 in the late Mughal architectural style for Nawab Safdarjung.

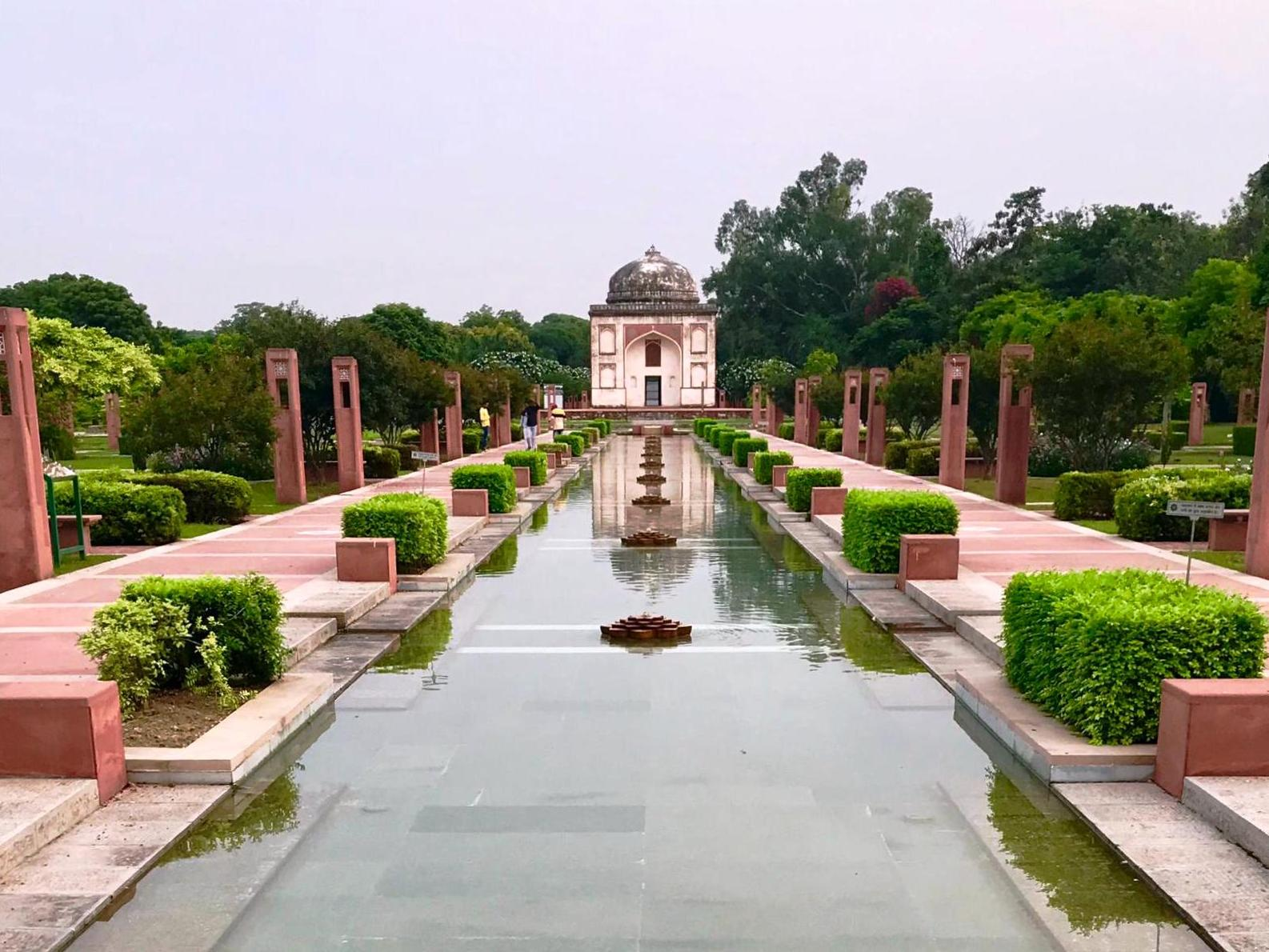
Sunder Nursery formerly called Azim Bagh

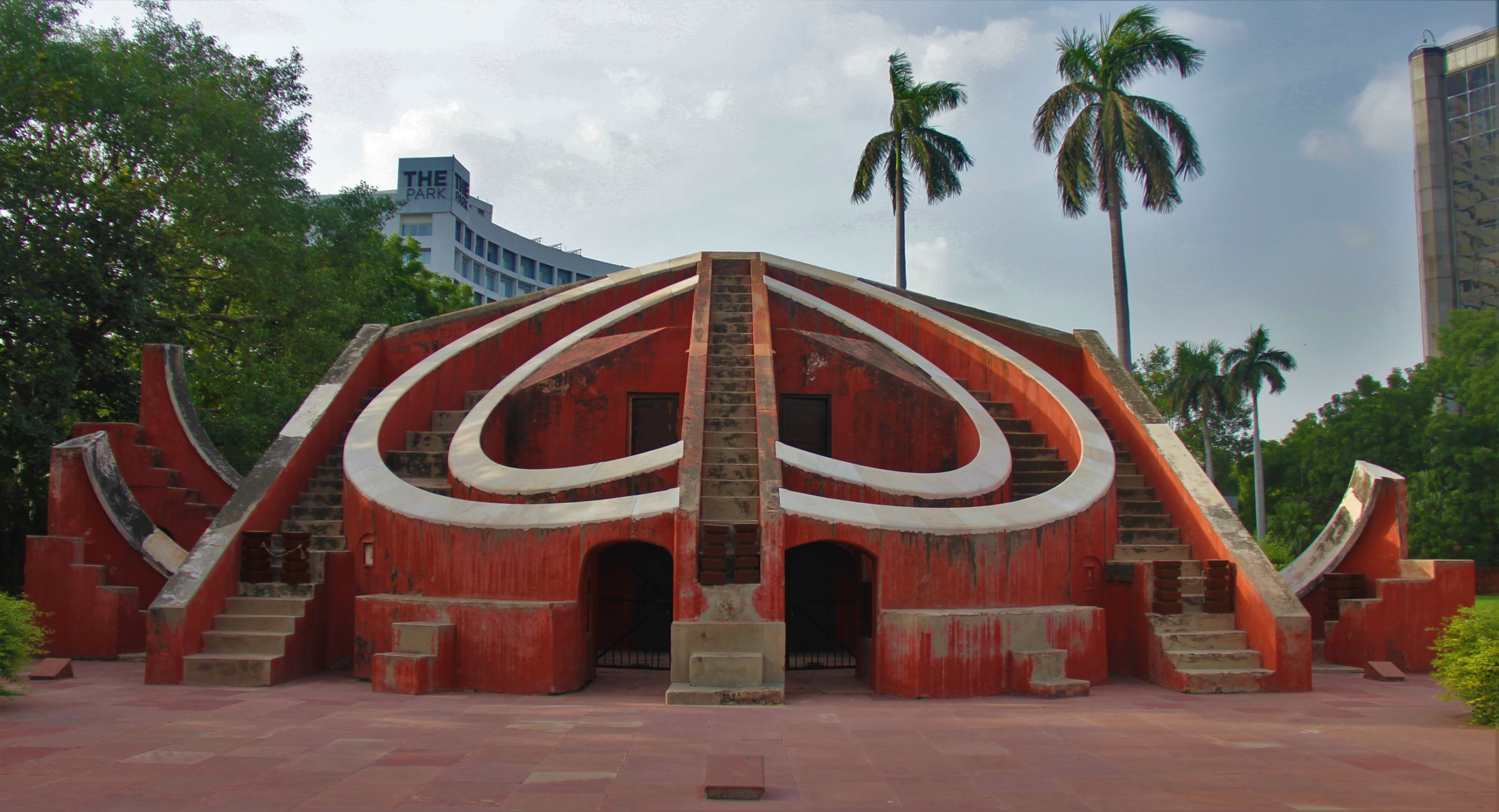
Jantar Mantar observatory

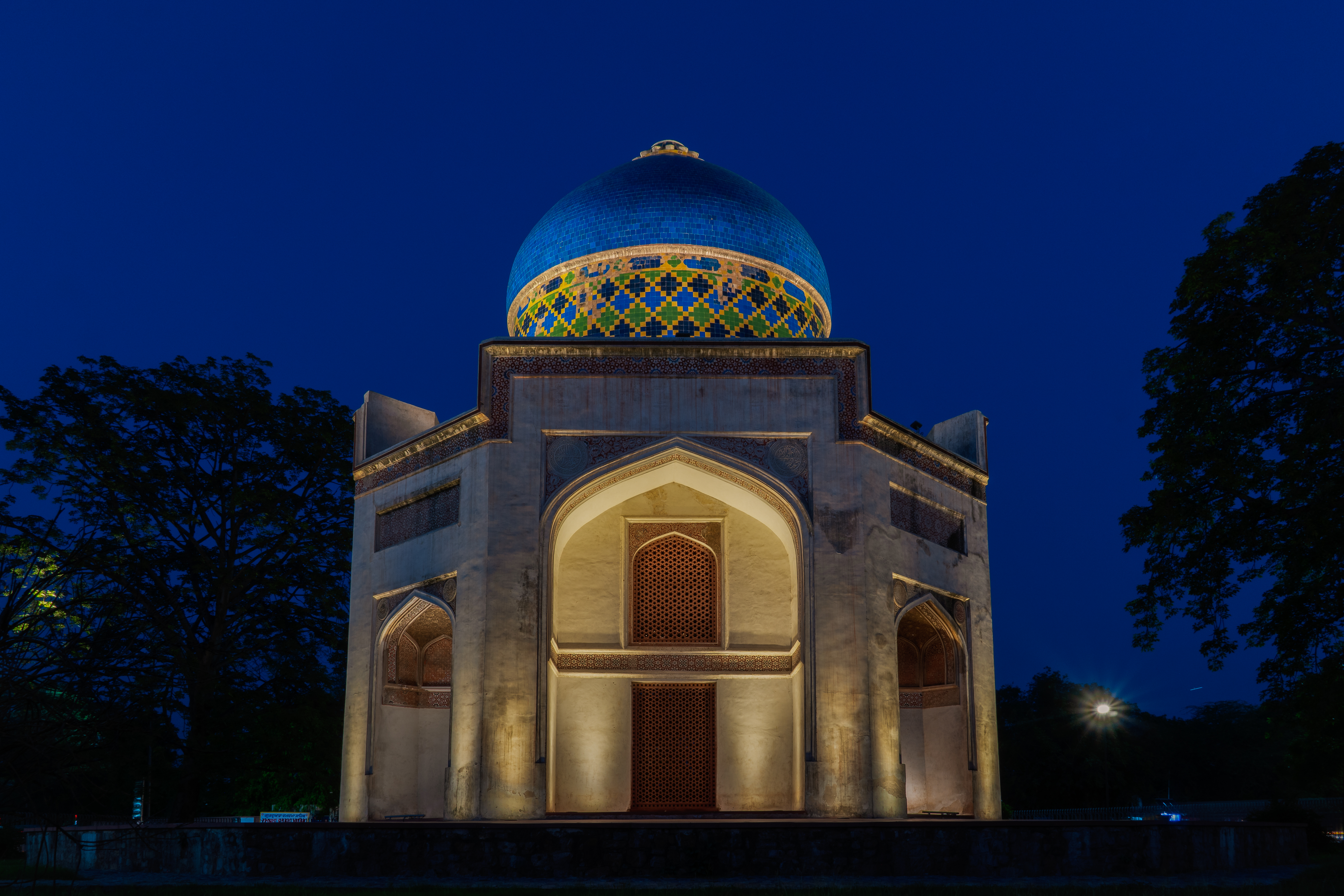
Sabz Burj octagonal Mughal-era mausoleum

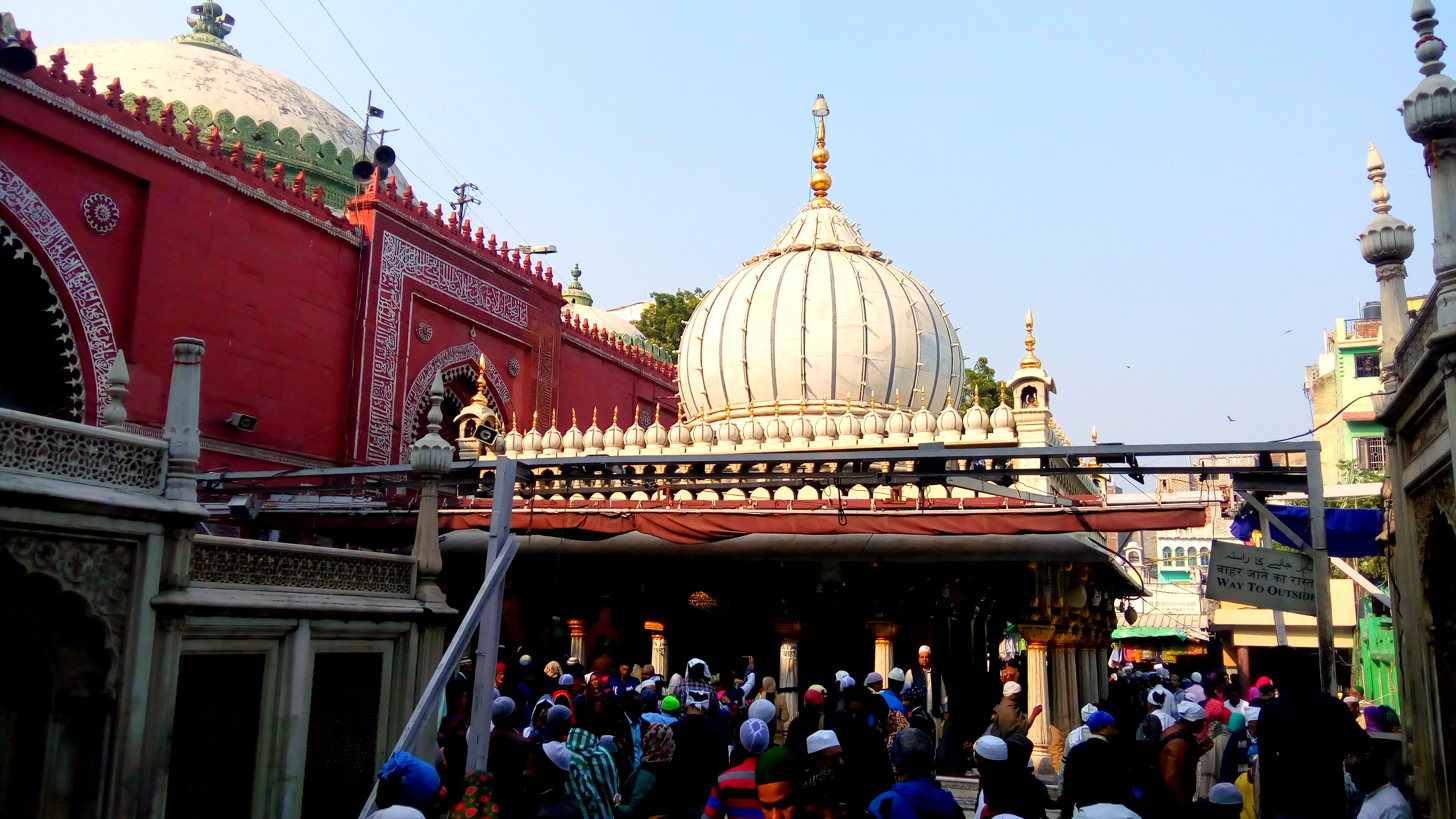
Nizamuddin Dargah

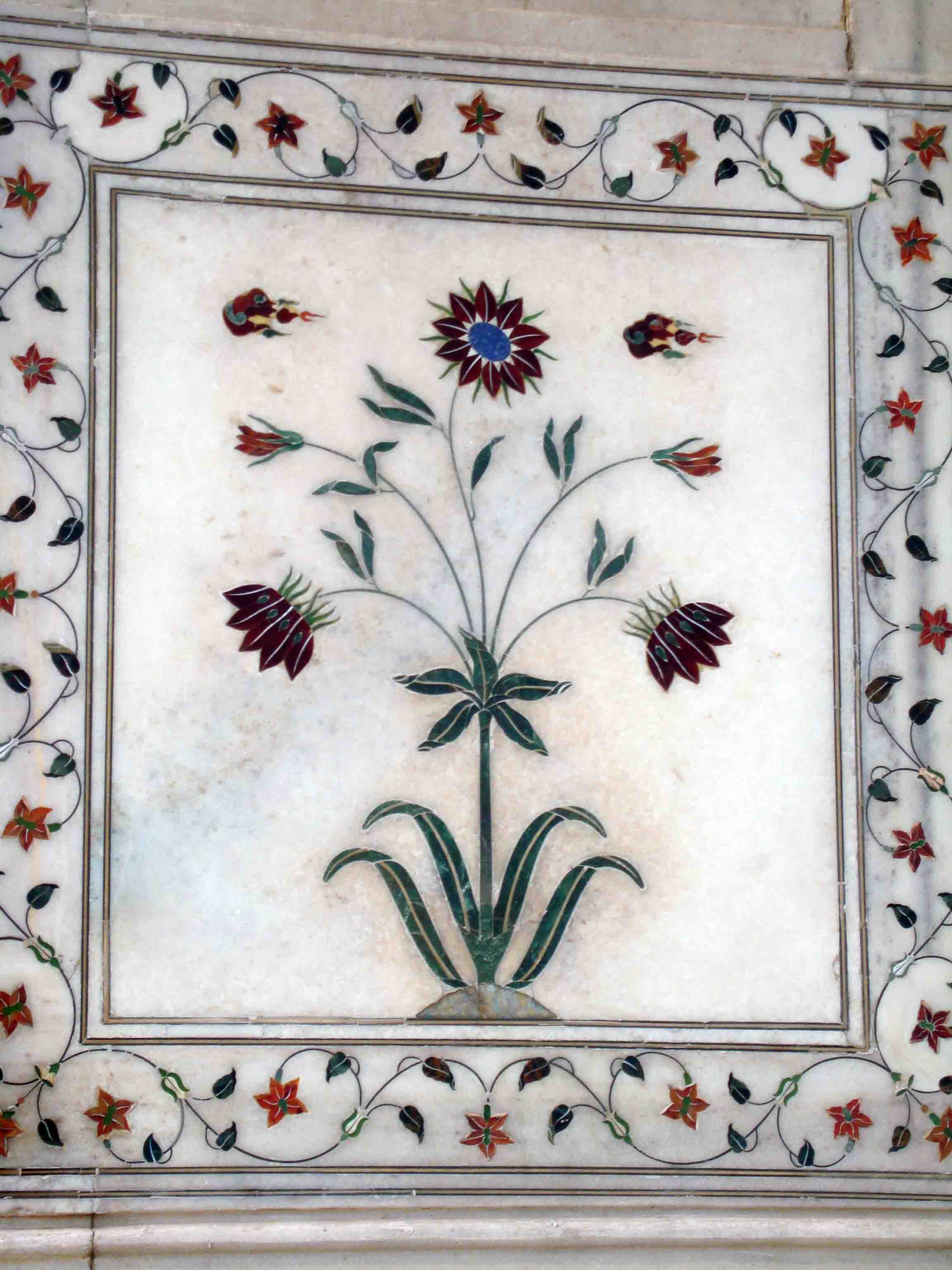
Diwan-i-Khas (Red Fort) interior

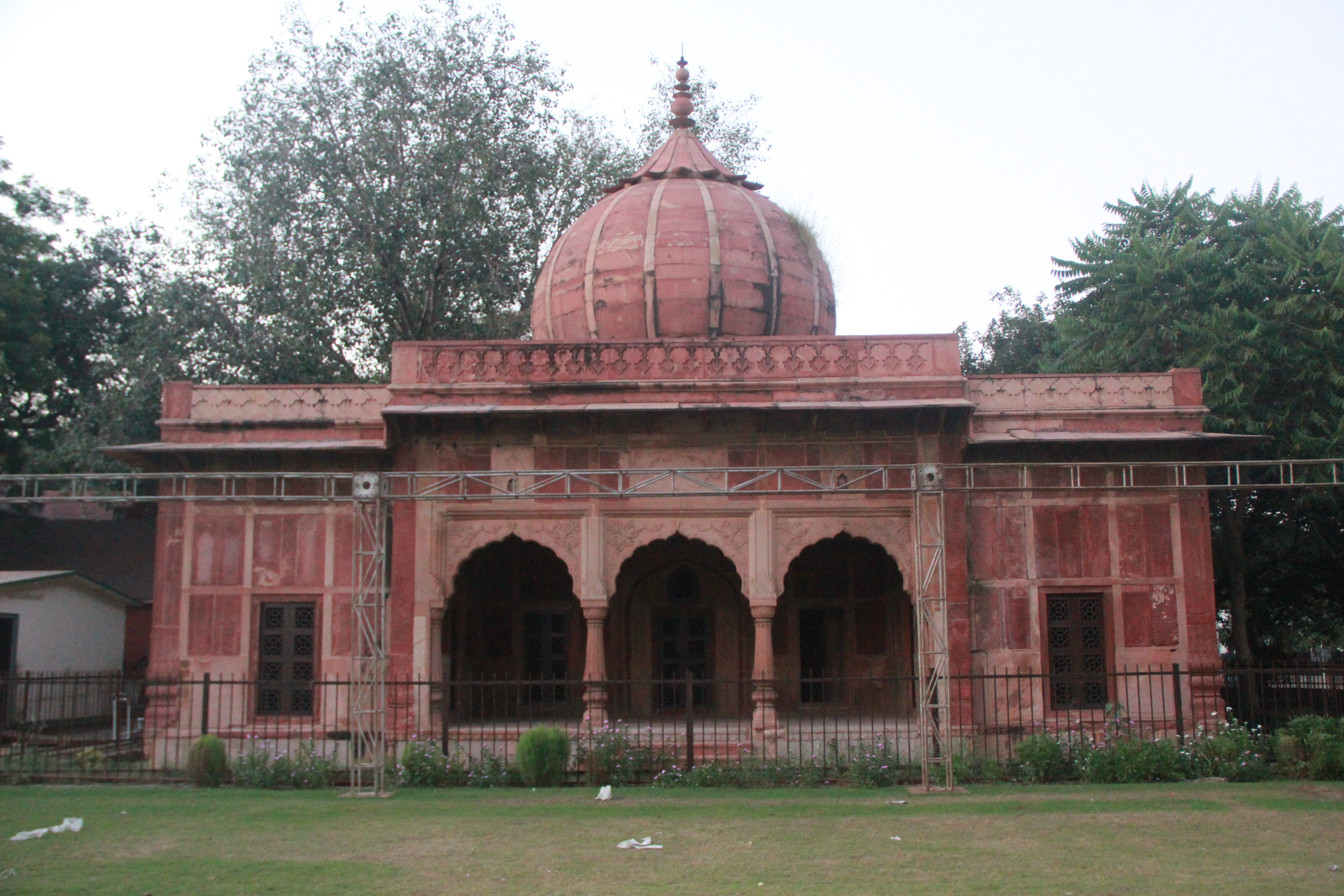
Lal Bangla

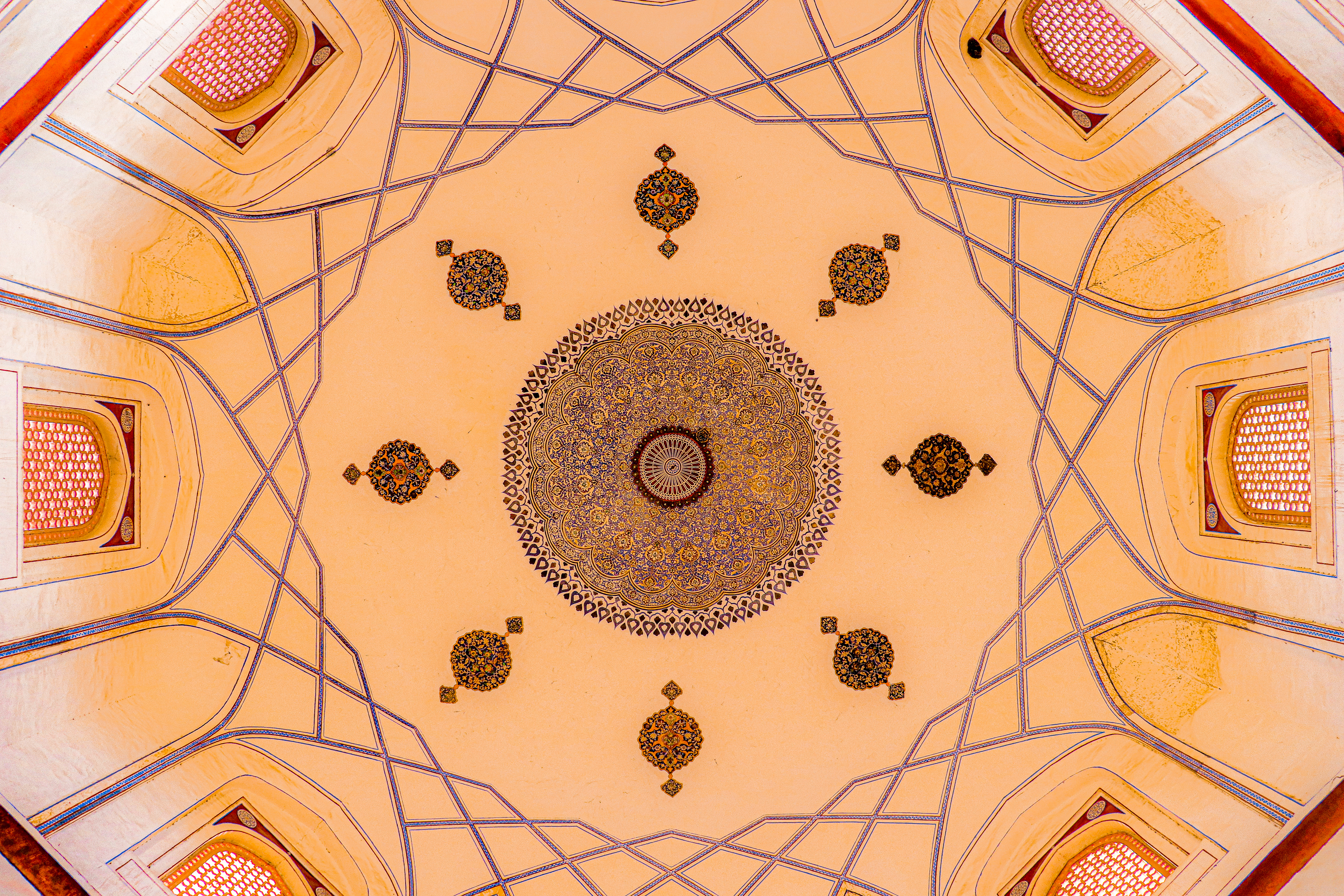
Nila Gumbad inside

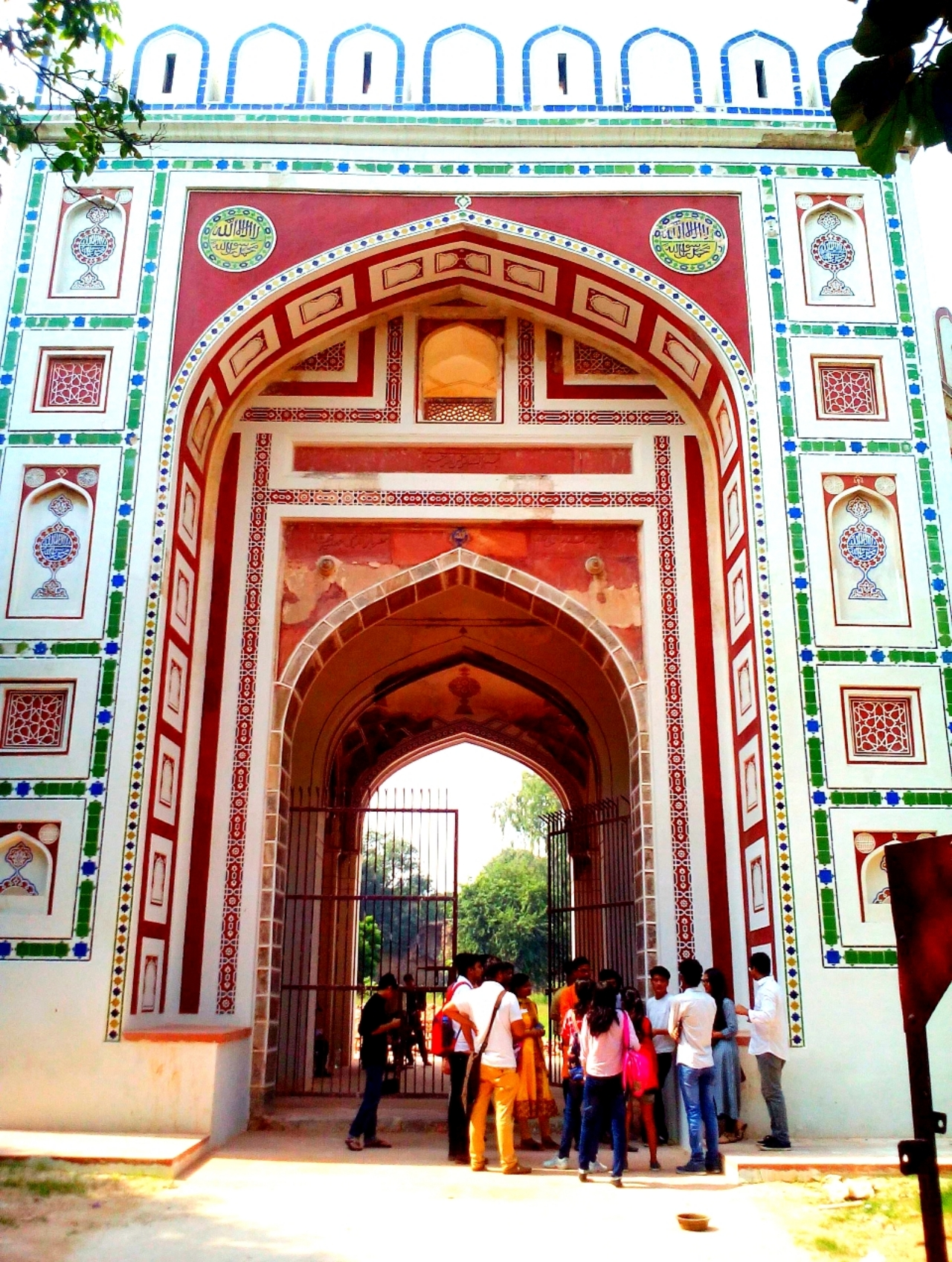
Arab Serai a 16th century caravanserai

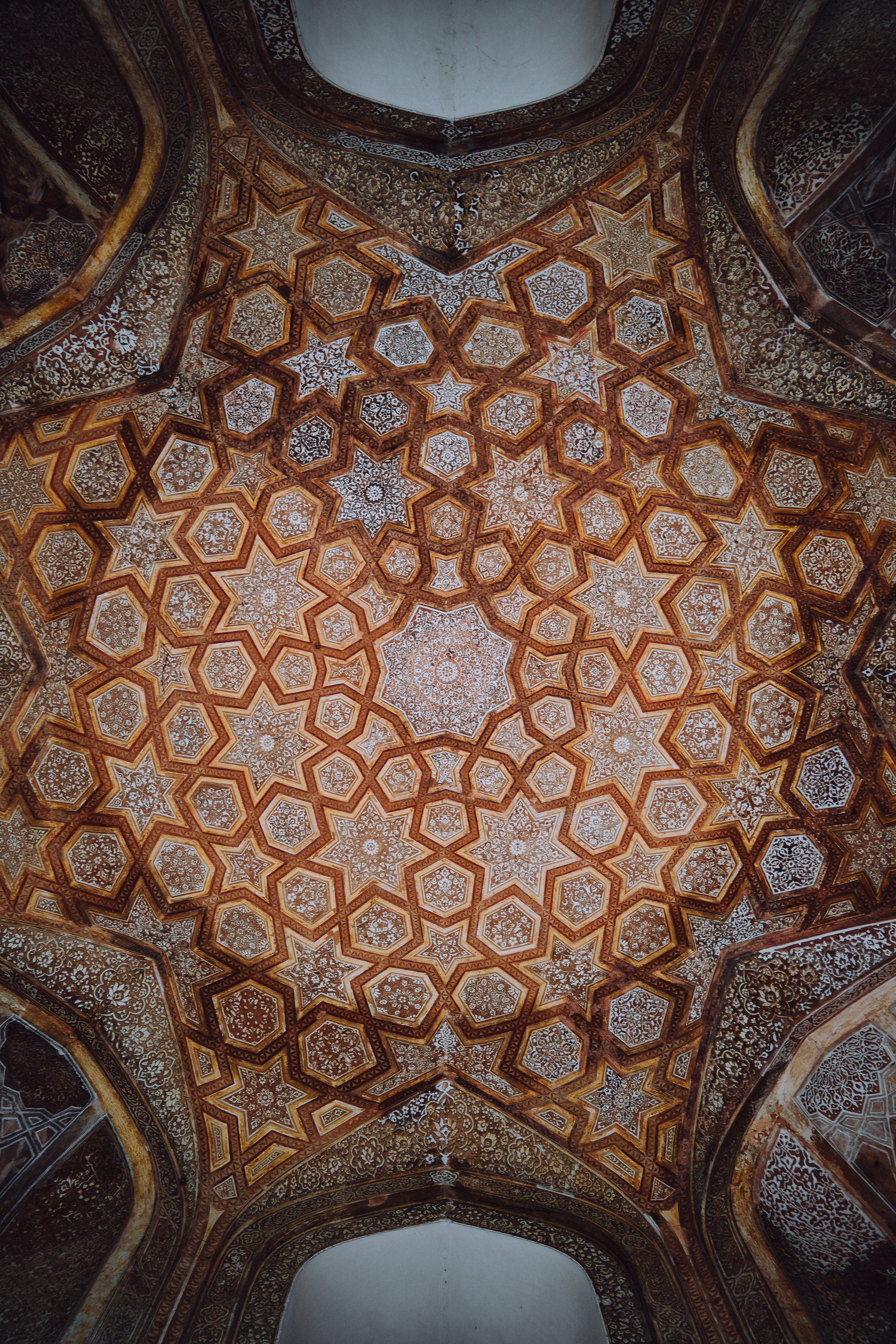
decorative dome inside Sunder Burj from the Sunder Nursery

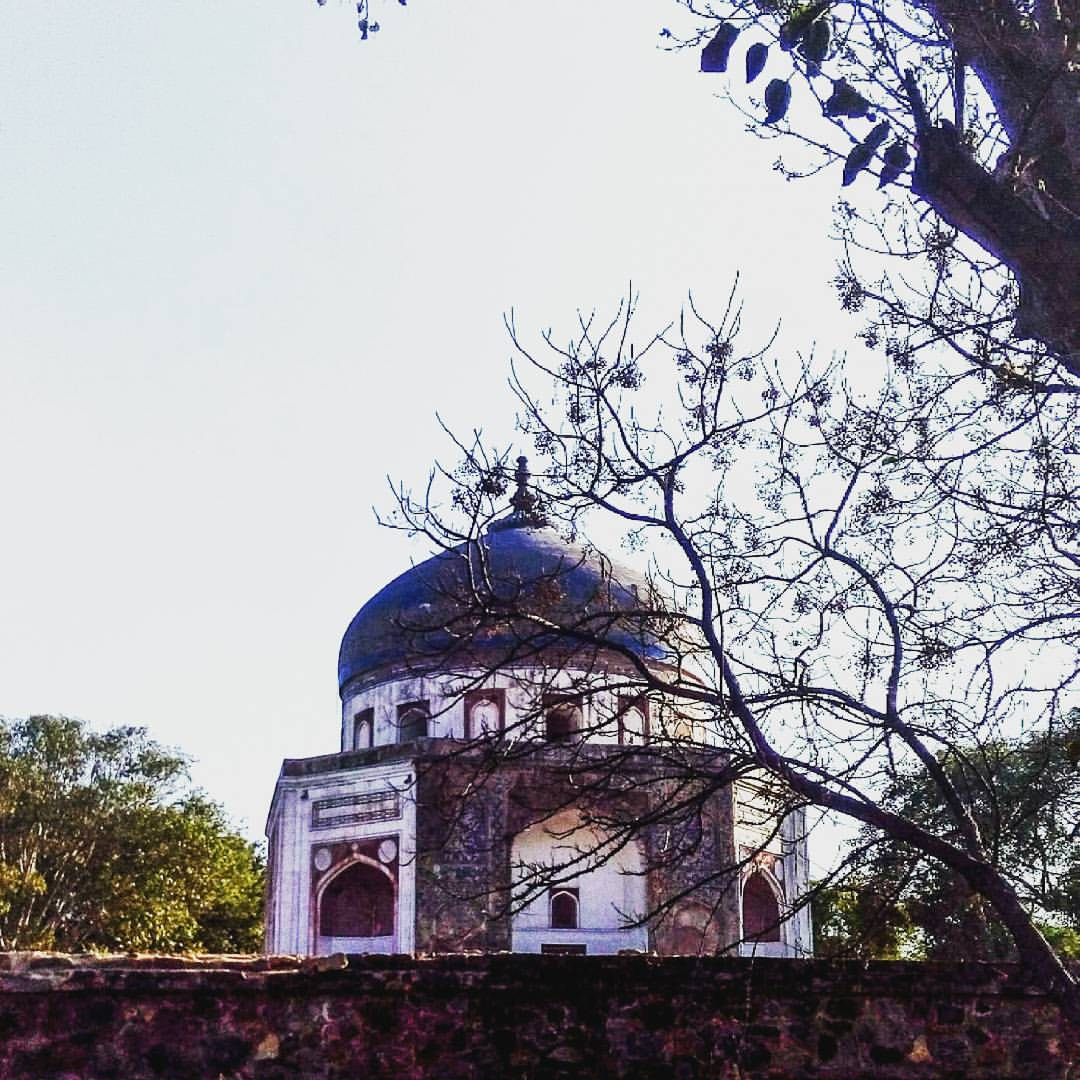
Nila Gumbad

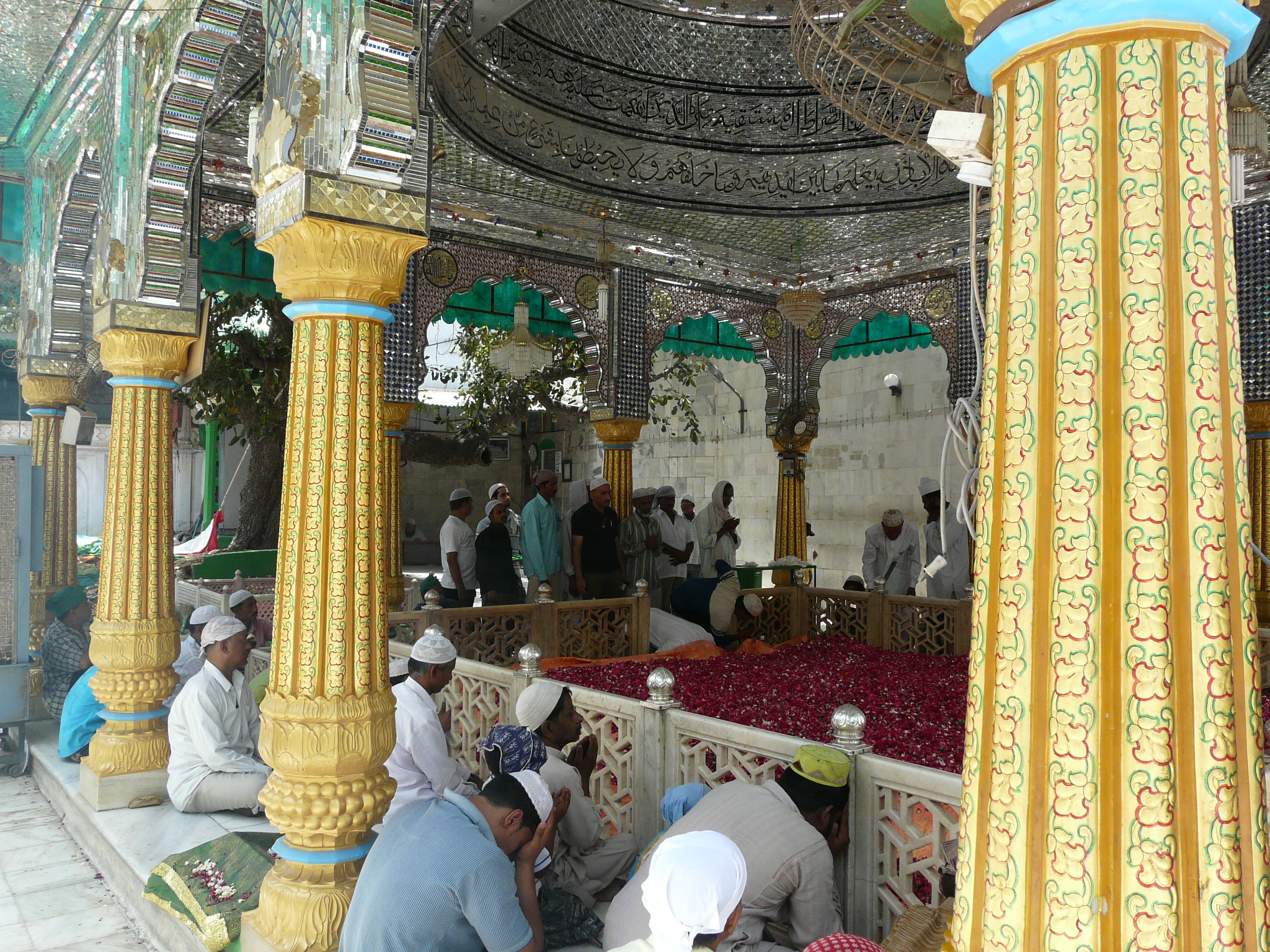
Shrine of Qutbuddin Bakhtiar Kaki

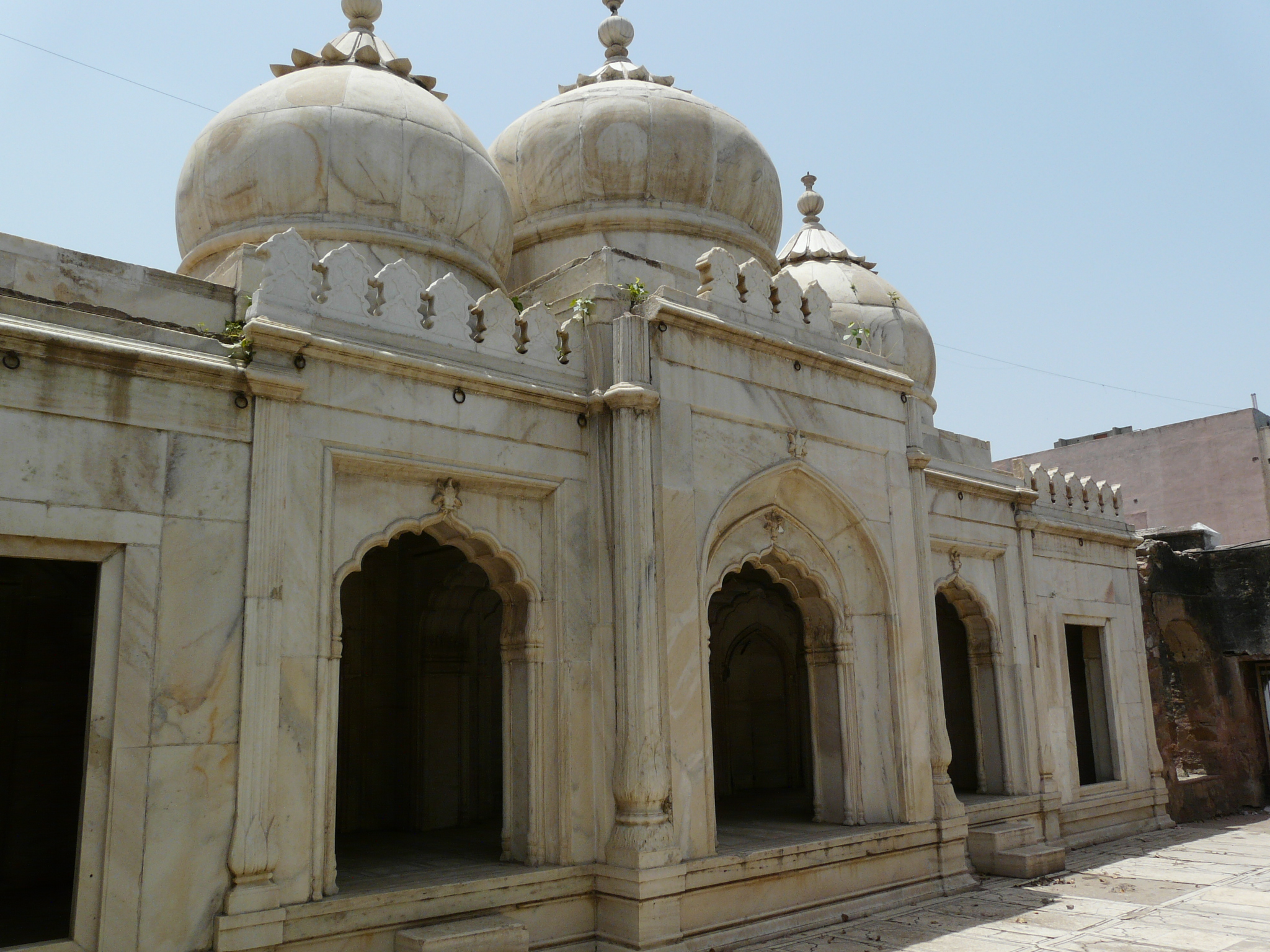
Moti Masjid (Mehrauli)

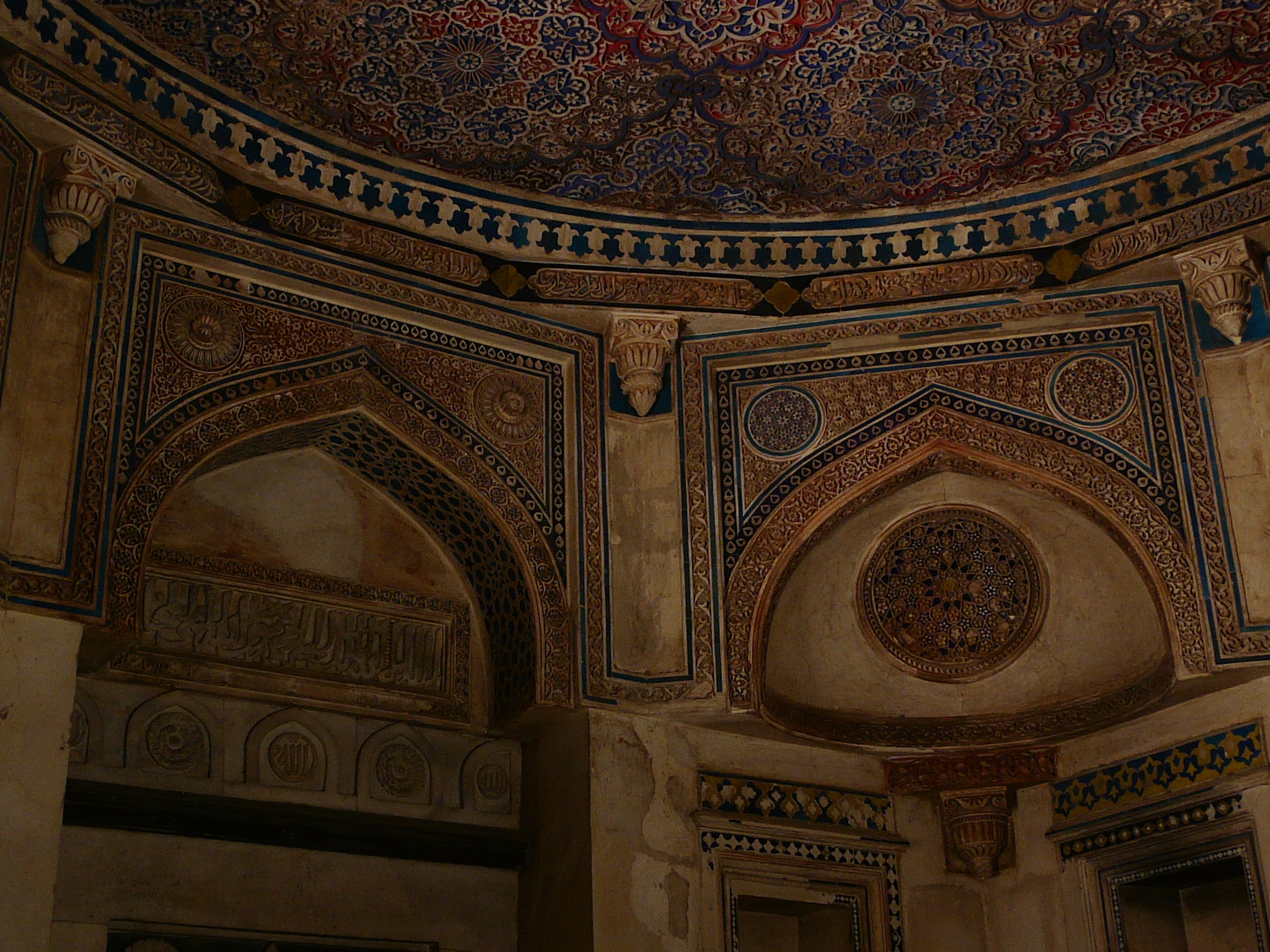
Jamali Kamali tomb interior

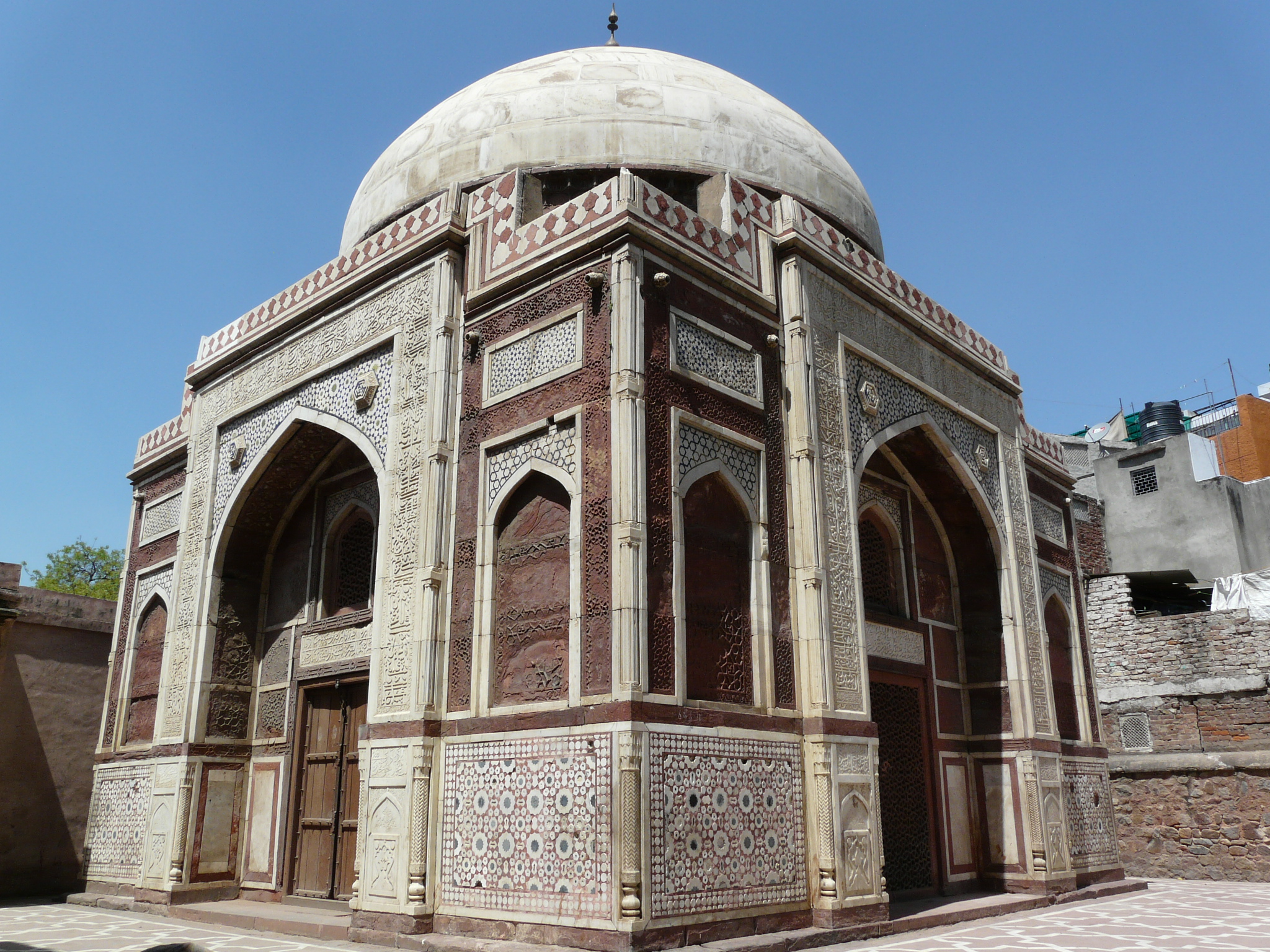
Tomb of Ataga Khan

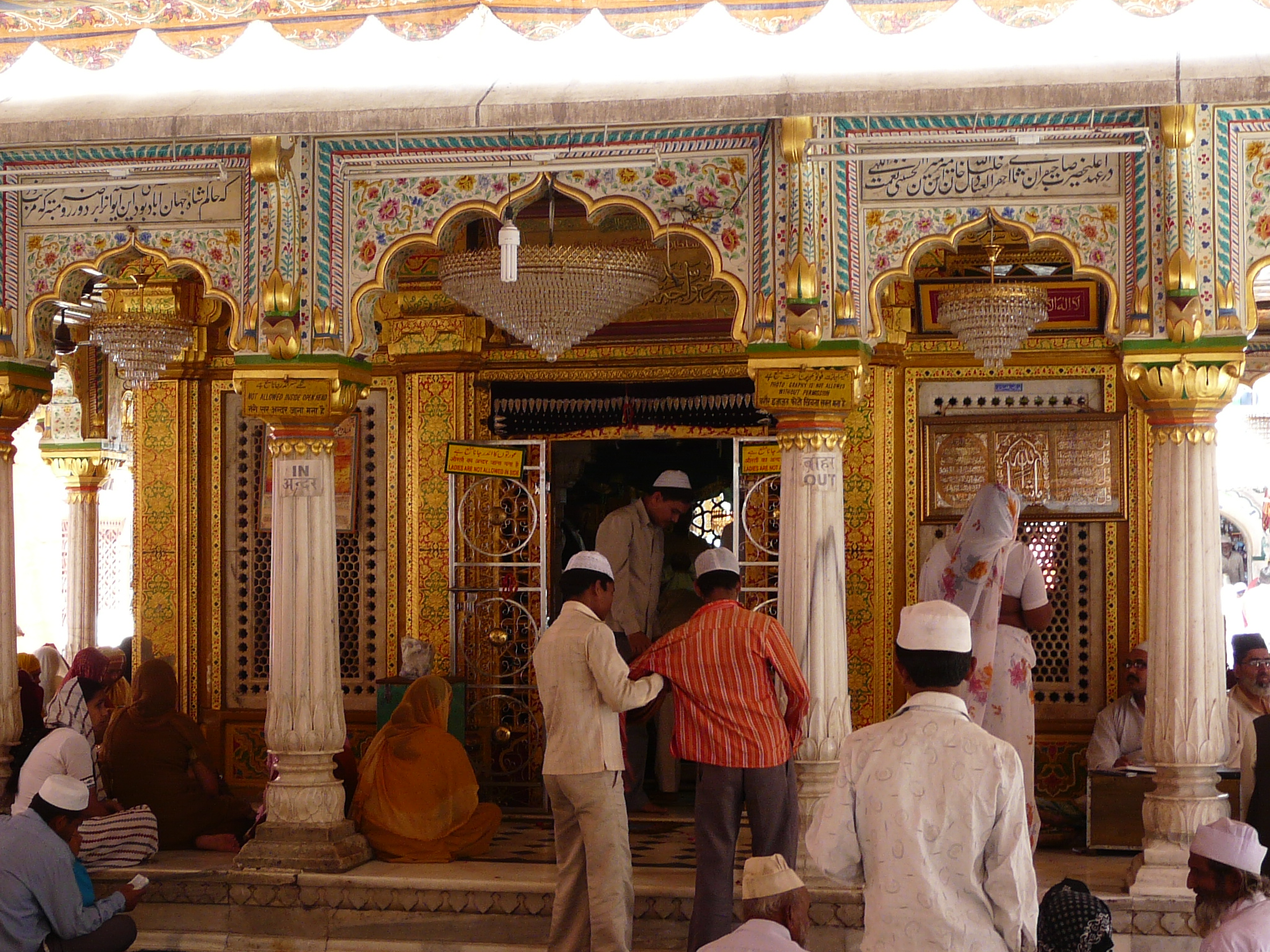
Nizamuddin Dargah interior

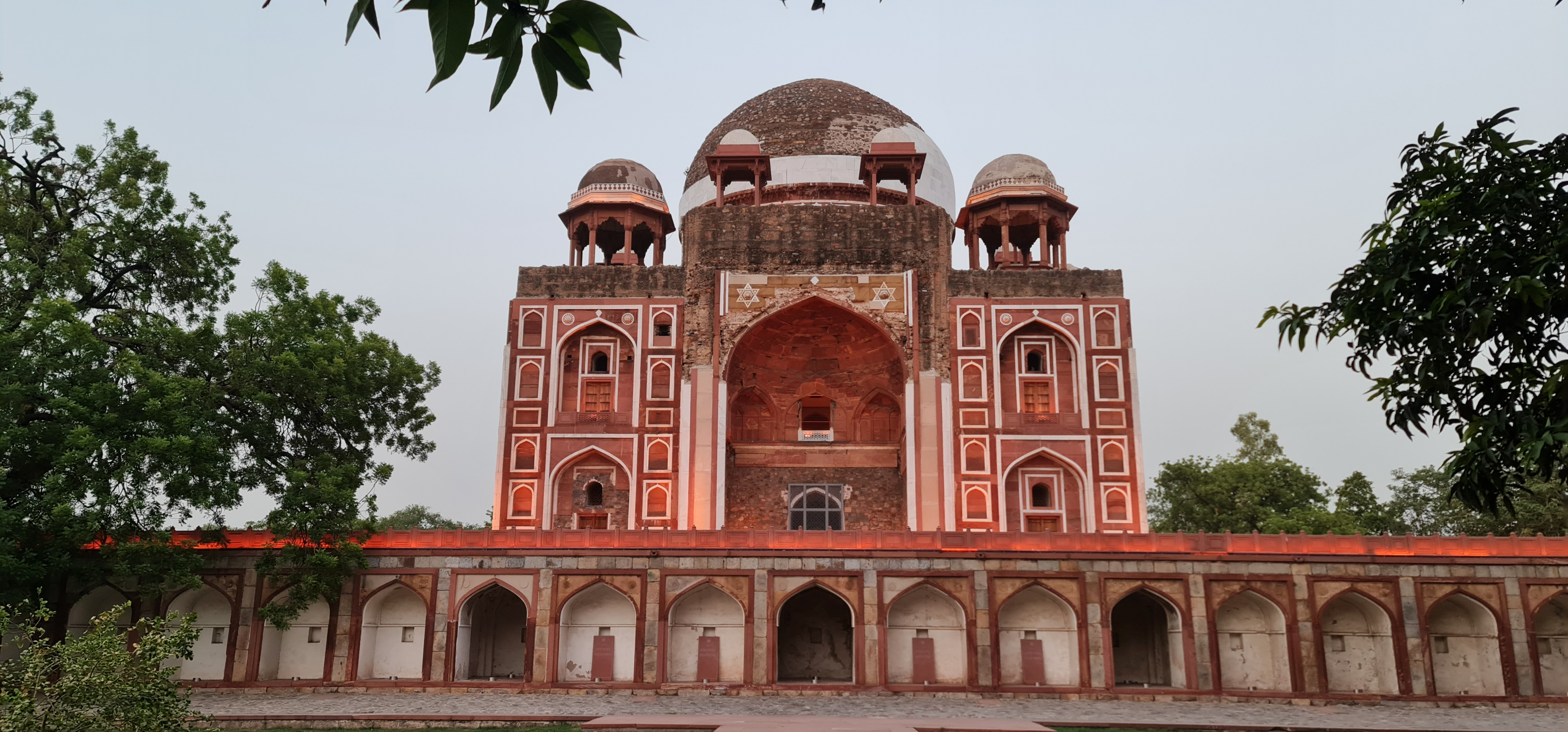
Abdul Rahim Khan-i-Khanan tomb

Mughal Architecture emerged as a form of the architecture of Islamic Persia and Central Asia and Indo-Islamic architecture during the rule of the Mughal Empire. Mughal architecture is characterized by large bulbous onion domes, the use of white marble and red sandstone, delicate ornamentation work, and large buildings surrounded by gardens on all four sides.

The Humayun's Tomb is the first notable example of Mughal architecture in Delhi in the National Capital Region. Except for a few architectures like Humayun's Tomb and Purana Qila, most of the architectural work of this period was done in Shah Jahan's time or later. This period also saw building of 18th century Astronomical Observatory called Jantar Mantar.

Another important achievement of this period was building of Mughal gardens. Its design was inspired by Persian Char Bagh Gardens. Some gardens built during Mughal period are garden built in front of Humayun's Tomb, Roshanara Bagh, Qudsia Bagh and Garden built in Safdarjang's tomb complex.

== British Colonial period ==
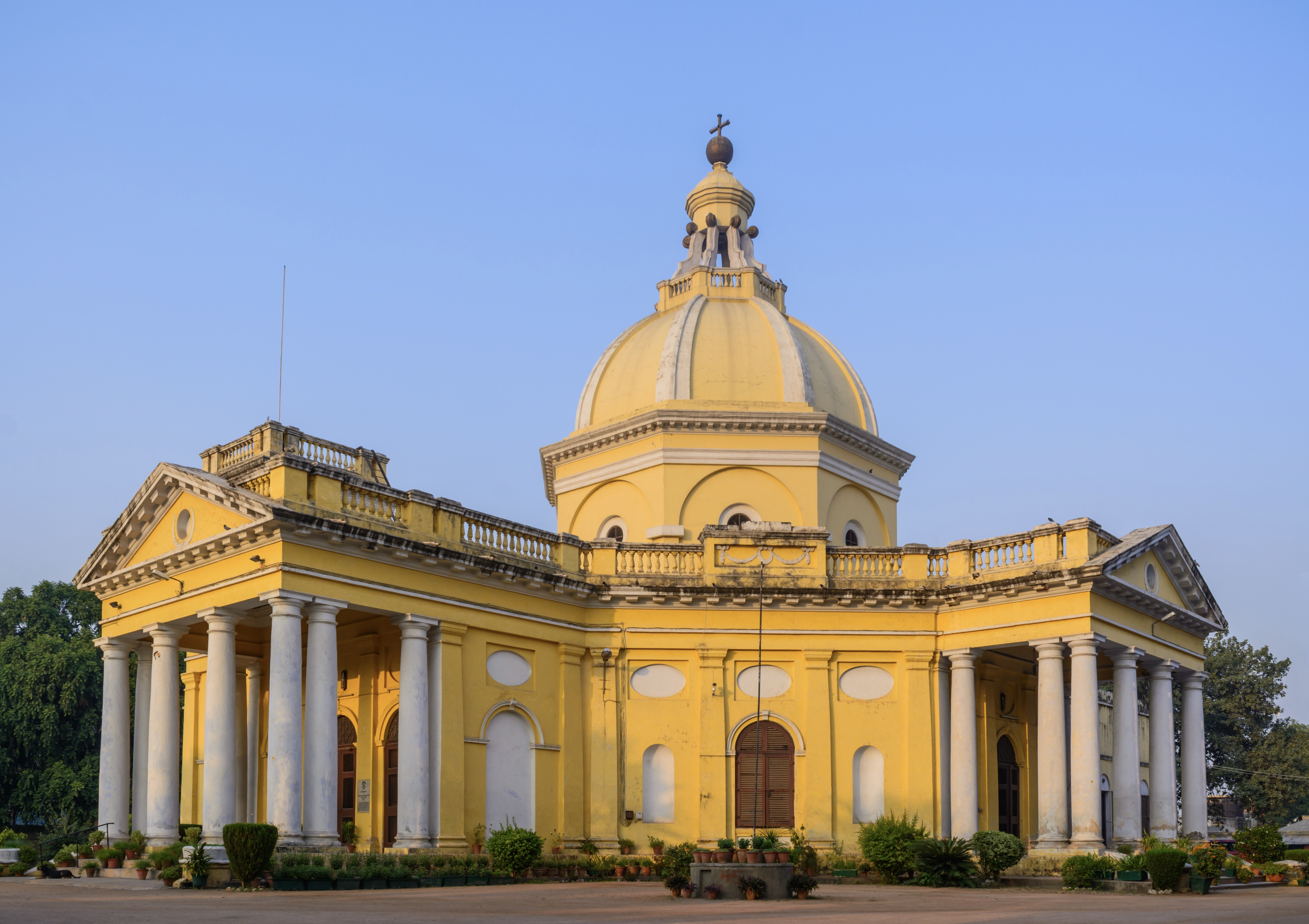
St. James' Church was designed in the Renaissance Revival style and completed in 1836. It is situated on a cruciform plan and consists of neoclassical style porticoes, with a baroque dome in the center.

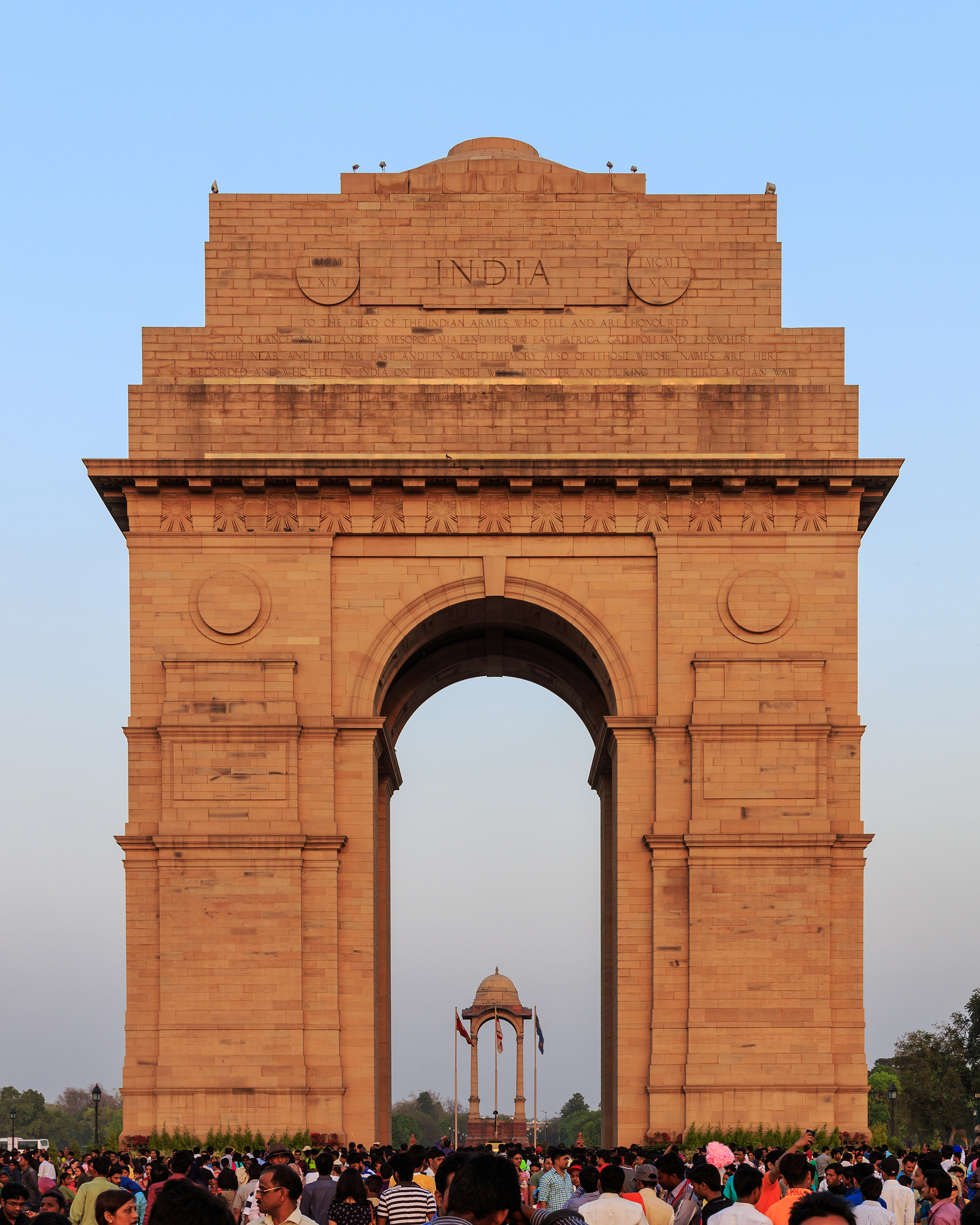
The India Gate is a triumphal arch and war memorial in the middle of New Delhi. It was designed by Edwin Lutyens and completed in 1921.

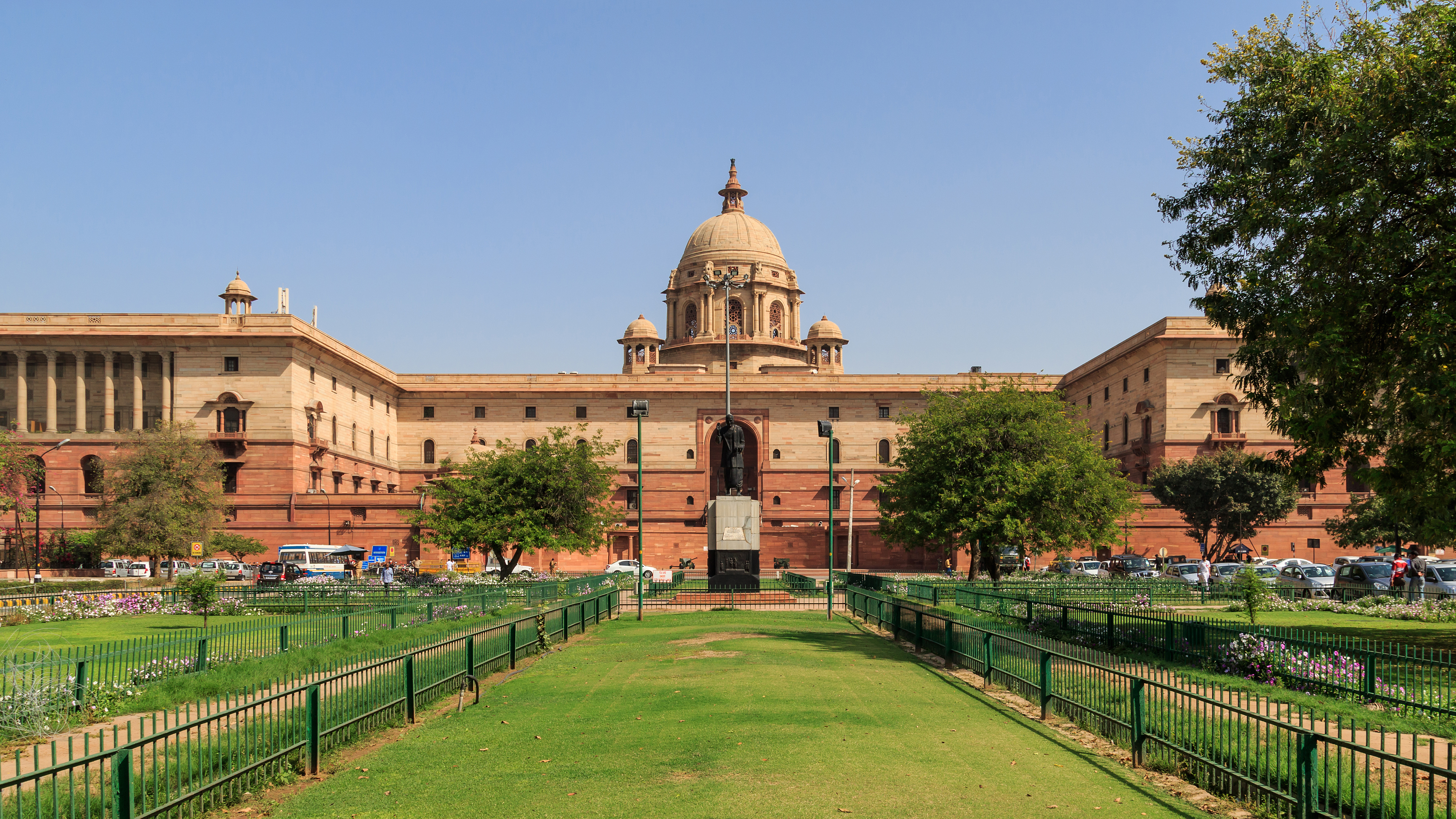
The Secretariat Building was designed by Herbert Baker and completed in 1927.

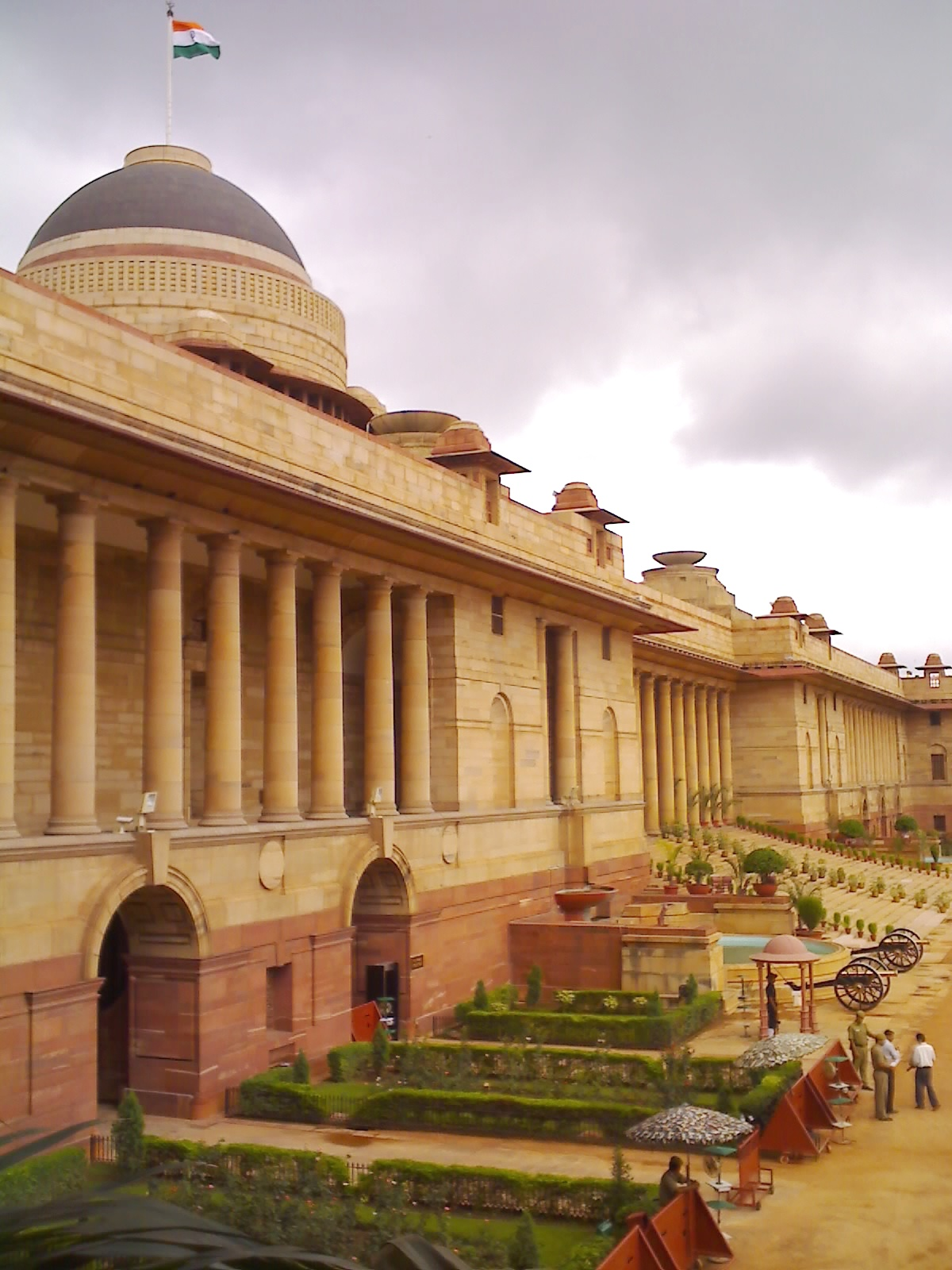
The Rashtrapati Bhawan was the residence of the British Viceroy, and now serves as the residence of the President of India. It was designed by Edwin Lutyens and completed in 1929.

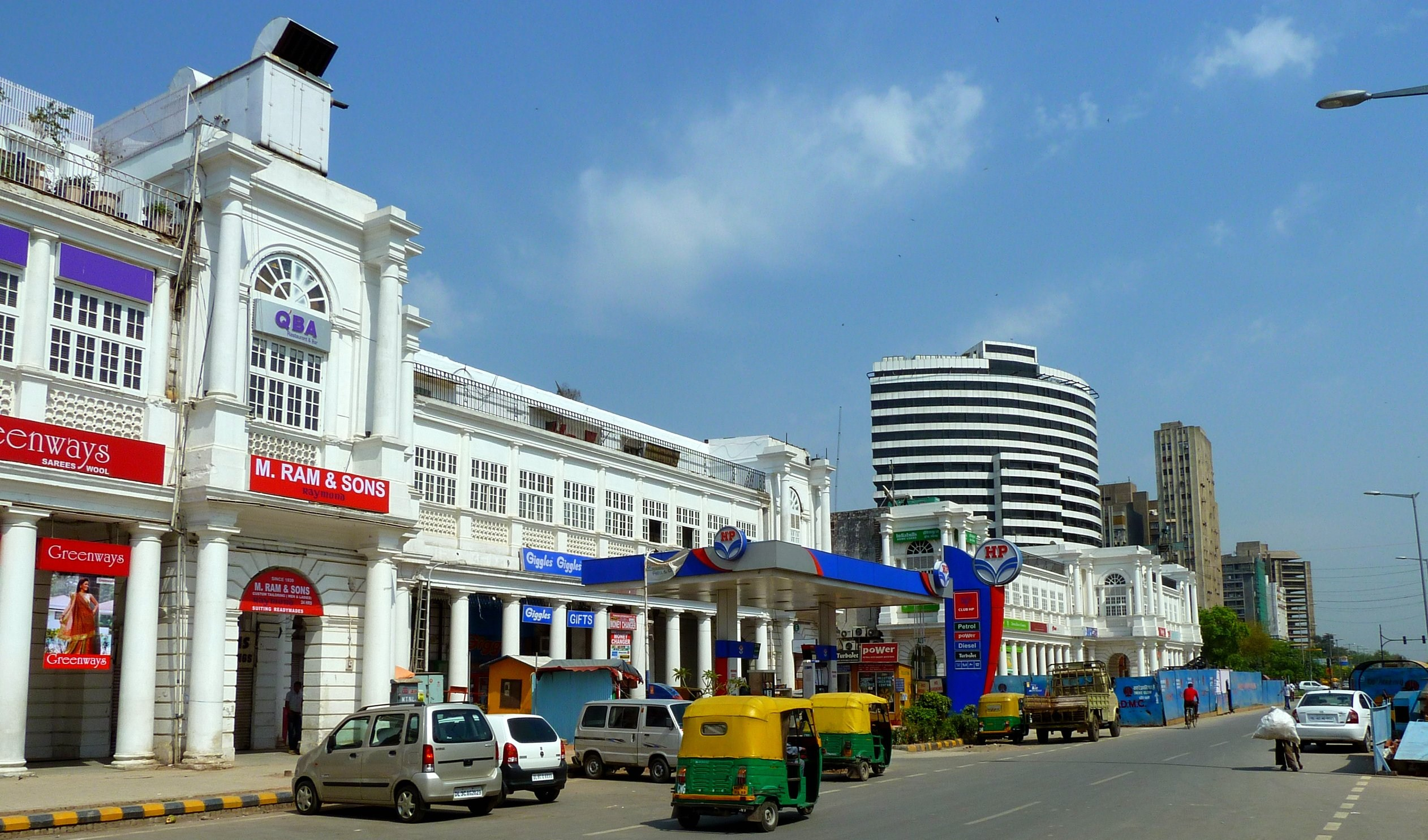
Connaught Place was designed in the Georgian style by Robert Tor Russell, and completed in 1933.

After Delhi was declared the site for a new capital of India, George V laid the foundation of New Delhi, which would serve as the capital. The British invited Edwin Lutyens and Herbert Baker to design the government buildings. This area would also be called Lutyens' Delhi in honor of the architect. Members of Lutyens' team of architects included Walter Sykes George, Arthur Gordon Shoosmith and Henry Medd. It is reported that Lutyens was reluctant to incorporate Indian features in his style, but later conceded.

== Post-Independence and the establishment of the National Capital Region ==
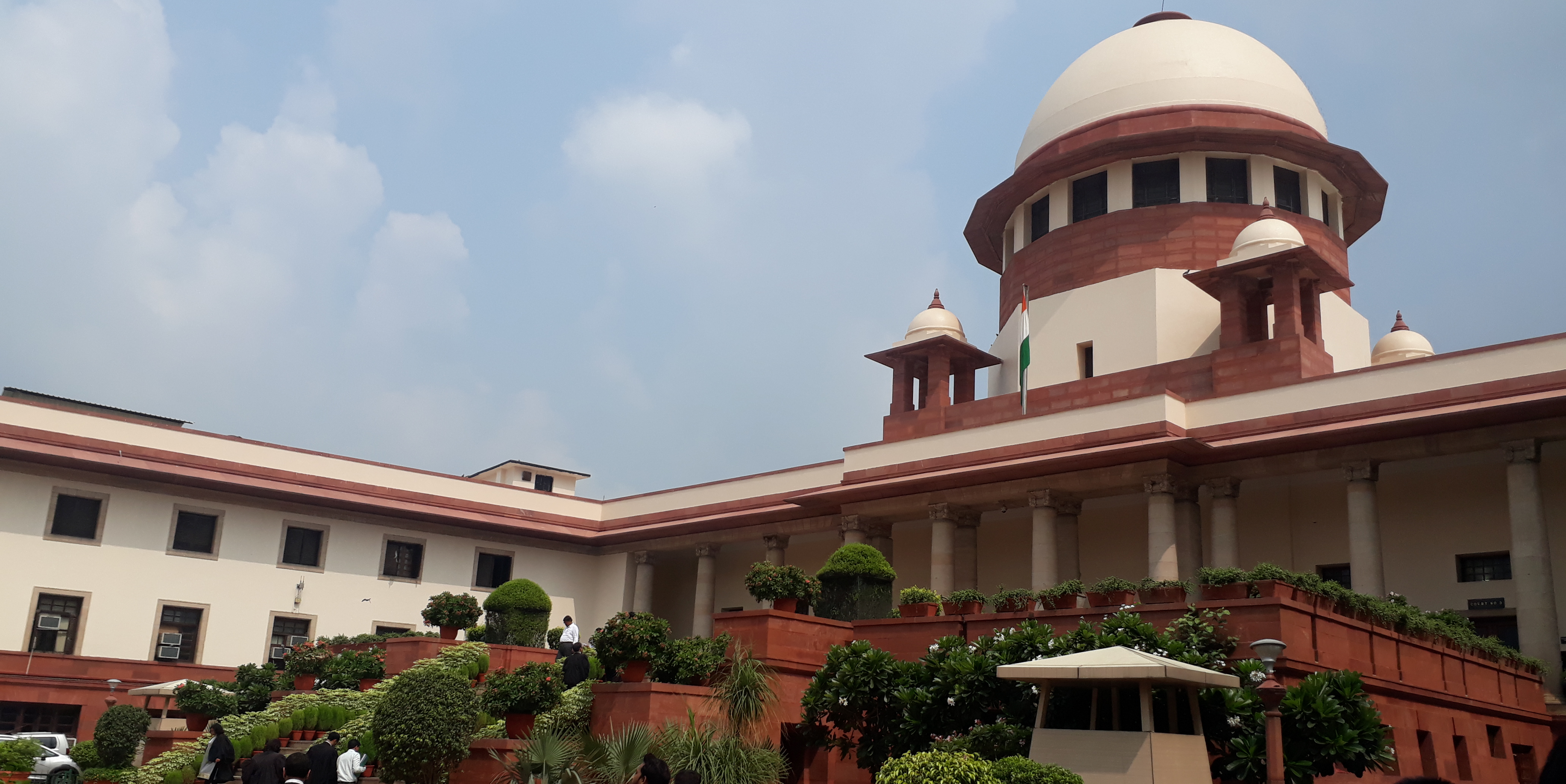
The Supreme Court of India was designed by Ganesh Bhikaji Deoalikar and completed in 1958. Its style was inspired by the Lutyens-Baker buildings.

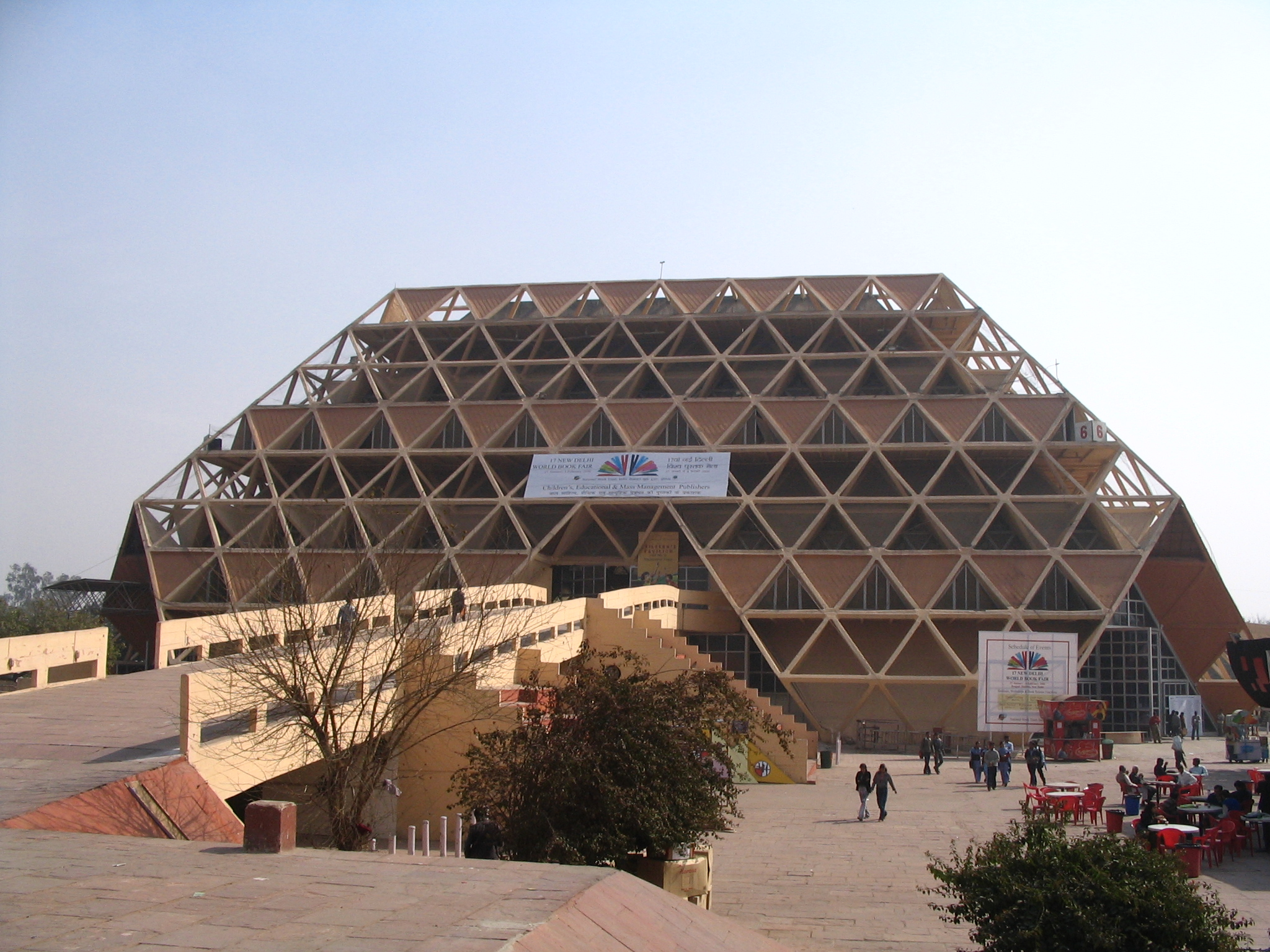
The Hall of Nations, designed by Raj Rewal and completed in 1972 was regarded as one of the best examples of modernist architecture in India. It was demolished in 2017, despite several protests.

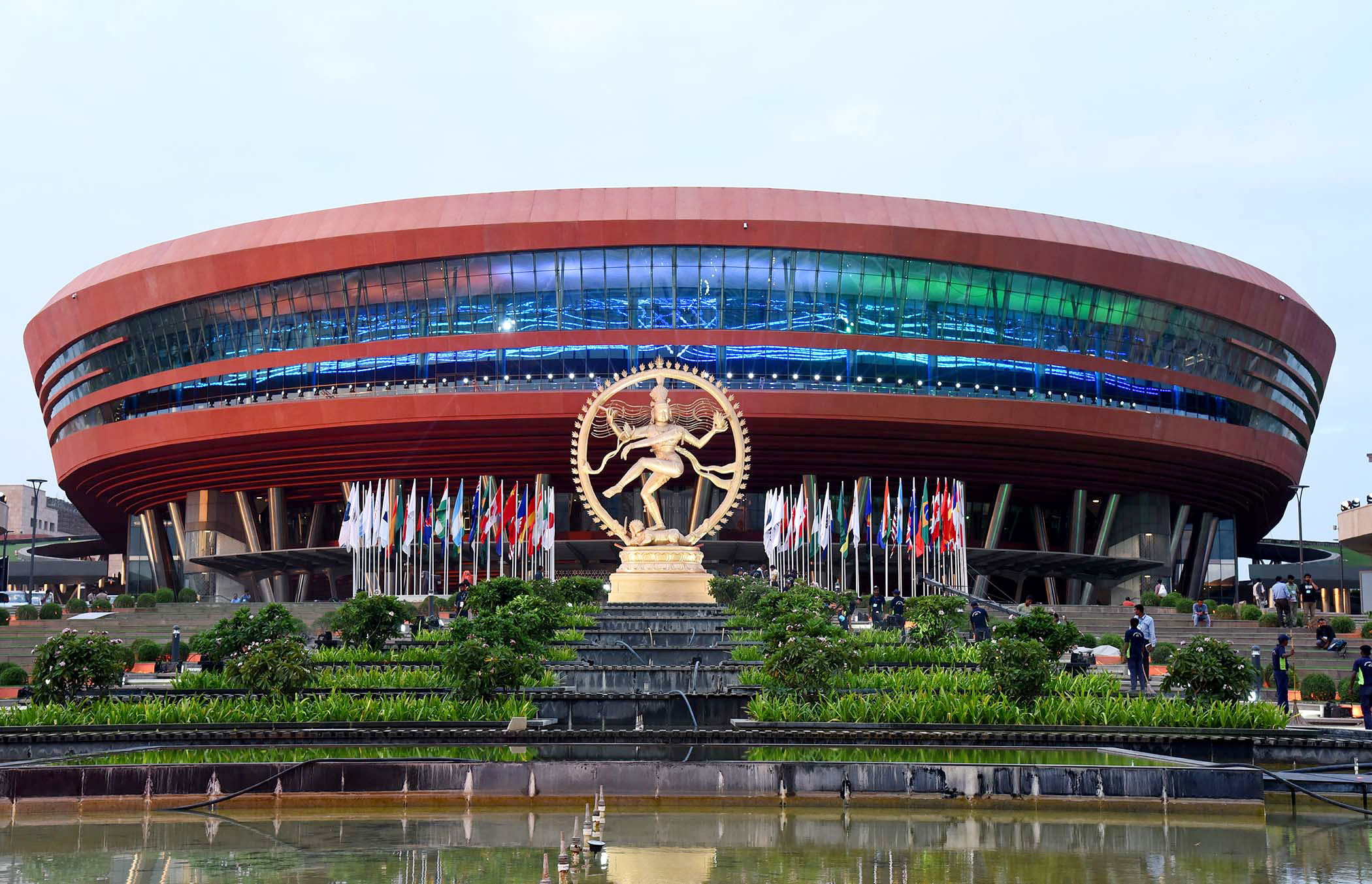
Bharat Mandapam is an exhibition hall

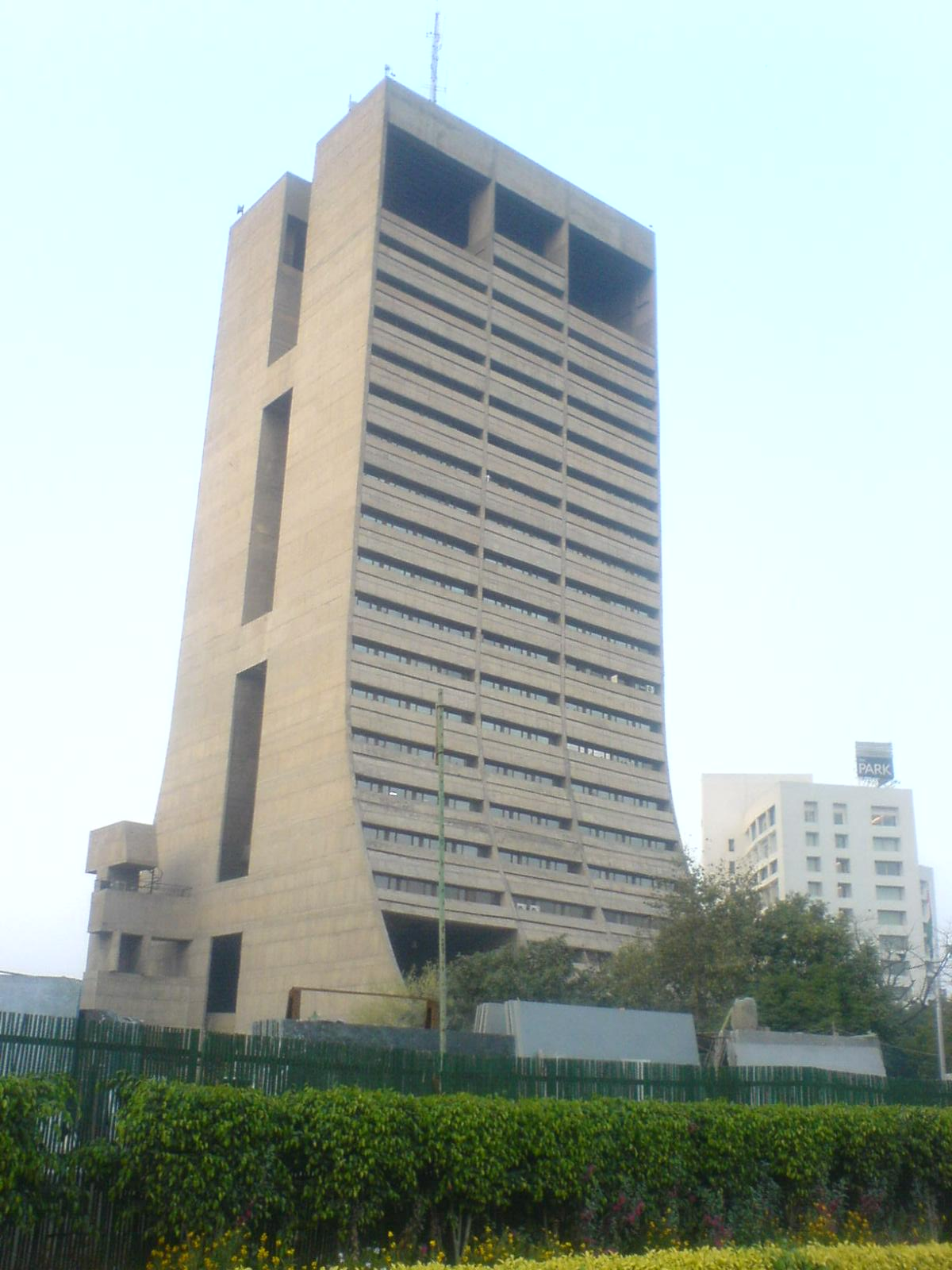
The New Delhi Municipal Council Building was designed in the brutalist style by Kuldip Singh, and completed in 1984.

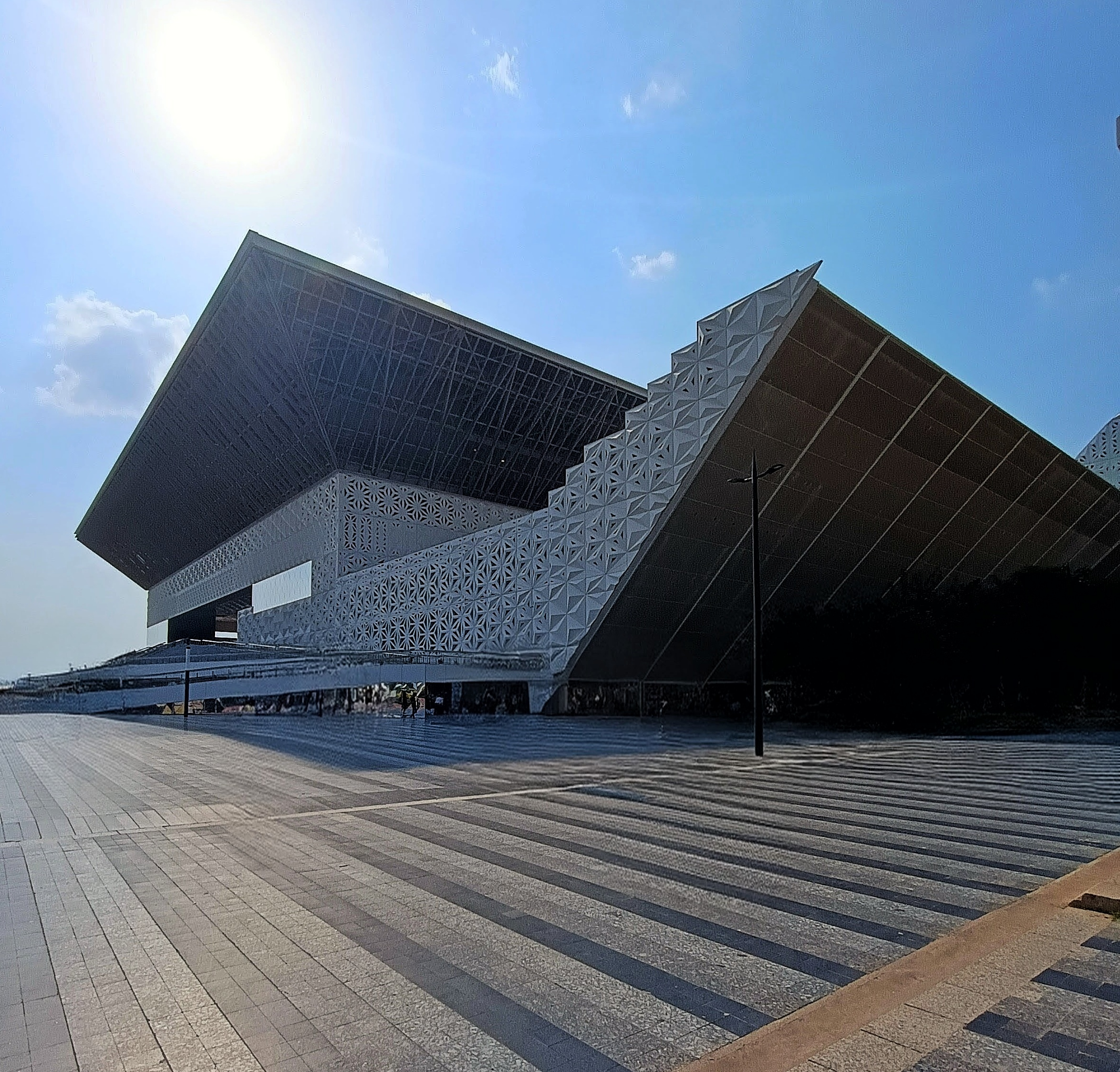
Yashobhoomi a convention center

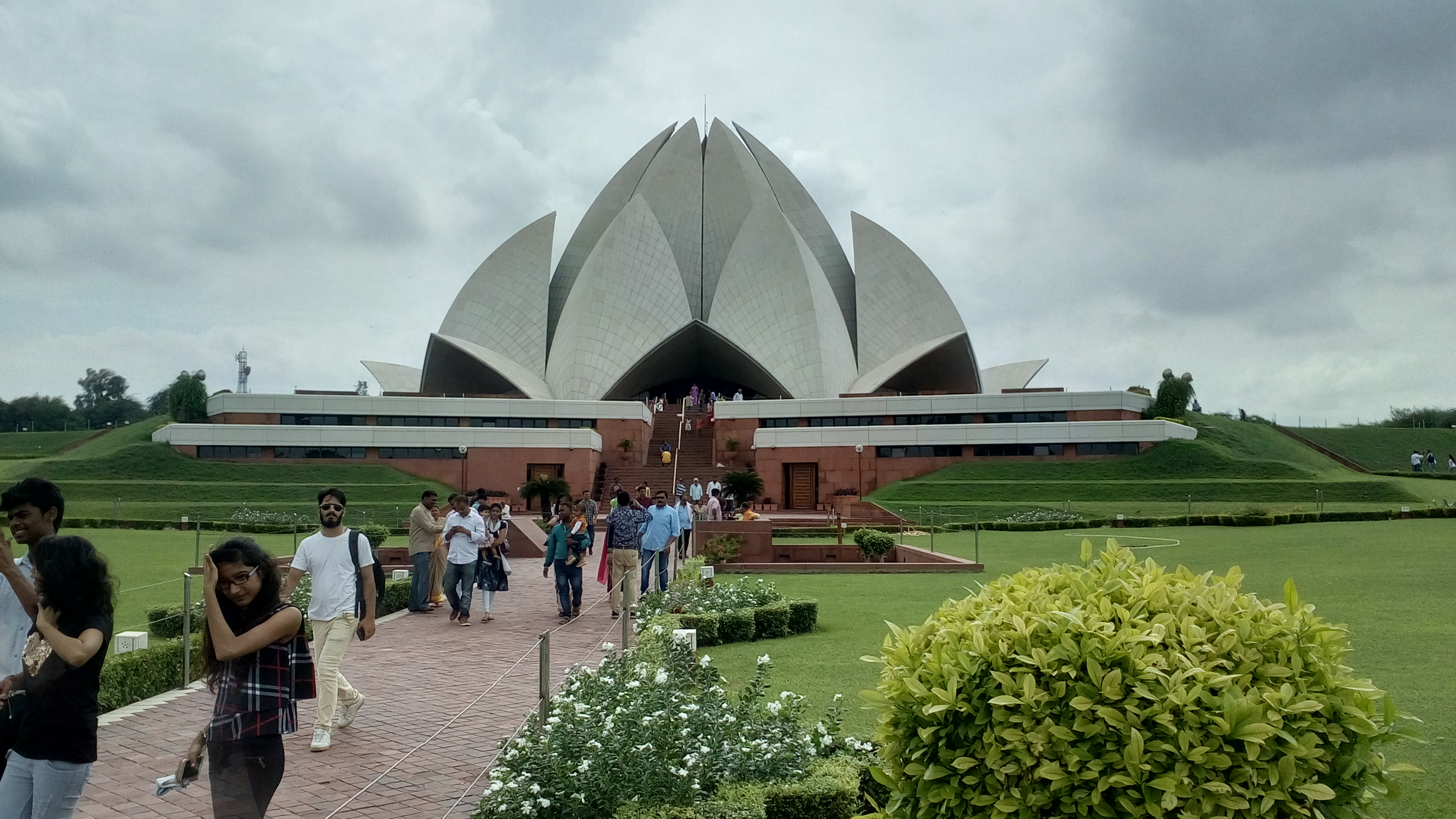
The Lotus Temple was designed by Faribohrz Sahba and completed in 1986. Its design was inspired by the shape of a lotus.

The Supreme Court of India was designed by Ganesh Bhikaji Deolalikar in the same style as that of the other major buildings in Lutyens' Delhi. However, modernist architecture became prevalent in Delhi as well as all over India, especially after the influence of Le Corbusier.

After Independence, the best examples of modern architecture in Delhi include IIT Delhi (1961) by Jugal Kishore Chodhury, Hall of Nations (1972) and Asian Games Village (1982) by Raj Rewal, Palika Kendra building (1984) by Kuldip Singh, and Lotus Temple (1986) by Fariborhz Sahba.

In 2017, the demolition of the Hall of Nations received worldwide condemnation from architectural enthusiasts. It was considered to be one of the best examples of modernist architecture in India in the National Capital Region.

The 21st century has seen a rise in high-rise buildings and skyscrapers, in Delhi especially in other parts of the wider National Capital Region.
