= Ganesh Bhikaji Deolalikar =

Indian architect

Ganesh Bhikaji Deolalikar (1895-1978) was an Indian architect and designed the main 1958 wing of the Supreme Court of India Building.

Born in Bombay Presidency in 1895, Deolalikar was the first Indian to head the Central Public Works Department.
