= List of tourist attractions in Delhi =

Tourism in Delhi in the National Capital Region has seen a growth in recent years. In 2024, India recorded approximately 9.95 million foreign tourist arrivals, while Delhi recorded 1.9 million that year, further underscoring Delhi’s pivotal role in national tourism dynamics. These are places of tourist attractions in Delhi.

== Government buildings ==
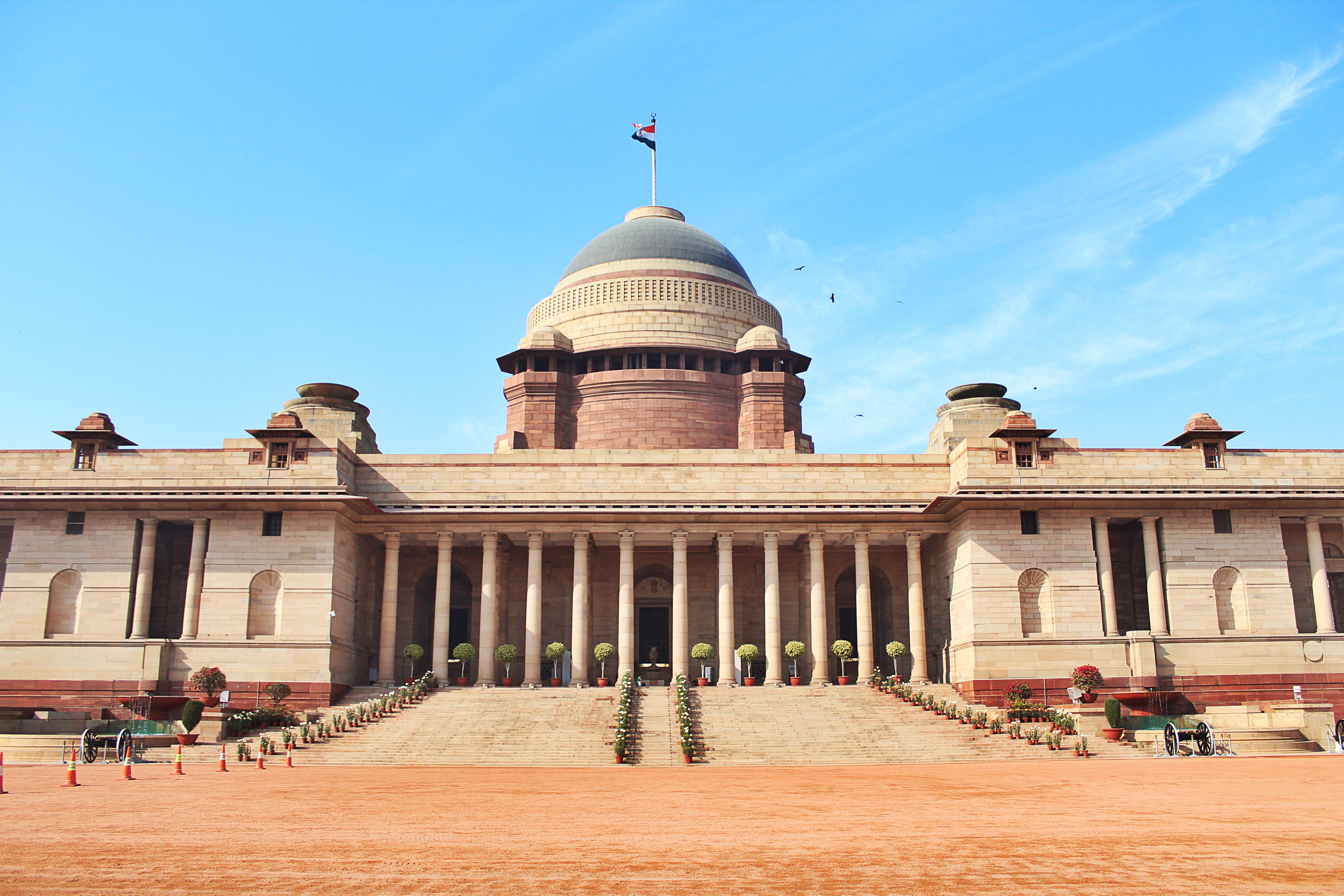
Rashtrapati Bhavan is the presidential palace.

- Samvidhan Sadan or the Parliament of India is a circular building designed by the British architects Sir Edwin Lutyens and Sir Herbert Baker in 1912–1913. Construction began in 1921, and in 1927 the building was opened as the home of the Council of State, the Central Legislative Assembly, and the Chamber of Princes.
- Rashtrapati Bhavan was built with a mix of European and Mughal/Indian styles. It was originally built for the Governor General of India. Inaugurated in 1931 as the Viceregal Lodge, the name was changed in 1959 after India became a republic. It is currently the presidential palace of India.

== Connaught Place ==
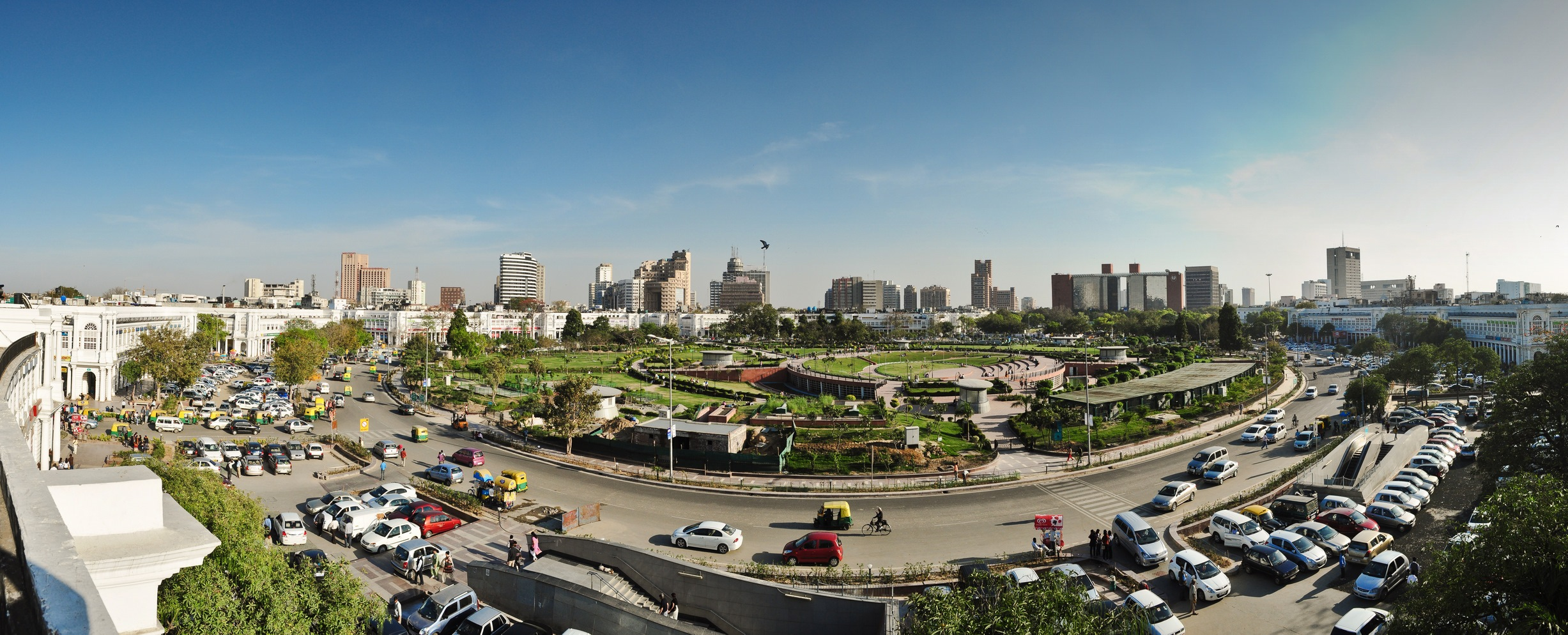
Panoramic view of Connaught Place with central park

Connaught Place, also known as CP, is a business and commercial centre with hotels, shopping complexes, and offices. Tourist attractions include Hanuman Mandir, an ancient temple with a mention in Guinness Book of Record, Jantar Mantar, an astronomical observatory from the 18th century, Maharaja Agrasen ki Baoli and State Emporiums which houses a collection of ethnic specialities of the states.

Connaught Place is divided into two circles, called the inner and outer Connaught circle. Janpath, an open-air shopping complex, lies on the road connecting the inner and outer circle with Palika Bazaar, a landmark market in the underground maze below Connaught Place.

== Historic sites ==
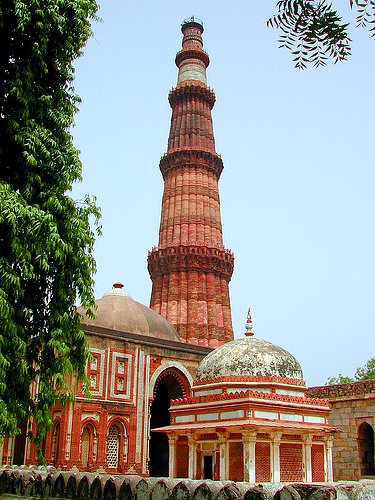
At 72.5 meters, the 13th century Qutub Minar is the world's tallest brick minaret.

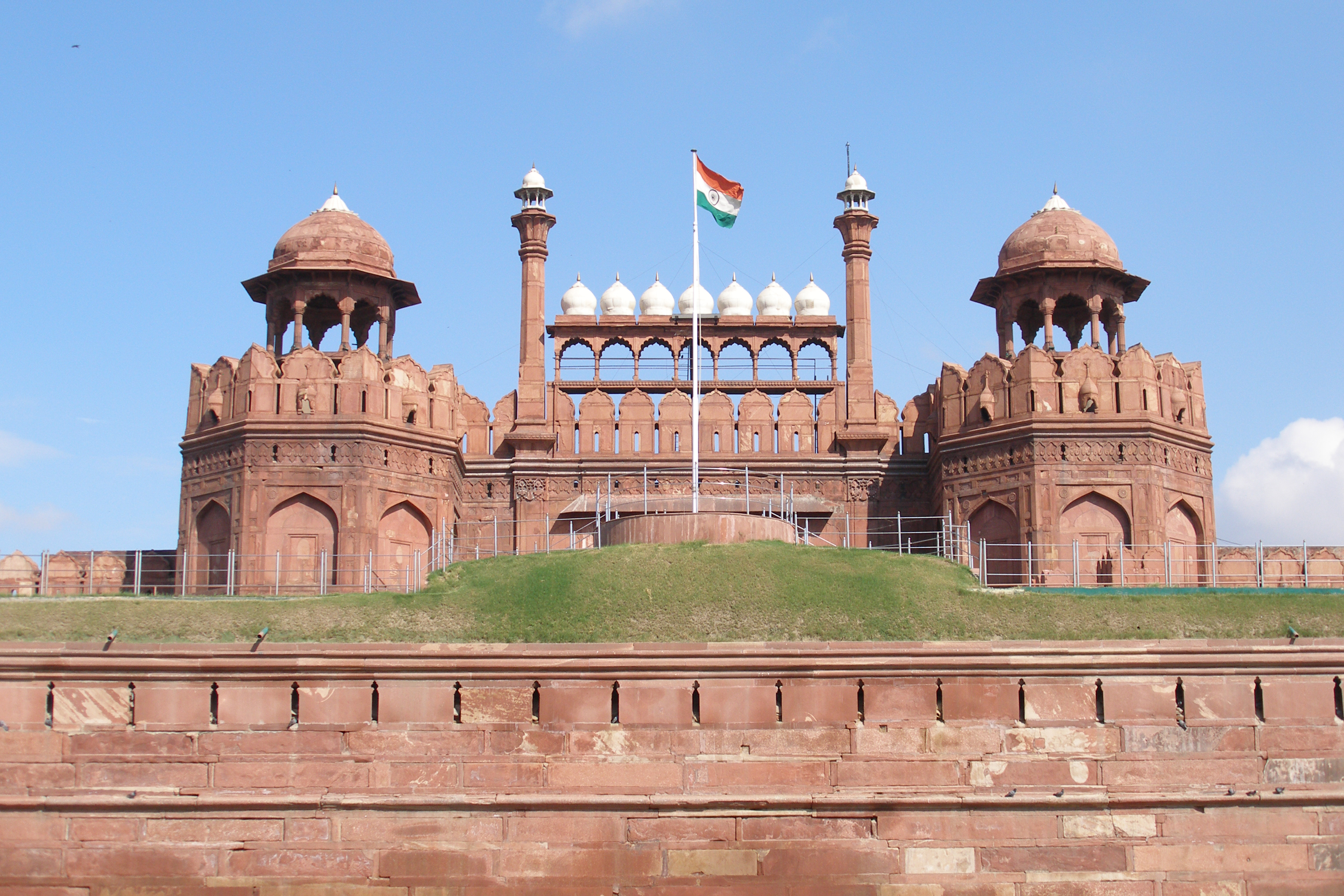
Red Fort is the site from which the Prime Minister of India addresses the nation on Independence Day.

- The Qutub Minar is located in Qutb complex, Mehrauli in South Delhi. It was built by Qutub-ud-din Aibak of the Slave Dynasty, founder of the Delhi Sultanate, started construction of the Qutub Minar's first storey around 1192. In 1220, Aibak's successor and son-in-law Iltutmish completed a further three storeys. In 1369, a lightning strike destroyed the top storey. Firoz Shah Tughlaq replaced the damaged storey and added one more. It is a fluted red sandstone tower, which tapers up to a height of 72.5 meters and is covered with intricate carvings and verses from the Quran.
- Lodi Gardens, earlier called Lady Willingdon Park, is a 15th- and 16th-century park with numerous monuments scattered among its lawns, flowers, shady trees and ponds. Notable monuments are the Tomb of Sikandar Lodi, Bara Gumbad and Shisha Gumbad.
- When Ghiyasuddin Tuglaq founded the Tughlaq Dynasty in 1321. He built the strongest fort in Delhi at Tughlaqabad, completed with great speed within four years of his rule.
- Salimgarh Fort, which is now part of the Red Fort complex, was constructed on an island of the Yamuna River in 1546 by the Suri Dynasty.
- The Purana Quila (Old Fort) is a good example of Mughal military architecture. Built by Pandavas, renovated by Humayun, with later modifications by Sher Shah Suri, the Purana Quila is a monument that is different from the well-planned, carefully decorated, and palatial forts of the later Mughal rulers. It does not have a complex of palaces, administrative, and recreational buildings as is generally found in the forts built later but rather has plain design and sturdy strong walls that were meant to defend it from attacks.
- Chandni Chowk, a main marketplace in Delhi, keeps alive the city's living legacy of Shahjahanabad. It is a very famous place in Delhi it is famous for its Jalebi and Parathas. Chandni Chowk remains Asia's largest wholesale market. Created by Shah Jahan, legend has it that Shah Jahan planned Chandni Chowk so that his daughter could shop for all that she wanted. Handicrafts once patronized by the Mughals continue to flourish there.
- Safdarjung's Tomb is the garden tomb of Safdar Jang, located in a marble mausoleum.
- Humayun's tomb is the tomb of the Mughal emperor Humayun that was commissioned by Humayun's wife and chief consort, Empress Bega Begum in 1569. It is a UNESCO World Heritage Site.
- Red Fort is a historic fort in Delhi where every year on the Independence day of India (15 August), the Prime Minister hoists the Indian tricolour flag at the main gate of the fort and delivers a nationally broadcast speech from its ramparts.
- The Jantar Mantar consists of 13 architectural astronomy instruments, built by Maharaja Jai Singh II.
- The Siri Fort is a historic fort located between Mehrauli and Hauz Khas, and was built during the rule of Alauddin Khilji.
- The Iron pillar of Delhi, a historic structure constructed by Chandragupta II in the 5th century BC, is located in the Qutb complex.

== Places of worship ==
=== Hinduism ===
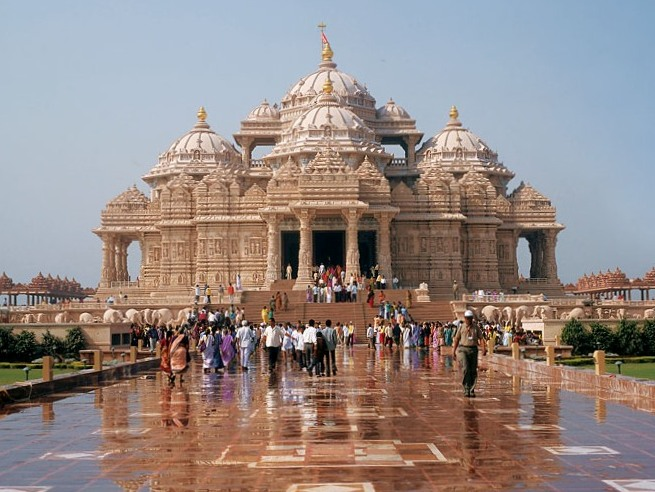
Akshardham Temple, Delhi

- Akshardham Temple it is the third largest Hindu temple in the world. It was built in 2005. In the sprawling 100-acre (0.40 km^{2}) land rests an intricately carved monument, high-technology exhibitions, a musical fountain, a food court and gardens.
- The Laxminarayan Temple was built in honour of Lakshmi (Hindu goddess of wealth), and her consort Narayana (Vishnu, Preserver in the Trimurti) by B. R. Birla from 1933 and 1939, when it was inaugurated by Mahatma Gandhi. The side temples are dedicated to Shiva, Krishna and Buddha. The temple spread over 7.5 acres, is adorned with many shrines, fountains, and a large garden, and also houses Geeta Bhawan for discourses. The temple is one of the major attractions of Delhi and attracts thousands of devotees on the Hindu festivals of Janmashtami and Holi.
- ISKCON Temple also popularly called as the Hare Krishna temple is a famous Vaishnava temple with deities of Sri Radha Krishna. Located in South Delhi, the construction of the temple began in 1991 and was completed in 1998 under the planning of internationally renowned architect Achyut Kanvinde.
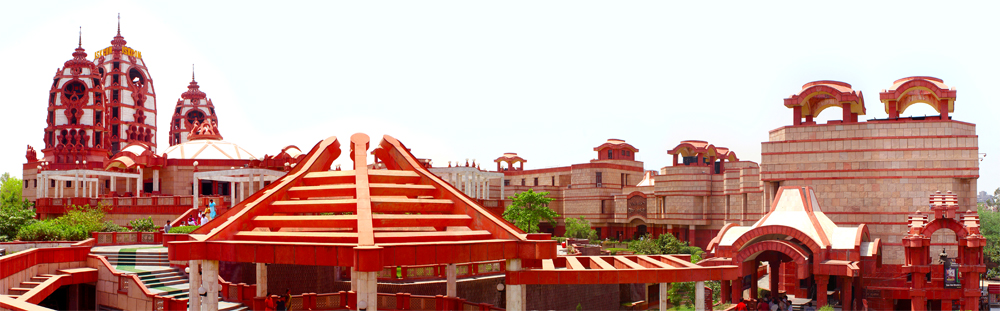
  Panoramic view of ISKCON Temple
  The temple primarily built with red stone is recognized for its unique architecture which blends the traditional Vedic with contemporary style. The complex also houses a one of a kind in the country Robtic show which explains the message of Bhagavad Gita. Another highlight of the temple is beautifully drawn paintings of the Lord done by the foreign devotees. Apart from these, the temple acts as a sturdy base for those wish to study the Vedic scriptures, Yoga and provides a facility for practising Bhakti Yoga as given by Srila Prabhupada. The temple also serves the devotees pure vegetarian food at its 'Govindas' restaurant. The temple is easy to approach as it well connected by buses and Metro trains. .
- Chhatarpur Temple is located at Chhatarpur, is the second-largest temple complex in India, and is dedicated to Goddess, Katyayani
- Kalka Ji Mandir is a famous Hindu mandir or temple, This temple is situated on Kalkaji Mandir (Delhi Metro station) in the southern part of Delhi, India, in Kalkaji, a locality that has derived its name from this famous temple and is located opposite Nehru Place business centre.

=== Jainism ===
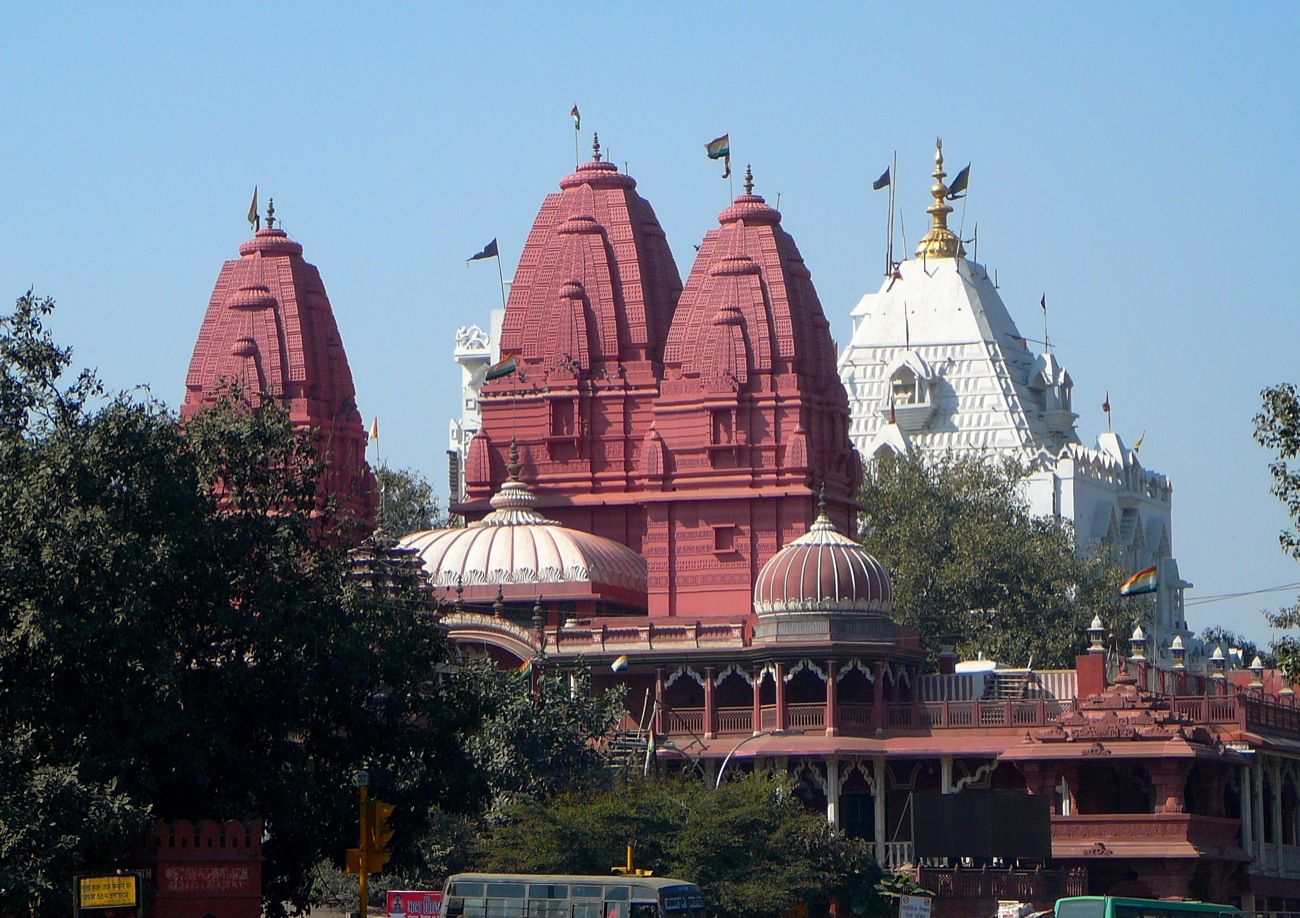
Shri Digambar Jain Lal Mandir

- Shri Digambar Jain Lal Mandir is the oldest and best-known Jain temple in Delhi originally built in 1658. This temple is located just opposite the massive Red Fort at the intersection of Netaji Subhas Marg and Chandni Chowk. The temple is an impressive structure made up red stone giving the name Lal Mandir. The temple is known for an avian veterinary hospital, called the Jain Birds Hospital, in a second building behind the main temple.
- Shri Atma Vallabh Jain Smarak is a Jain temple and a multi-faceted memorial in the sacred memory of Jain Acharya Shri Vijay Vallabh Surishwer Ji. The main hall of the temple is considered a brilliant example of the structural design as per ancient Jain Sthapatya Kala (Main Sompura: Amrutbhai Mulshankar Trivedi). It is built in dome-shaped internally with stepped roof exterior.

=== Sikhs ===
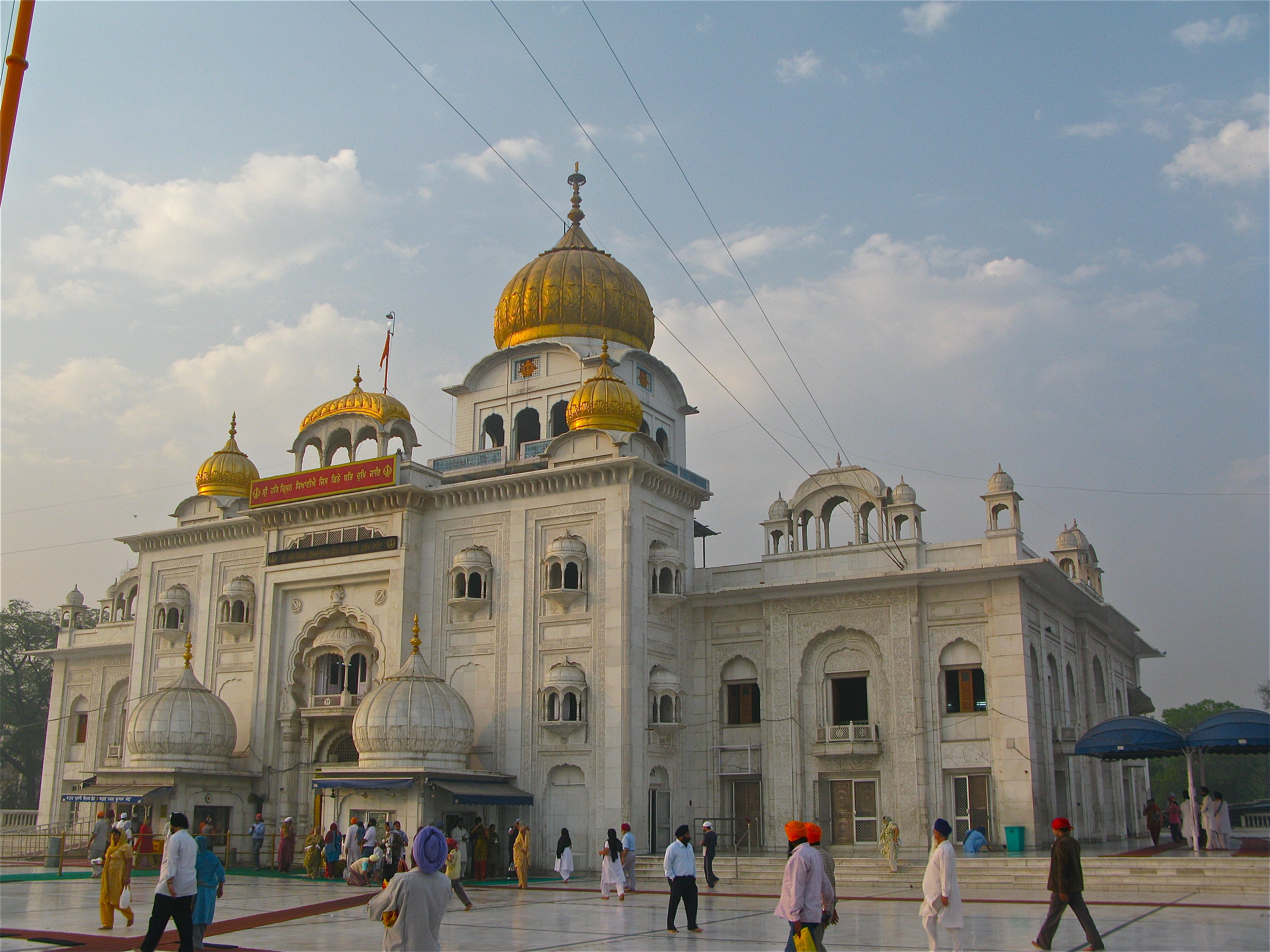
Gurdwara Bangla Sahib

- Gurdwara Bangla Sahib is one of the most prominent and largest gurdwaras in Delhi. Gurdwara Bangla Sahib is the most visited one in Delhi. Millions visit from all over the world and of all religions to offer their prayers at this elegant yet historical gurdwara in Delhi. The gurdwara marks the place where the eighth Sikh Guru, Guru Harkrishan, lived his last breath serving the population ravaged by the smallpox and cholera epidemic. The Gurdwara offers free food (langar) to all visitors and devotees throughout the day. Even one can have its M.R.I. free of cost at Bangla Sahib. There is a beautiful reservoir.

=== Islam ===
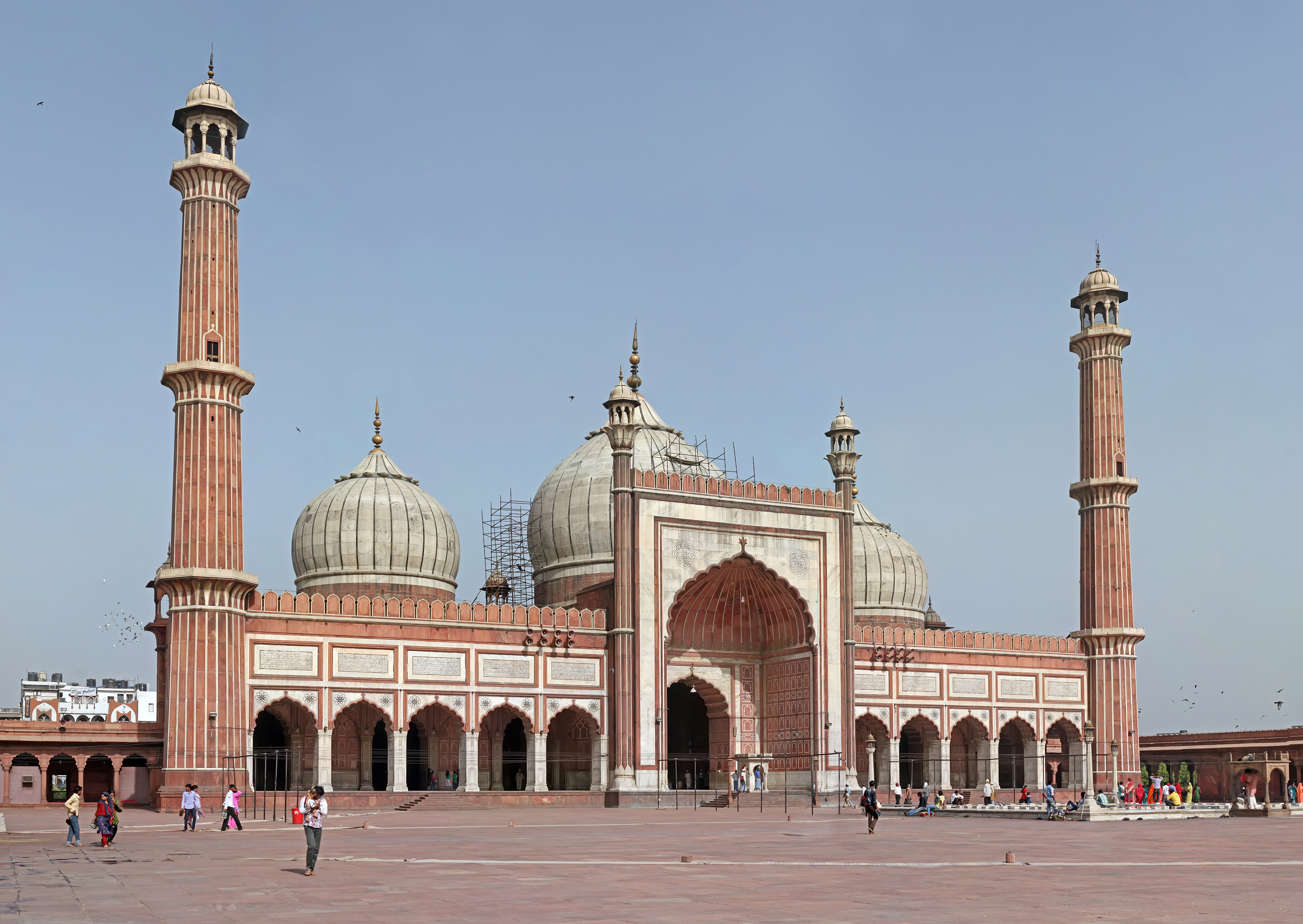
Jama Masjid

- The Masjid-i-Jahan Numa, commonly known as Jama Masjid, is the principal mosque of Old Delhi. Commissioned by the Mughal Emperor Shah Jahan and completed in 1656, it is one of the largest and best-known mosques in India. It can accommodate around 25,000 people at once.
- Nizamuddin Dargah is the Mausoleum of the famous Sufi Saint Nizamuddin Auliya, Delhi.
- Matka Peer Dargah is the Mausoleum of the famous Sufi Saint Sheikh Abu Bakar Tusi, Delhi.

=== Baháʼí ===
- The Lotus Temple, built as a Baháʼí House of Worship, is situated in South Delhi and looks like a white lotus. It was built by the community of the Baháʼí Faith. The temple has received a wide range of attention in professional architectural, fine art, religious, governmental, and other venues.

=== Christian ===
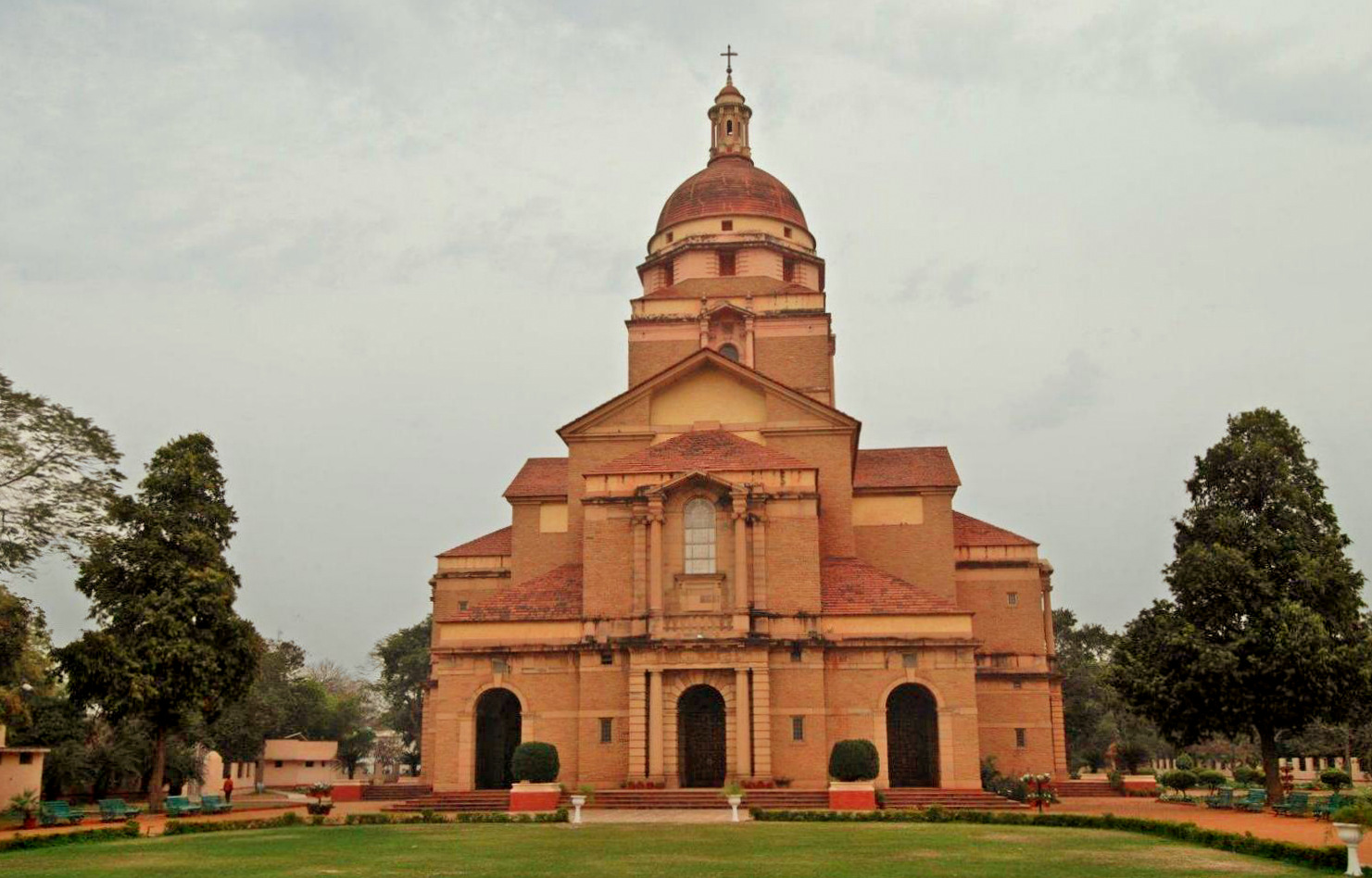
Cathedral Church of Redemption

- Cathedral Church of Redemption, also known as Viceroy Church. Located east of Parliament House and Rashtrapati Bhavan, which was used by then viceroy of British India. The Church derives its name from Palladio's Church of Il Redentore in Venice as well as Lutyens St Jude's Church, Hampstead Garden Suburb. The cathedral was built in eight years and was completed in 1935. Cathedral was designed by Henry Medd. The cathedral was built in such a manner that even in the extreme summers it remains cool and serene. The church serves locals and foreigners. It is visited by tens of thousands of visitors each day.
- St. James' Church is one of the oldest churches in Delhi.

== Memorials ==
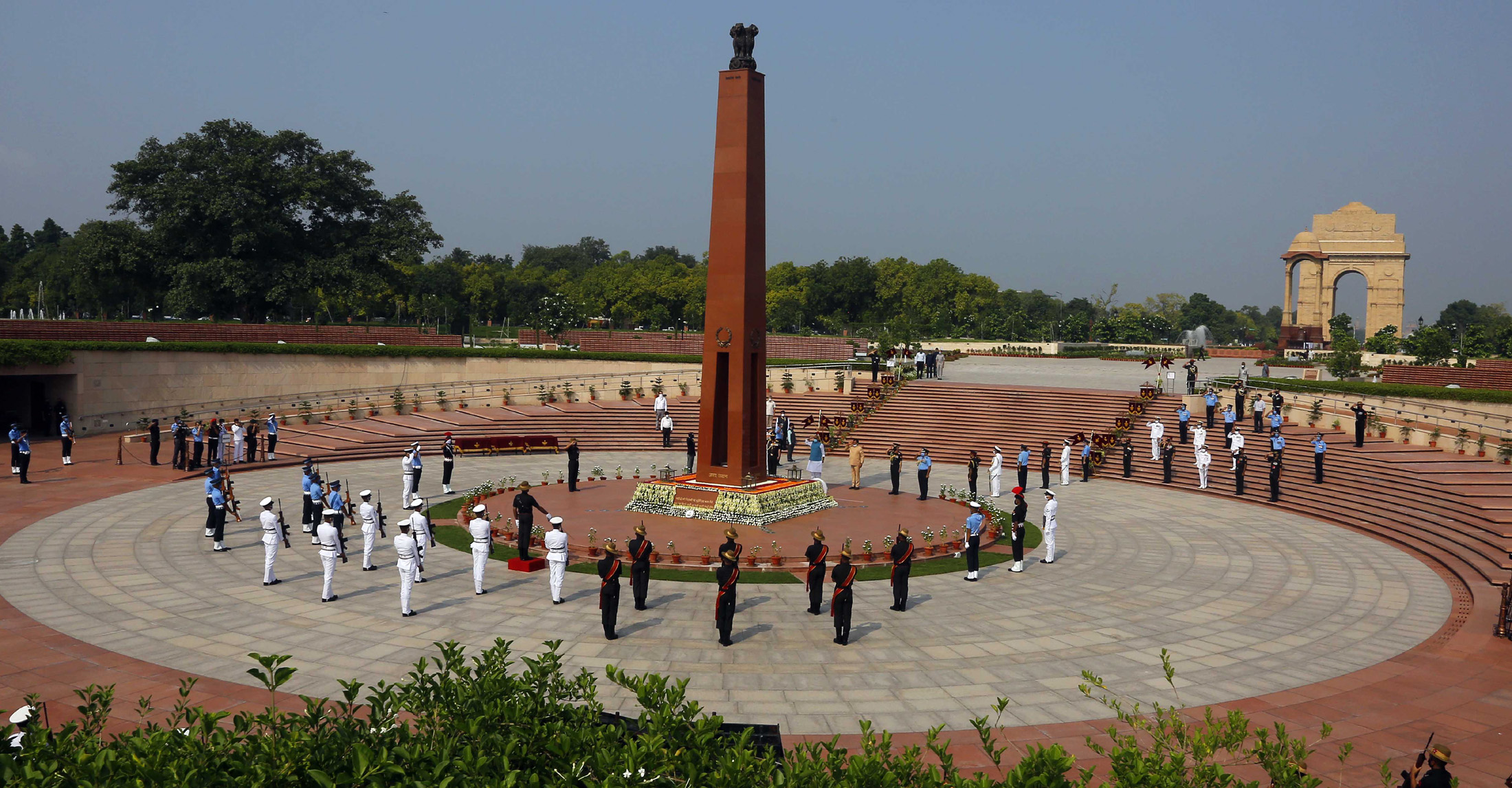
- National War Memorial
  The National War Memorial is a war memorial to India's military.
- The India Gate located astride the Rajpath is a war memorial to 70,000 soldiers of the Indian Army who lost their lives in the First World War.
- The Wall of Truth is a memorial for Sikhs killed during the 1984 anti-Sikh riots and "all Sikhs killed world over in hate crimes".
- The National Police Memorial commemorates police personnel from all of the central and state police forces in India who have died in the line of duty since Independence.
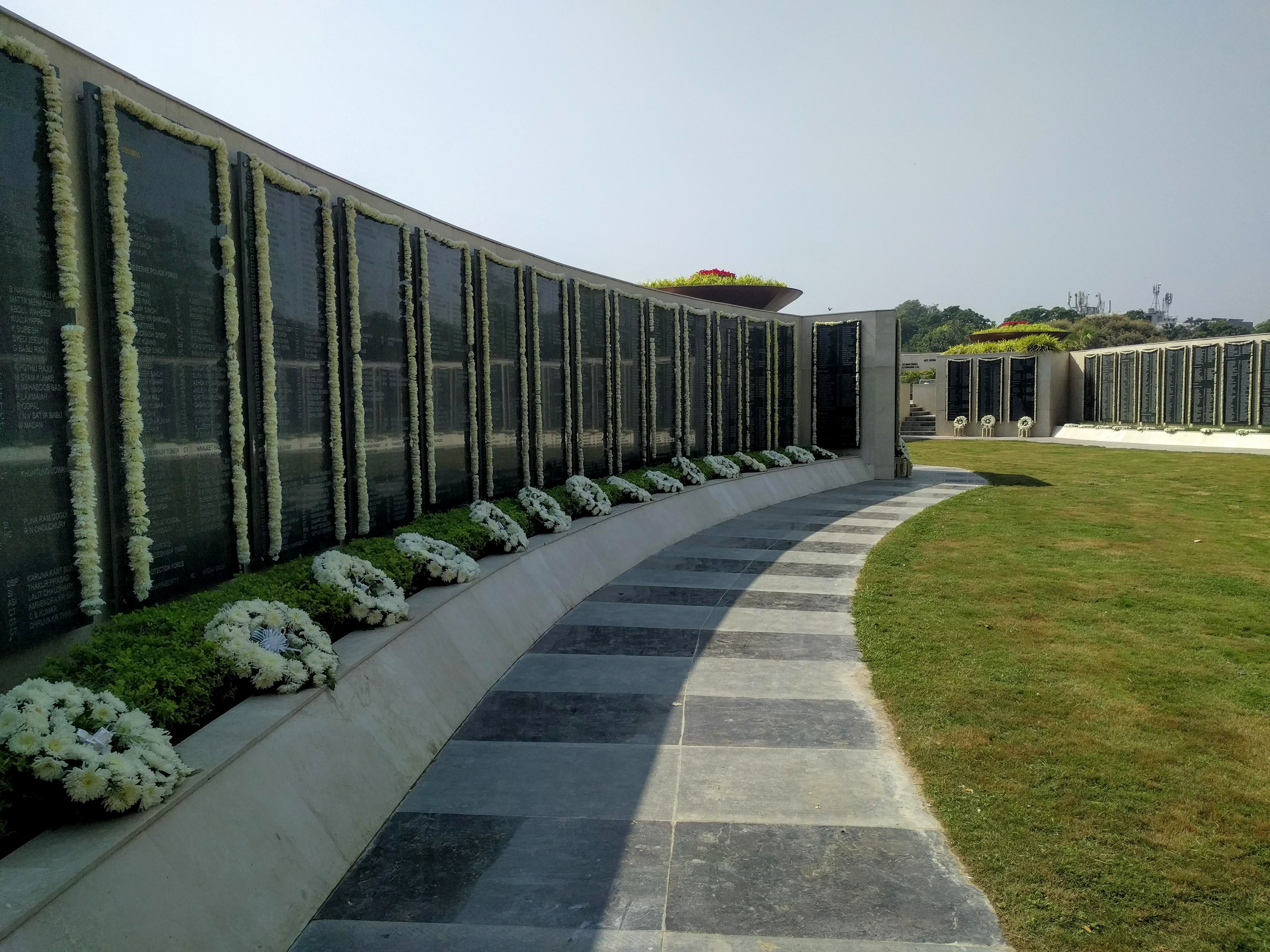
  One section of the Wall of Valour at the National Police Memorial and Museum
- On the banks of the Yamuna River, which flows past Delhi, there is Raj Ghat, the final resting place of Mahatma Gandhi, the father of the nation. It has become an essential point of call for all visiting dignitaries. Two museums dedicated to Gandhi are situated nearby.
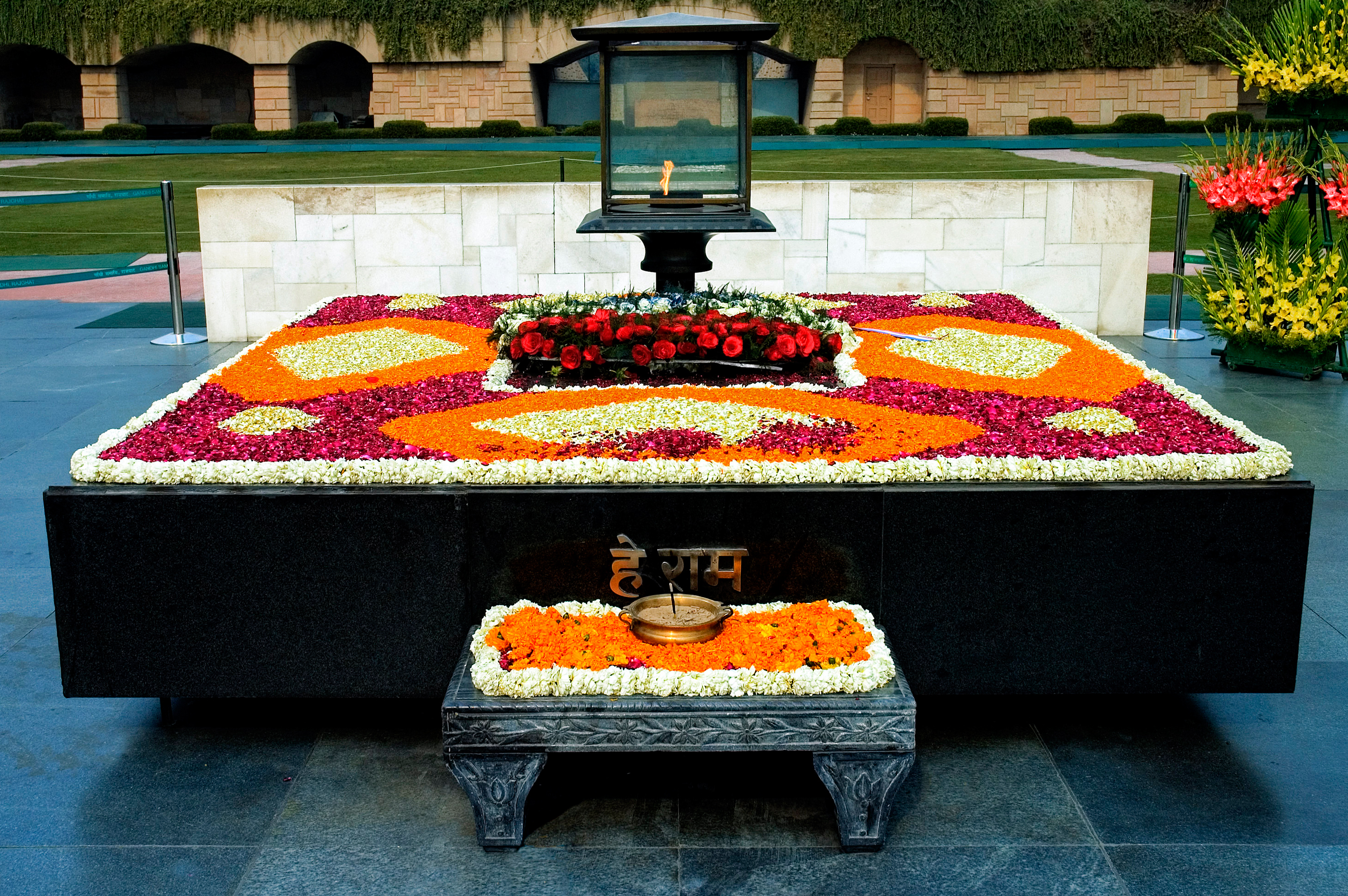
  Raj Ghat, the memorial to Mahatma Gandhi, is a simple black marble platform that marks the spot of his cremation on 31 January 1948.

== Museums ==
- Ghalib Museum
- Indian War Memorial Museum
- Pradhan Mantri Sangrahalaya
- National Museum
- National Rail Museum
- National Museum of Natural History
- National Philatelic Museum, New Delhi
- Indian Air Force Museum, Palam
- National Gallery of Modern Art
- National Gandhi Museum
- National Handicrafts and Handlooms Museum
- National Science Centre, New Delhi
- Kiran Nadar Museum of Art
- Parliament Museum
- Rashtrapati Bhavan Museum
- Red Fort Archaeological Museum
- Shaheedi Park
- Shankar's International Dolls Museum
- Sulabh International Museum of Toilets

== Other attractions ==
- Delhi is a food lover's paradise, from street food to the Paranthe Wali Gali of old Delhi selling everything from paranthas to nihari, to the modern-day but local cafes that have sprung up, to the Mughlai and North Indian restaurants- Delhi food is its heart and soul. And it requires a huge appetite to sample it all.
- Shopping in Delhi has been diverse and popular among shoppers since ancient times.
- Lying close to the Raj Ghat, the Shanti Van (literally, the forest of peace) is the place where India's first Prime Minister Jawaharlal Nehru was cremated. The area is now a beautiful park adorned by trees planted by visiting dignitaries and heads of state.
- Ahinsa Sthal is a Jain temple located in Mehrauli. This temple is famous for its magnificent 13 ft. 6-inch statue of Mahavira carved from single granite rock.
- Rajpath, constructed by Sir Edwin Lutyens, is a road that runs from Rashtrapati Bhavan and is surrounded by beautiful gardens.

== Parks and gardens ==
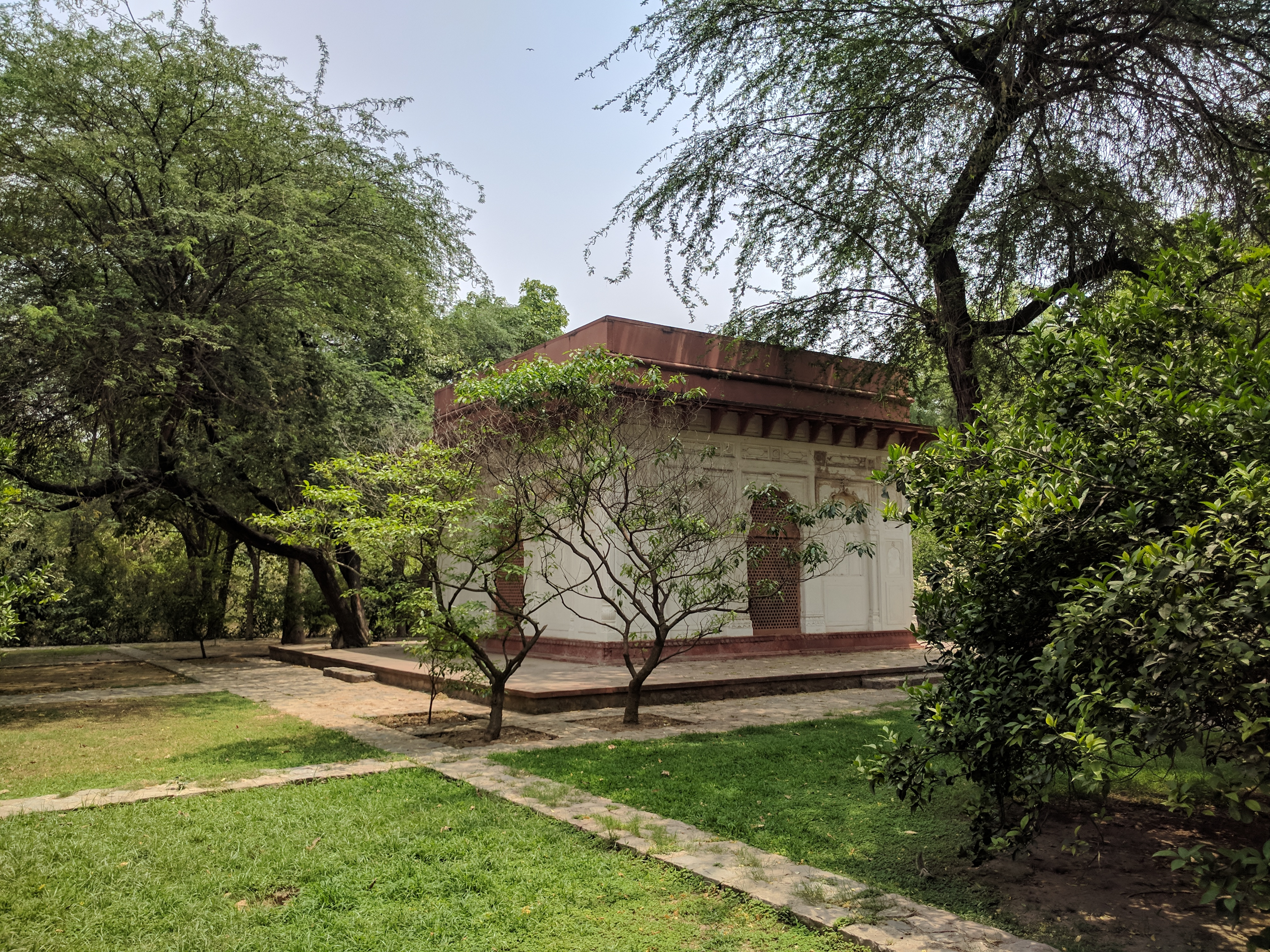
Sunder Nursery

- The Garden of Five Senses is a park with numerous modern art and sculpture pieces spread over 20 acres near Saket in south Delhi.
- Bharat Darshan Park is a park spread over 8.5 acres made out of 350 metric tons of waste. It opened in December 2021. It was developed by the South Delhi Municipal Corporation (SDMC) in West Delhi's Punjabi Bagh at an estimated cost of ₹ 14 crore and replicas of 21 monuments from across the country.
- Aastha Kunj
- The National Zoological Park is a 176-acre (71 ha) zoo near the Old Fort in Delhi, India. The zoo is home to about 1350 animals representing almost 130 species of animals and birds from around the world.
- Millennium Indraprastha Park, located between ITO and Akshardham, is a park with an amphitheatre, food court and a Vishwa Shanti Stupa with Buddha statue.
- Sunder Nursery, a 90 acres heritage park near Humayun's Tomb, is a UNESCO World Heritage Site and has a garden with marble fountains.

== Gallery ==
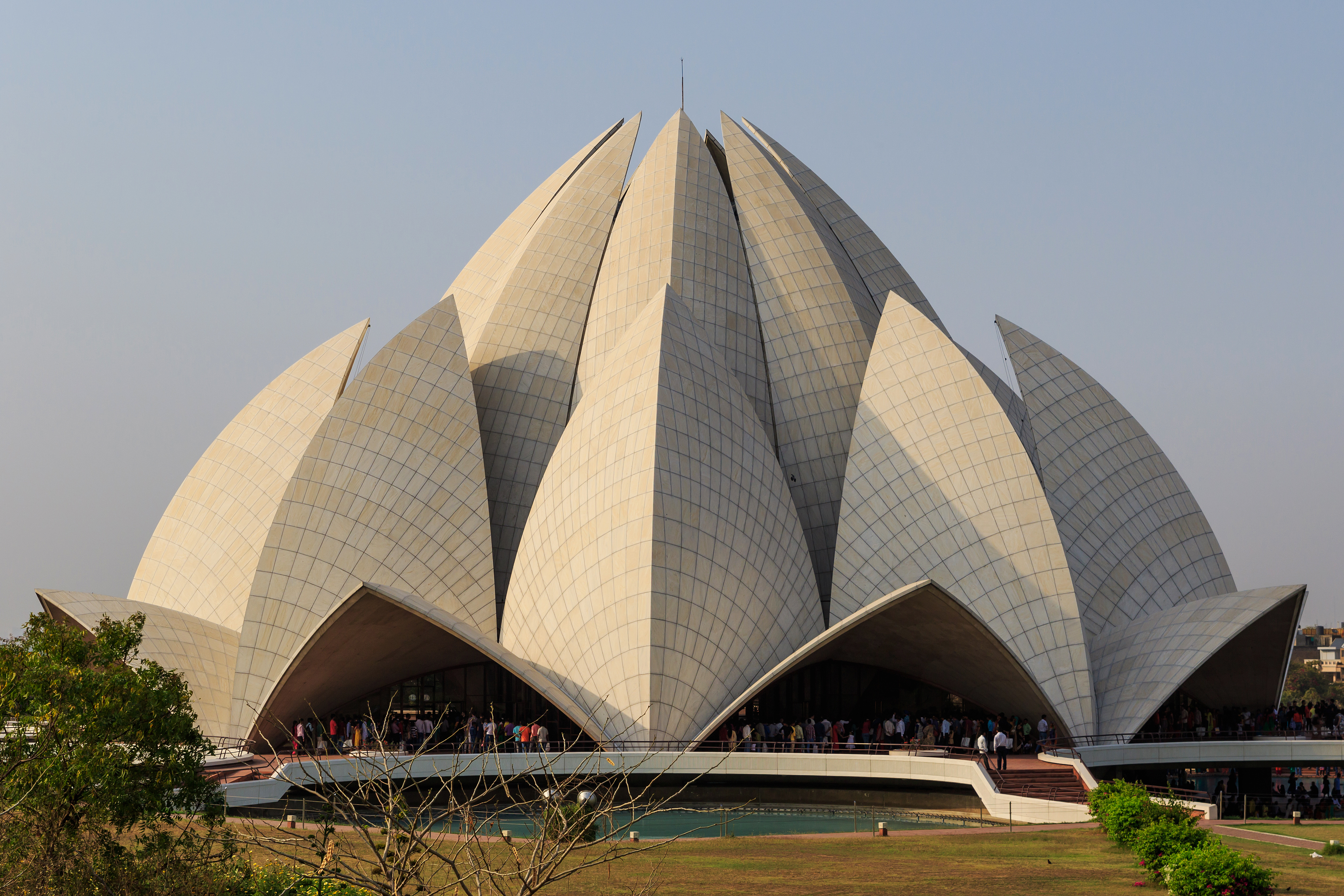
Lotus Temple is a Baháʼí House of Worship and the Mother Temple of the Indian subcontinent.

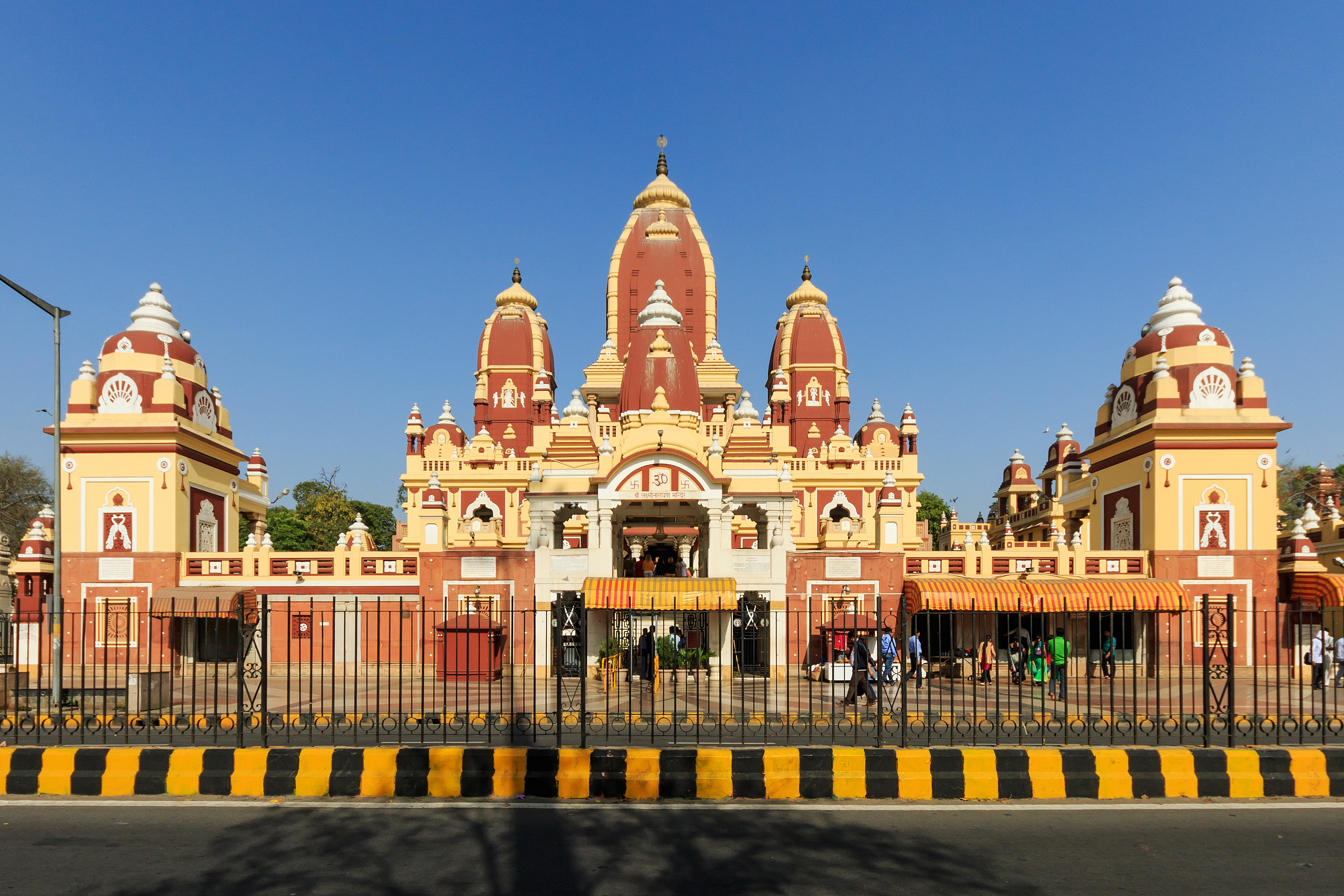
Laxminarayan Temple is one of the most famous Vaishnavite temples in India.

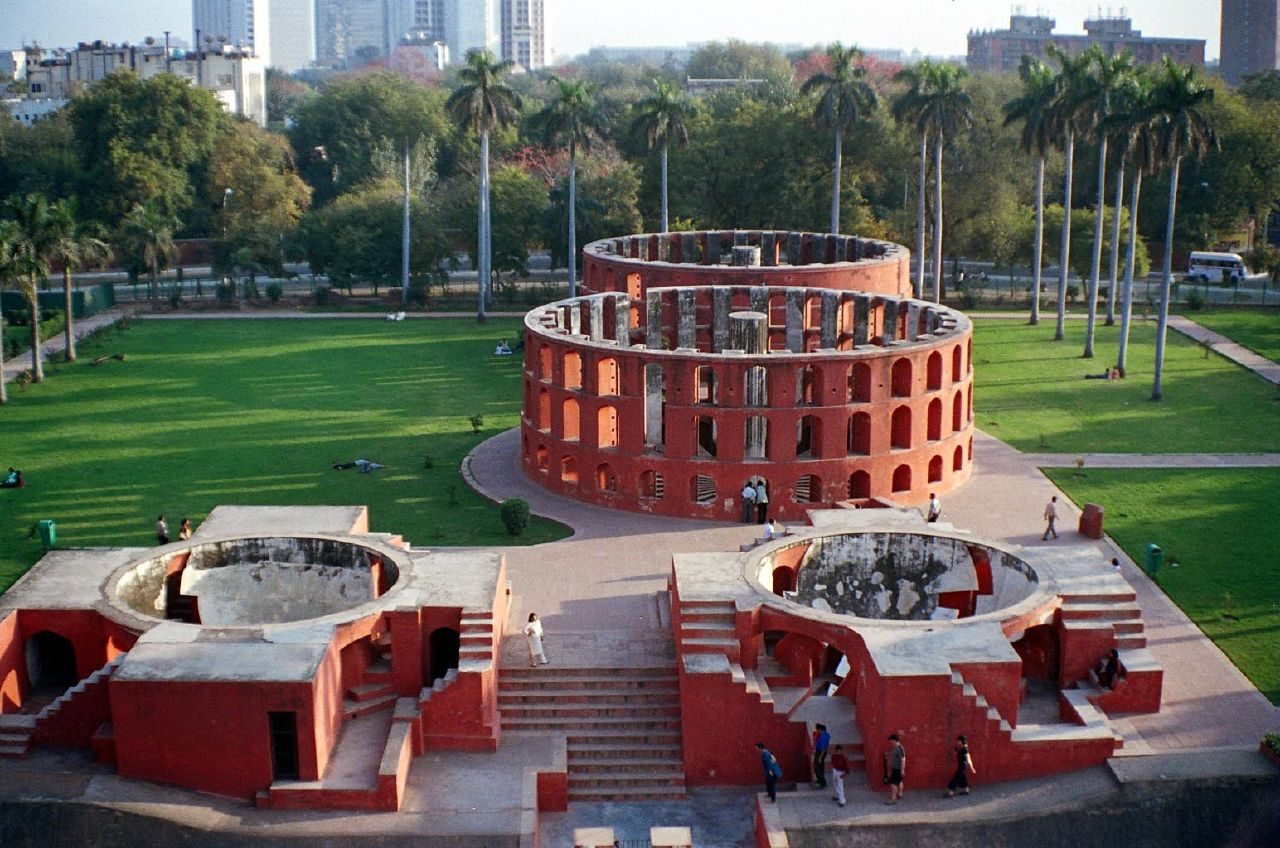
Jantar Mantar consists of 13 architectural astronomy instruments, built by Maharaja Jai Singh II between 1727 and 1734.

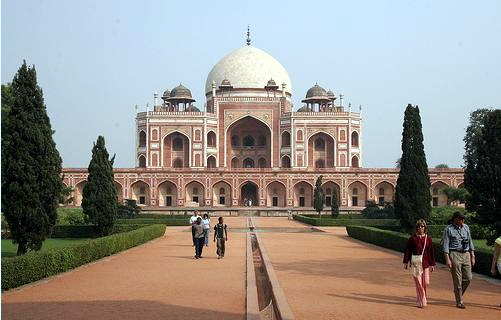
Humayun's Tomb is one of Delhi's most famous landmarks. The monument has an architectural design similar to the Taj Mahal.

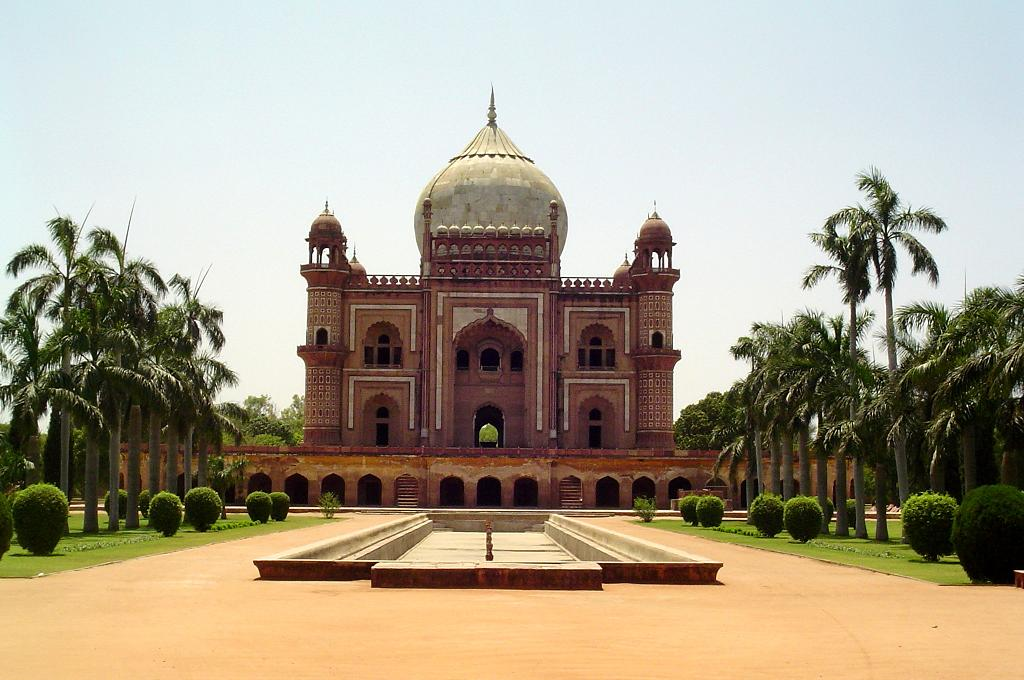
Safdarjung's Tomb is a garden tomb in a marble mausoleum.

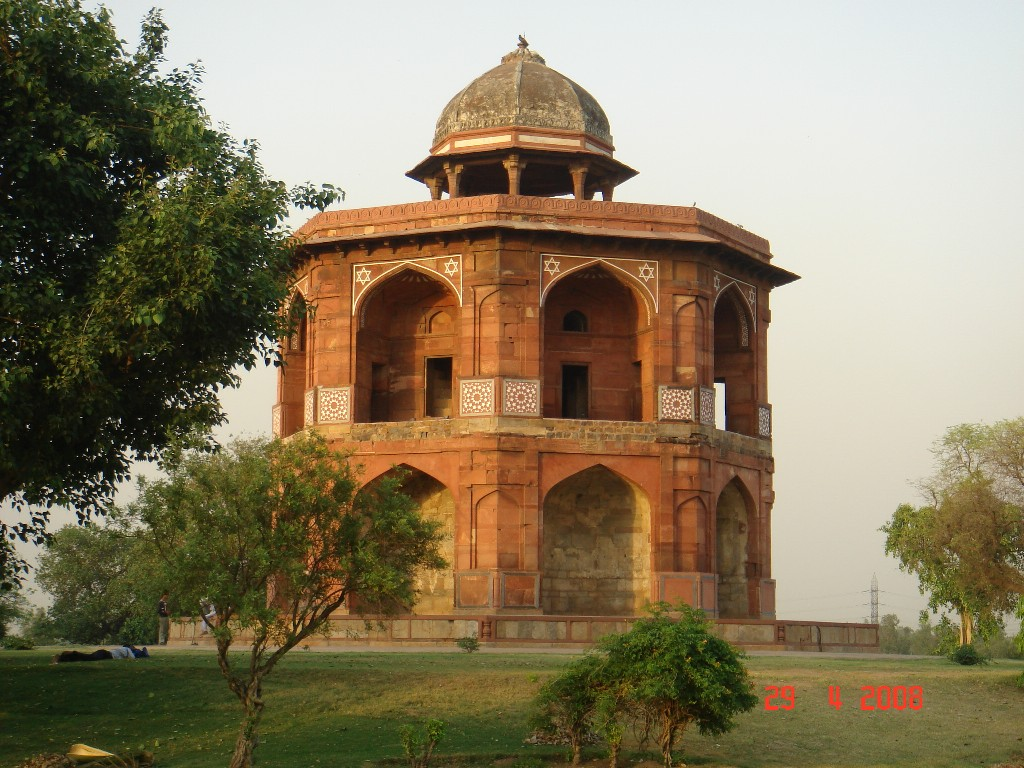
Sher Mandal in Purana Qila stands on an ancient mound. Excavations near its eastern wall reveal that the site has been continuously occupied since 1000 BC.

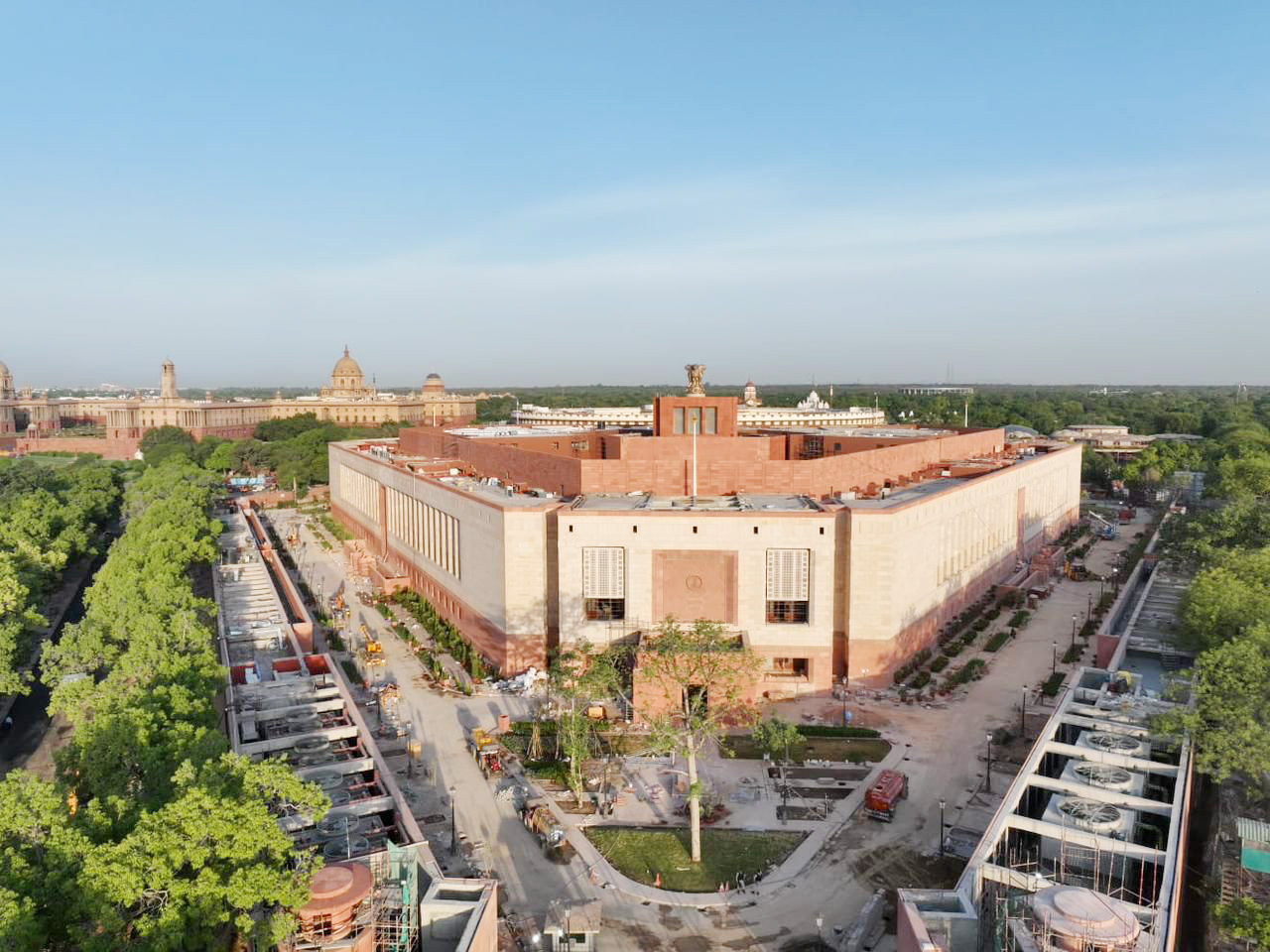
Sansad Bhavan or the Parliament of India

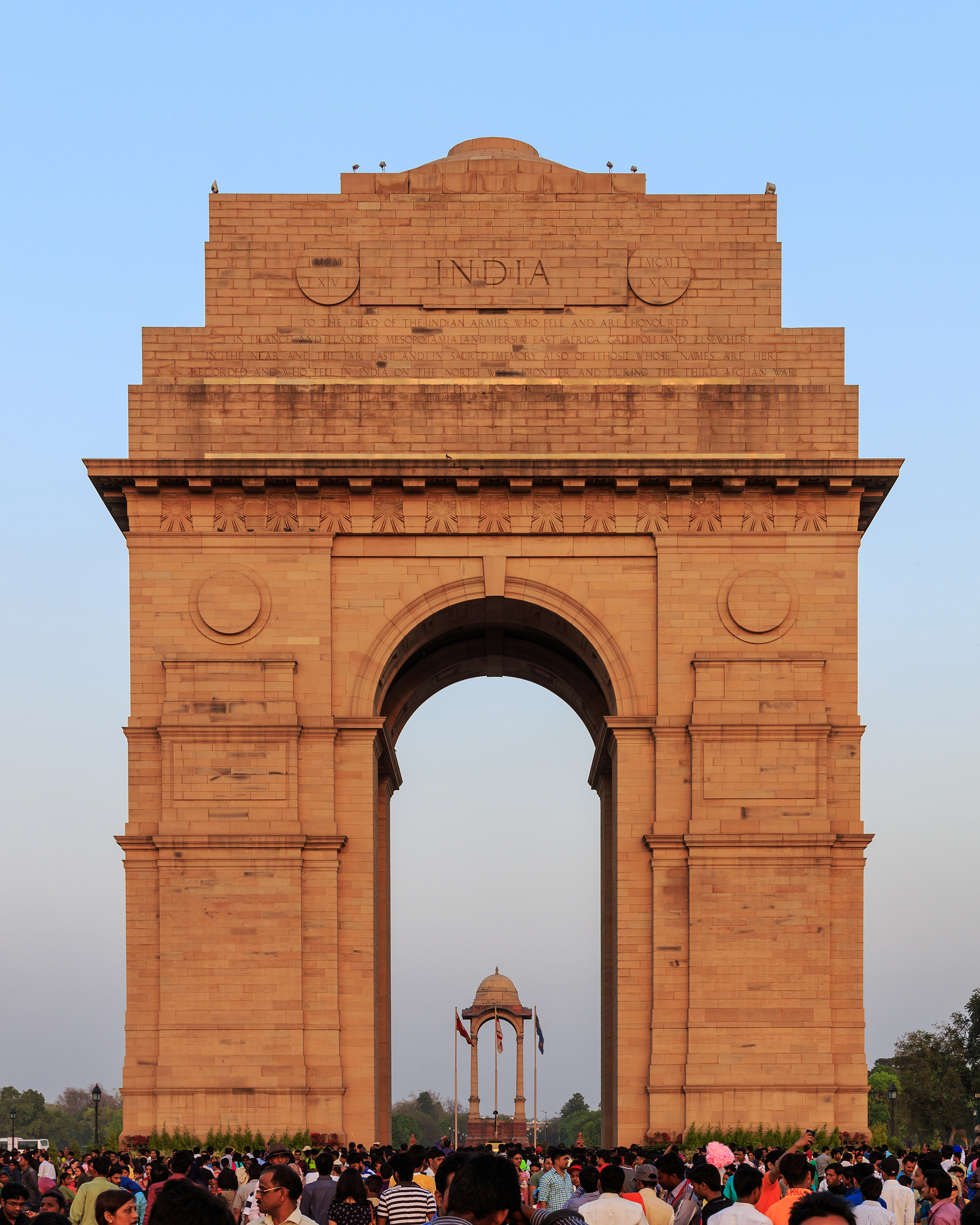
The India Gate is one of the most famous monuments in Delhi. Built-in the memory of more than 90,000 Indian soldiers who died during the Afghan Wars and World War I.

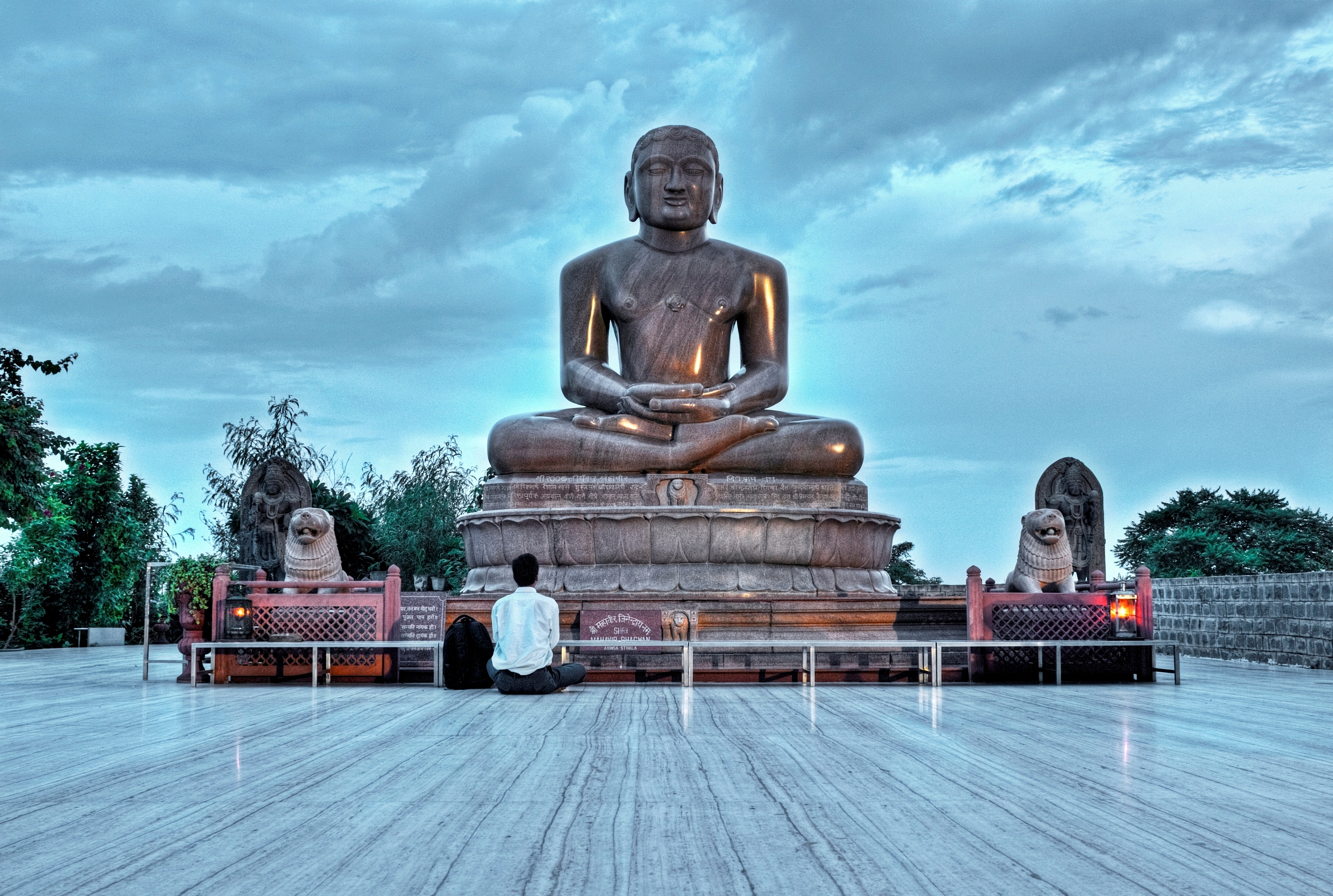
Ahinsa Sthal consists of a 13 ft 6 inches idol of Mahavira, Mehrauli.

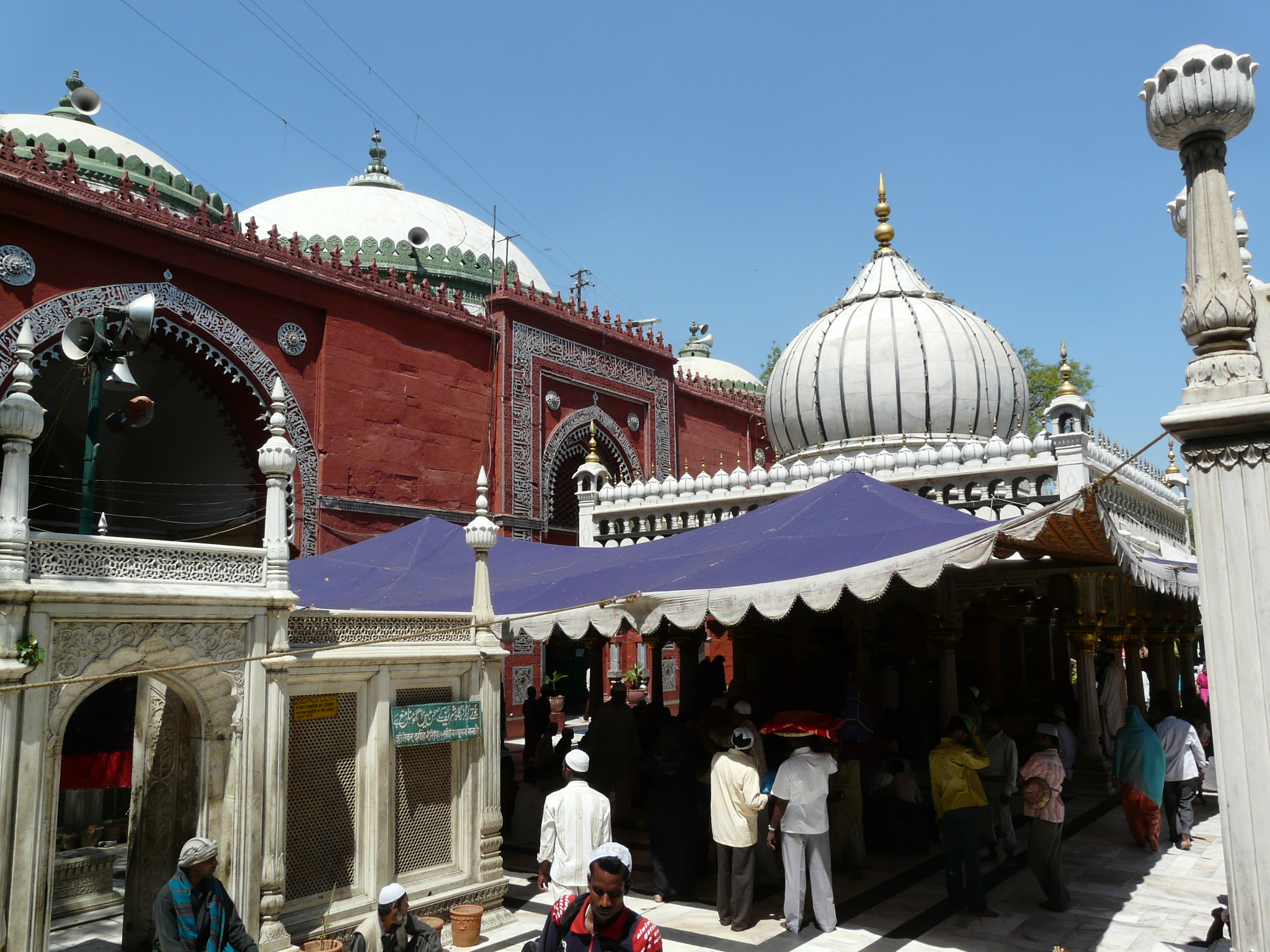
Nizamuddin Dargah and Jamaat Khan Masjid

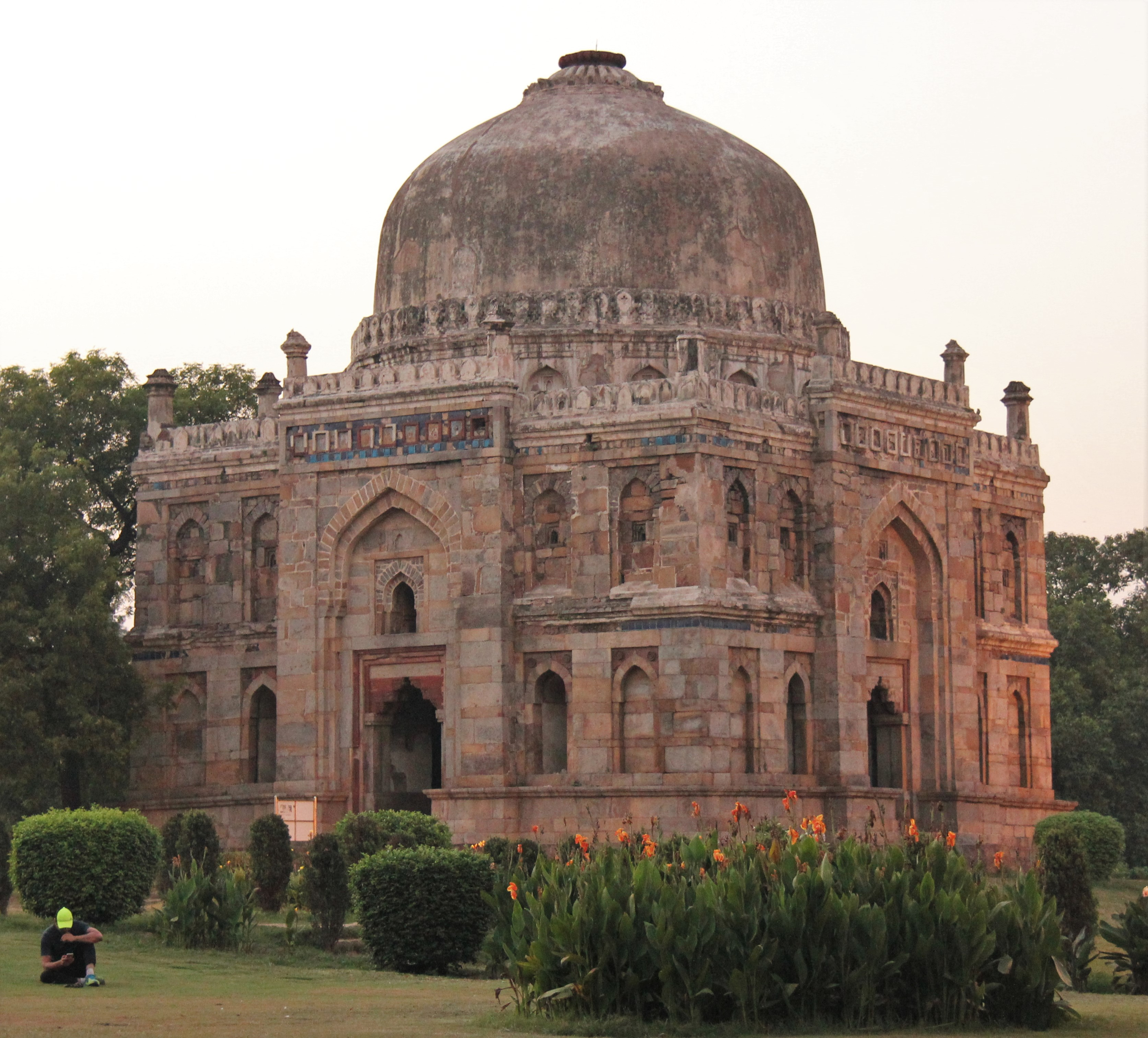
Mausoleum called the Shisha Gumbad (glass dome) for its internal glass decorations at Lodi Gardens

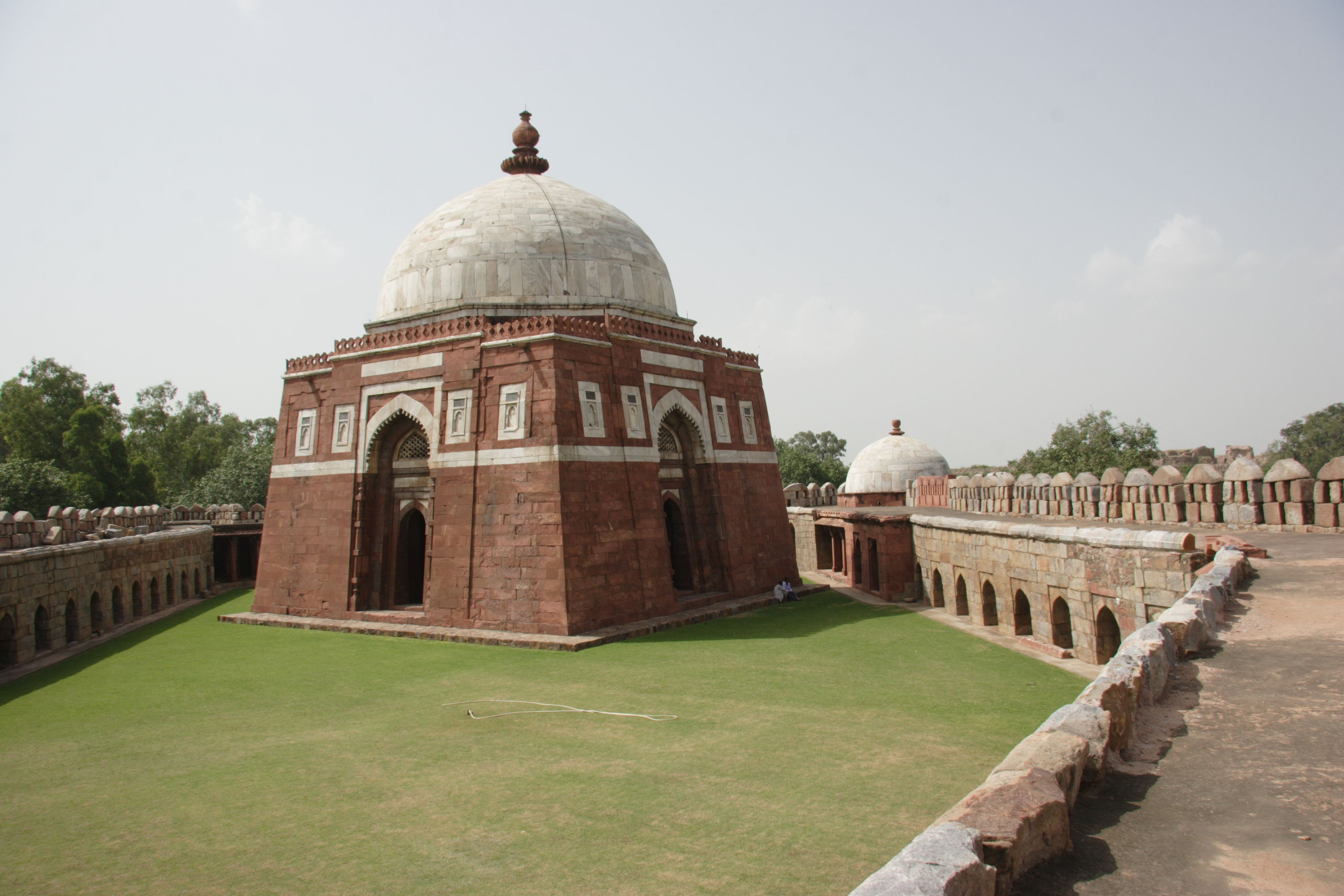
Mausoleum of Ghiyath al-Din Tughluq at Tughlaqabad Fort

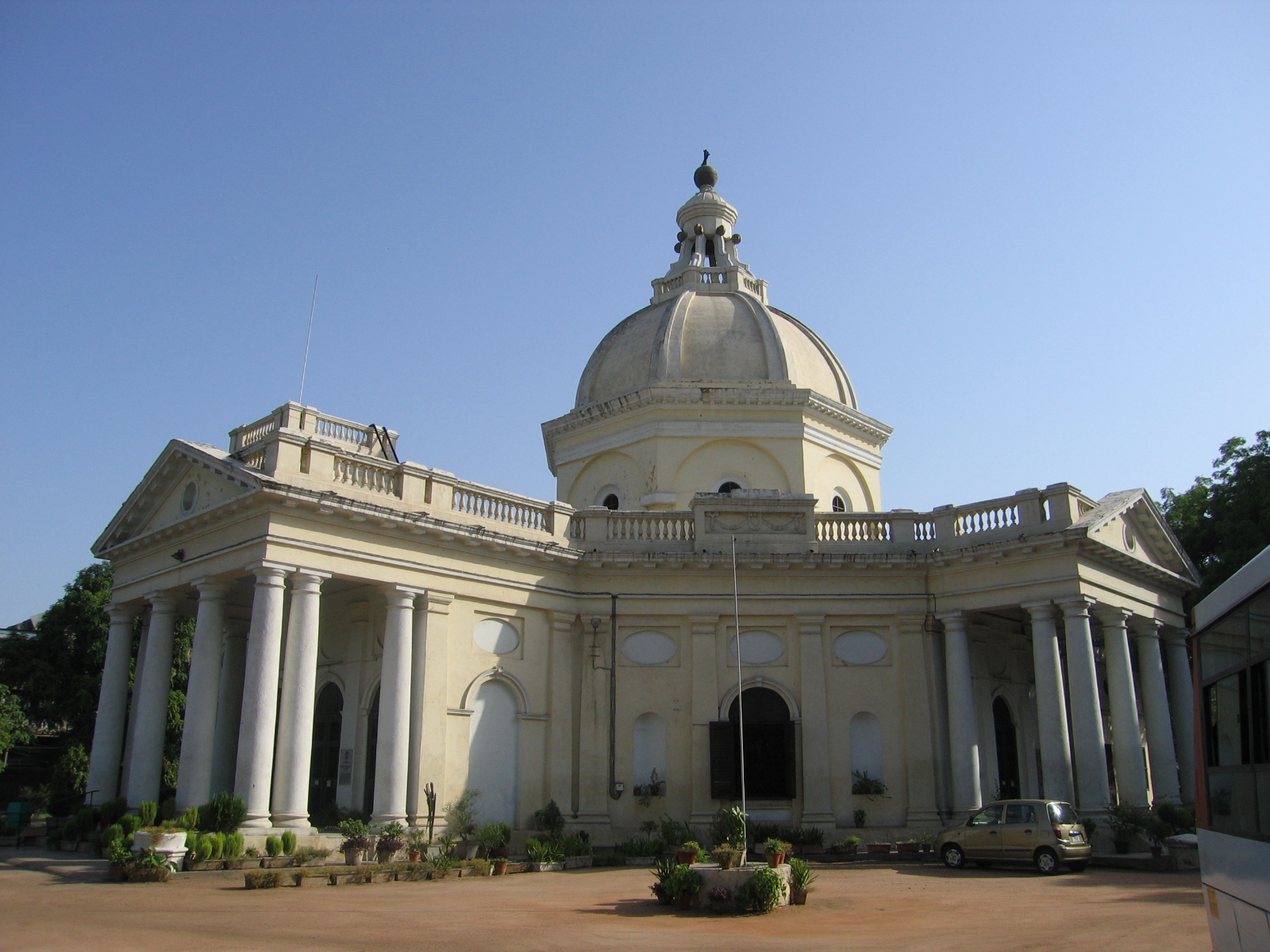
St. James' Church (1836) (Skinner's Church), at Kashmiri Gate, one of the oldest churches of Delhi

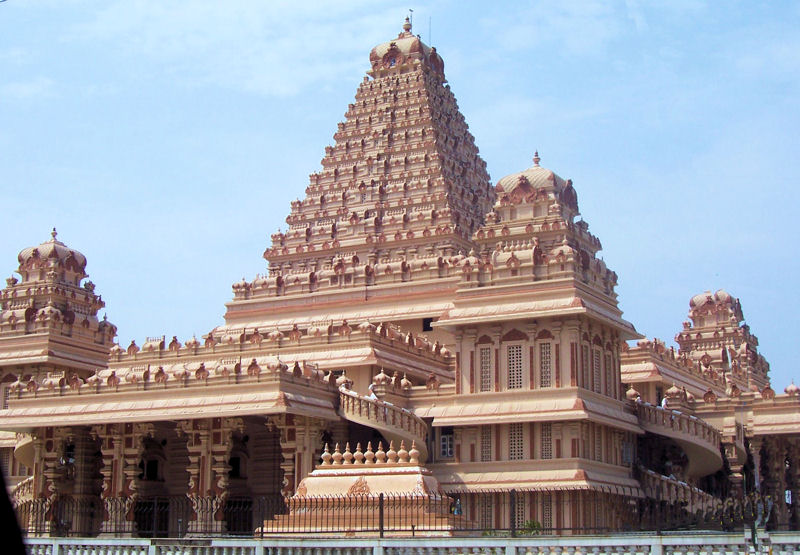
Chhatarpur Temple

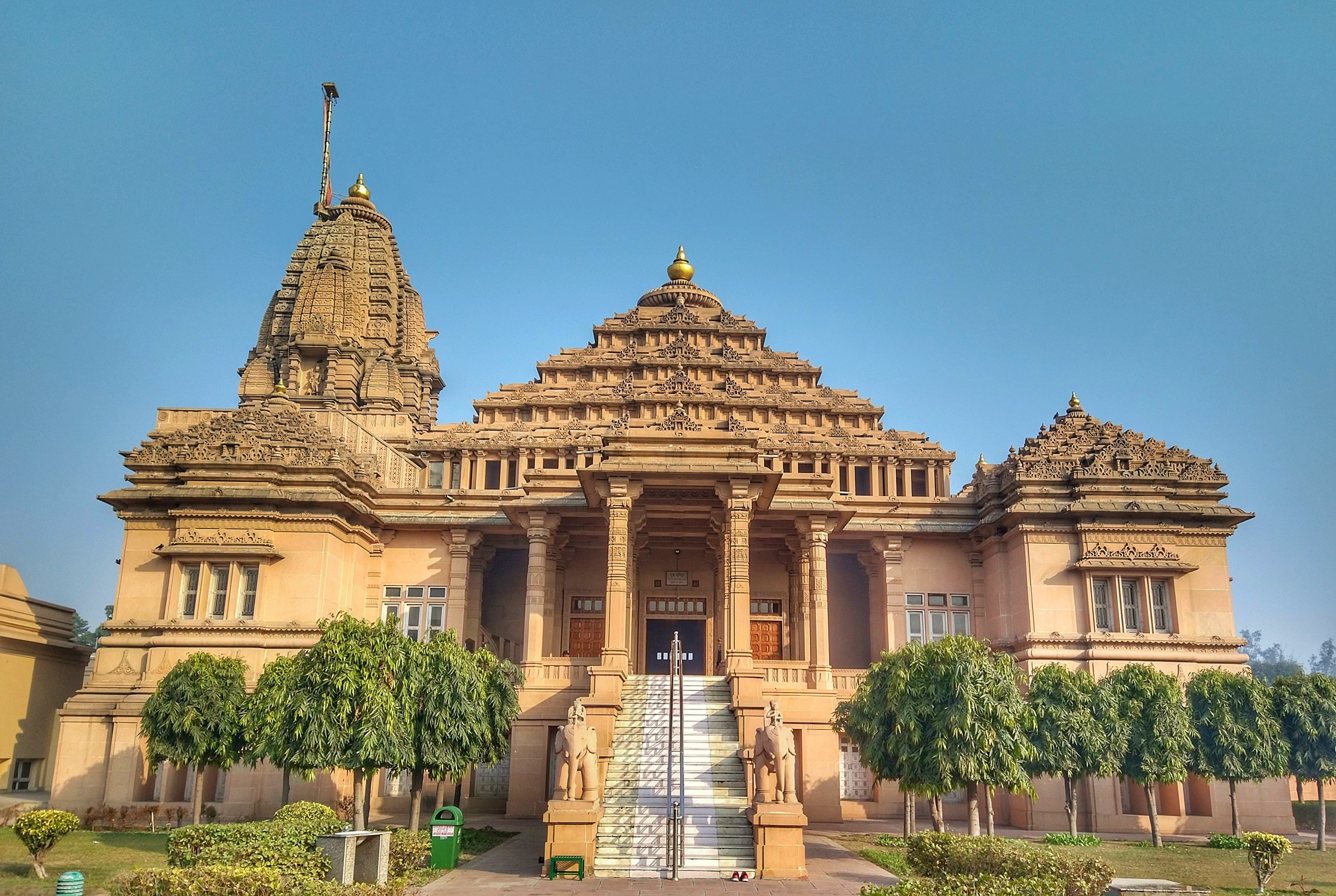
Shri Atma Vallabh Jain Smarak

== See also ==
- Tourism in India
- Outline of tourism in India
