= Aastha Kunj =

Park in New Delhi, India

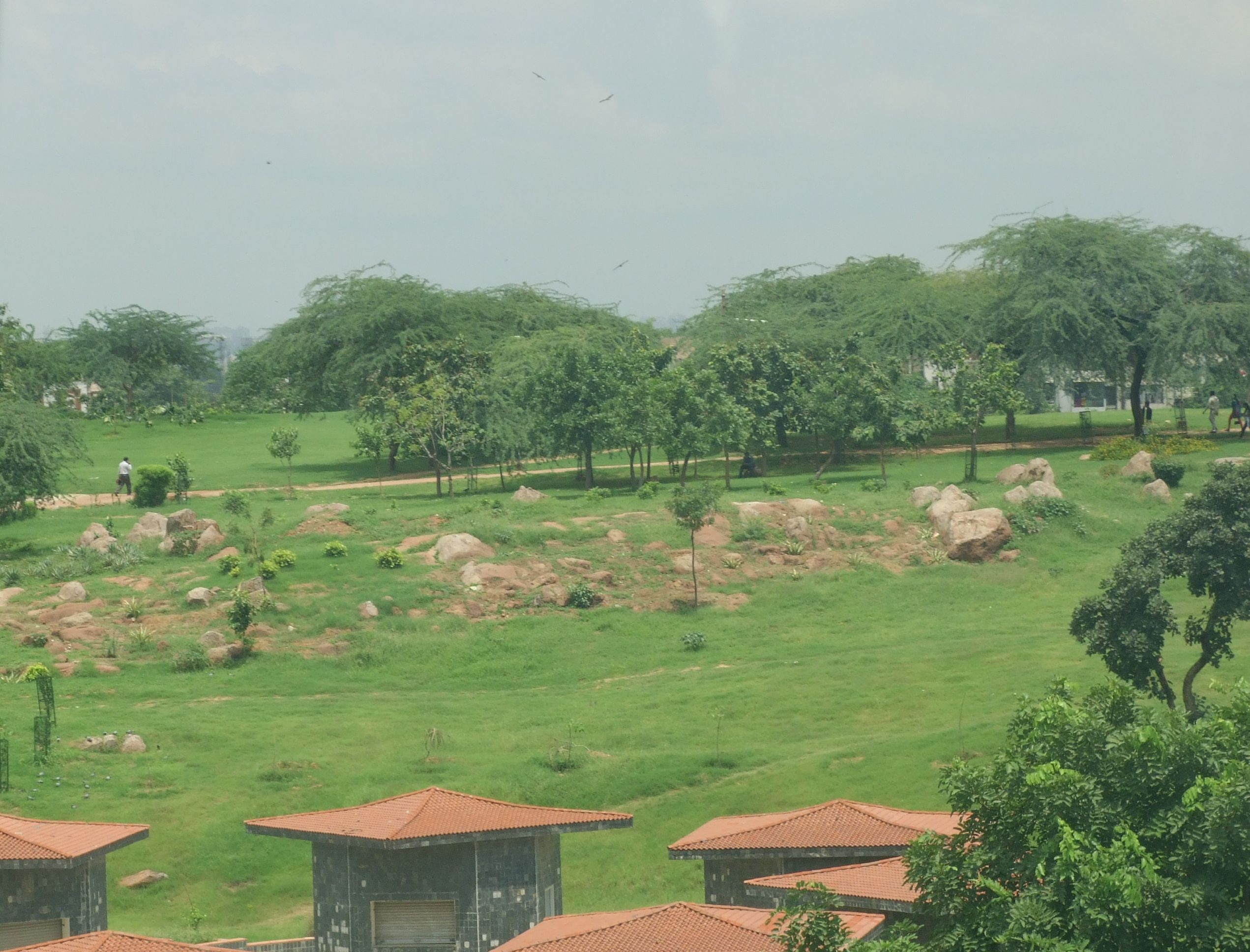
- Aastha Kunj Park
- Interactive map of Aastha Kunj
- Type: Urban park
- Location: Delhi, India
- Coordinates: 28.547222°N 77.250833°E
- Area: 200 acres (81 ha)

Aastha Kunj is a 200-acre park in southeast Delhi, India. It lies between the Lotus Temple, ISKCON Temple, Nehru Place. The nearest metro station to the park is Kalkaji Mandir metro station.

== See also ==
- List of parks in Delhi
