= Shopping in Delhi =

Delhi has been a favoured destination for shoppers throughout its history.

Below is a list of well-known shopping markets and malls in the National Capital Region.

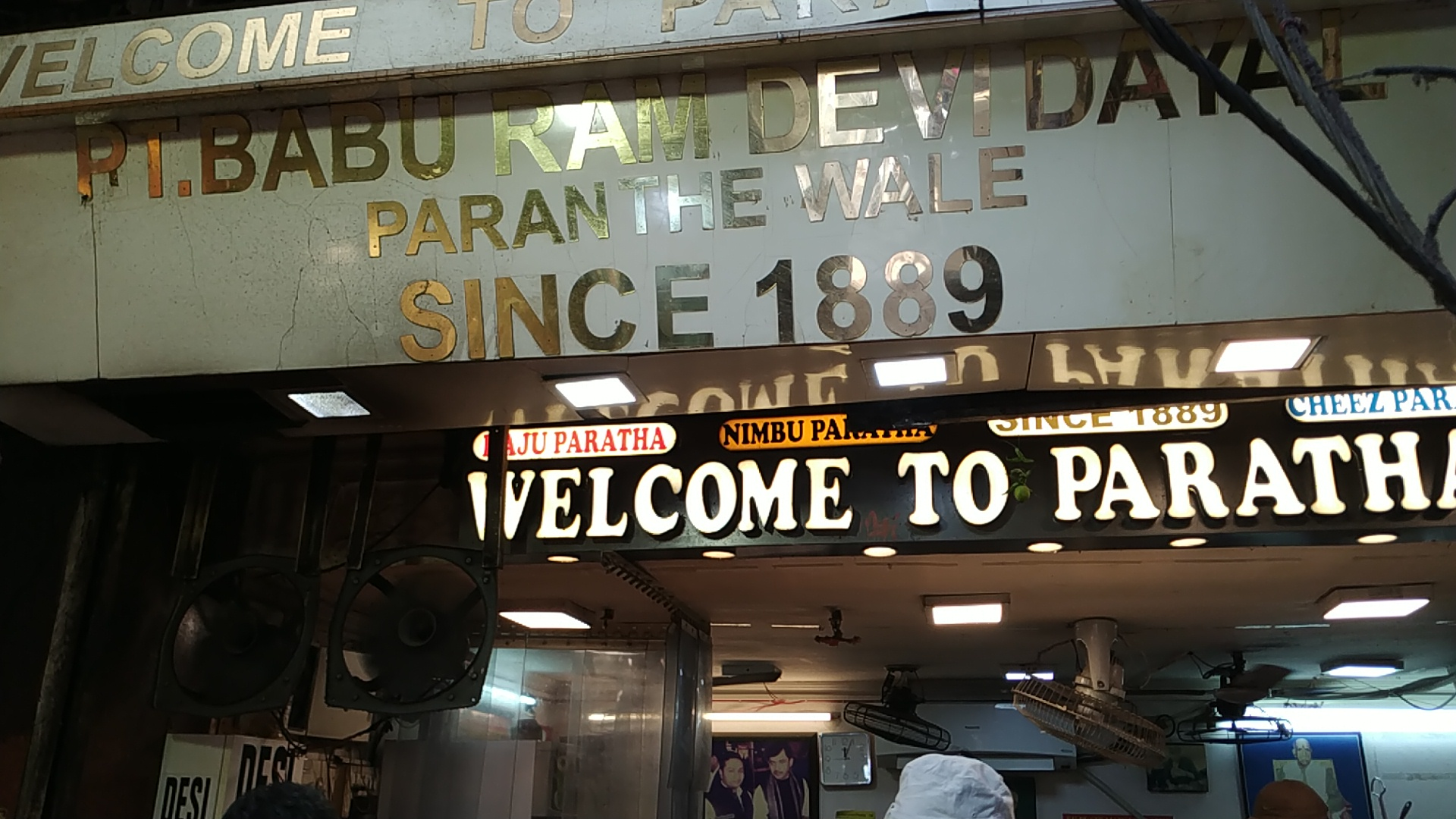
A store in Delhi

== Retail markets ==
- Connaught Place (CP), including Janpath and Palika Bazaar: Connaught Place stands as one of the most prestigious commercial markets in the world. With rents surpassing Rs 9,000 per square foot, it is ranked among the top ten most expensive marketplaces globally. CP hosts esteemed media firms, government offices, and banks. As the city's primary Central Business District (CBD), it pulsates with business and cultural vitality. The market is famous for branded apparel and accessories, handicrafts and souvenirs, books and stationery, watches and jewelry, leather goods, electronics and gadgets, trendy street shopping items from Janpath Market, perfumes and cosmetics, art and antiques, and food and gourmet items. The entire CP (shops, public spaces, transit traffic) sees tens of thousands to a few lakhs of visitors on typical weekdays, and much higher on weekends or holidays.
- Chandni Chowk: A market planned by Jahanara Begum, daughter of Mughal emperor Shah Jahan, dates back to the mid-17th century. Historically, it had shops known for silverwork. In the contemporary context, the main street retains its chaotic charm, while the labyrinthine bazaars branching off offer a diverse shopping experience for items ranging from tiffin tins to saris, spices to gold jewelry. The area also boasts a vibrant street food scene, providing an opportunity to savor local treats. In Chandni Chowk, you can buy traditional Indian clothing and bridal wear, jewelry and accessories, spices and dry fruits, sweets and street food, electronics and gadgets, perfumes and cosmetics, books and stationery, shoes and bags, religious items and idols, and fabrics and textiles. Chandni Chowk sees around 4 to 7 lakh visitors daily, under typical conditions.
- Karol Bagh including Ajmal Khan Road and Ghaffar Market Karol Bagh Market is one of the city’s oldest and most iconic shopping hubs. It’s famous for being a blend of traditional bazaars and modern retail, drawing both locals and tourists. Karol Bagh is most famous for wedding and bridal attire, jewelry and accessories, garments and readymade clothing, electronics and gadgets, shoes and bags, cosmetics and perfumes, books and stationery, leather goods, home décor items, and street food. The market witnesses a footfall of around 20,000-30,000 people per day. On weekend and festival days, it gets much higher.
- Paharganj: It was developed in the 17th century, during the reign of Shah Jahan, around the same time as it was developed in the 17th century, during the reign of Shah Jahan, around the same time as Old Delhi. Today, Paharganj’s Main Bazaar remains one of Delhi’s busiest markets, combining wholesale trade, tourist shopping, and budget stays. It is known for Clothes & Fabrics, Jewelry & Accessories, Leather Goods, Handicrafts & Home Décor, Books & Music, Bags & Luggage, Footwear and Quirky Souvenirs.
- Sarojini Nagar Market Sarojini Nagar Market was established in the 1950s–1960s as a planned commercial market under the Delhi Development Authority. In Sarojini Nagar Market, you can buy trendy export-surplus clothing, budget fashion, streetwear, accessories, bags, shoes, jewelry, scarves, belts, sunglasses, hats, wallets, home décor items, casual wear, t-shirts, tops, dresses, skirts, trousers, and winter wear. Sarojini Nagar Market in sees a daily footfall of approximately 50,000 to 60,000 visitors. During weekends and festive seasons, this number can double, reaching up to 1 lakh shoppers.
- Khan Market – Most expensive retail location in India, in terms of per square feet rental.
- Lajpat Nagar Central Market
- Dilli Haat - INA, Pitampura & Janakpuri – Government-run emporiums showcasing a rotating cast of regional artists and their crafts, such as bamboo & cane jewellery, hand-carved wooden articles and papier-mache animals.
- Hauz Khas Village Market.
- South Extension
- Meharchand Market, Lodhi Colony
- Nehru Place largest electronic market in the city
- Daryaganj
- Gandhi Nagar Cloth Market
- Rajouri Garden Main Market
- Tilak Nagar Main Market
- Lal Quarter Market, Krishna Nagar
- Rani Bagh Market
- Kamla Nagar Market

== Furniture Markets in Delhi ==
- Kirti Nagar Furniture Market
- Panchkuian Furniture Market, Gole Market
- MG Road Furniture Market, Ghitorni
- Jail Road Furniture Market (Janakpuri - Fateh Nagar)
- Paharganj
- Shastri Park Furniture Market

== Wholesale markets ==
- Old Delhi (Chandni Chowk): Often considered to be the largest wholesale market in Asia, the market deals primarily in general utilities, household items, jewelry, toys, fashion accessories, textiles & garments, electronics, stationery, artifacts, handicrafts, spices, dry fruits, food items, books, and novels. Though the market operates mainly on a wholesale basis, it also caters to the needs of a few retail shoppers. The market is closed on Sunday.
- Gandhi Nagar, Delhi
- Okhla Mandi
- Mehrauli
- Chandni Chowk
- Khari Baoli
- Bhajanpura
- Sadar Bazar

== Shopping malls in Delhi NCR ==
=== South Delhi ===
- Ansal Plaza, Andrews Ganj - first mall of Delhi
- Saket District Centre, Pushp Vihar
  - Select Citywalk
  - MGF Metropolitan
  - DLF Avenue
- Pacific Mall, Jasola
- The Chanakya Mall, Chanakyapuri
- JMD Kohinoor Mall, Greater Kailash II
- DLF South Square, Sarojini Nagar

=== South West Delhi ===
- Vasant Kunj
  - Ambience Mall
  - DLF Promenade
  - DLF Emporio
  - Vasant Square Mall, Sector B
- Worldmall, Aerocity (underconstruction)
- Dwarka
  - Dwarka City Centre, Sector 12
  - Soul City Mall, Sector 13
  - Vegas Mall, Sector 14
  - Pacific D21 Mall, Sector 21
  - The Omaxe State, Sector 19 (underconstruction)

=== West Delhi ===
- Pacific Mall, Tagore Garden
- Unity One Janakpuri
- RCube Monad, Raja Garden
- DLF Midtown Plaza, Moti Nagar
- Epicah Mall, Kirti Nagar

=== East Delhi ===
- Cross River Mall, CBD Shahdara
- Unity One CBD Shahdara
- Infinity SK Mall, Karkardooma
- V3S Mall, Nirman Vihar

=== Northwest Delhi ===
- Omaxe Chowk, Chandni Chowk
- Pacific Mall NSP, Pitampura
- Unity One Elegente NSP, Pitampura
- DT City Centre, Shalimar Bagh
- Unity One Rohini
- Rohini City Centre, Sector 10
- Metro Walk, Rohini

=== Gurgaon ===
- Ambience Mall, NH8
- MGF Metropolitan Mall, Sector 25
- Mega Mall, Golf Course Road
- Worldmark Gurgaon
- Airia Mall, Sector 68
- AIPL Joy Street, Sector 66
- M3M 65th Avenue
- Elan Epic Mall, Sector 70
- Elan Miracle Mall, Sector 84
- The Esplanade Mall
- Omaxe City Centre, Sector 49
- South Poin Mall, Golf Course Road

=== Faridabad ===
- World Street by Omaxe
- Crown Interiorz Mall, Sector 35
- EF3 Mall
- Pacific Mall, Bata Chowk
- Eldeco Mall, Bata Chowk
- Pebble Downtown, Bata Chowk
- Metro Mall, NIT

=== Ghaziabad ===
- Pacific Mall, Kaushambi
- EDM Kaushambi
- Mahagun Metro Mall, Vaishali
- North India Mall, Indirapuram
- Bhutani City Centre, Mohan Nagar
- KW Delhi 6 Mall, Raj Nagar Extension
- Gaur Central Mall, Raj Nagar
- The Opulant Mall, Nehru Nagar
- Gaur City Mall, Gaur City

=== Noida ===
- DLF Mall of India, Sector 18
- Logix City Centre, Sector 32
- The Great India Place, Sector 38
- Modi Mall, Sector 25
- Wave Mall, Sector 18
- Metro Spectrum Plaza, Sector 72

=== Greater Noida ===
- Ansal Plaza, Pari Chowk
- The Grand Venice Mall, near Pari Chowk

== See also ==
- List of shopping malls in India
