= The Grand Venice Mall =

- Location: Greater Noida, Uttar Pradesh, India
- Coordinates: 28.4529°N 77.5260°E
- Address: Surajpur-Kasna road, near Pari Chowk, Greater Noida, Uttar Pradesh
- Opened: 2015
- Architect: Bhasin Group
- Num. of stores: 258
- Num. of anchor tenants: 10
- Floor area: 88,000 m^{2} (950,000 sq ft)
- Floors: 4
- Parking: 10,000+ vehicles
- Website: veniceindia.com

The Grand Venice Mall, also known as TGV Mall, is an Italian-themed shopping mall in Greater Noida, Uttar Pradesh, India. It covers 947,000 square feet and was opened in 2015. It is decorated with replicas of Roman statues and Venetian buildings, and has two canals with gondola rides for visitors.

The mall has 258 stores representing Indian and international chains and brands. It also includes a food court, Mastiii Zone entertainment area with features such as a snow theme park (Snow Mastiii), zip line ride, VR games, trampoline park, adventure park, a bowling alley, cricket lanes, 7D cinema, horror house and a Cinépolis multiplex cinema.

The Grand Venice Mall is located in Plot No SH3, Site IV, Greater Noida, adjacent to Pari Chowk metro station.

== See also ==
- List of shopping malls in India
