= Ahinsa Sthal =

Jain temple in Mehrauli, India

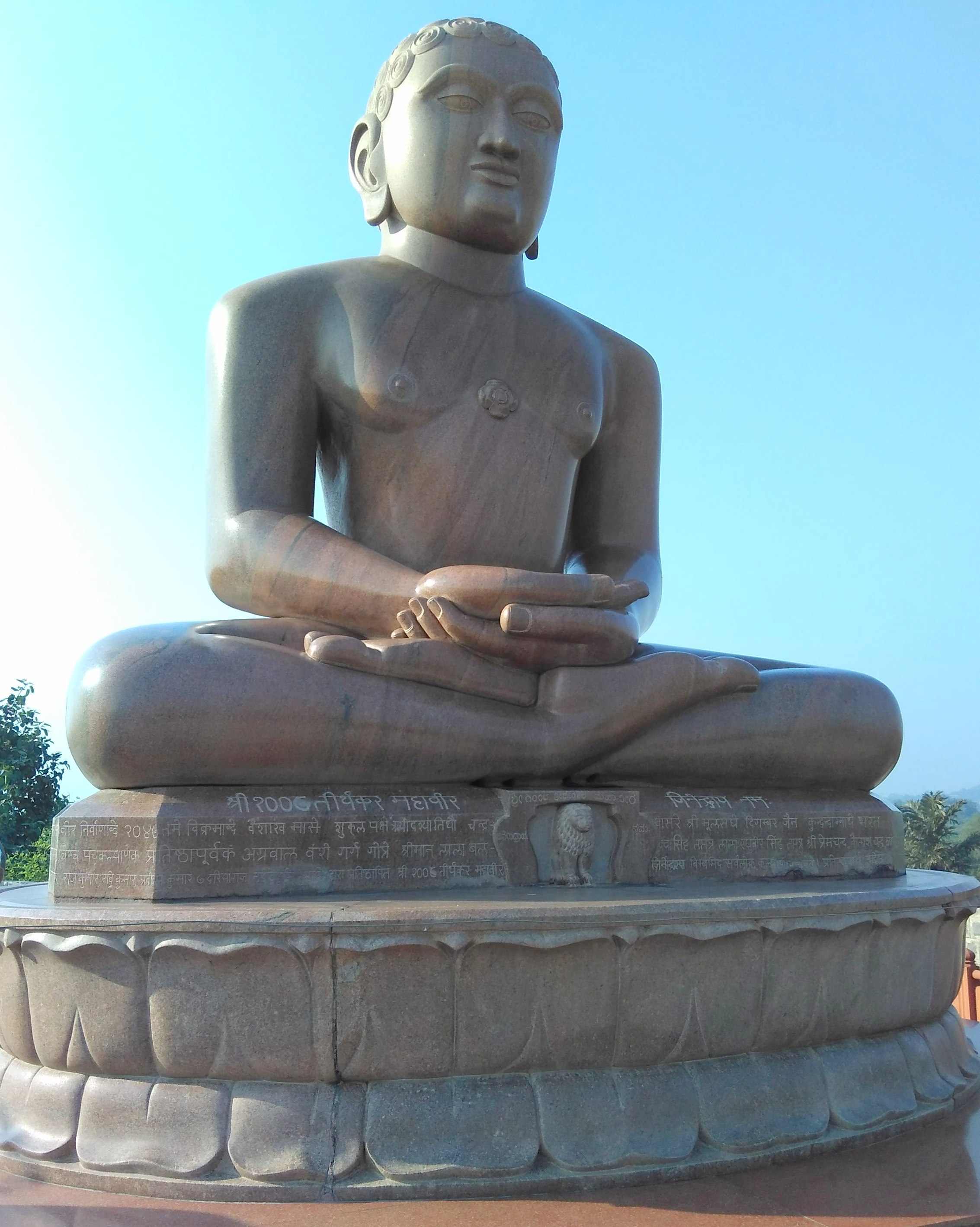
- Statue of Tirthankara Mahāvīra at Ahinsa Sthal

- Location within Delhi

Religion
- Affiliation: Jainism
- Deity: Mahavira
- Festival: Mahavir Jayanti

Location
- Location: Mehrauli, Delhi, India
- Interactive map of Ahinsa Sthal
- Coordinates: 28°31′13″N 77°11′24″E

Architecture
- Established: 1980
- Temple: 2

Ahinsa Sthal is a Jain temple located in Mehrauli, Delhi. The main deity of the temple is Mahavira, the 24th and last Tirthankara (human spiritual guide) of Avasarpiṇī (present half cycle of time). A magnificent statue of Tirthankara Mahāvīra is installed here.

== Statue ==
The statue of Mahavira was carved out of a granite rock in Karkala in Lotus position. The height of the statue is 13 feet 6 inches. Its weight is around 30 tonnes. The height of the lotus pedestal is 2 feet 8 inches and it weighs around 17 tonnes.

== Gallery ==
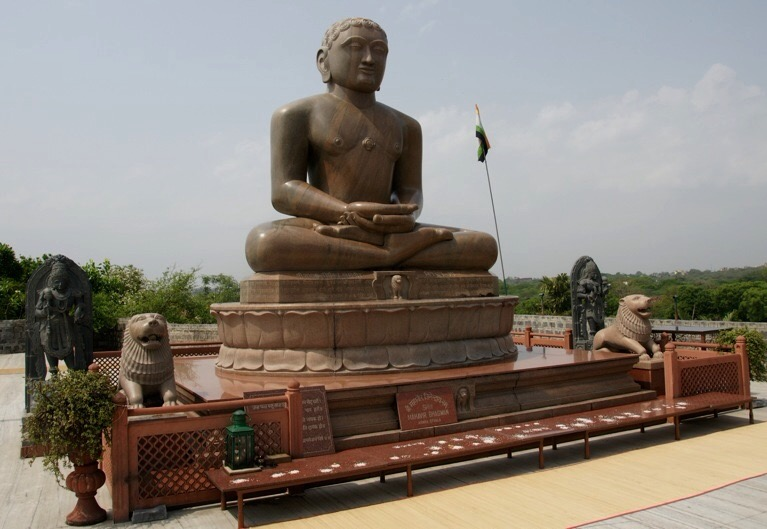
Statue of Tirthankara Mahāvīra at Ahinsa sthal

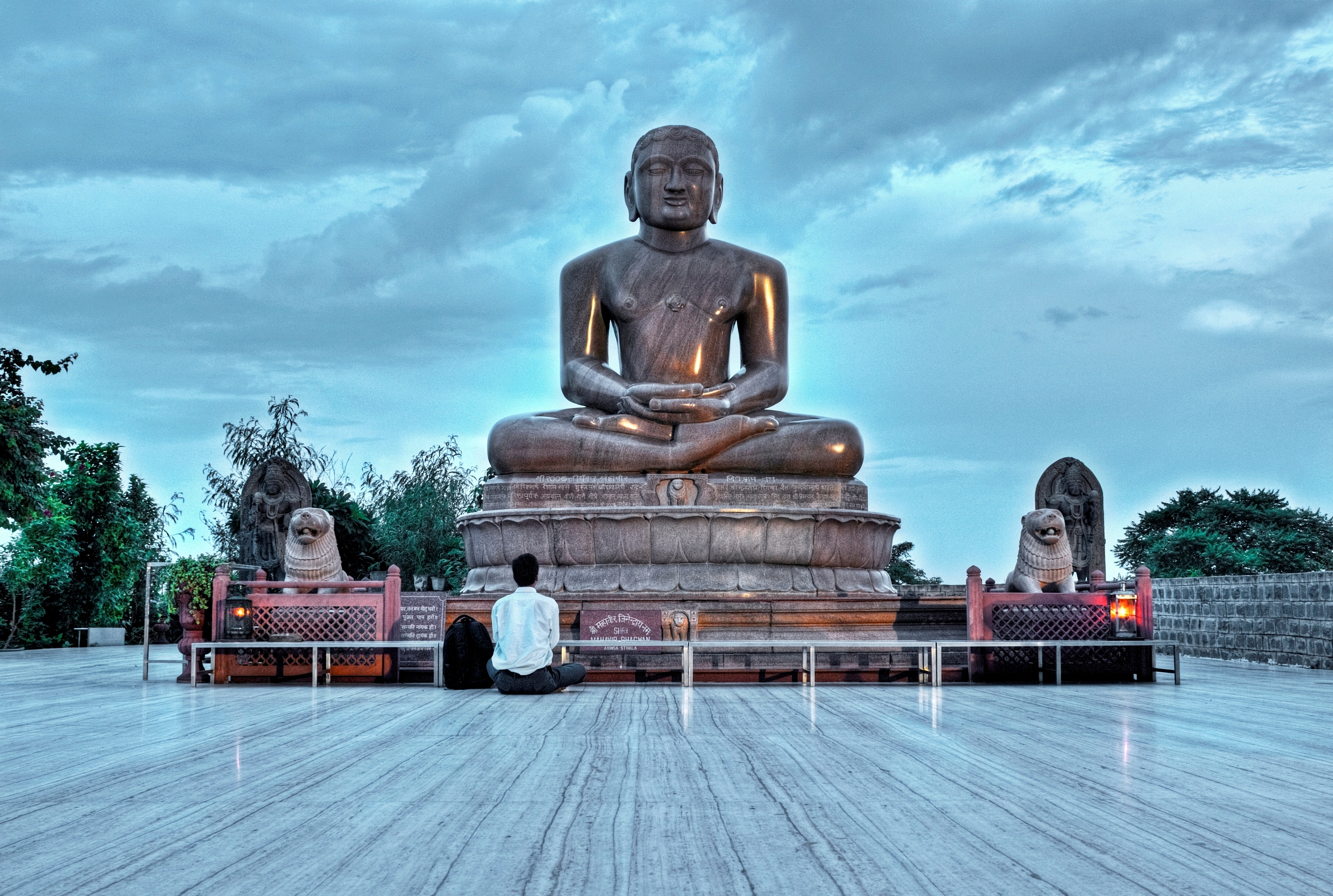
Lord Mahavira's statue

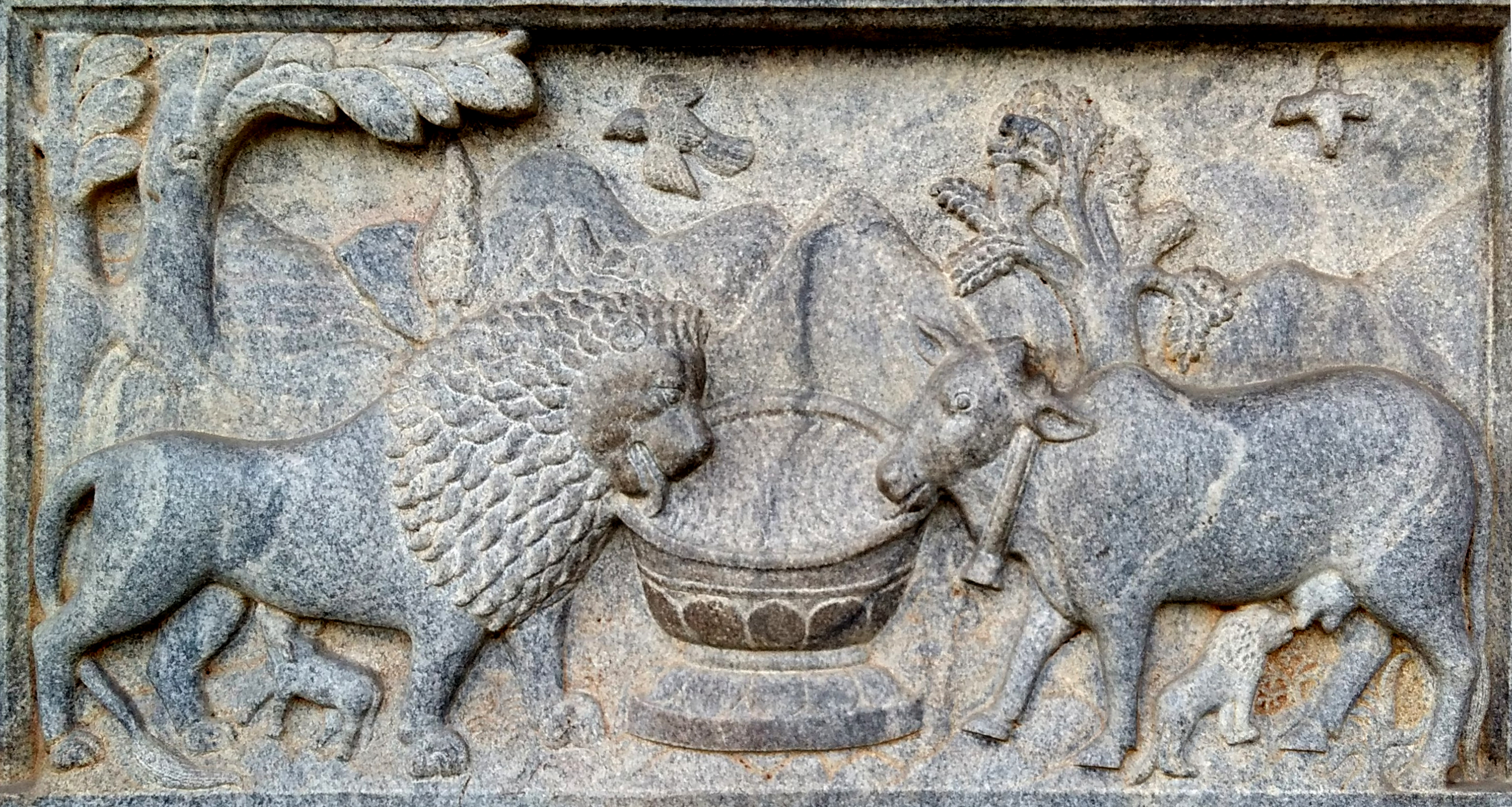
Sculpture depicting Mahavira's message

== See also ==
- Sri Digambar Jain Lal Mandir
- Jainism in Delhi
