= ISKCON Temple, Delhi =

Radha Krishna Temple in Delhi, India

ISKCON New Delhi
- Sri Sri Radha Parthasarathi Mandir
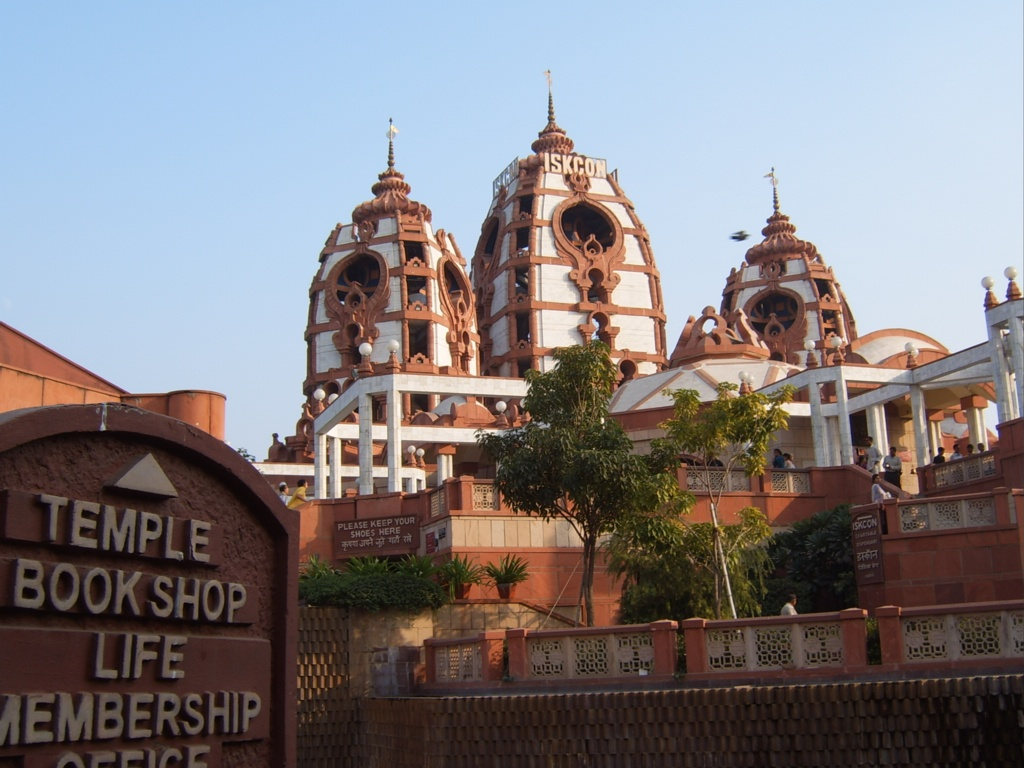
- Outer View of Temple

- Location in Delhi

Religion
- Affiliation: Hinduism
- District: New Delhi
- Deity: Radha Parthasarathi (Krishna and Radha)

Location
- Location: Hare Krishna Hills, East of Kailash
- State: Delhi
- Country: India
- Coordinates: 28°33′29″N 77°14′36″E

Architecture
- Type: Hindu temple architecture
- Completed: 1998

Website
- iskcondelhi

Sri Sri Radha Parthasarathi Mandir, generally known as the ISKCON Temple Delhi, is a Hindu temple dedicated to Krishna and Radha in the form of Radha Parthasarathi. The temple was inaugurated on 5 April 1998 by the then Prime Minister of India, Atal Bihari Vajpayee in the presence of the former Chief Minister of Delhi, Sahib Singh Verma, and Sushma Swaraj. It is located at Hare Krishna Hills (near Nehru Place), in East of Kailash area of Delhi, India.

== Temple Complex ==
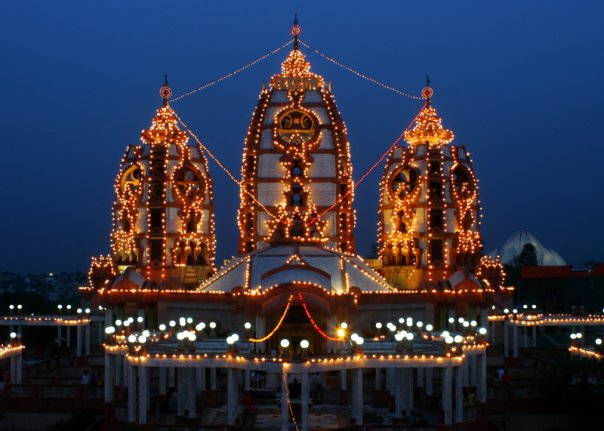
Temple during Janamashtami

ISKCON Temple, designed and built by Achyut Kanvinde who in 1993 agreed to accept a pro-bono commission to build this temple complex for the followers of Srila Prabhupada, is one of the largest temple complexes in India. It comprises numerous rooms for priests and service renders. The temple also has a 375-seater auditorium used for cultural and religious functions. It has many halls that are used for administration purposes and various seminars. It is divided into four broad sections.

=== Glory of India Vedic Cultural Centre ===
The temple complex houses the Glory of India Vedic Cultural Centre, a popular destination for visitors and tourists to learn about major Hindu texts which are presented using various multimedia technologies, including:

1. Bhagavad Gita Animatronics - Using a blend of dramatic narration, lasers, and projections, this show allows visitors to learn the five major concepts of the Bhagavad Gita, the three modes of nature, and the Yoga systems presented therein.
2. Mahabharat Experience - A light and sound show that presents the storyline of the Mahabharat which concisely spans thousands of verses.
3. Ramayana Art Gallery - A collection of over 30 original oil paintings painted by ISKCON's members from the USA, Russia, India, and the UK.
4. Bhagavat Puran Exhibit - This exhibit visually presents one of the most important texts in the Vaishnava tradition.

==== World's Largest Sacred Book ====
The Glory of India Vedic Cultural Centre holds the 'Astounding Bhagavad Gita,' the largest printed book of the major text of any world religion. The Italian-printed 'Astounding Bhagavad Gita', which weighs 800 kg and measures over 2.8 metres, was unveiled by the Prime Minister of India Narendra Modi on 26 February 2019 in the presence of the Tridandi Sannyasi Gopal Krishna Goswami and India's Culture Minister Dr. Mahesh Sharma.

== Gallery ==
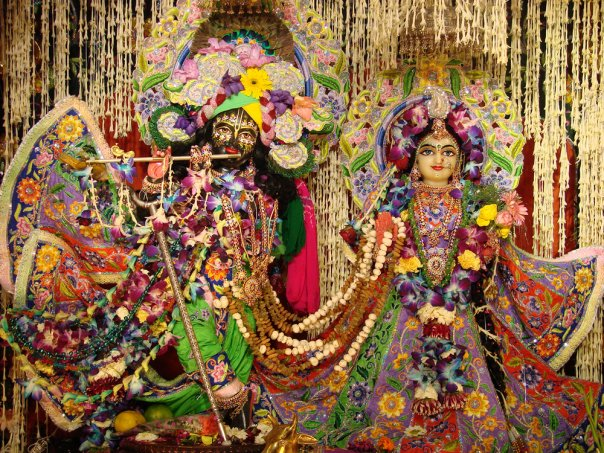
Radha Parthasarathi, the premier deity of temple

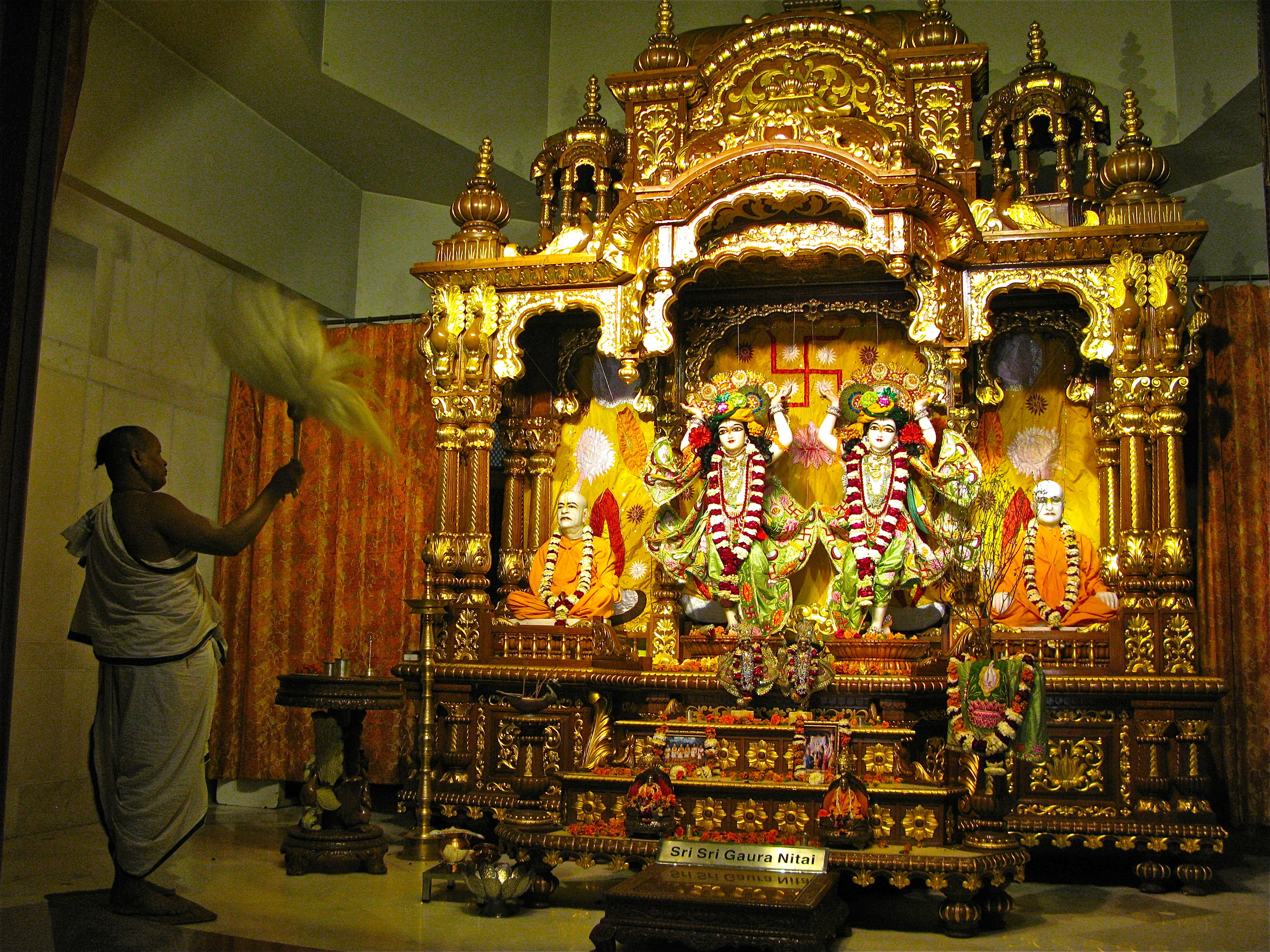
Gaura Nitai shrine at ISKCON temple, Delhi.

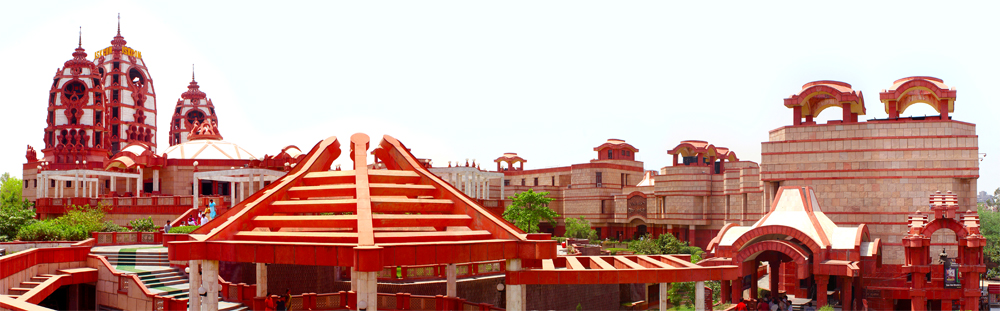
Panoramic view of ISKCON Temple

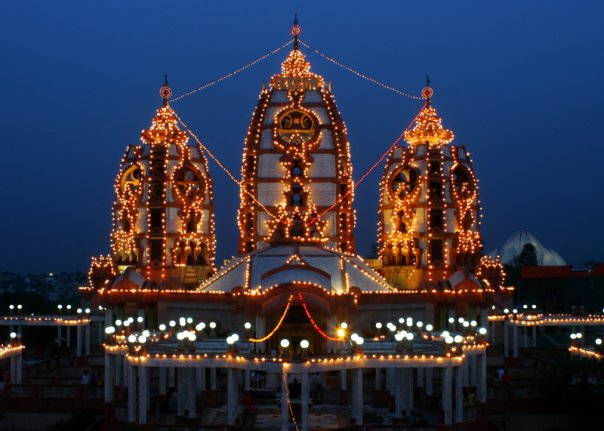
Temple on Janmashtami Night

== See also ==
- Vaishnavism
- ISKCON Temple Chennai
- ISKCON Temple Patna
- ISKCON Temple Visakhapatnam
- Gaudiya Vaishnavism
- Svayam Bhagavan
- Delhi
- noida
