= Shanti Stupa =

Shanti Stupa may refer to:

- Shanti Stupa, Delhi
- Shanti Stupa, Ladakh
- Shanti Stupa, Pokhara
