= Indraprastha Park =

Park in New Delhi

Millennium Park
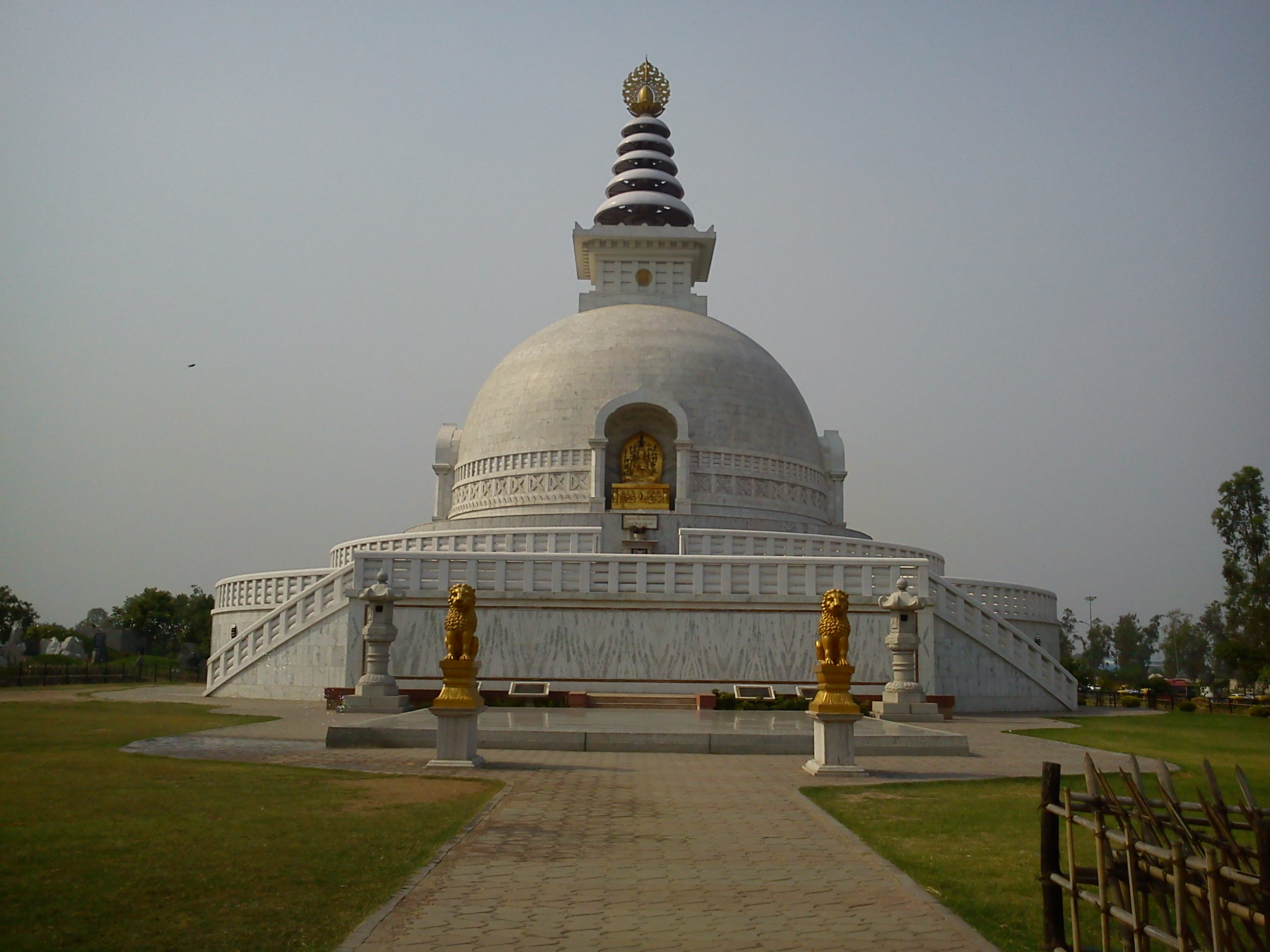
- Vishwa Shanti Stupa (World Peace Pagoda) at the park in New Delhi

- Location within Delhi
- Interactive map of Millennium Park
- Coordinates: 28°36′04″N 77°15′13″E

The Millennium Park is a park on the Outer Ring Road in the east of Delhi, India. It was constructed in 2004 by the Delhi Development Authority. The park includes a children's park, an amphitheatre and a food court.

A large World Peace Stupa called Shanti Stupa was opened in the park on 14 November 2007 by monks and nuns of Nipponzan Myohoji, the 14th Dalai Lama, and the Lt. Governor of Delhi.

This park was completely made from a landfill site.

== See also ==
- List of parks in Delhi
