= Jahanpanah City Forest =

Park in Greater Kailash, India

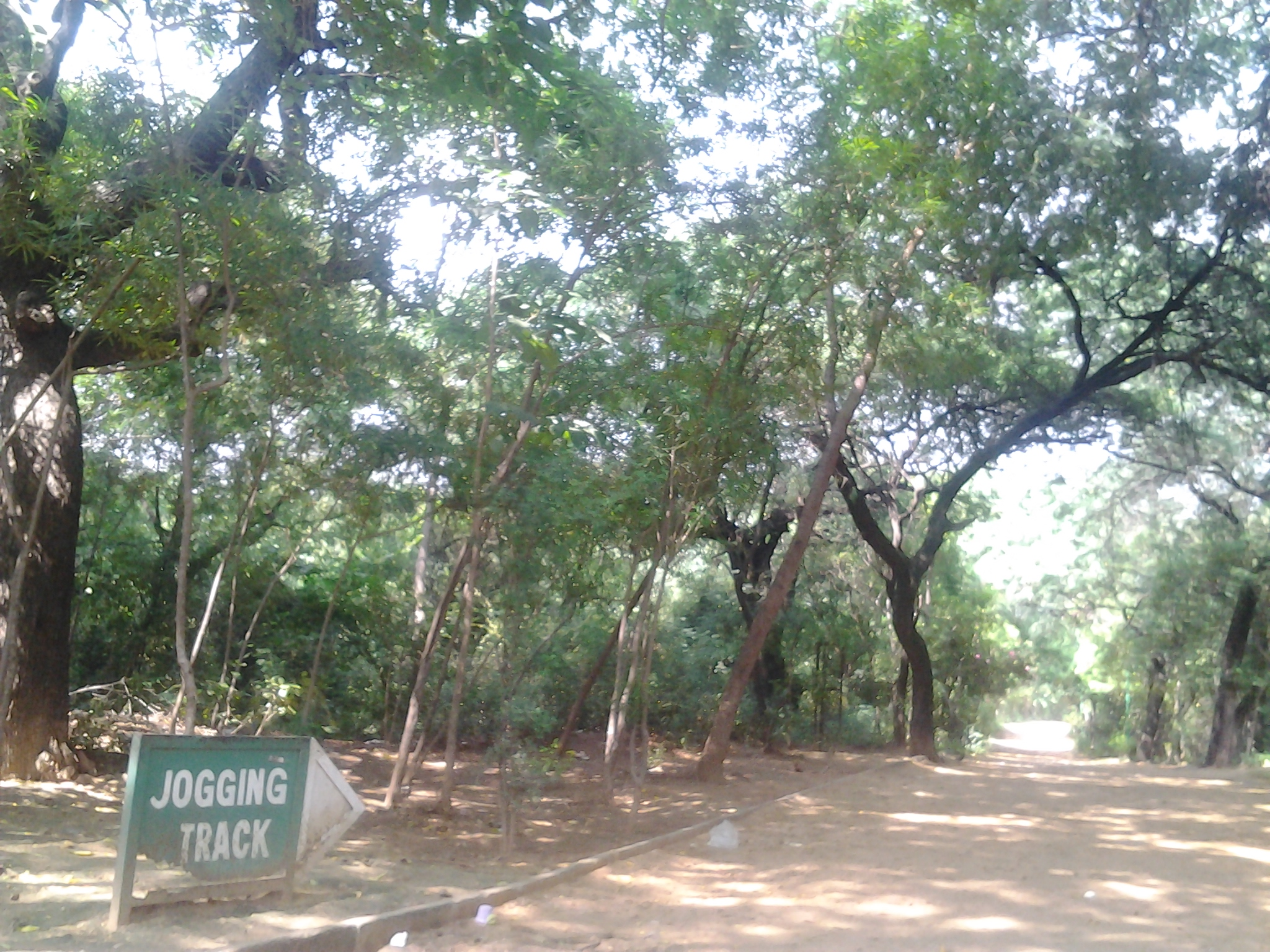
- Jogging track inside the Jahanpanah City Forest
- Interactive map of Jahanpanah City Forest
- Type: Natural Area
- Location: Greater Kailash, Chirag Delhi
- Coordinates: 28.526675°N 77.243891°E
- Area: 435 odd acres
- Operator: Municipal Corporation of Delhi and Delhi Development Authority
- Open: 5:00am-10:00am (in morning), 4:00pm-6:00pm (in evening)
- Status: Open

Jahanpanah City Forest is located in South Delhi. It is a densely forested park in Delhi spreading over 435 acres of land. The park is accessible from Greater Kailash II, Tughlakabad Extension, Batra Gate, Dhobi Ghat, Sheikh Sarai, Chirag Delhi, Masjid Moth DDA Flats and Balvantray Mehta Vidya Bhawan School.

== See also ==
- List of parks in Delhi
