= Sunder Nursery =

Park in New Delhi, India

- Central Park of Delhi, Azim Bagh
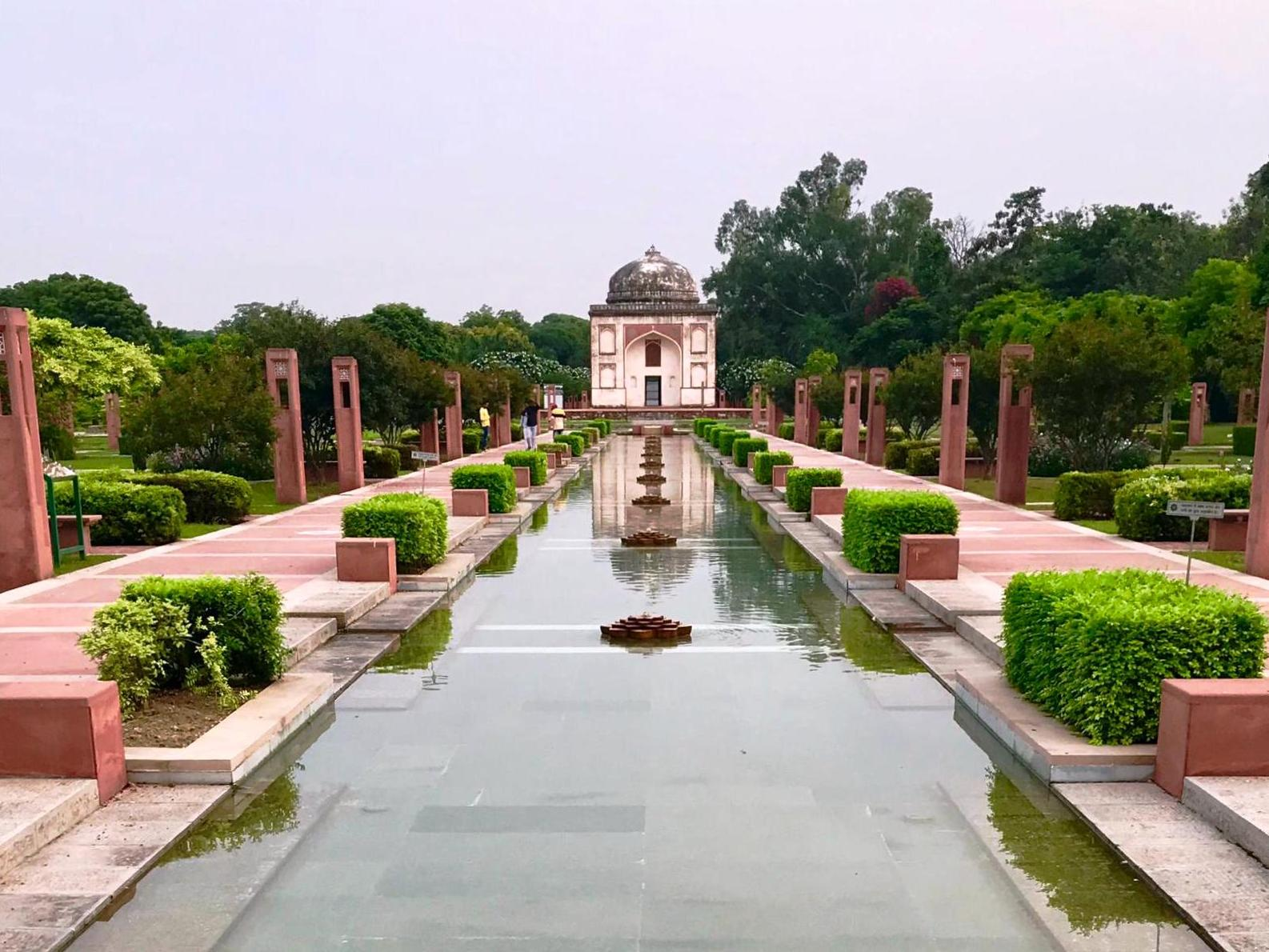
- Sunderwala Burj and reflecting water canal
- Interactive map of Sunder Nursery
- Type: Heritage Park, City Park
- Location: Delhi
- Coordinates: 28.596874°N 77.245339°E,
- Area: 90 acres (0.36 km^{2})
- Created: 16th century
- Designer: Mohammad Shaheer; Aga Khan Trust for Culture
- Owner: Government of India
- Operator: Aga Khan Trust for Culture; Central Public Works Department; Archaeological Survey of India; South Delhi Municipal Corporation
- Status: Open all days from sunrise to sunset
- Website: www.sundernursery.org

Sunder Nursery, formerly called Azim Bagh or Bagh-e-Azeem, is a 16th-century heritage park complex adjacent to the Humayun's Tomb, a UNESCO World Heritage Site in Delhi. Originally known as Azim Bagh and built by the Mughals in the 16th century, it lies on the Mughal-era Grand Trunk Road, and is spread over 90 acres (36 hectare). Future plans aim to link nearby areas to develop it into India's largest park covering 900 acres.

Today Sunder Nursery contains fifteen heritage monuments of which 6 are UNESCO World Heritage Sites, including Archaeological Survey of India (ASI) protected Sundarwala Burj, Sundarwala Mahal and Lakkarwala Burj.

After renovations starting in 2007, the nursery reopened to public as a heritage park on 21 February 2018. Now it contains over 300 types of trees, making it Delhi's first arboretum.

During the British Raj, the nursery was established to grow experimental and exotic plants; it also has a lake which gave it its current designation as a nursery. The Sunder Burj tomb lends the space the Sunder in Sunder Nursery. Although the name Sunder Nursery is still used locally, the park has been termed "Delhi's Central Park" after renovations (not to be confused with the Central Park in Connaught Place, New Delhi).

== Restoration ==
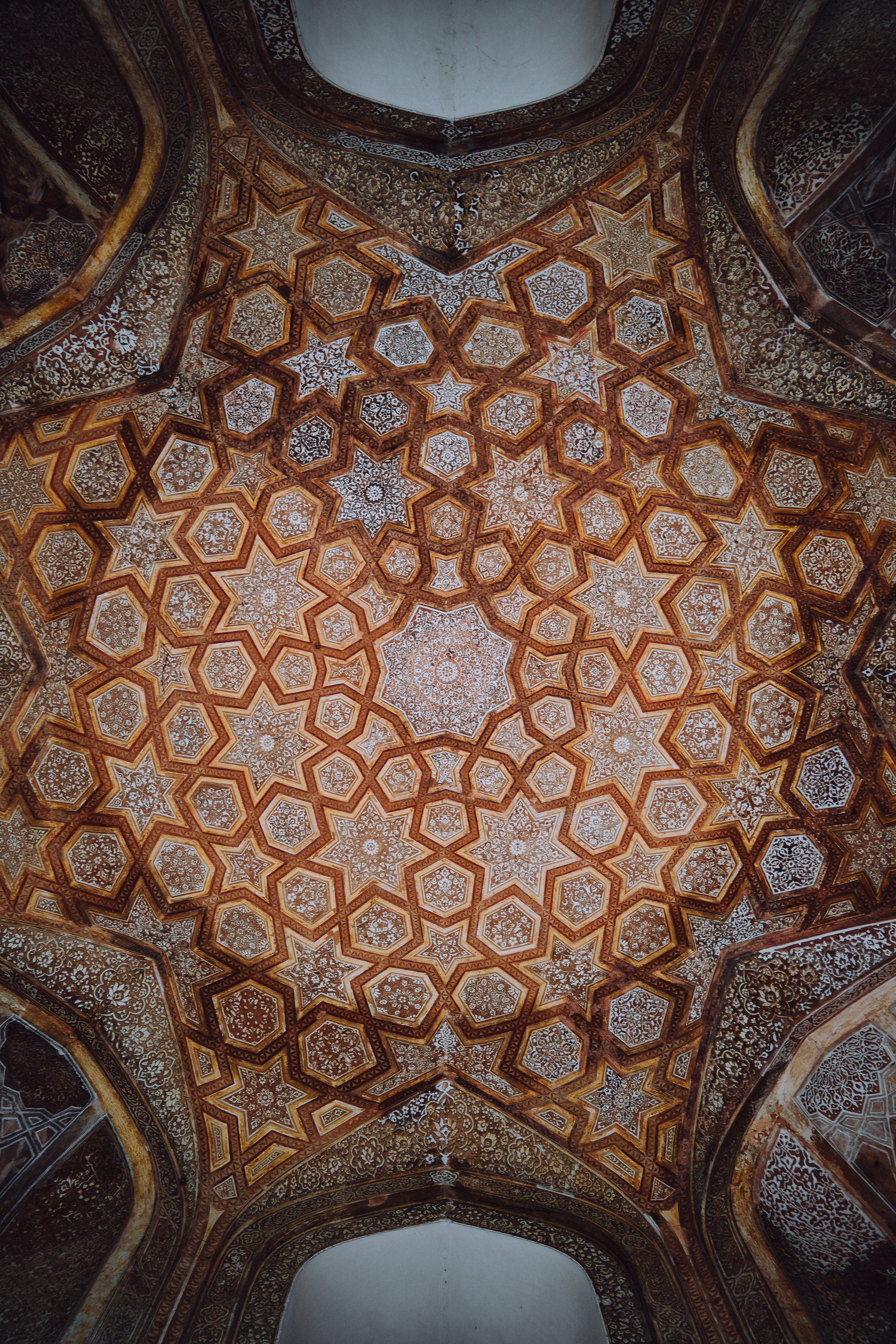
Decoration of the dome inside Sunder Burj

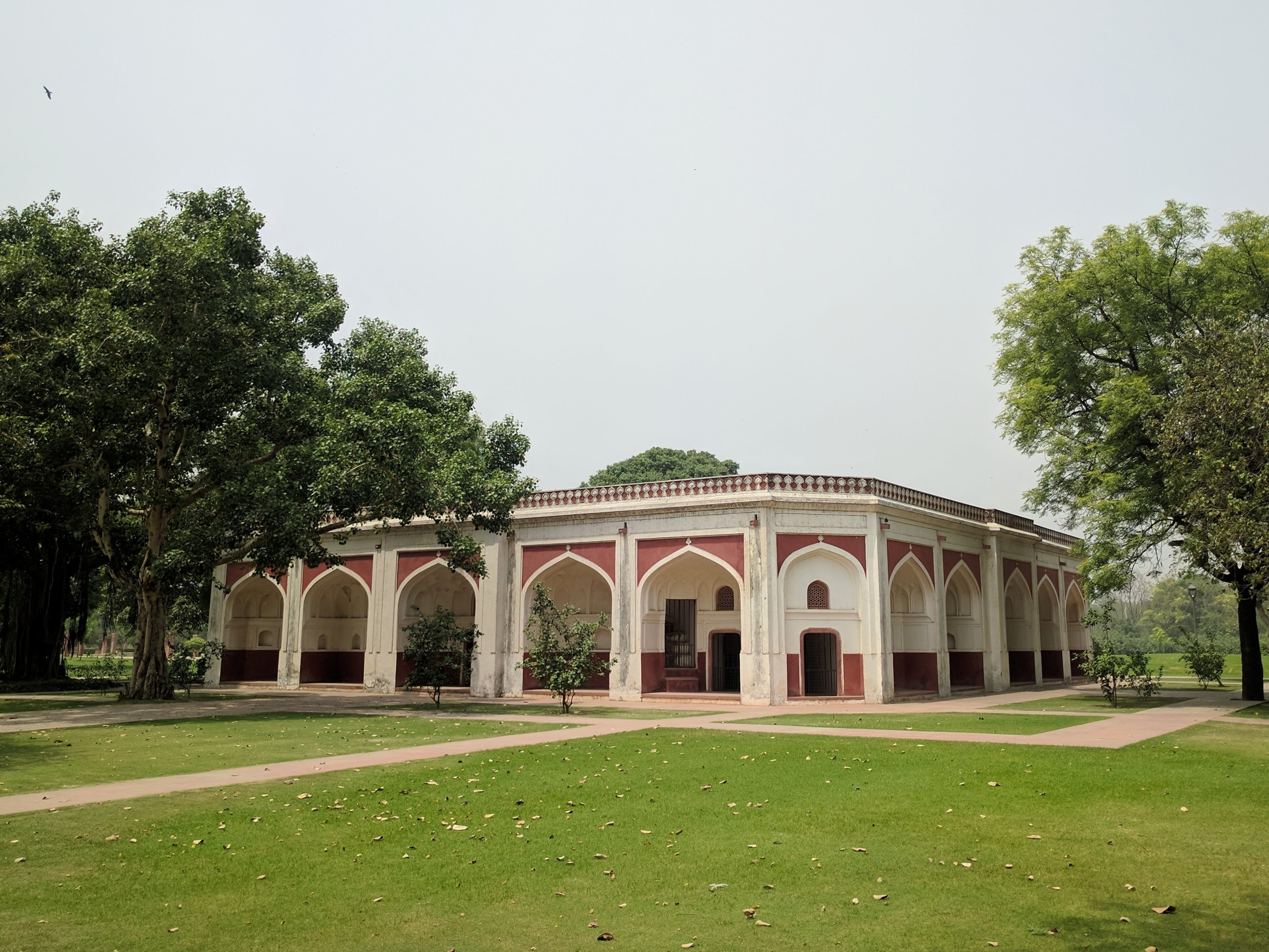
Sunderwala Mahal after renovation in 2018

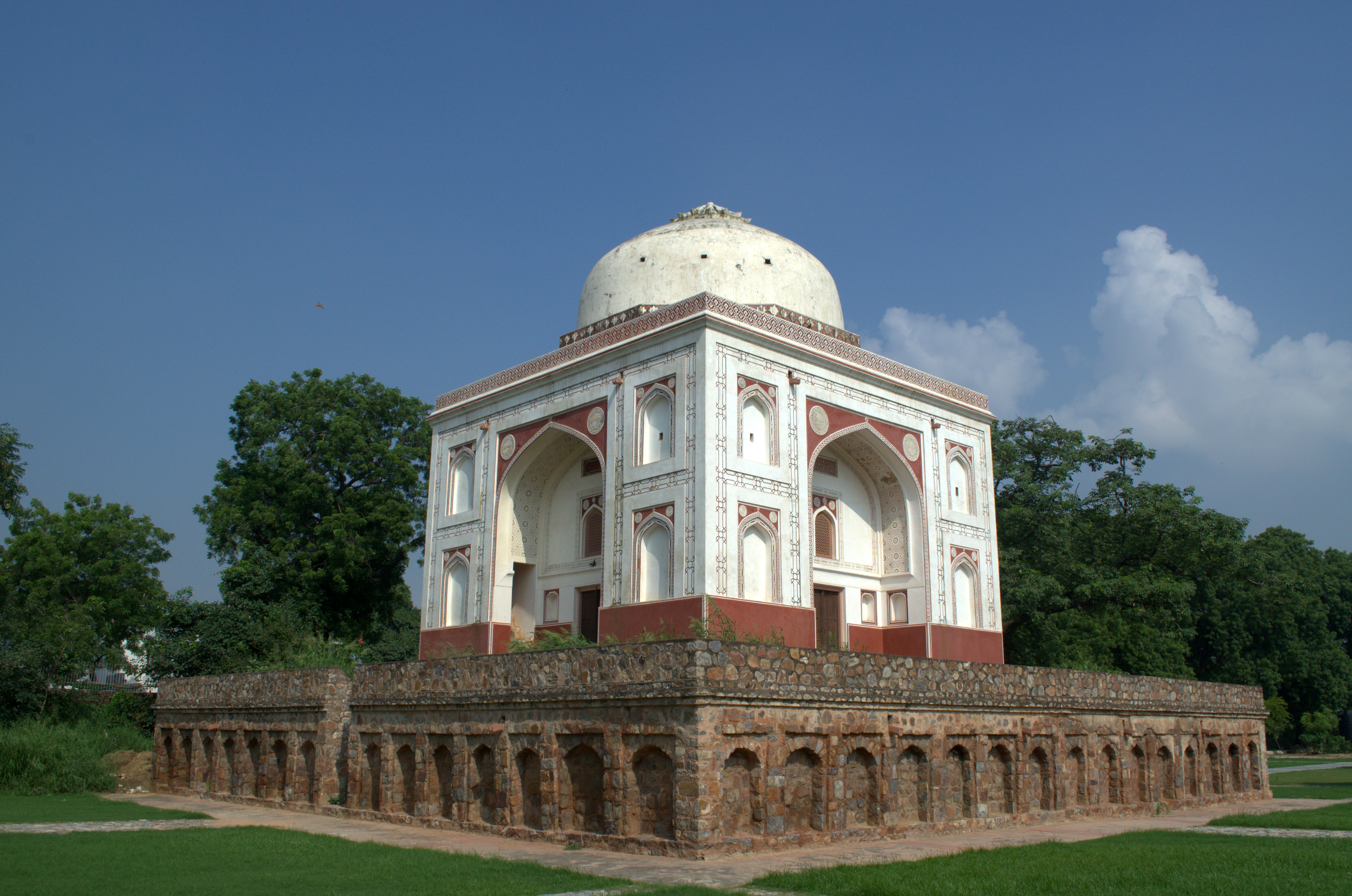
Lakharwala Gumbad

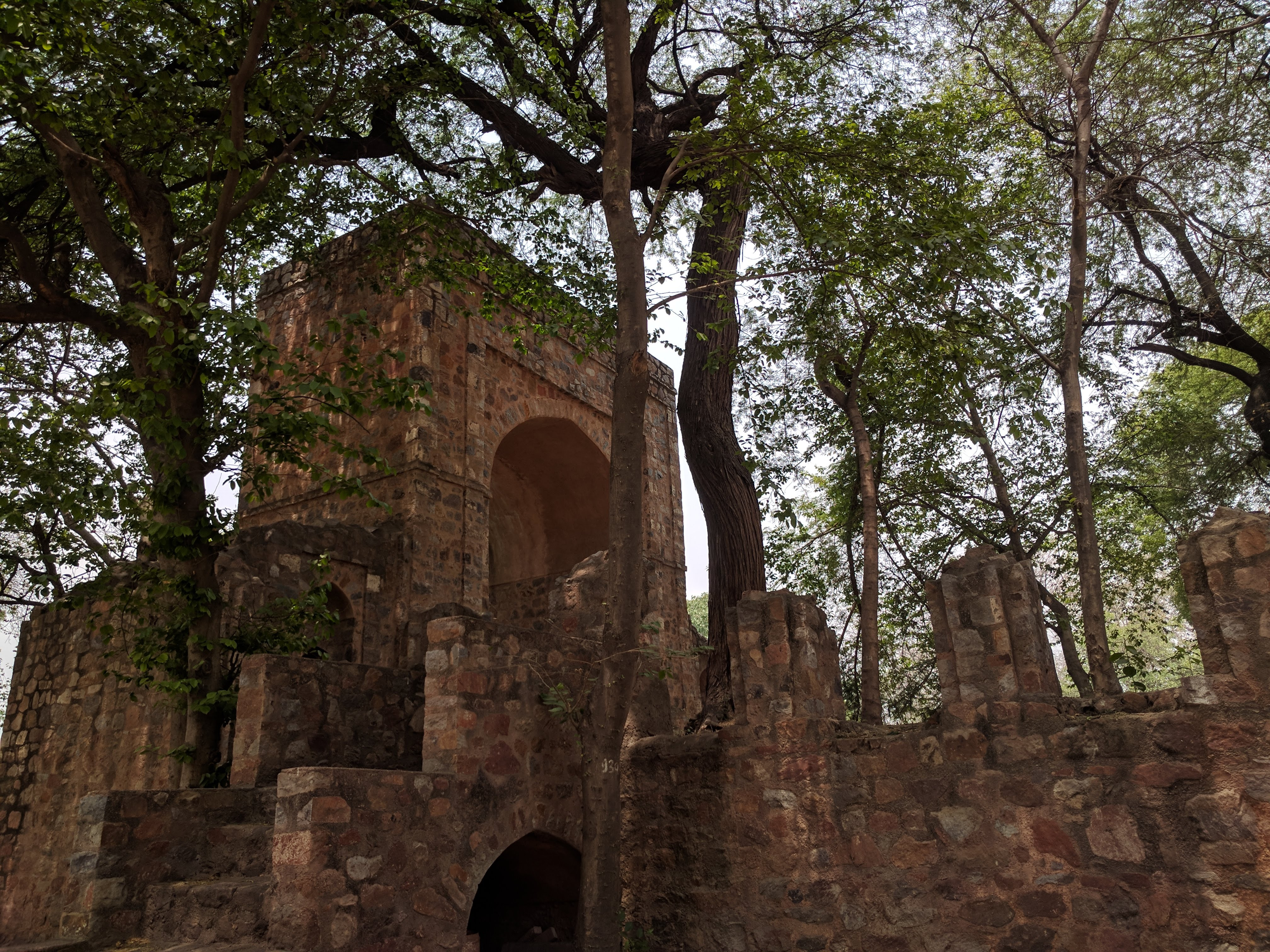
An arched Mughal platform

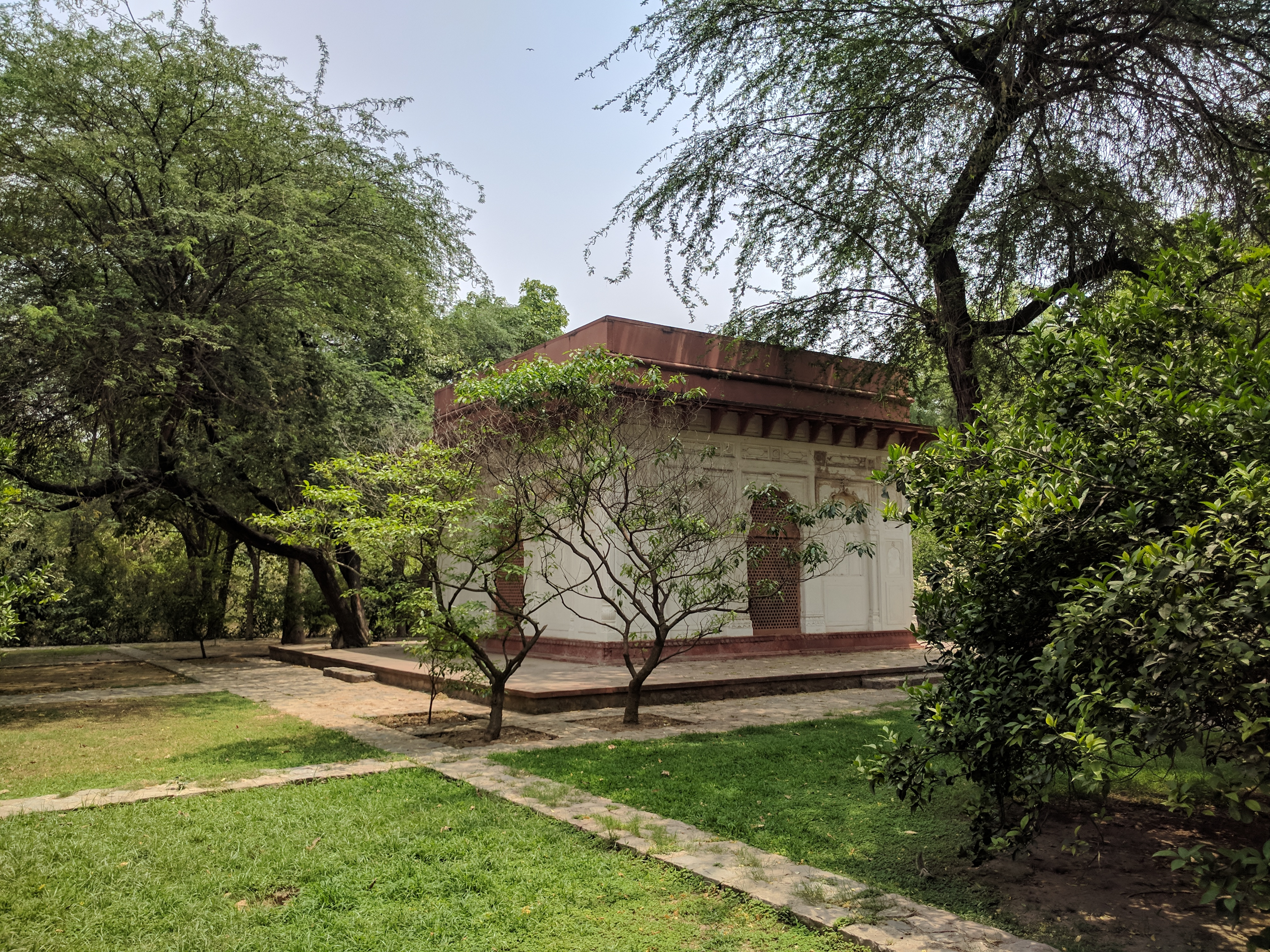
Mughal garden pavilion

=== Nizamuddin Urban Renewal Project ===
Sunder Nursey is part of the larger Nizamuddin Urban Renewal Project master plan of the Aga Khan Trust, which involves restoration work on 30 nearby heritage structures. Once complete, the park and resorted monuments will cover 900 acres (3.64 km sq). Since 2007 conservation of over 50 monuments have taken place of which 12 were designated World Heritage Sites by UNESCO in 2016.

Future plans aim to run the area as a public-private partnership (PPP) between the various government authorities in India and the Aga Khan Trust.

=== Organisations and Agencies Involved ===
The garden complex is undergoing an extensive restoration project, undertaken by Aga Khan Trust for Culture India, jointly with Archaeological Survey of India (ASI) and Central Public Works Department (CPWD) which currently runs the garden.

The following agencies are involved in this extensive restoration project:

- Ministry of Housing and Urban Affairs, Government of India
- Archaeological Survey of India
- Central Public Works Department
- South Delhi Municipal Corporation
- US Ambassador's Fund for Cultural Preservation
- Norwegian Agency for Development Cooperation

=== Restoration of Nursery ===
Plans for the project were drawn up in 2007, and work on the third phase was initiated in 2010 and completed in 2018, with 90 acres of the park being opened to the public on 21 February 2018. The vice-president of India, M Venkaiah Naidu, was present during the inauguration along with various other dignitaries including the Aga Khan founder and chairman of the Aga Khan Development Network.

Lying abandoned for decades, much of the area was overgrown, and during the initial work some 1,000 trucks of rubble was removed before the ground was levelled. Subsequently, classical Persian gardens were recreated, with fountains and water channels characteristic to this style of garden. Two main architectural features were restored; the Lakkarwala Burj tomb is now set in a new rose garden, whilst the 16th-century Sunderwala Burj tomb was restored as per the orange sandstone and white lime mortar used in its original design. Its red sandstone interior walls saw entire sections of white Quranic verses being recreated. The garden replicates the four micro-habitat zones which were part of Delhi's original landscape namely Kohi (ridge), Bangar (alluvial), Khadar (riverine) and Dabar (marsh).

Conservators reconstructed missing geometric decoration and collapsed portions of the monuments using surviving architectural evidence. The lime mortar used in the restoration included urad dal, jaggery, wood apple juice and egg white.

== Important Features ==
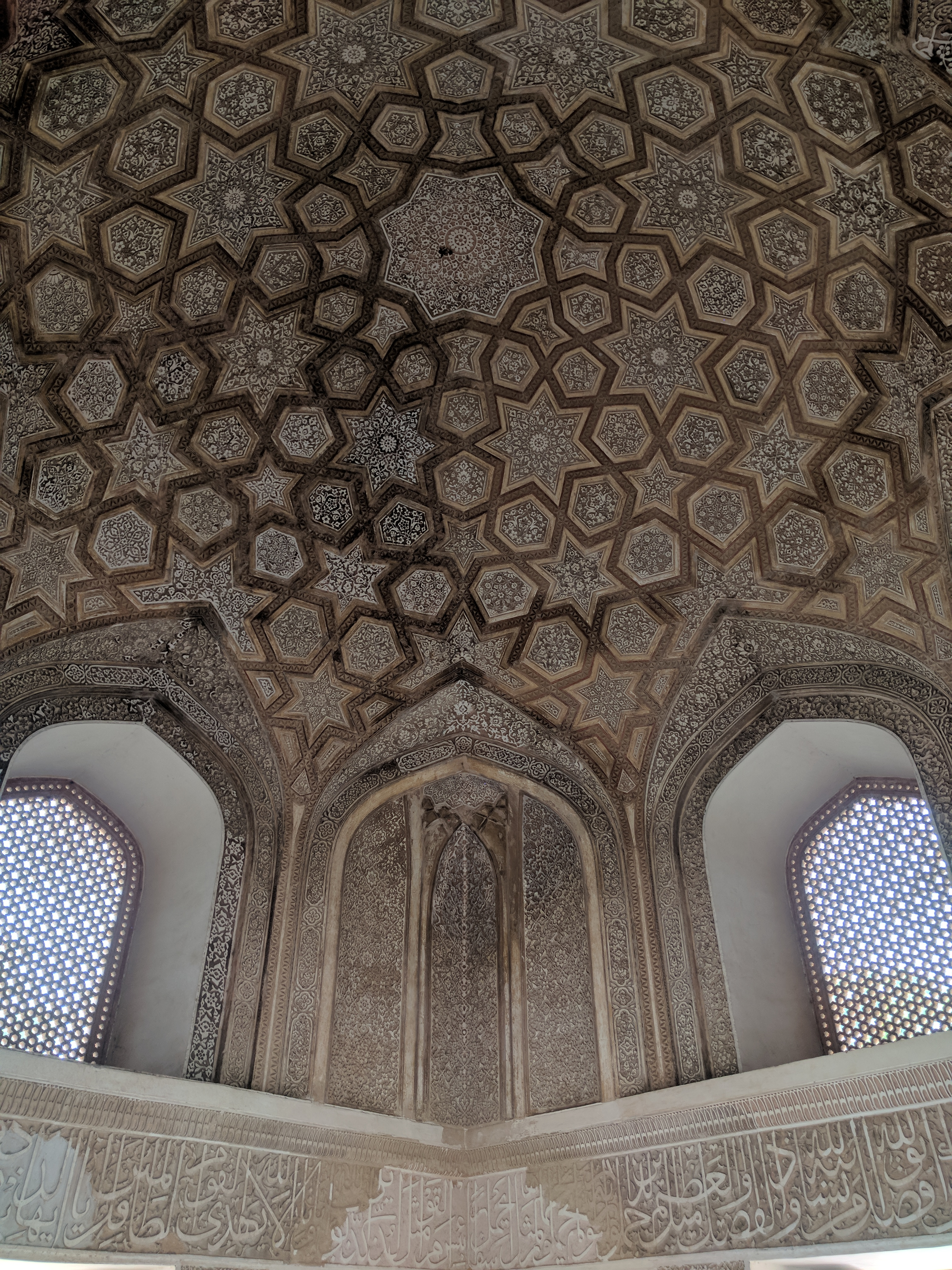
Interior Dome, Squinch and windows of Sunder Burj

=== Monuments ===
UNESCO World Heritage status has been given to the following six structures within Sunder Nursery: Sunder Burj, Sundarwala Mahal, Lakkarwala Burj, Mirza Muazzafar Hussain's Tomb, Chotta Bateshewala and the Unknown Mughal's Tomb.

=== Wildlife ===
==== Flora ====
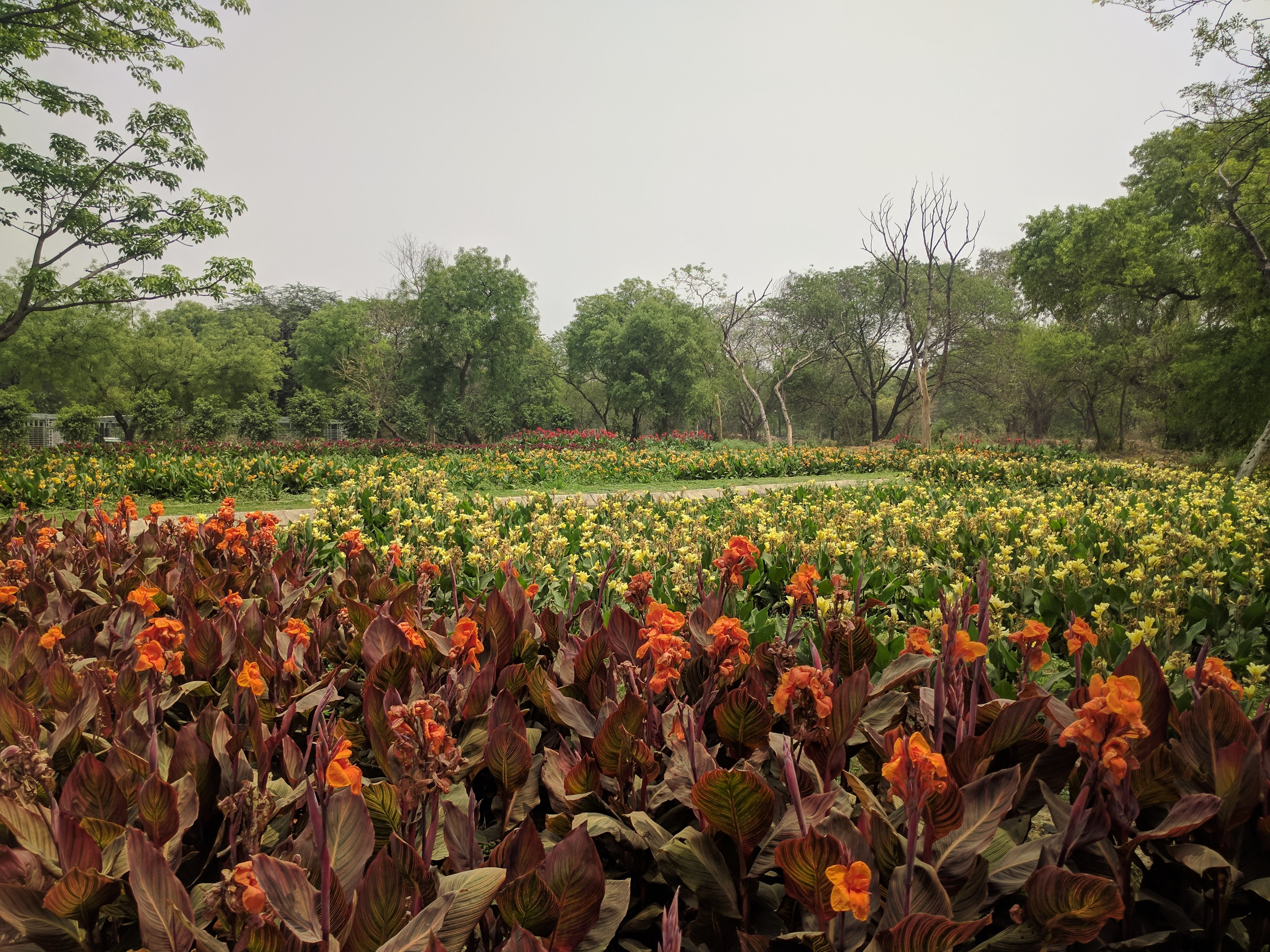
Canna Plant Section, Sunder Nursery

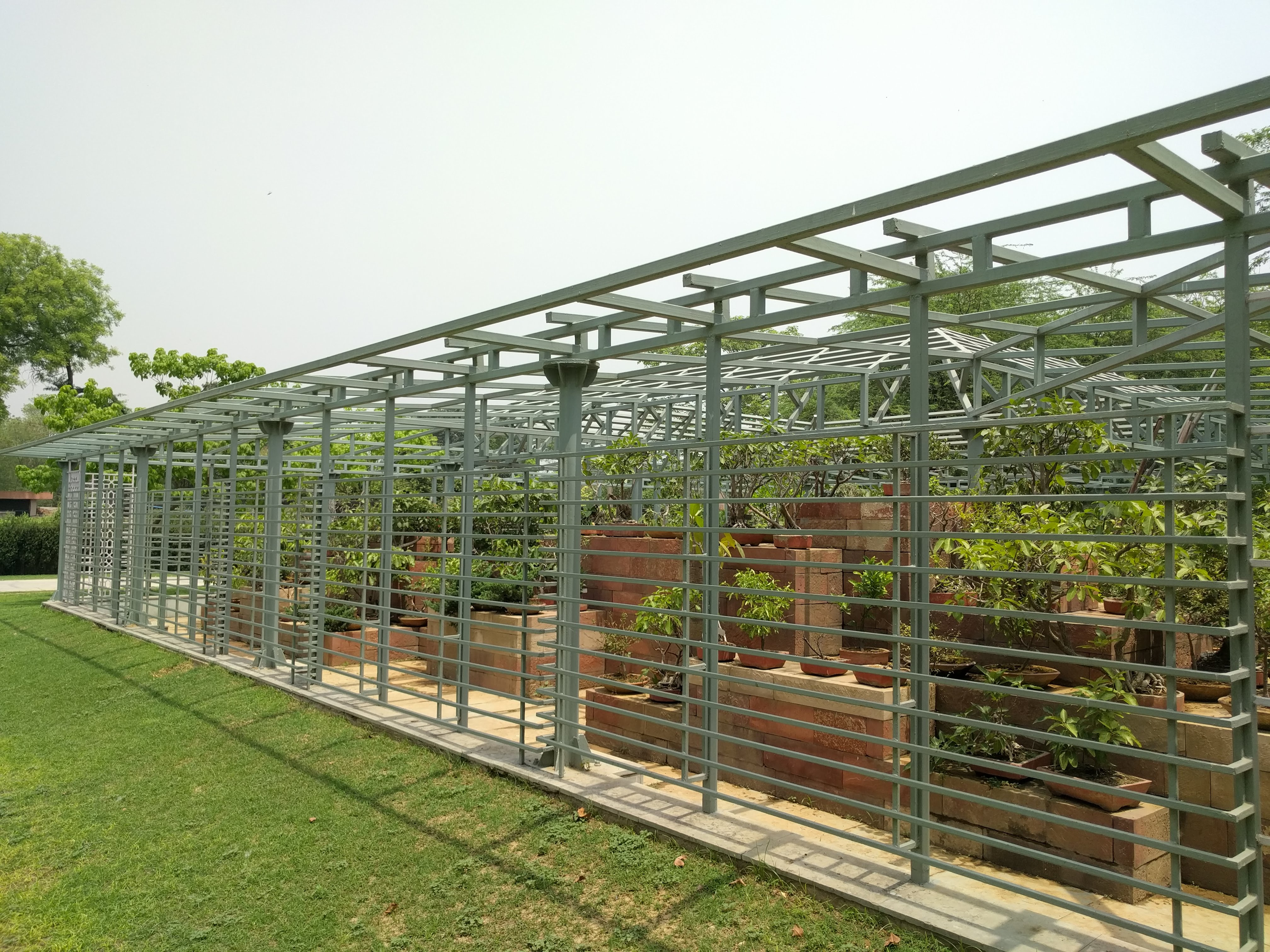
Bonsai houses

The area contains over 280 native tree species. Using GIS 4200 trees have been mapped. Apart from this there are around 80 types of bird species and 36 types of butterflies. The Bonsai House is home to some bonsai over 80 years old.

===== Trees =====
Sunder Nursery is Delhi's first arboretum. It is home to some rare trees such as a Pink Cedar (Acrocarpus fraxinifolius), the only one in Delhi. Various other trees in the nursery are also only found here and nowhere else in Delhi such as Chukka (Croton roxburghii) and Carrotwood (Cupaniopsis anacardioides).

A partial listing of trees and plants found:

- Amrood, Psidium guajava
- Peelu, Salvadora persica
- Sonjna, Moringa oleifera
- Marodphali, Fernandoa adenophylla
- Chalta, Dillenia indica
- Badminton Ball Tree, Parkia biglobosa
- Kaim, Mitragyna parvifolia
- Tun, Toona ciliata
- Siala, Markhamia lutea
- Pinj, Firmiana colorata
- Adusa, Adhatoda vasica
- Goolar, Ficus racemosa
- Brazilian ironwood, Caesalpinia ferrea
- Whistling pine, Casuarina equisetifolia
- Colville's glory, Colvillea racemosa
- Shisham, Dalbergia sissoo

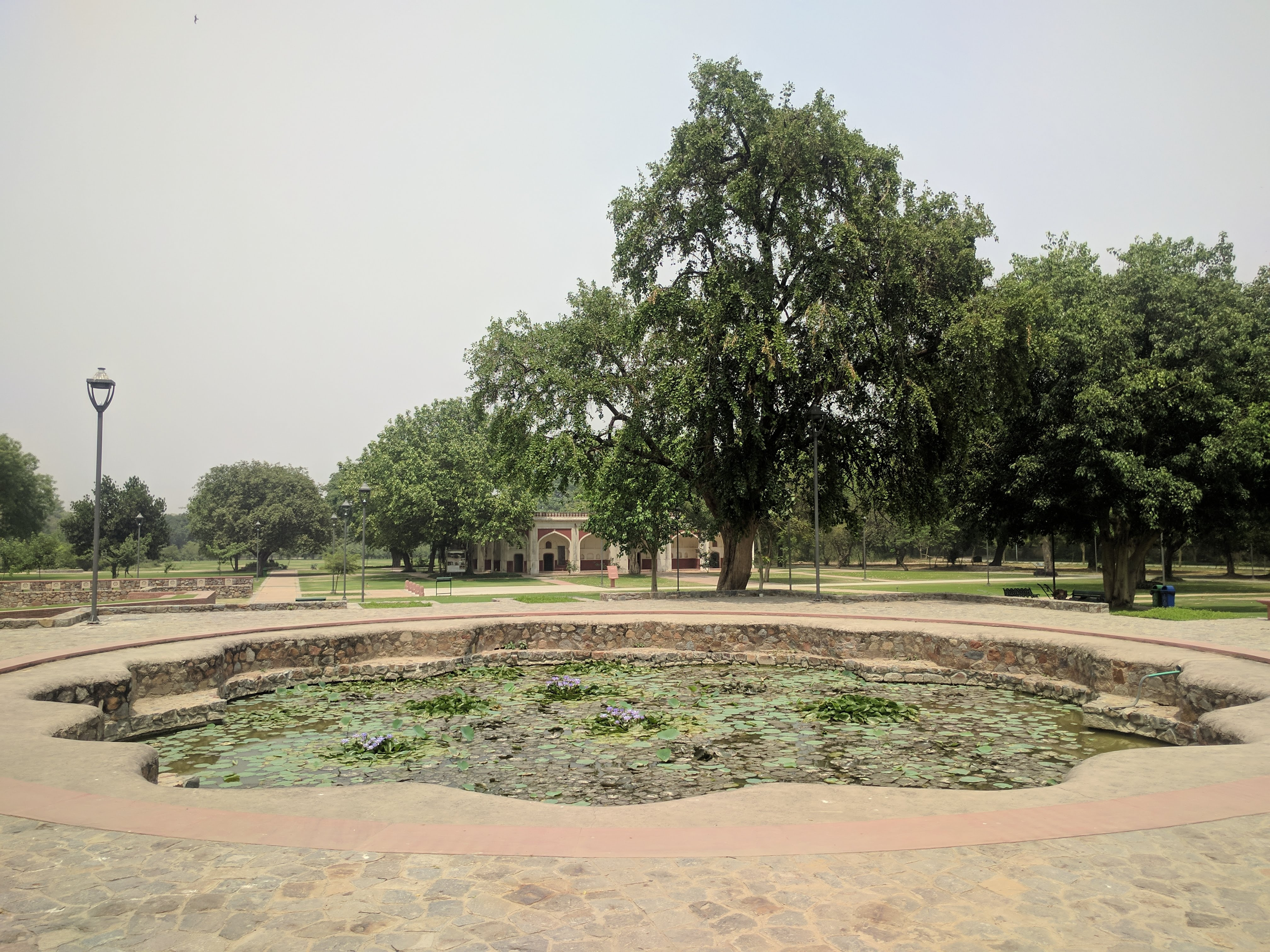
Mughal Lotus Pond, Sunder Nursery

===== Roses =====
The rose gardens host various types of roses. A partial list of rose varieties:

HT Roses

- Michael LIS
- Tata Pink
- Iceberg
- Black Pearl
- Oklahoma
- Bajazoo
- Charleston
- Pristine
- Gold Media
- Broadway
- BP Pal
- Christian Dior
- Folklore

Miniature Roses

- Don Don
- Merlin

==== Fauna ====
===== Birds =====
80 different species of birds have been located in the area through bird mapping. In 2014, the rare Ultramarine Flycatcher was spotted in the park area, a bird not seen in New Delhi for many years. 36 types of butterfly have also been spotted in the park. A partial listing of birds include:

- Asian Pied Starling
- Eurasian Golden Oriole
- Coppersmith Barbet
- Eurasian Collared Dove
- Laughing Dove
- Red-wattled Lapwing
- Indian Roller
- Asian Green Bee-eater
- Long-tailed shrike
- Black Drongo
- Indian Stone-curlew
- Eastern Cattle Egret
- Scaly-breasted Munia
- Red Avadavat
- Indian Pond Heron
- Grey-headed Canary-flycatcher
- Indian Silverbill
- Black-rumped Flameback
- Yellow-footed Green Pigeon
- Rufous Treepie
- Shikra
- Spotted Owlet
- Common Tailorbird
- Plum-headed Parakeet
- Ashy Prinia
- Oriental Magpie
- Red-breasted Flycatcher
- Black Redstart

===== Butterflies =====
A partial listing of butterfly varieties found:

- Yellow Pansy
- White Arab
- Tiny Grass Blue
- Indian Palm Bob
- Plain Tiger
- Pioneer
- Common Emigrant
- Blue Pansy
- Banded Awl
- Peacock Pansy
- Lemon Pansy
- Grass Yellow
- Common mime
- Common Gull
- Common Mormon

== Gallery ==
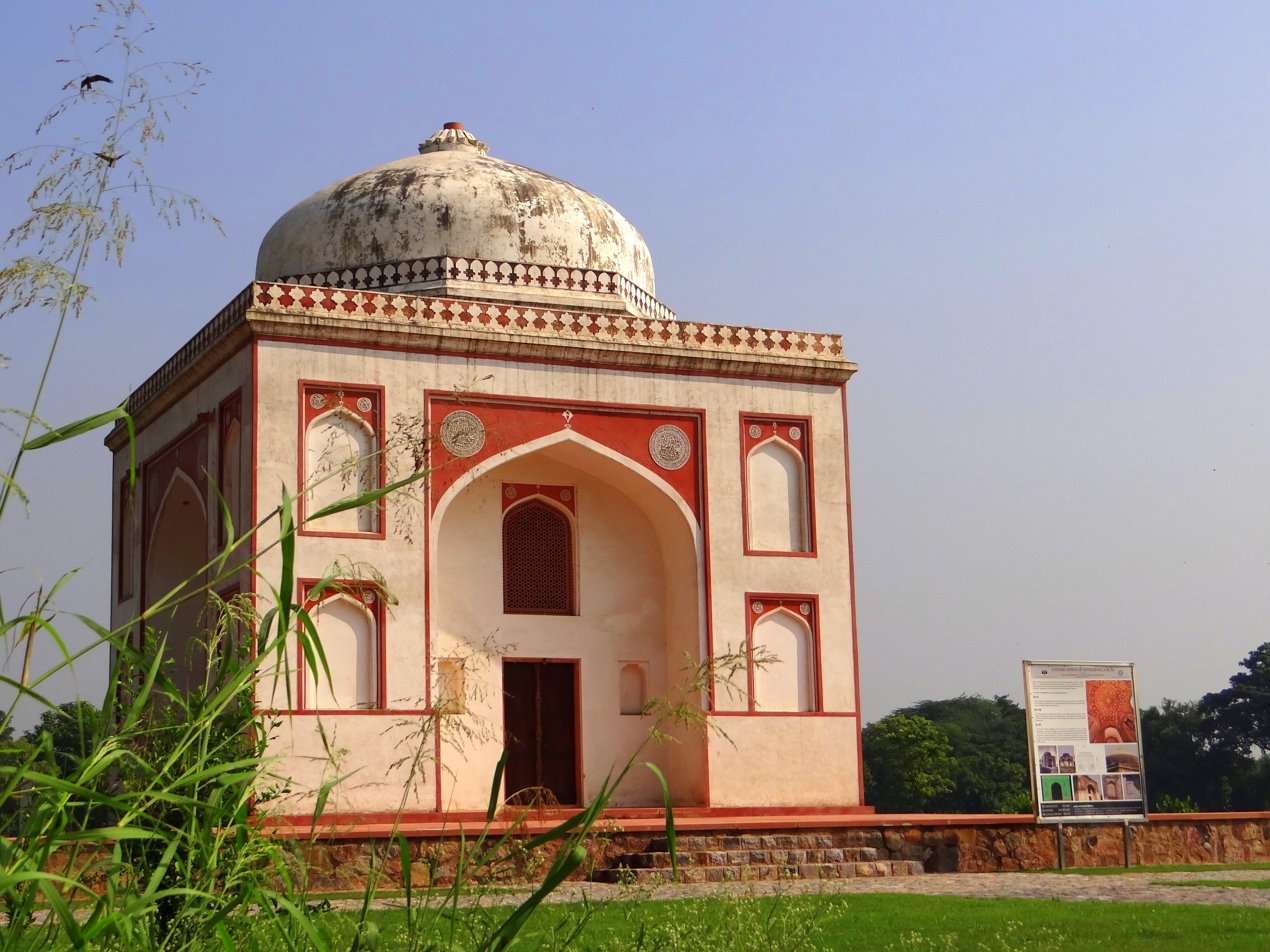
Sunderwala Burj

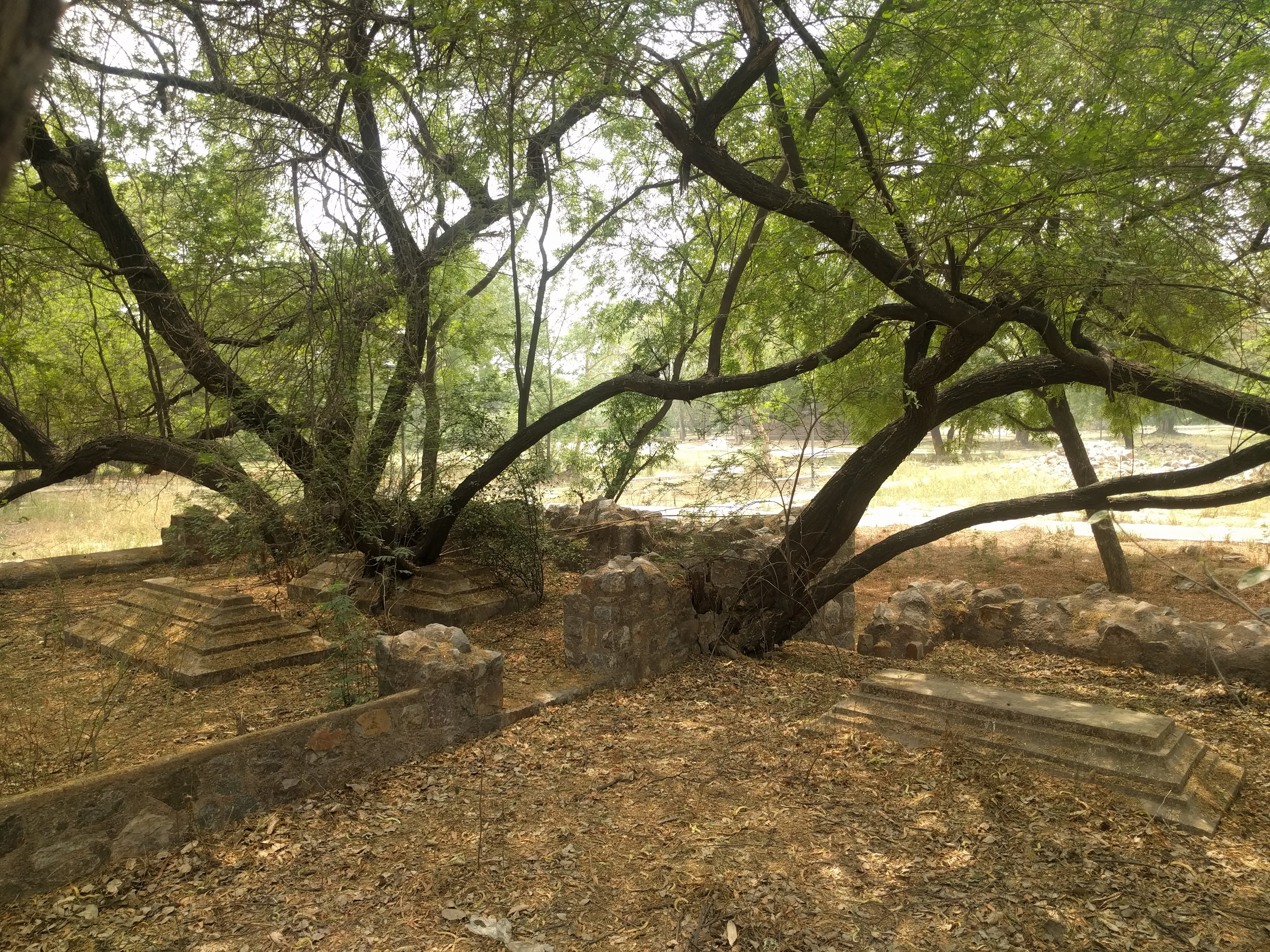
Unknown Mughal graves

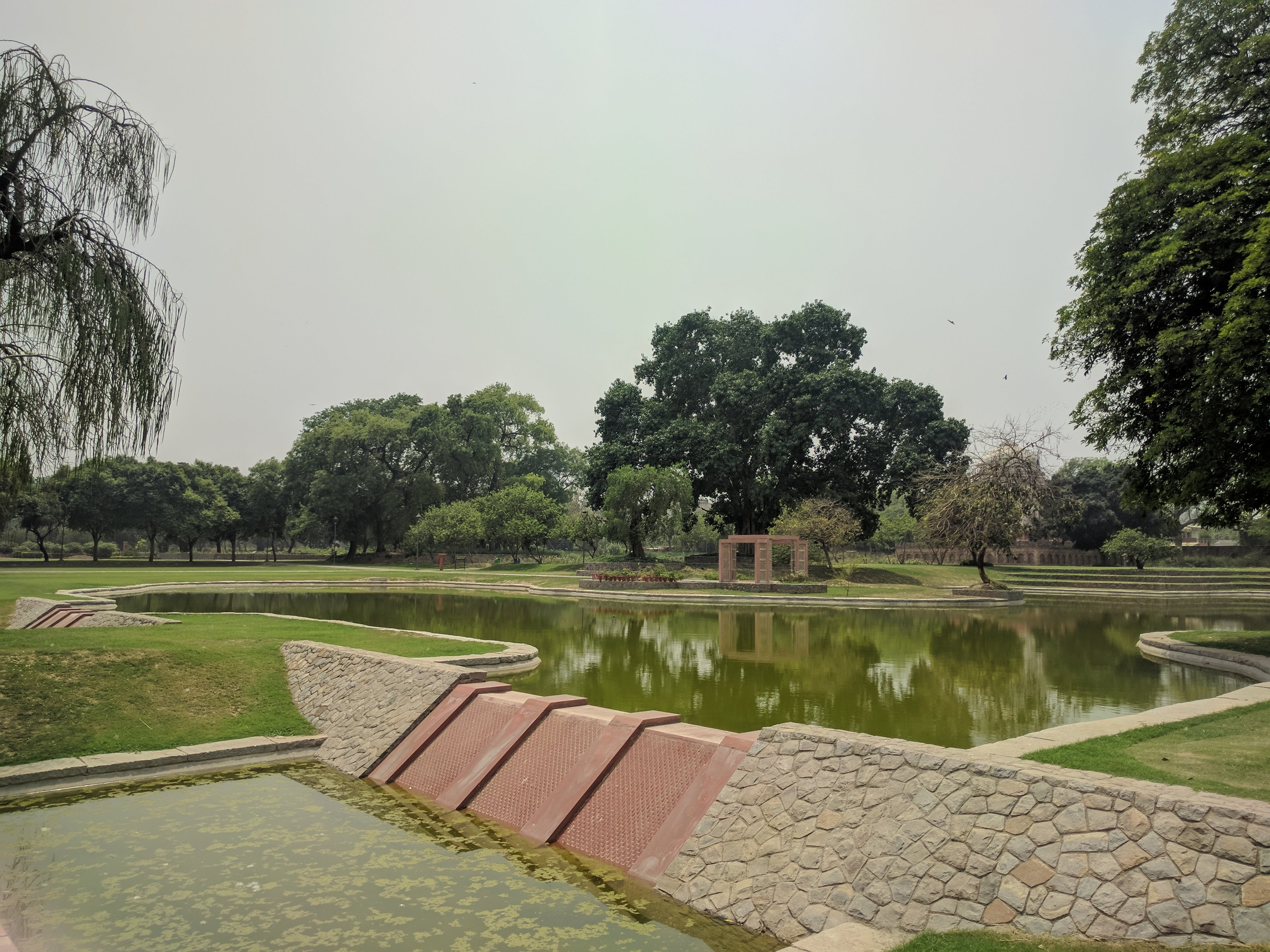
Artificial Lake

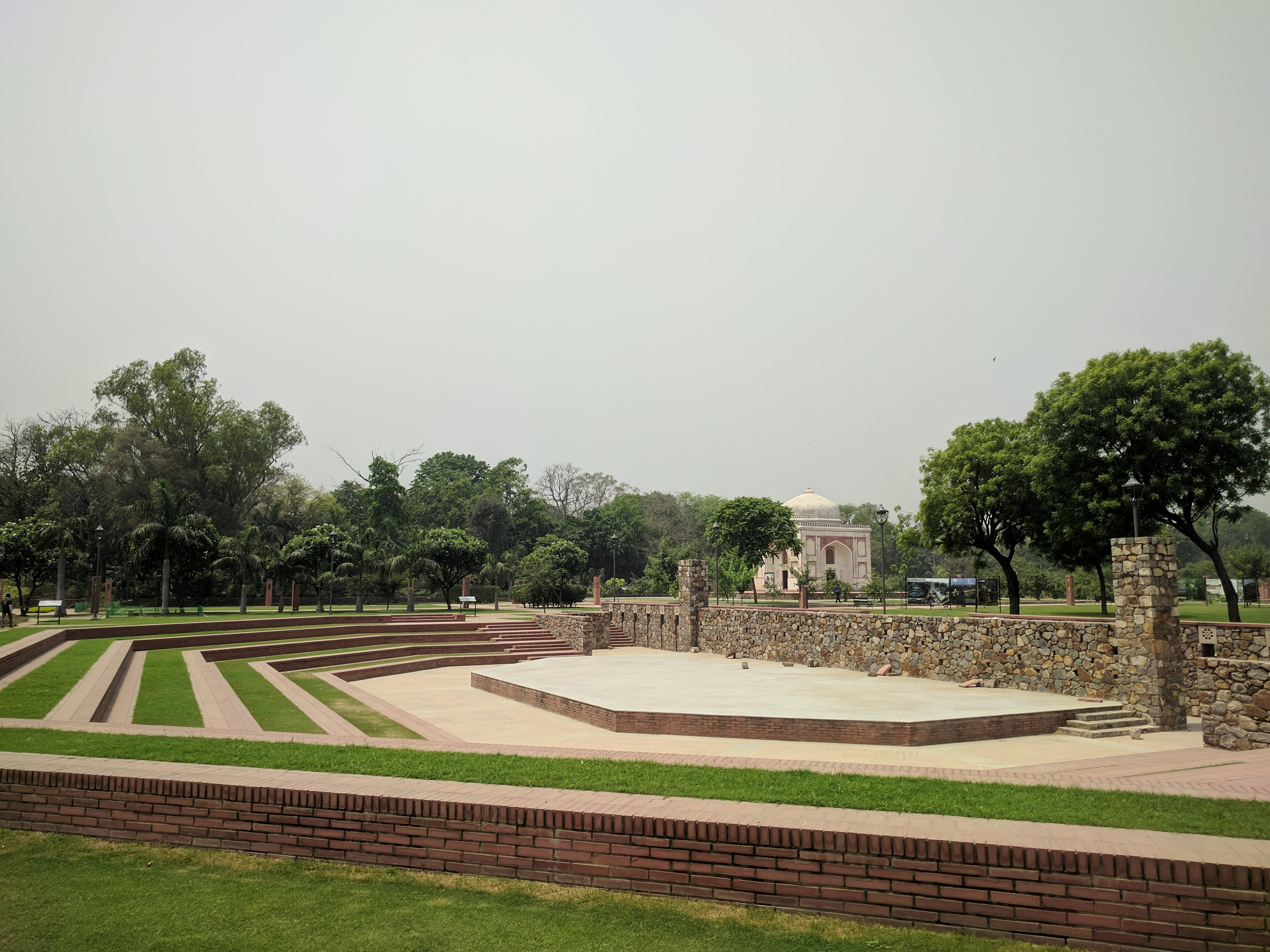
Amphitheatre, with Sunder Burj visible in the background

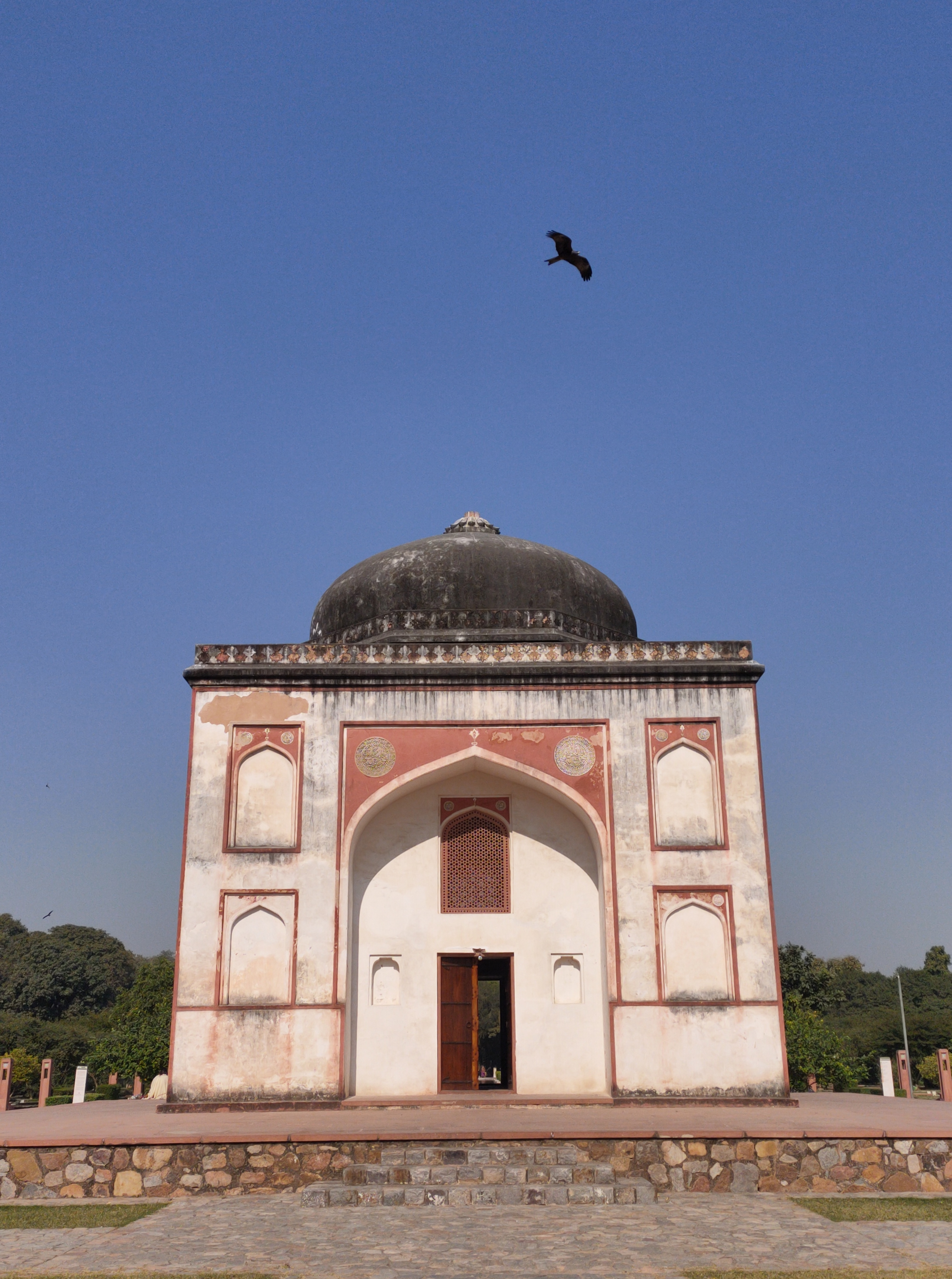
Sunder Burj, front view

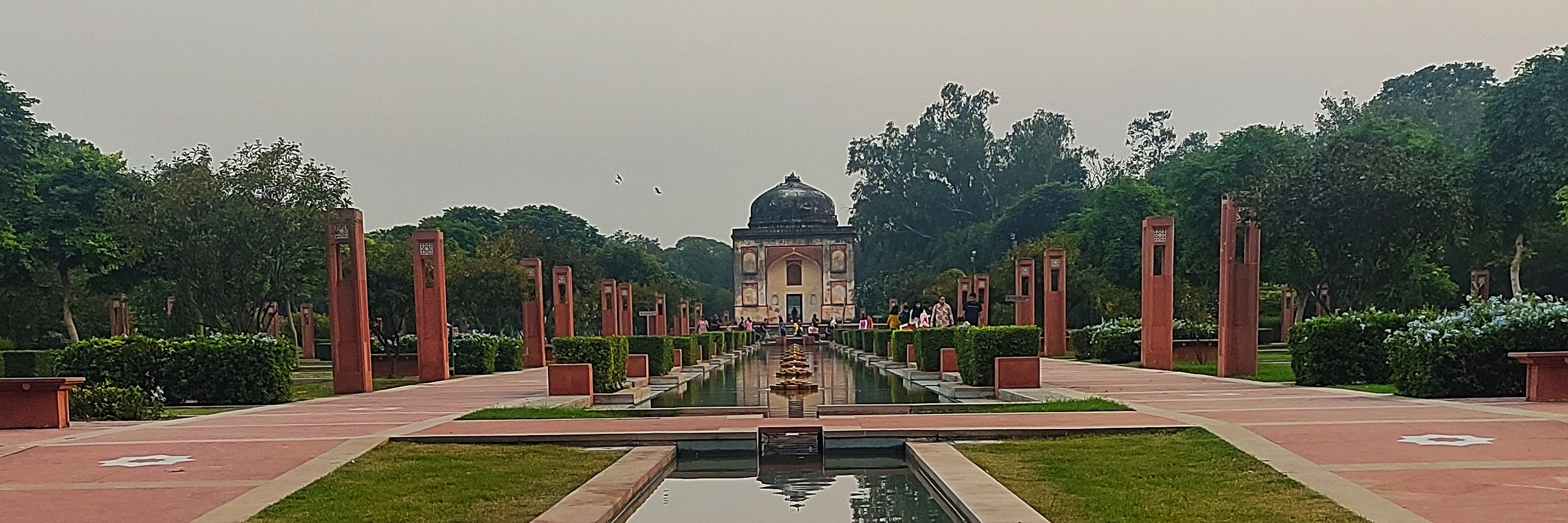
Panoramic view in the daylight

== See also ==
- Lodi Gardens
- List of parks in Delhi
