= Garden of Five Senses =

Park in Delhi, India

Coordinates: 28.513342°N 77.197993°E

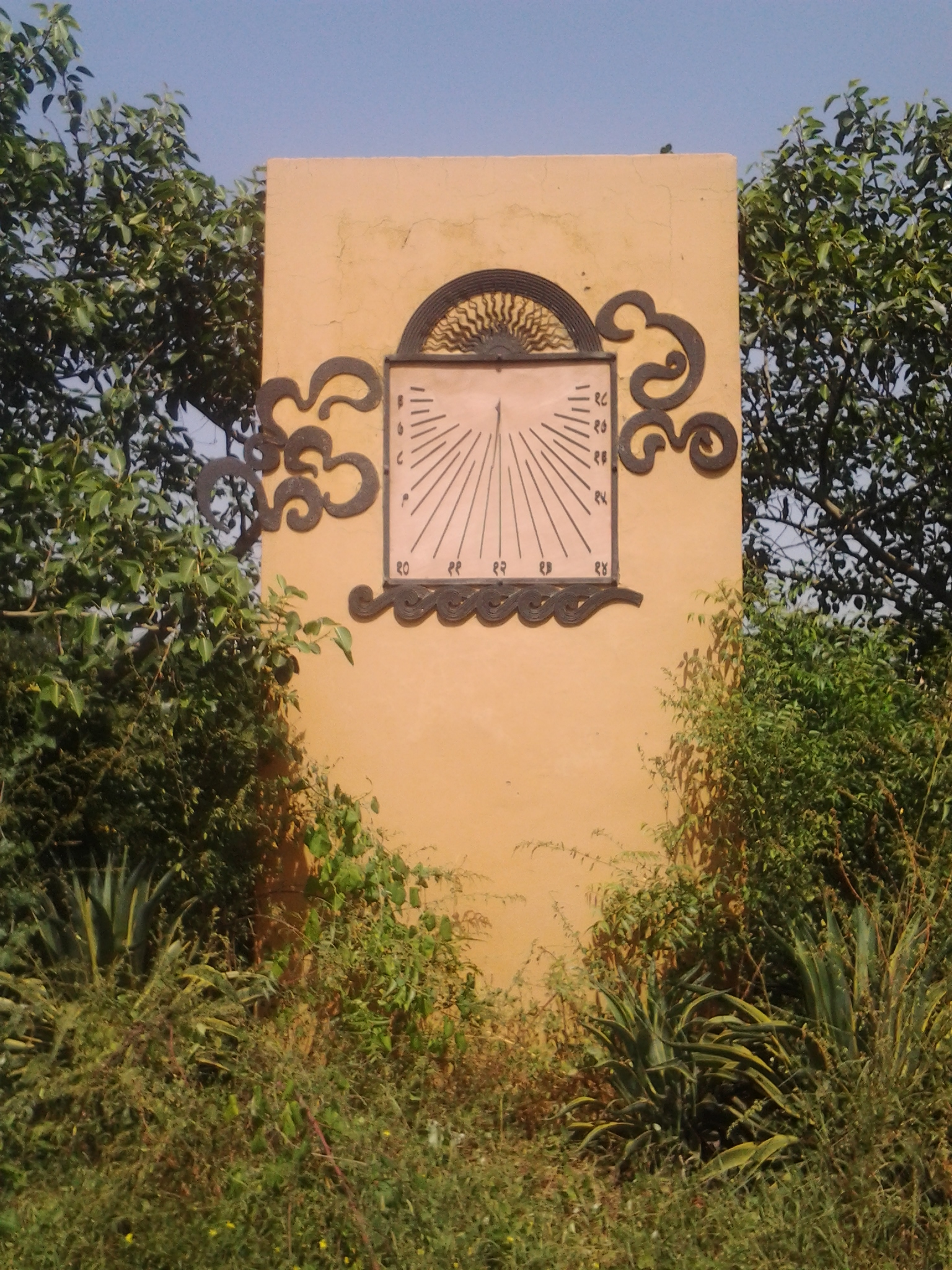
- Sun clock inside the garden
- Interactive map of Garden of Five Senses
- Type: Natural Area
- Location: Saidul Ajaib village, Saket, Delhi
- Nearest city: Saket
- Area: 20 acres (8.1 ha)
- Operator: Delhi Tourism
- Open: 9:00am–7:00pm (in Summer), 9:00am-6:00pm (in Winter)
- Status: Open

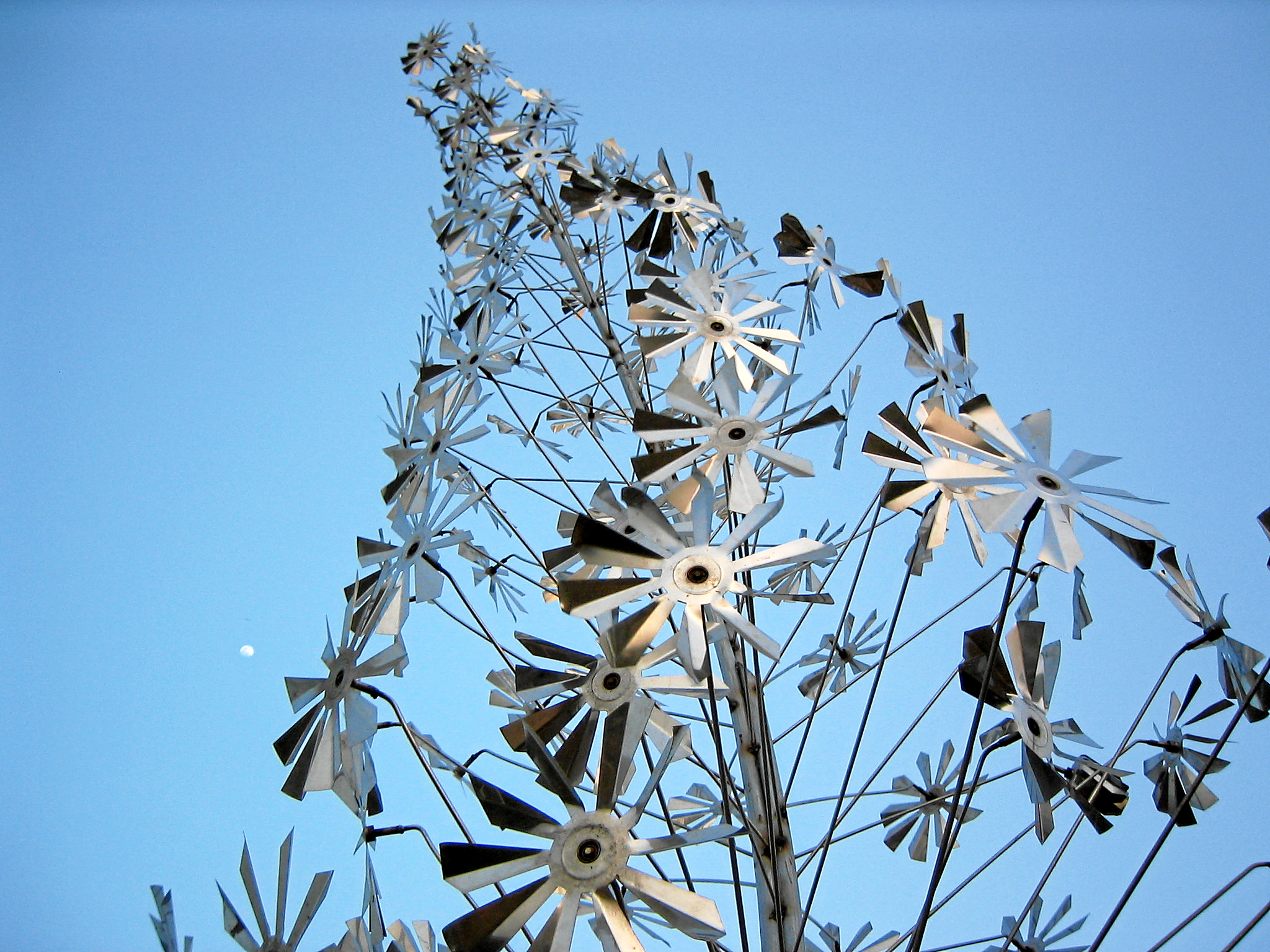
A Modern Art Sculpture in Garden of Five Senses, Delhi

The Garden of Five Senses is a park in Delhi, India. Spread over 20 acres, the park is located in Saidul Ajaib village, opposite Saket, near the Mehrauli heritage area. Designed by Delhi architect, Pradeep Sachdeva, the park was developed by Delhi Tourism and Transportation Development Corporation, Delhi at a cost of Rs 10 crore, over a period of three years and opened in February 2003. Partly built over a rocky terrain, the garden has various theme areas, including a section on the lines of Mughal Gardens, plus pools of water lilies, bamboo courts, herb gardens and solar energy park.

== Overview ==
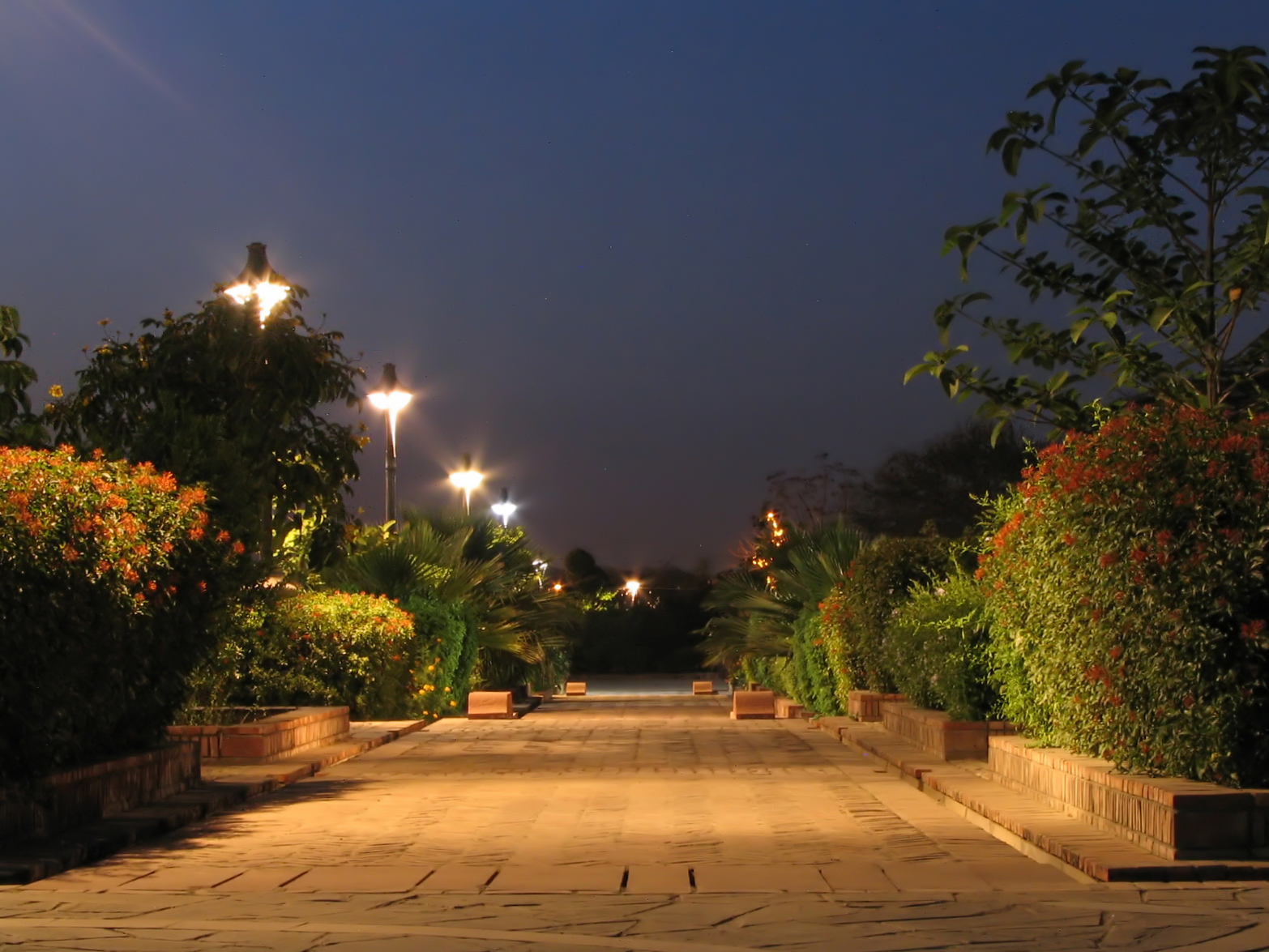
The Garden of Five Senses at night

Located just off the Mehrauli-Badarpur Road, in Said-Ul-Azaib village, close to the Mehrauli heritage area, The Garden of Five Senses is a park developed by Delhi Tourism Transportation Development Corporation. Inaugurated in February 2003, the garden is designed to stimulate the senses with its beauty and attractions and allow visitors to touch, smell, hear and see their natural surroundings. The garden serves as one of the prominent cultural venues of the capital, as programmes are organized here round the year. The Garden tourism festival (February), food festivals, different melas, Dandiya festivals and other cultural programs are held here at different times.

Presently, the Garden of Five Senses is managed by Sh. V K Jatav, Chief Manager, DTTDC.

In August 2005, Delhi Tourism and Transportation Development Corporation Limited (DTTDC) signed an agreement with ITE India Pvt Ltd for operating 31 commercial food and craft outlets for 10 years at the Garden of Five Senses, as a result the park also has several restaurants, and liquor serving bars.

Every year, the Delhi Government also organises Garden Tourism Festival at the Garden of Five Senses.

== Replica of the Mexican Mayan Labná Arc ==
As the relations between India and Mexico are warming up, India has recently unveiled a replica of the Labná Arch at Garden of Five Senses in Delhi as a goodwill gesture. The arch was built by the millenary culture of the Mayans located in Yucatán, Mexico and built in the Late and Terminal Classic era. A date corresponding to AD 862 is inscribed in the palace.

The Labná Arch in the Garden of the Five Senses in Delhi was inaugurated on 16 September 2013 by the Mayoress of Delhi, Madame Sheila Dikshit and the Mexican Ambassador Jaime Nualart. The replica constructed by Indian National Trust for Art and Cultural Heritage, was made with stone from Rajasthan, similar to the stone found in the Puuc region of Yucatán, and worked by expert Indian stonecutters. The project was initiated by Julio Faesler-Carlisle, Mexican Ambassador to India (2001–2004)and entirely funded by private enterprises, three Indian and three Mexican. The Arch will serve as a venue for cultural events.

== Gallery ==
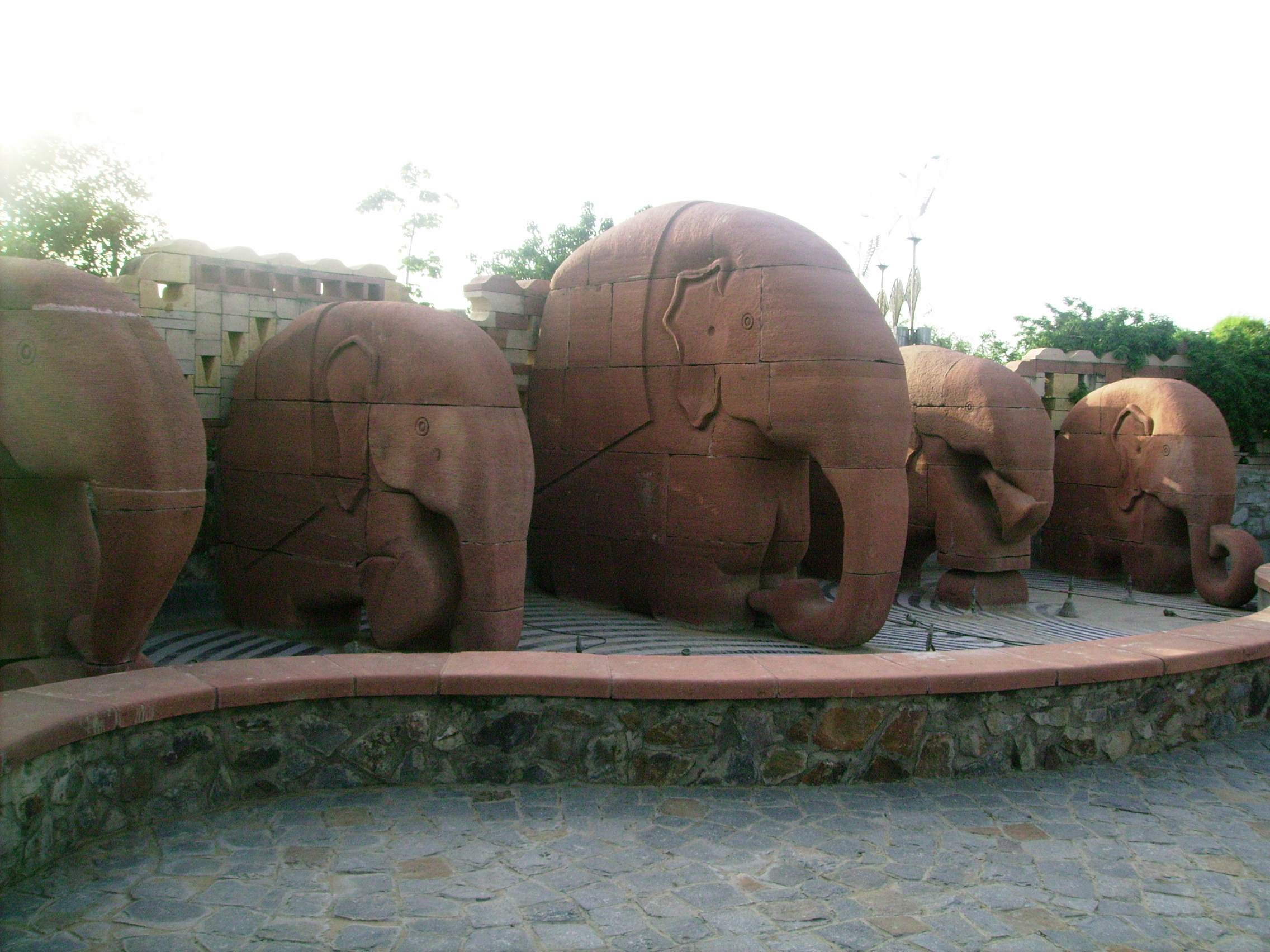
Elephants

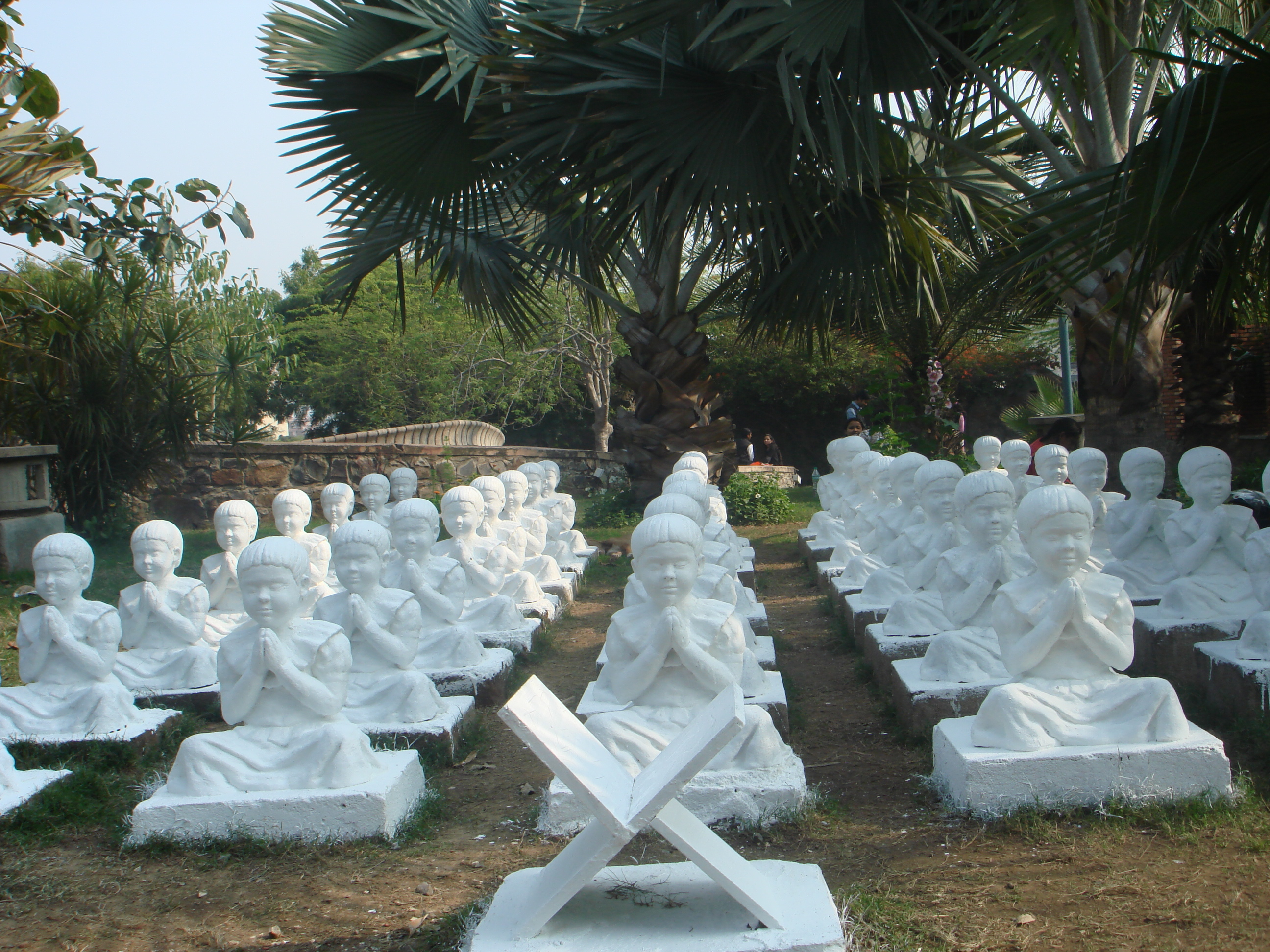
Children praying

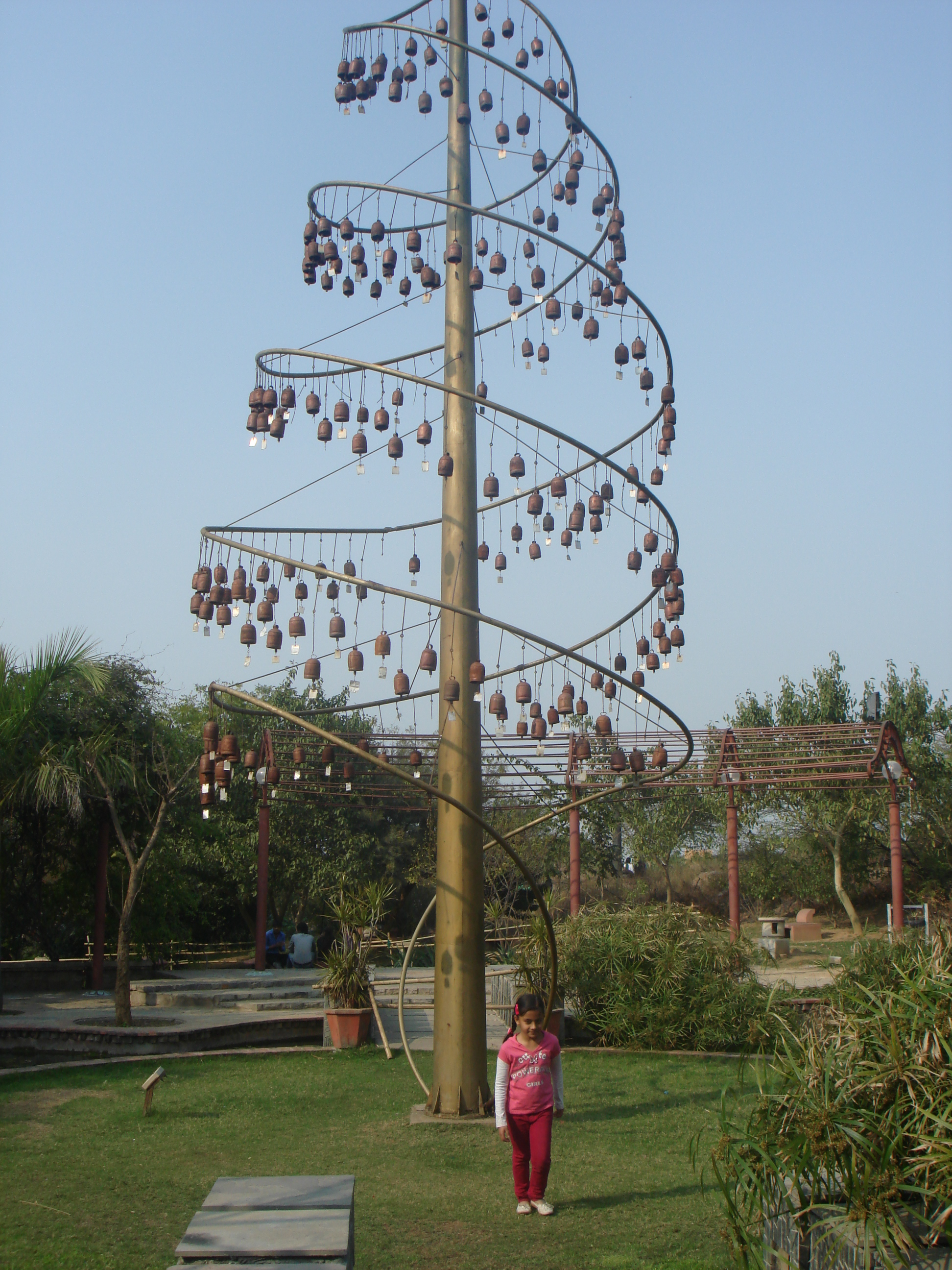
Bell tree

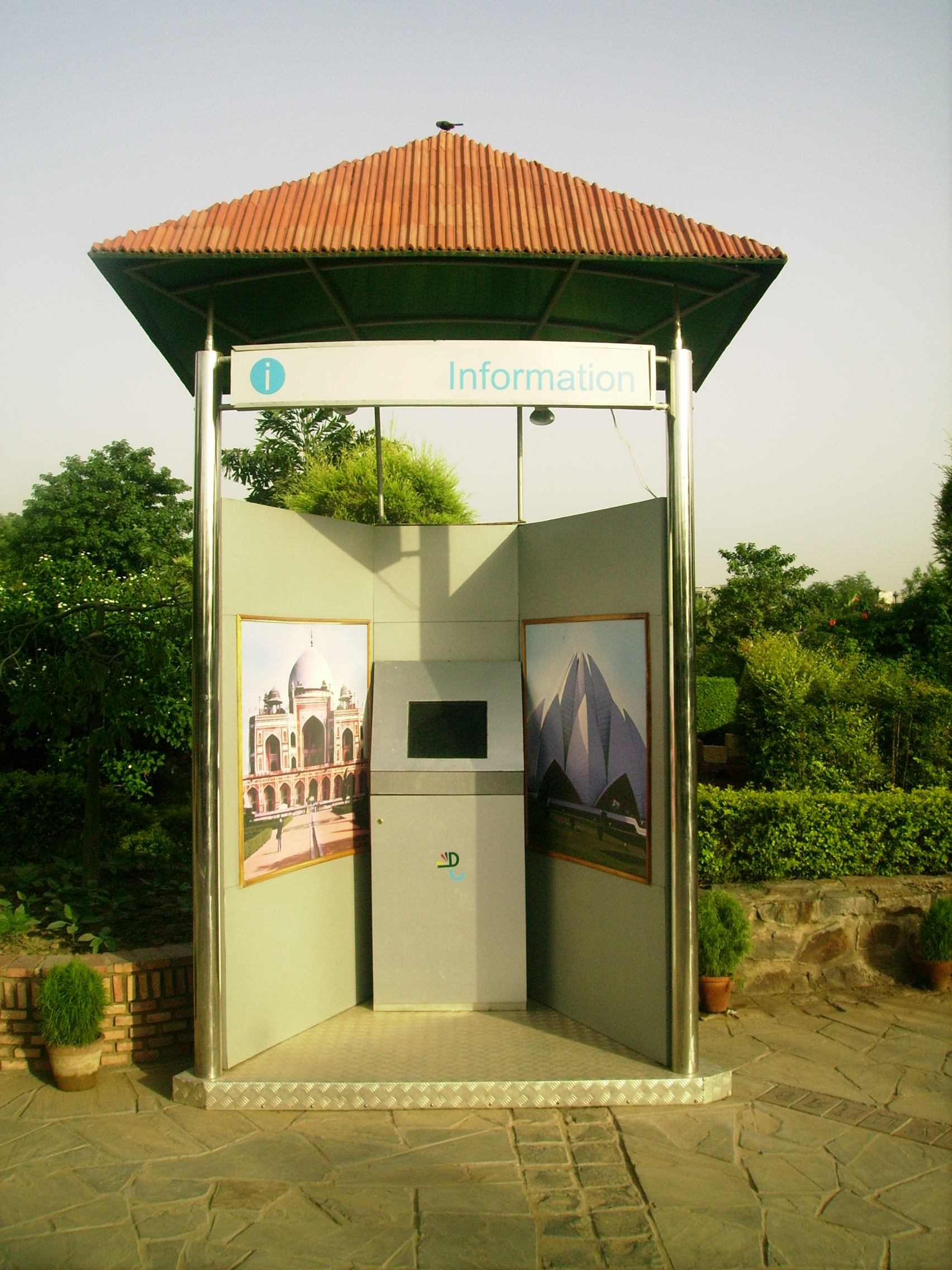
A Delhi Tourism information booth

== See also ==
- List of parks in Delhi
