= Nehru Park, Delhi =

Park in Chanakyapuri, New Delhi, India

A concert of Manna Dey at Nehru Park

Nehru Park is a large park situated in the Chanakyapuri Diplomatic Enclave of New Delhi. Named after India's first Prime Minister, Jawaharlal Nehru, the park is spread over an area of 80 acres (320,000 m^{2}), close to the heart of the city, and was established in 1969. Its foundation stone was laid by Prime Minister Lal Bahadur Shastri, in 1965 in memory of the recently deceased Nehru.

It is today one of city leading green areas, and a venue for 'Morning Ragas and Evening Ragas Concerts, as part of the "Music in the Park" concerts organized by NDMC, New Delhi Municipal Council, SPIC MACAY music concerts and the annual 'Bhakti Festival'. Apart from this it is a regular venue for art events, morning yoga classes, and houses an ancient Shiv Temple. The park is one of the most famous landmarks of New Delhi and a beautiful place to hang out during a sunny winter afternoon in New Delhi. An absolute must see for anyone visiting the city.

The Park has a life size alloy statue of Vladimir Lenin the leader of the Great October Socialist Revolution of Russia. The statue was installed on Ist November 1987 during the 70th anniversary of October Revolution. It was unveiled by then Soviet Premier Nikolai Ryzhkov, Indian Prime-minister Rajiv Gandhi and his wife Sonia Gandhi. Every year on 22 April members of Communist Party of India (Marxist) and other Left oriented Political parties visits the place to commemorate the Birth Anniversary of Lenin.>>

== See also ==
- List of parks in Delhi
