= List of parks in Delhi =

This is a list of parks in Delhi in the National Capital Region.

Many of these parks are maintained by the Delhi Development Authority. Some of the park which are home to historic monuments are under the jurisdiction of the Archaeological Survey of India. Other parks, such as Sunder Nursery and Park, are run through a public-private partnership model.

== List of parks in Delhi ==
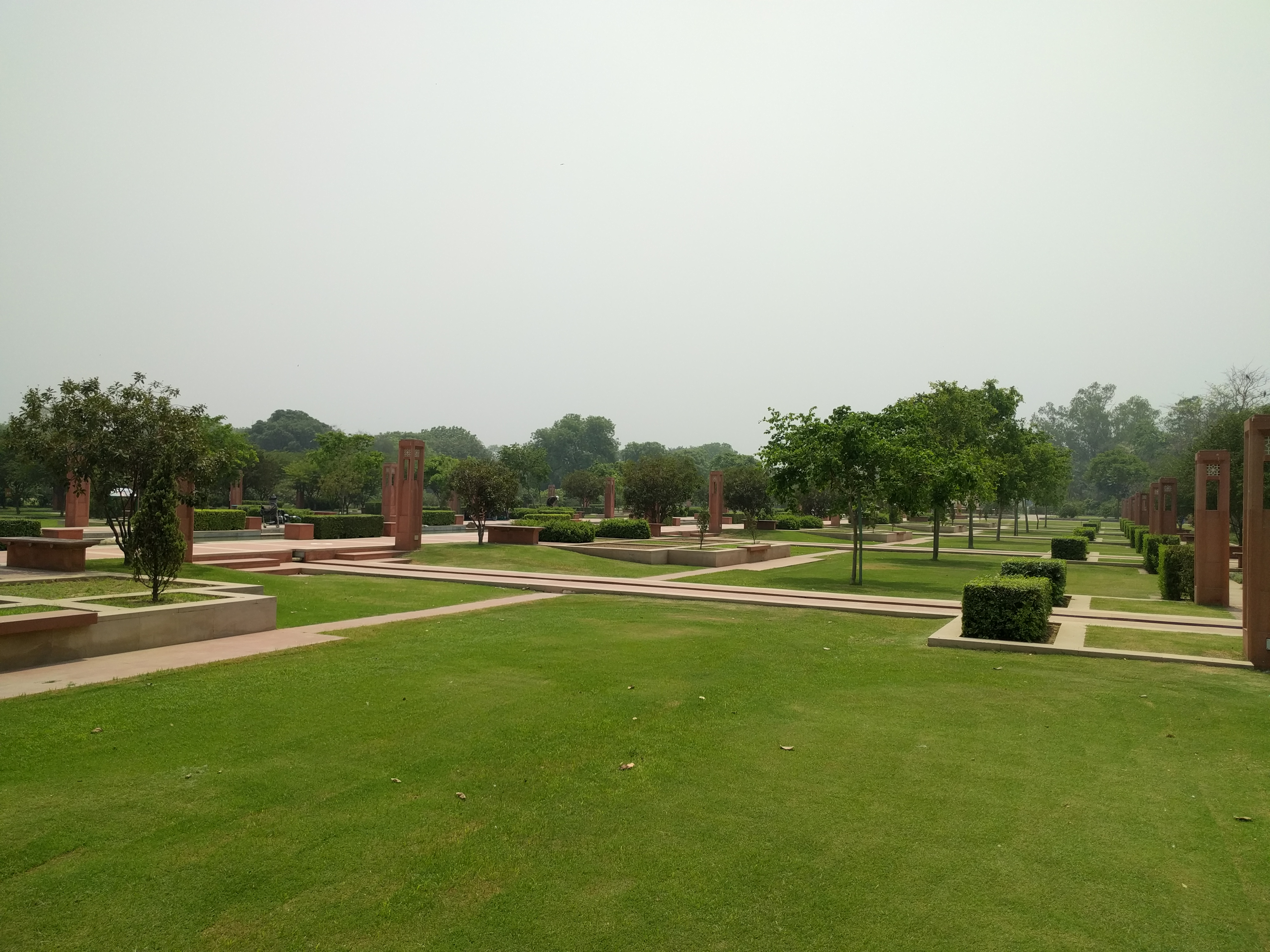
Sunder Nursery

- Aastha Kunj
- Lodi Gardens
- Mehrauli Archaeological Park
- Charti Lal Goel Heritage Park, Old Delhi
- Central Park, Connaught Place
- Delhi Ridge
  - Northern Ridge
    - Pusa Hill Forest
    - Talkatora Gardens
    - Tri Cord Park
    - Northern Ridge biodiversity park
  - Central Ridge
    - Buddha Jayanti Park, on Central Ridge
    - Neela Hauz biodiversity park, on Central Ridge
  - South-Central Ridge
    - Aravalli Biodiversity Park
    - Deer Park
    - Garden of Five Senses
    - Hauz Khas Complex
    - Jahanpanah City Forest
    - Neela Hauz Biodiversity Park
    - Sanjay Van
  - Southern Ridge
    - Asola Bhatti Wildlife Sanctuary
    - Mangar Bani forest
    - Tilpath Valley Biodiversity Park
- Gulmohar Park
- Lake Park-Sanjay Park
- Mughal Gardens
- Nehru Park, Delhi
- Nihal Vihar Park
- Roshanara Bagh
- Sahibi River bank
  - Chhawla or Najafgarh drain city forest
  - Najafgarh drain bird sanctuary
- Shalimar Bagh (Sheesh Mahal Garden)
- Swarn Jayanti Park Rohini
- Yamuna river bank
  - 2010 Commonwealth Games Village, includes KD Jadhav Wrestling Stadium and Indira Gandhi Arena
  - 9 Number Park Okhla
  - Amrut Biodiversity Park
  - Asita Park, on western bank
  - Asita East Park, on eastern bank
  - Baansera Park
  - Chhath Ghat
  - DK Swarn Jayanyti Udhyan (DK Golden Jubliee Park)
  - Indraprasht Park
  - Kalindi Kunj Park
  - Lalita Park
  - National Zoological Park Delhi
  - Netaji Subhash Park
  - Okhla Head Park
  - Okhla Sanctuary
  - Shashtri Park
  - Shyam Ghat
  - Sonia Vihar Water Sports Club
  - Central Park (Sunder Nursery)
  - Raj Ghat and associated memorials, includes Shanti Van and Vijay Ghat
  - Tilpat Park
  - Usmanpur Forest
  - Waste To Wonder Park, Seven wonder Park, Saraikale Khan
  - Yamuna biodiversity park
  - Yamuna Vatika
  - Ajmal Khan Park

== See also ==
- List of Monuments of National Importance in Delhi
- List of tourist attractions in Delhi
- Transport in Delhi
