= Saidul Ajaib =

Saidul Ajaib Said-ul-Ajaib
- city
- Location in India
- Coordinates: 28.5549°N 77.1919°E
- Country: India
- State: Delhi
- District: South

Population (2001)
  - Total: 14,075

Languages
  - Official: Hindi, English
- Time zone: UTC+5:30 (IST)

Said-ul-Ajaib is a census town in South district in the Indian state of Delhi. Today it is most known for the Garden of Five Senses park developed by Delhi Tourism. A large number of PGs have sprung up due to its proximity to Saket metro station and Saket. It is situated on Mehrauli Badarpur Road and Ignou Main Road passes through it. Paryavaran Complex, Freedom Fighter Enclave and Sainik Farms are in this area.

A favourite noble of Firoz Shah Tughlaq, the chief of chamberlains and a follower of the Sufi tradition — these are among the few things known about the man after whom Saidulajab is named. According to historians, the khanqah (a structure meant for Sufi gatherings) of 14th Century noble Sayyid-ul-Hujjab Maruf existed in the area where the village now stands. Over the centuries, the word Hujjab was corrupted, first becoming ajaib and then ajab.

Archaeologist Maulvi Zafar Hasan, Maruf is described as a “favourite noble of Firoz Shah (Tughlaq) enjoying the rank and title of Malik Sayyidul Hujjab.” “Both he and his father, Khuaja Wahid Quraishi, were disciples of Shaikh Nizamuddin, and Firoz Shah conferred great favours upon him, and held such a high opinion of his sagacity that he always consulted him in the affairs of the country. He enjoyed royal favours and confidence until his death,” he wrote. An urban village which has Qutub Minar on one side and Saket on the other, Saidulajaib is now known for The Garden of Five Senses and Champa Gali, with its design studios, chic cafes and handicraft stores.

== Demographics ==
As of 2001 India census, Said-ul-Ajaib had a population of 14,075. Males constitute 60% of the population and females 40%. Saidul Ajaib has an average literacy rate of 67%, higher than the national average of 59.5%: male literacy is 74%, and female literacy is 55%. In Saidul Ajaib, 15% of the population is under 6 years of age.
