= Shanti Stupa, Delhi =

Buddhist monument and tourist place in Delhi, India

Coordinates: 28°36′08.6″N 77°15′12.4″E

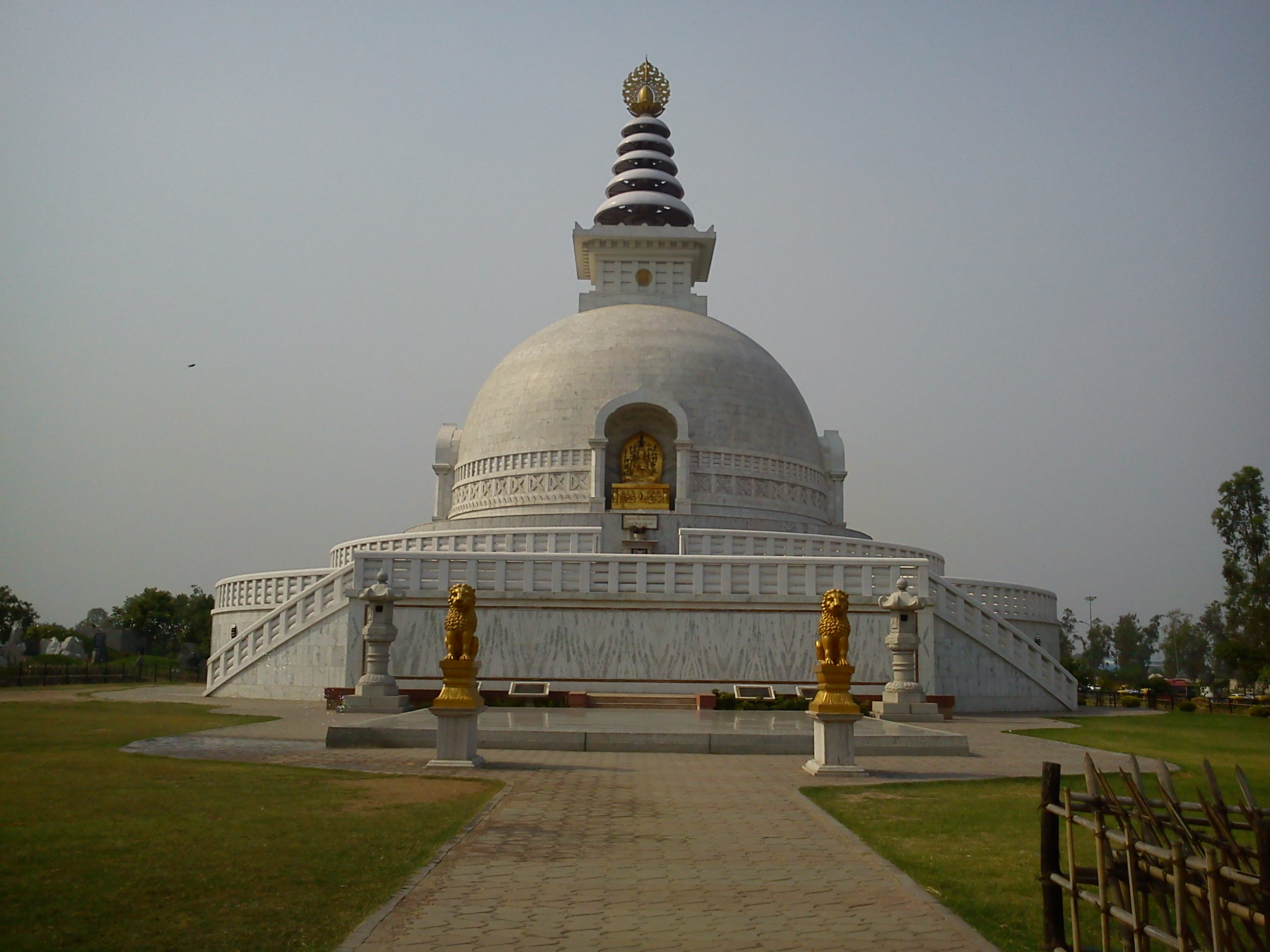
Shanti Stupa in Delhi, India

Shanti Stupa is a Buddhist monument in Delhi, India, intended as "a symbol of universal brotherhood and peace." It is one of several Peace Pagodas in the world. Started by the Nipponzan-Myōhōji-Daisanga religious order of Buddhism, it was inaugurated by the Dalai Lama on 4 November 2007.

== Description ==
Shanti Stupa measures 30 m (98 ft) in height and 37 m (121 ft) in diameter.

== History ==
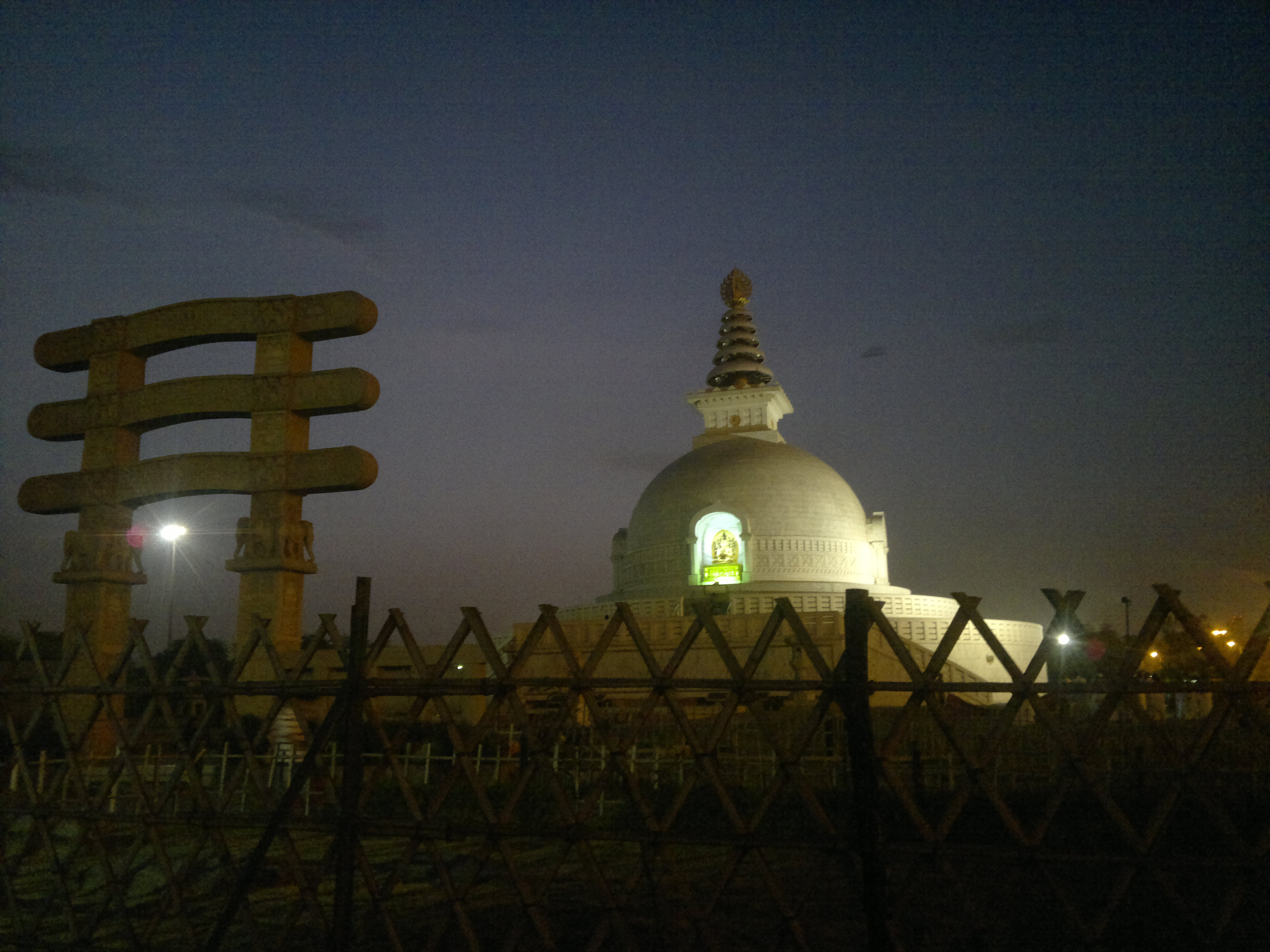
Buddhist sculpture standing in front of Shanti Stupa in the capital city of India

Shanti Stupa opened on 14 November 2007 in the city of Delhi near Humayun's Tomb, though earlier plans were to construct the stupa at Buddha Jayanti Park. It features a Japanese garden surrounding it. Buddhist monk Nichidatsu Fujii of the Nipponzan-Myōhōji-Daisanga religious order originally planned the erection of Shanti Stupa with independent India's first prime minister Jawaharlal Nehru. Starting in 2004 in collaboration with the Delhi Development Authority and the Lieutenant Governor of Delhi, three years were spent on the construction of Shanti Stupa.

The Dalai Lama inaugurated the stupa. Indian dignitaries at the inauguration ceremony included Akhlaqur Rahman Kidwai, governor of Haryana; Murlidhar Chandrakant Bhandare, governor of Orissa; Tejendra Khanna, Lieutenant Governor of Delhi; Mikhail Gorbachev, former president of the Union of Soviet Socialist Republics; and Dinesh Rai, Vice Chairman of the Delhi Development Authority. Several Buddhist monks and nuns participated as well. During the liturgy, Sheila Dikshit, the Chief Minister of Delhi, proclaimed: "We are all proud that Lord Buddha was born in this great country and his message of peace and compassion has become universal and has timeless relevance". The 14th Dalai Lama Tenzin Gyatso blessed the Shanti Stupa, hoping that it "would encourage the spread of the message of universal peace and brotherhood, which he said lies at the core of Buddhism."

The Shanti Stupa receives 2.5 million visitors every year. Around 80 other such Peace Pagodas built by the Nipponzan-Myōhōji-Daisanga religious order exist.

== Gallery ==
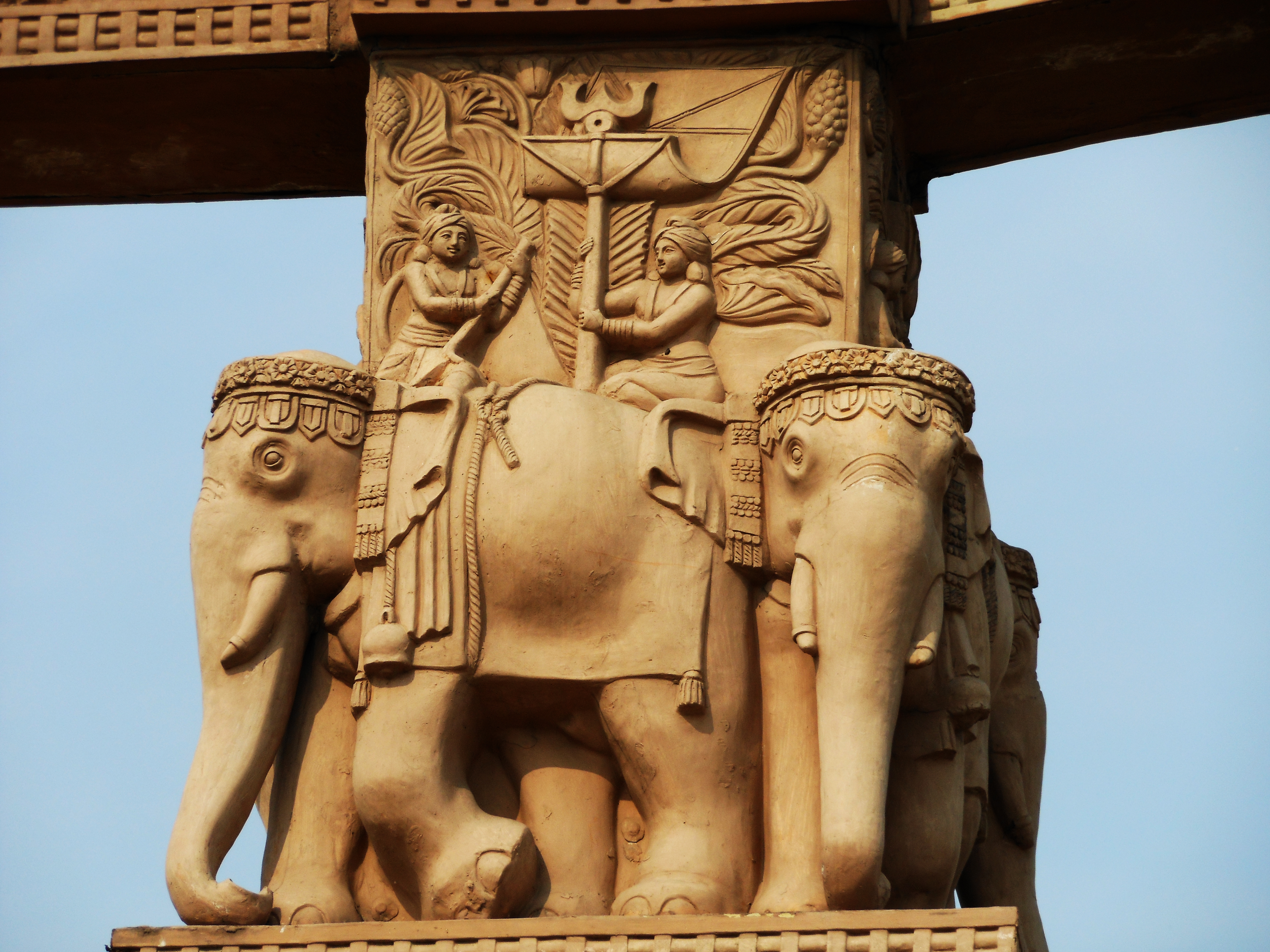
Sculpture at the gate of Shanti Stupa

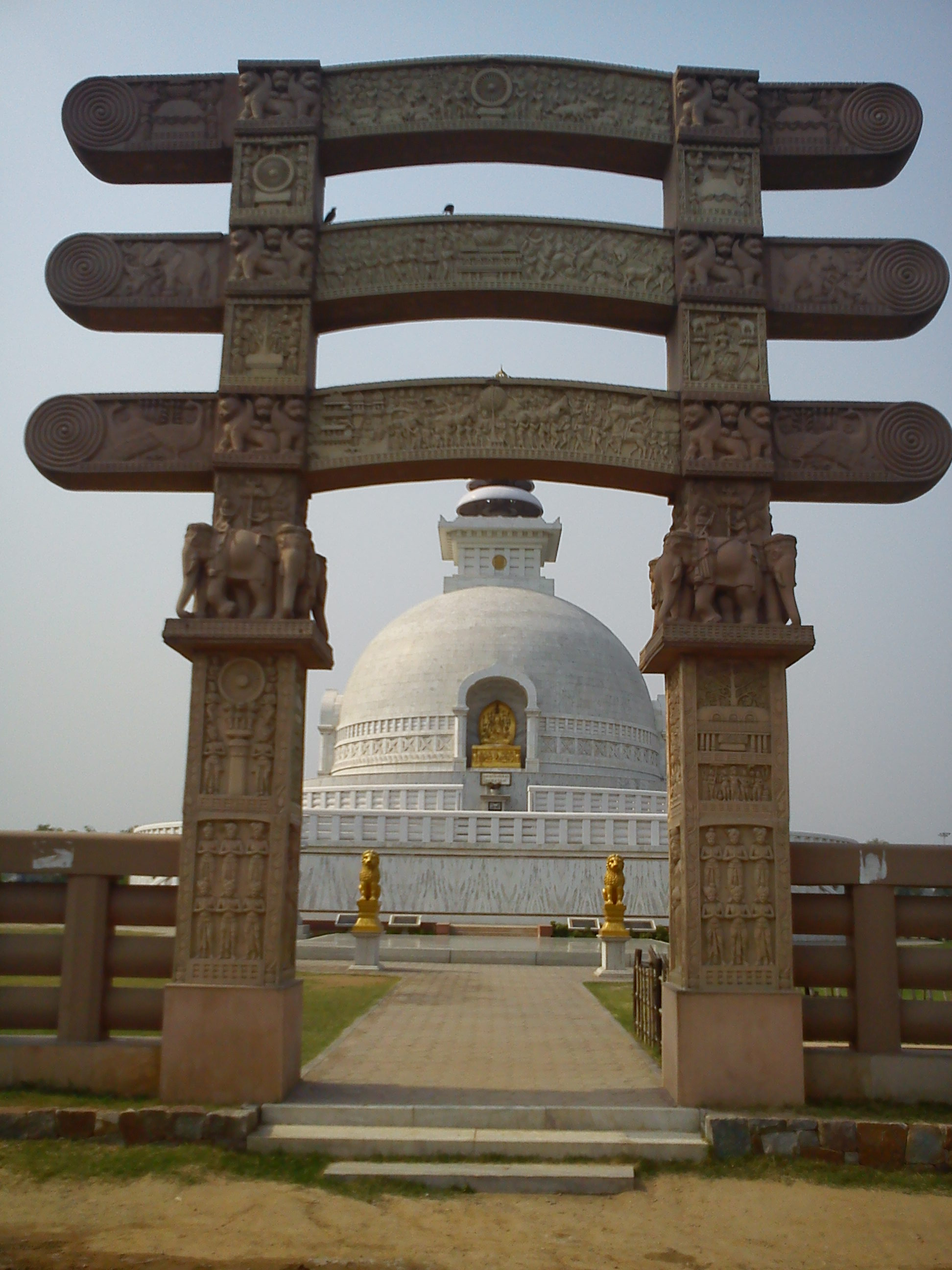
Pagoda at Shanti Stupa

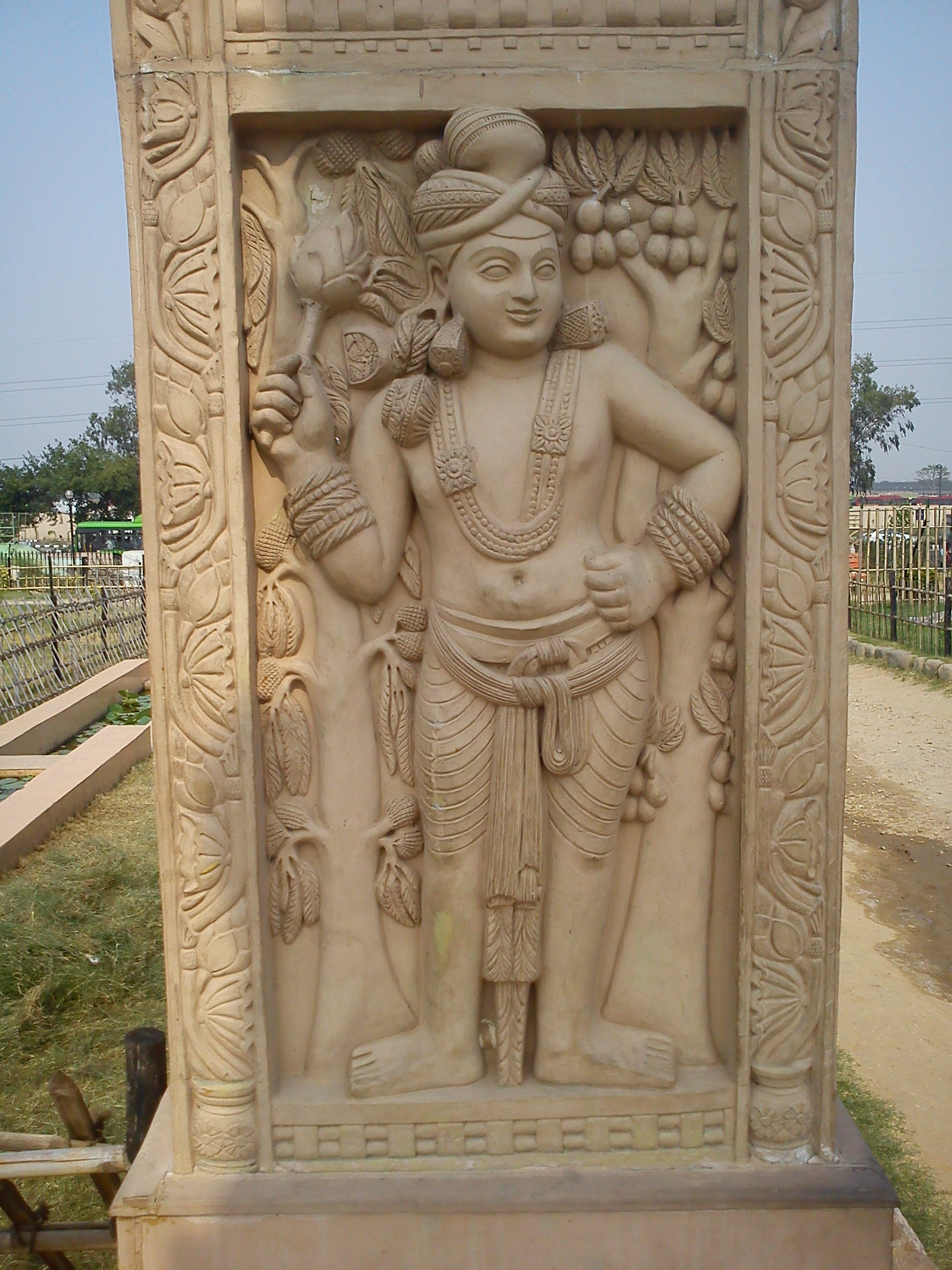
Murti of the Buddha at Shanti Stupa

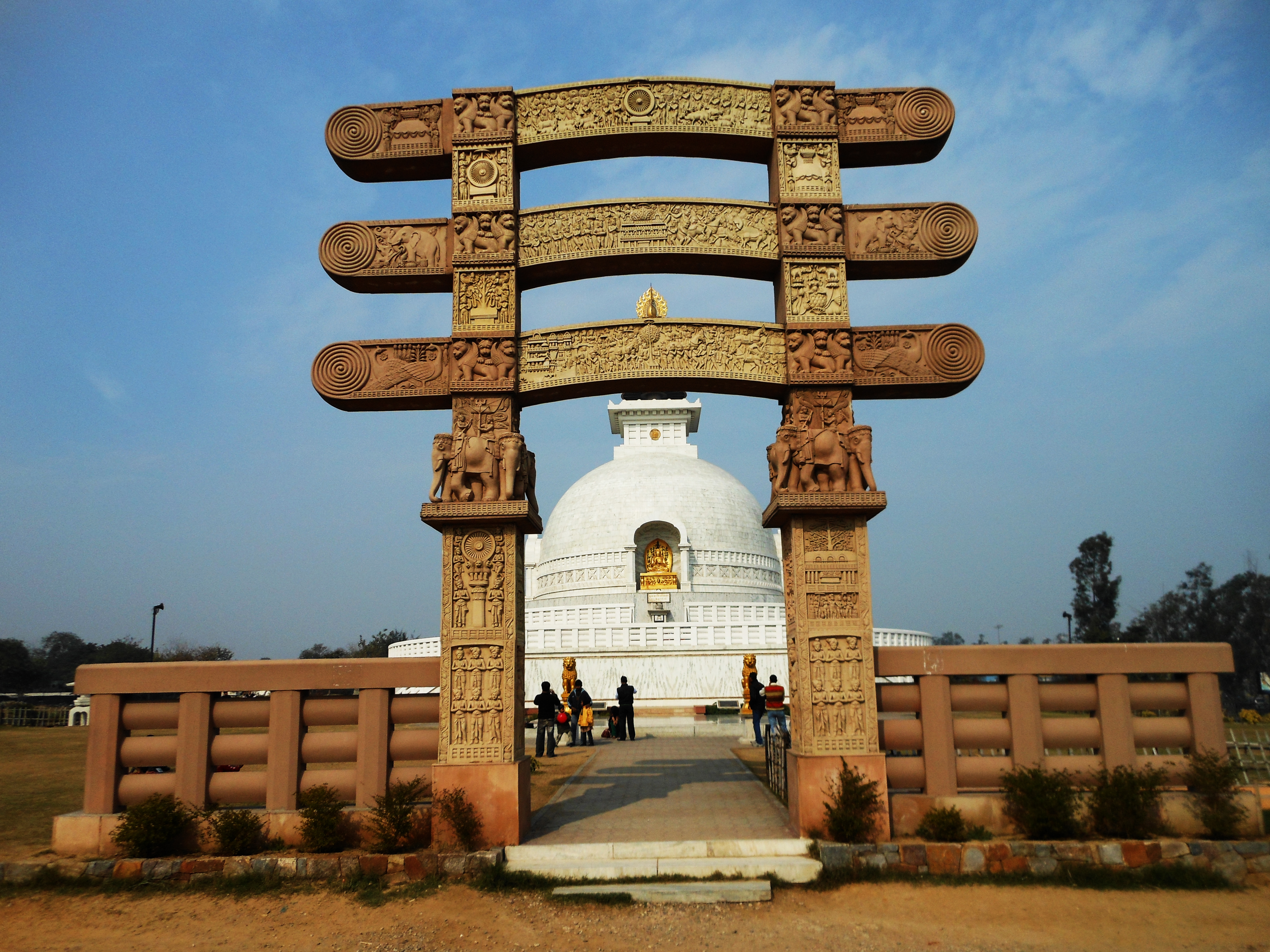
Front view of Shanti Stupa

== See also ==
- Peace Pagoda
