= Kailash (disambiguation) =

Kailash is a mountain in Tibet, considered to be sacred in four religions. For the abode of Hindu god Shiva, see Kailasha.

Kailash may also refer to:

== Places and buildings ==
- Kailash, Nepal
- Kailash Colony, in South Delhi, India
  - Kailash Colony metro station
  - Greater Kailash
    - Greater Kailash (Delhi Assembly constituency)
    - Greater Kailash metro station
- Kailaasa, a microstate founded by Nithyananda

== People ==
- Kailash (actor) (fl. from 2008), Indian actor
- Bacchu Kailash (born 1995), Nepalese singer and musician
- Kailash Bhansali (born 1942), Indian politician
- Kailash Baitha (born 1948), Indian politician
- Kailash Chawla (born 1948), Indian politician
- Kailash Chandra Gahtori (1968–2024), Indian businessman and politician
- Kailash Chandra Joshi (1929–2019), Indian politician
- Kailash Nath Kasudhan (fl. from 1999), Nepalese politician
- Kailash Nath Katju (1887–1968), Indian politician
- Kailash Kher (born 1973), Indian pop singer
- Kailash Chandra Meghwal (born 1934), Indian politician
- Kailash Chandra Meher (born 1954), Indian artist, inventor and social activist
- Kailash Patil, (born 1987), Indian footballer
- Kailash Purryag (born 1947), President of Mauritius
- Kailash Mehra Sadhu (born 1956), (female) Kashmiri singer
- Kailash Sankhala (1925–1994), Indian naturalist and conservationist
- Kailash Satyarthi (born 1954), Indian children's rights activist and Nobel Peace Prize Laureate
- Kailash Nath Sonkar, Indian politician
- Kailash Surendranath (fl. from 1986), Indian filmmaker
- Kailash Vijayvargiya (born 1956), Indian politician
- Kailash Nath Singh Yadav (born 1957), Indian politician

== Other uses ==
- Kailash (journal), scholarly journal about the Himalayan region
- Kailash, a taxonomic synonym for the moth genus Nephelomilta

== See also ==
- Bhookailas (disambiguation)
- Kinnaur Kailash, a mountain in the Kinnaur district, Himachal Pradesh, India
- Manimahesh Kailash Peak, or Chamba Kailash, in Chamba district, Himachal Pradesh, India
- Shrikhand Kailash
- Adi Kailash
- Kailasa (band), Indian band
  - Kailasa (album), their self-titled album, 2006
- Kailasa Temple, Ellora
- Kailashey Kelenkari (disambiguation)
