= Kalkaji Mandir metro station =

Metro station in Delhi, India

Kalkaji Mandir

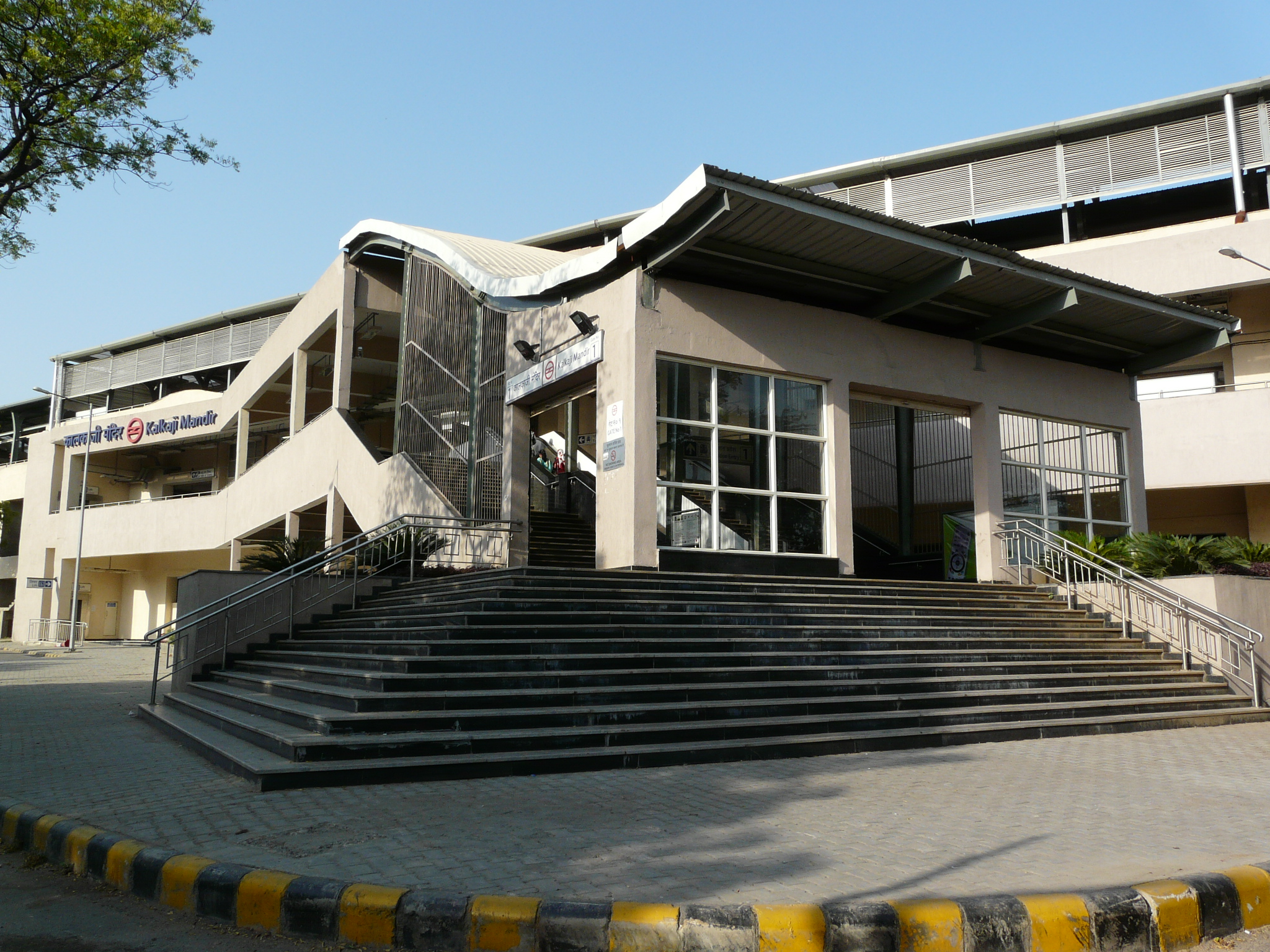

General information
- Location: Block 9, Kalkaji, South-East Delhi, Delhi - 110019
- Coordinates: 28.5496°N 77.2591°E
- System: Delhi Metro station
- Owner: Delhi Metro
- Line: Violet Line Magenta Line
- Platforms: Side platform; Platform-1 → Raja Nahar Singh (Ballabhgarh); Platform-2 → Kashmere Gate; Platform-3 → Botanical Garden; Platform-4 → Inderlok
- Tracks: 4

Construction
- Structure type: Violet Line - Elevated; Magenta Line - Underground
- Depth: 17 m (56 ft) (Magenta Line)
- Platform levels: 2
- Parking: Available
- Accessible: Yes

Other information
- Station code: KJMD

History
- Opened: Violet Line - 3 October 2010; 15 years ago; Magenta Line - 25 December 2017; 8 years ago
- Electrified: 25 kV 50 Hz AC through overhead catenary

Passengers
- October 2019: 91,595
- October 2023: 108,633 ▲18.6%

Services
Preceding station	Delhi Metro	Following station
Nehru Place towards Kashmere Gate	Violet Line	Govindpuri towards Raja Nahar Singh (Ballabhgarh)
Nehru Enclave towards Inderlok	Magenta Line	Okhla NSIC towards Botanical Garden
Route map
Location

The Kalkaji Mandir metro station is an interchange station between the Violet Line and the Magenta Line of Delhi Metro. It serves the area of Kalkaji in South-East Delhi, and provides access to many tourist sites such as Kalkaji Mandir, Lotus Temple, Prachin Bhairav Mandir and ISKCON Temple. The station was opened along with the first section of the Violet Line from Central Secretariat - Sarita Vihar on 3 October 2010, in time for the Commonwealth Games opening ceremony on the same day. Its interchange with the Magenta Line was opened on 25 December 2017.

The Violet Line station is elevated while the Magenta Line station is underground. Both of these are connected by a 260 m (850 ft) long pedestrian bridge. The underground station is situated at a depth of 17 m (56 ft) and both of its tracks pass through a single-tube twin tunnel, which was constructed using the New Austrian tunneling method (NATM). This had to be done because the station had to pass beneath the operational Violet Line.

== Station layout ==
Station Layout Violet Line

P	Side platform | Doors will open on the left
P	Platform 1 Southbound	Towards → Raja Nahar Singh (Ballabhgarh); Next Station: Govindpuri
P	Platform 2 Northbound	Towards ← Kashmere Gate; Next Station: Nehru Place
P	Side platform | Doors will open on the left
C	Concourse	Fare control, station agent, metro card vending machines, crossover
G	Street Level	Gates

Station layout Magenta Line

P	Side platform | Doors will open on the left
P	Platform 3 Eastbound	Towards → Botanical Garden; Next Station: Okhla NSIC
P	Platform 4 Westbound	Towards ← Inderlok; Next Station: Nehru Enclave
P	Side platform | Doors will open on the left
C	Concourse	Fare control, station agent, metro card vending machines, crossover
G	Street Level	Gates

== Connections ==
=== Bus ===
- DTC buses: DTC bus routes numbers 8A, 244, 306, 374, 375, 412, 424, 427, 427A, 428, 440A, 442, 445A, 447, 465, 465A, 492, 493, 511, 511A, 511ALNKSTL, 529, 529SPL, 534, 534A, 534CLVIA, 534VIA2, 544A, 567A, 568A, 724, 724EXT, 727LSTL, 751LSTL, 764, 764B, 764EXT, 874, 930, 964, CBD-3 (+), and CBD-3 (-) serve the station from nearby Nehru Place bus terminal.

== See also ==
- List of Delhi Metro stations
- Transport in Delhi
