= Harkesh Nagar Okhla metro station =

Delhi Metro station

Harkesh Nagar Okhla

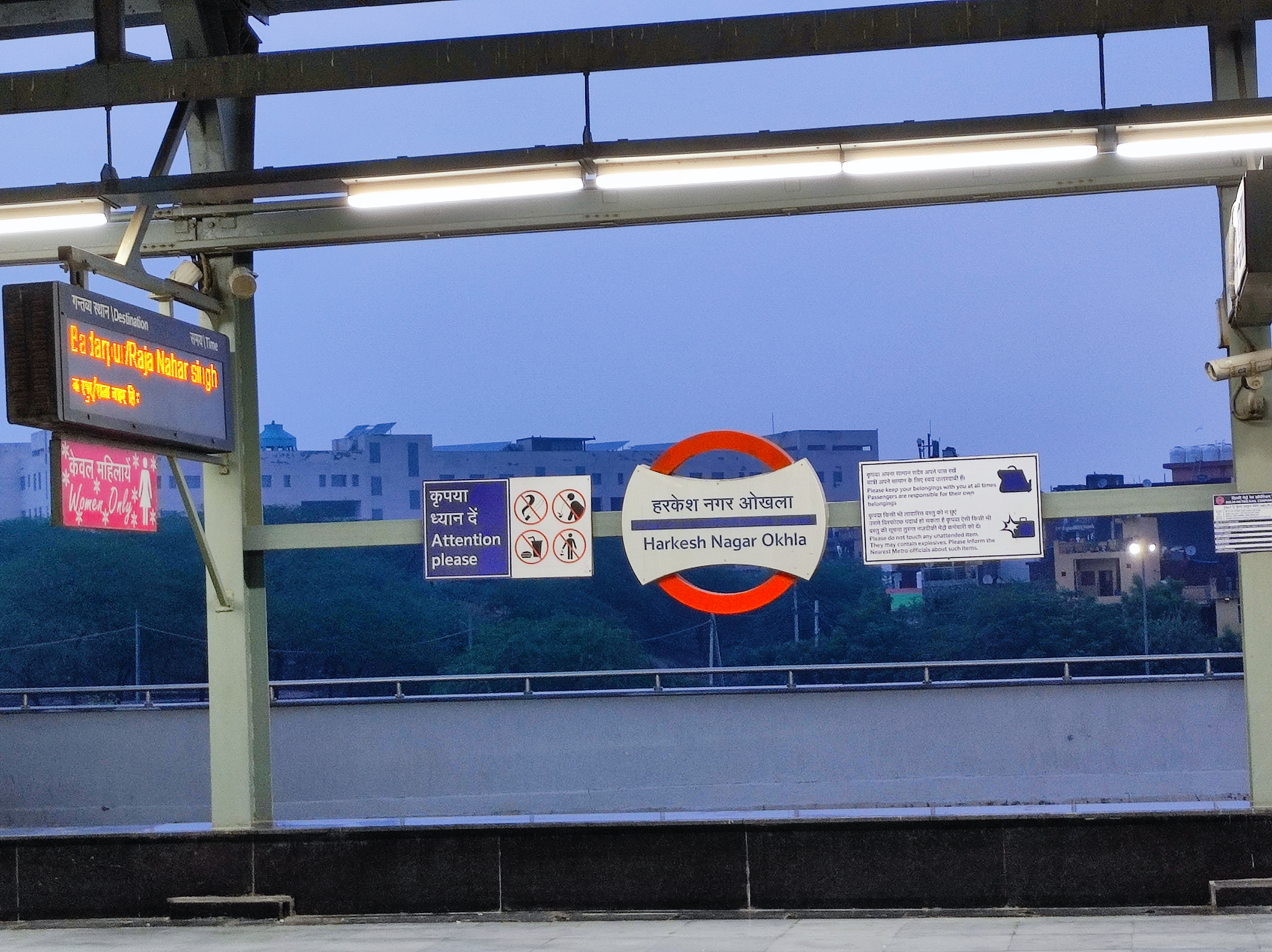

General information
- Location: Okhla Phase II, Okhla Industrial Area, New Delhi, Delhi 110020
- Coordinates: 28°32′35″N 77°16′31″E
- System: Delhi Metro station
- Owner: Delhi Metro
- Operator: Delhi Metro Rail Corporation (DMRC)
- Line: Violet Line
- Platforms: Side platform; Platform-1 → Raja Nahar Singh (Ballabhgarh); Platform-2 → Kashmere Gate
- Tracks: 2

Construction
- Structure type: Elevated, Double-track
- Platform levels: 2
- Parking: Available
- Accessible: Yes

Other information
- Status: Staffed, Operational
- Station code: HNOK

History
- Opened: 3 October 2010; 15 years ago
- Electrified: 25 kV 50 Hz AC through overhead catenary

Passengers
- Jan 2015: 6,303/day 195,386/ Month average

Services
Preceding station	Delhi Metro	Following station
Govindpuri towards Kashmere Gate	Violet Line	Jasola Apollo towards Raja Nahar Singh (Ballabhgarh)
Route map
Location

Harkesh Nagar Okhla is a Delhi Metro station in Delhi. It is located between Govindpuri and Jasola Apollo stations on the Violet Line. The station was opened with the first section of the Line on 3 October 2010 in time for the Commonwealth Games opening ceremony on the same day. It was earlier known as Okhla, and was renamed in December 2014. It serves Harkesh Nagar, Shyam Nagar, Okhla Phase II and IIIT Delhi.

== The station ==
=== Station layout ===
L2	Side platform | Doors will open on the left
L2	Platform 1 Southbound	Towards → Raja Nahar Singh (Ballabhgarh); Next Station: Jasola Apollo
L2	Platform 2 Northbound	Towards ← Kashmere Gate; Next Station: Govindpuri
L2	Side platform | Doors will open on the left
L1	Concourse	Fare control, station agent, Metro Card vending machines, crossover
G	Street Level	Exit/Entrance

=== Facilities ===
List of available ATM at Harkesh Nagar Okhla metro station are HDFC Bank

== Entry/Exit ==
Harkesh Nagar Okhla metro station Entry/exits
Gate No-1	Gate No-2	Gate No-3

== See also ==
- Delhi
- Govindpuri
- List of Delhi Metro stations
- Transport in Delhi
- Delhi Metro Rail Corporation
- Delhi Suburban Railway
- Delhi Monorail
- Delhi Transport Corporation
- South East Delhi
- New Delhi
- National Capital Region (India)
- List of rapid transit systems
- List of metro systems
