= Nehru Place =

- Neighborhood of Delhi
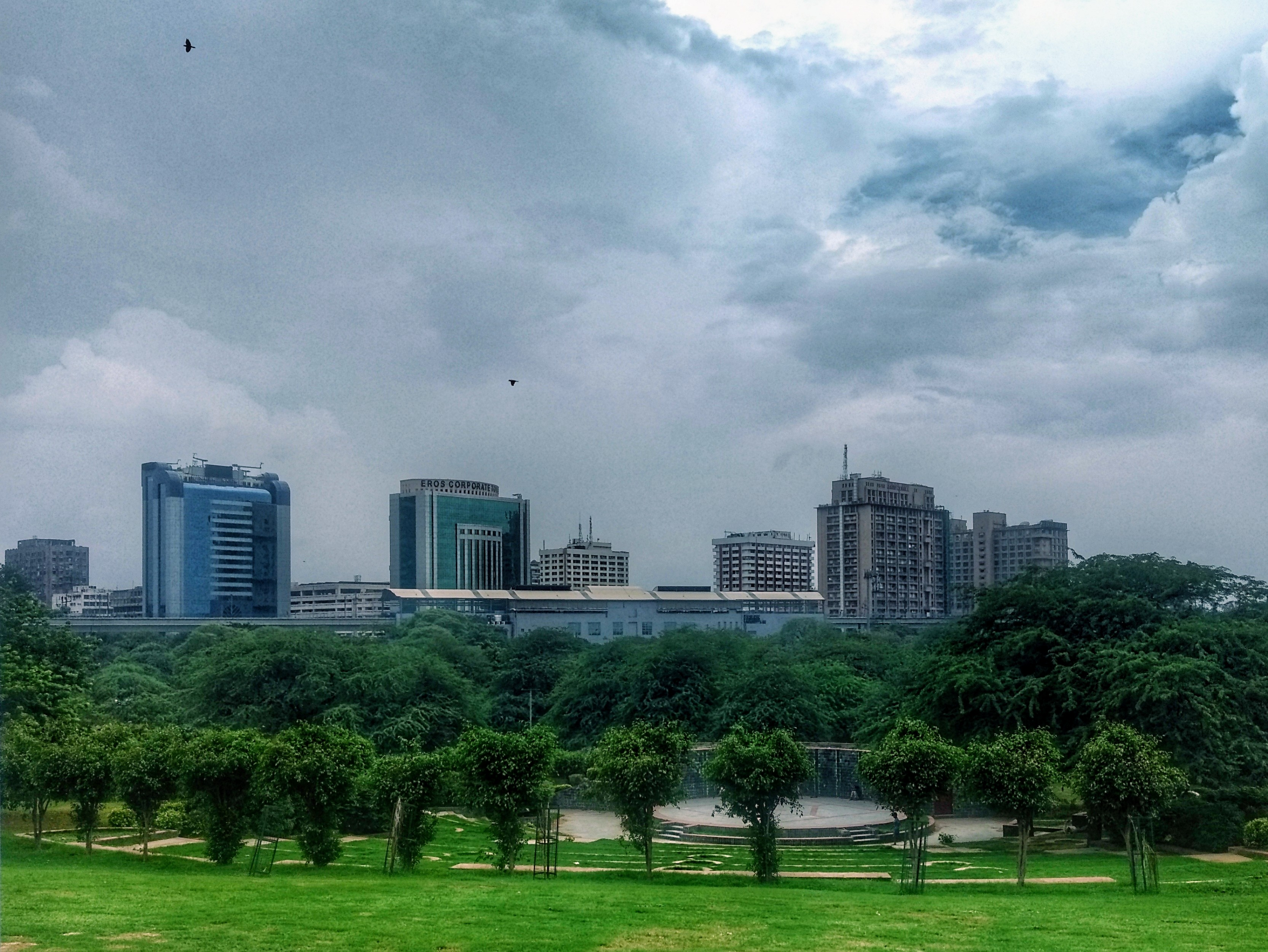
- Skyline of Nehru Place IT park

- Location in Delhi, India
- Coordinates: 28°32′50″N 77°15′03″E
- Country: India
- State: Delhi
- District: South East Delhi

Languages
  - Official: Hindi
- Time zone: UTC+5:30 (IST)
- Planning agency: MCD
- Website: https://www.nehruplacedealers.com

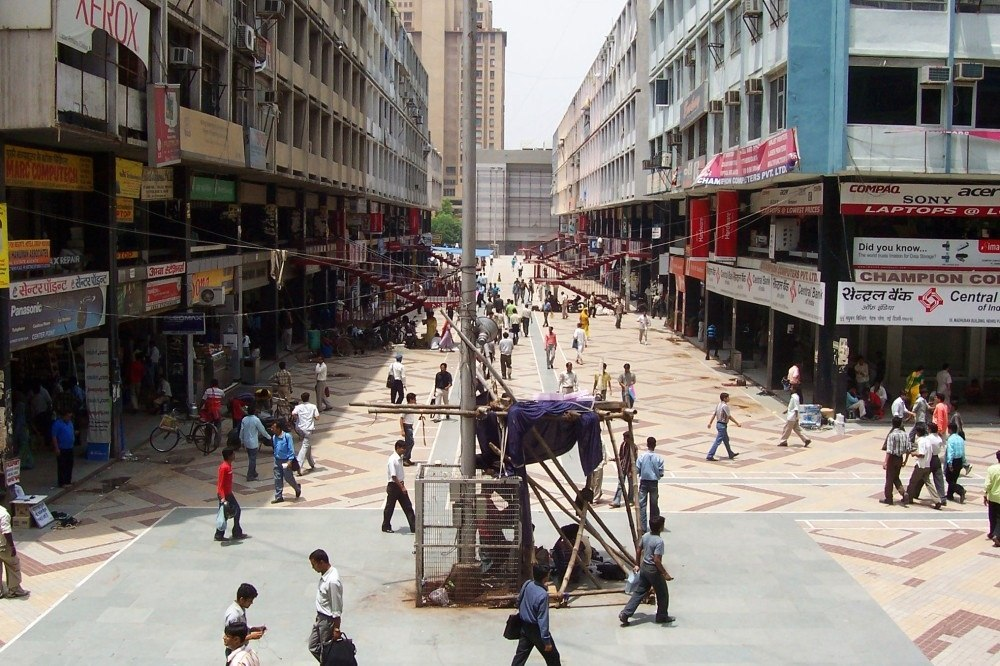
Main commercial centre, Nehru Place, South East Delhi, India

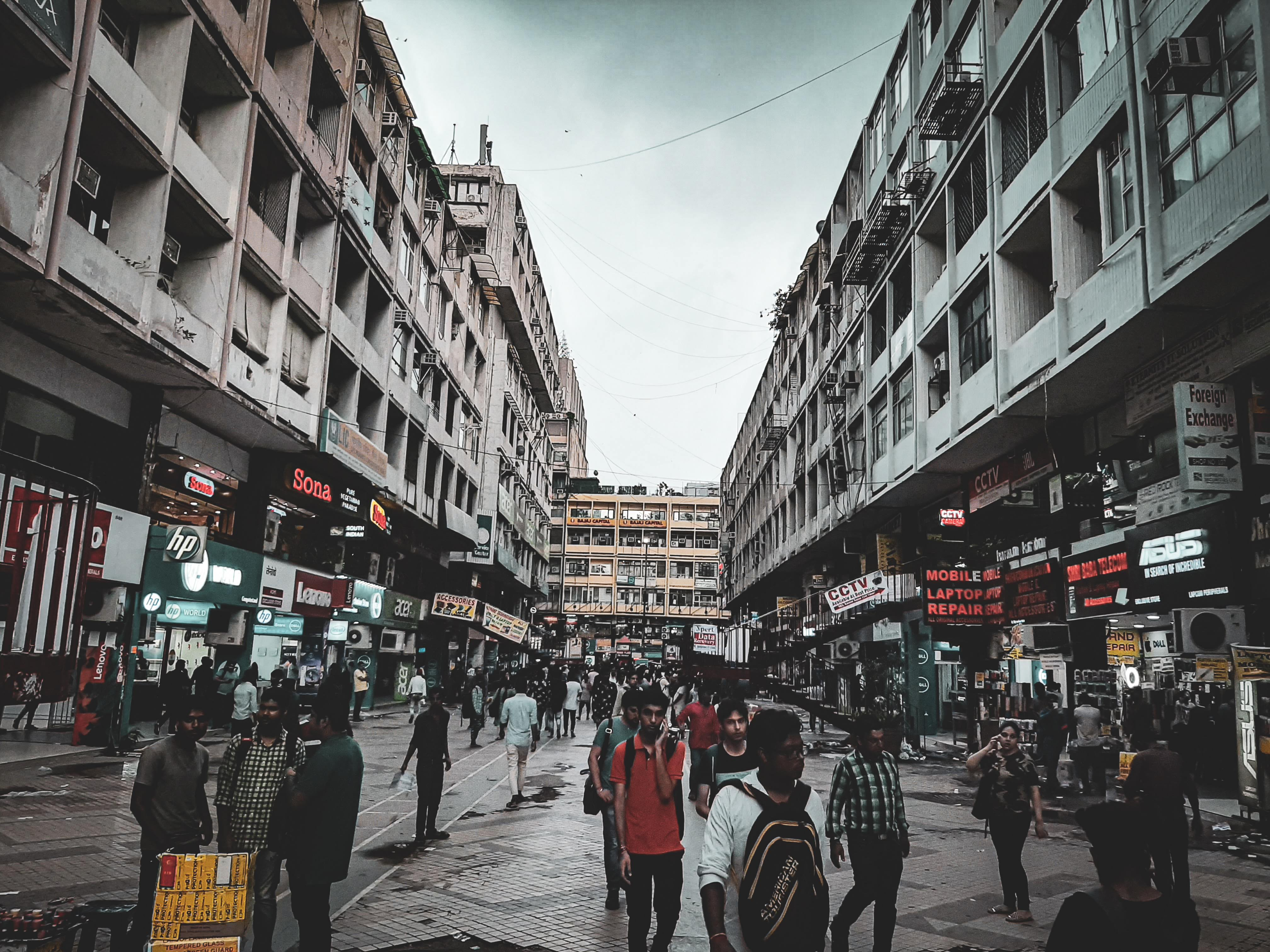
Nehru Palace Market

Nehru Place is a large commercial centre in Delhi, India. Although its importance as a financial centre has declined in recent years, Nehru Place is still a prominent commercial area in South East Delhi and houses the headquarters of several Indian firms and rivals with other financial centres in the metropolis like Connaught Place, Bhikaji Cama Place and Rajendra Place.

It had been listed as a notorious market between 2009 and 2014 by the USTR for selling counterfeit software, media and goods.

Nehru Place is named after Jawaharlal Nehru, the first prime minister of India.

== Background ==
This is part of 11 district centres developed by the Delhi Development Authority in the 1970s. It was developed during the Congress govt when Jagmohan was heading the DDA. As per the reports, it was completed in 1972 and it started with 89 buildings. The land was developed primarily from the previous village of Tughlakabad.

In the place where Nehru Place is currently situated, there were slums. Jagmohan was the key person who was responsible for the beautification of Delhi.

== Location and accessibility ==
Nehru Place is accessible by all forms of public transport, as it lies next to the Outer Ring Road, an arc that encompasses major parts of South Delhi. In addition, bus services are very frequent, usually once every five to eight minutes. Private taxis are also available, as well as paid parking for cars and motorcycles. The famous Lotus Temple of the Baháʼí Faith is also located close by. Nehru place is also accessible by Delhi Metro. The nearest metro stations include Nehru Place, Kalkaji Mandir and Nehru Enclave.

- Has its own Delhi-Metro Station on Violet Line (Kashmere Gate to Raja Nahar Singh)
- Has a second Metro Station by the name of Nehru Enclave on Magenta Line (Botanical garden-Janakpuri West) connecting commuters with a short route from Gurgaon with an interchange at Hauz Khas, and directly connecting Noida and IGI Airport.
- It is 30 minutes from Hazrat Nizamuddin Railway Station
- It is 1 hr from New Delhi Railway Station
- It has its own bus terminal, popularly known as Nehru Place Bus Terminal.

== Areas near Nehru Place ==
- Shaheen Bagh
- Greater Kailash
- Sarita Vihar
- Kailash Colony
- Okhla
- Kalkaji
- Govindpuri
- Chittaranjan Park
- Malviya Nagar
- Saket (Delhi)

== Nearby spiritual places ==
- ISKCON Temple Delhi
- Kalka Mandir
- Lotus Temple
- Prachin Bhairav Mandir

== See also ==
- List of things named after Jawaharlal Nehru
