= Jasola Apollo metro station =

Metro station in Delhi, India

Jasola Apollo

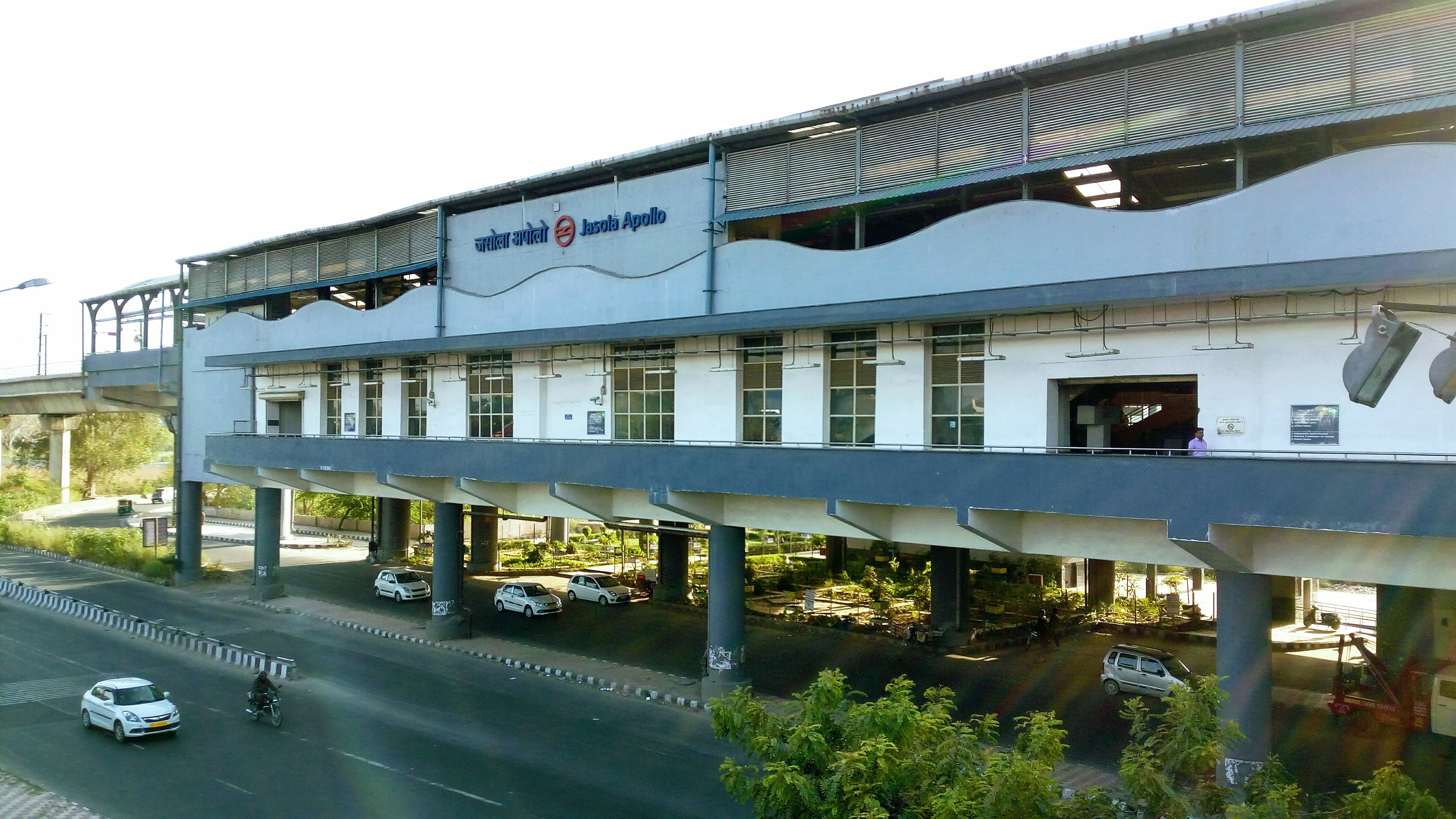
- Jasola Apollo Metro Station

General information
- Location: Jasola, New Delhi 110025
- Coordinates: 28°32′17″N 77°17′00″E
- System: Delhi Metro station
- Owner: Delhi Metro
- Line: Violet Line
- Platforms: Side platform; Platform-1 → Raja Nahar Singh (Ballabhgarh); Platform-2 → Kashmere Gate
- Tracks: 2

Construction
- Structure type: Elevated, Double-track
- Platform levels: 2
- Parking: Available
- Accessible: Yes

Other information
- Status: Staffed, Operational
- Station code: JLA

History
- Opened: 3 October 2010; 15 years ago
- Electrified: 25 kV 50 Hz AC through overhead catenary

Passengers
- Jan 2015: 9,530/day 295,416/ Month average

Services
| Preceding station | Delhi Metro | Following station |
|---|---|---|
| Harkesh Nagar Okhla towards Kashmere Gate | Violet Line | Sarita Vihar towards Raja Nahar Singh (Ballabhgarh) |
Route map
Location

Jasola Apollo is a Delhi Metro station in Delhi. It is located between Harkesh Nagar Okhla and Sarita Vihar stations on the Violet Line.

== History ==
The station was opened with the first section of the Line on 3 October 2010 in time for the Commonwealth Games opening ceremony on the same day.

This station is named to denote its vicinity to the nearby Jasola area and Indraprastha Apollo hospital. The station is spread in a relatively big area and is connected to the Apollo hospital via a huge foot-over-bridge.

== The station ==
=== Station layout ===
| L2 | Side platform | Doors will open on the left |
| L2 | Platform 1 Southbound | Towards → Raja Nahar Singh (Ballabhgarh); Next Station: Sarita Vihar |
| L2 | Platform 2 Northbound | Towards ← Kashmere Gate; Next Station: Harkesh Nagar Okhla |
| L2 | Side platform | Doors will open on the left |
| L1 | Concourse | Fare control, station agent, Metro Card vending machines, crossover |
| G | Street Level | Exit/Entrance |

=== Facilities ===
The station also houses several ATMs, food kiosks and a book store run by WHSmith. List of available ATM at Jasola Apollo metro station are IndusInd Bank, Ratnakar Bank

== Entry/Exit ==
Jasola Apollo metro station Entry/exits
| Gate No-1 | Gate No-2 |

== Connections ==
It is located on Mathura road. A nearby "kos-minar" (kos is an Indian unit of distance) belonging to Sher-shah suri sultanate is visible from the balcony of this station.

== See also ==
- Delhi
- Govindpuri
- List of Delhi Metro stations
- Transport in Delhi
- Delhi Metro Rail Corporation
- Delhi Suburban Railway
- Delhi Monorail
- Delhi Transport Corporation
- South East Delhi
- New Delhi
- National Capital Region (India)
- List of rapid transit systems
- List of metro systems
