= Lotus Temple =

Baháʼí House of Worship in New Delhi, India

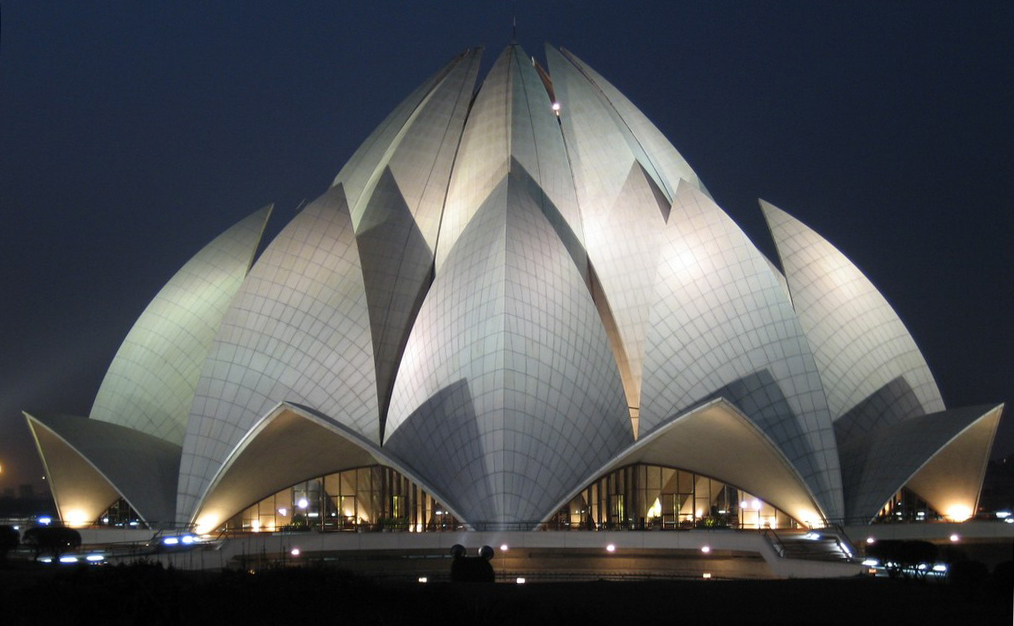
- Full view of the Lotus Temple

General information
- Type: House of Worship
- Architectural style: Expressionist
- Location: Kalkaji, Delhi, India
- Coordinates: 28.553328°N 77.258456°E
- Completed: 30 September 1986; 40 years ago
- Opened: 1 January 1987; 39 years ago
- Inaugurated: 24 December 1986; 39 years ago

Height
- Height: 40.8 metres (134 ft)

Dimensions
- Diameter: 70 metres (230 ft)

Technical details
- Structural system: Cast-in-place reinforced concrete shells, clad in marble

Design and construction
- Architect: Fariborz Sahba
- Structural engineer: Flint & Neill
- Main contractor: ECC Construction Group, Larsen & Toubro

Other information
- Seating capacity: 1,300
- Public transit: Kalkaji Mandir Magenta Line

The Lotus Temple, also known as the Baháʼí House of Worship, New Delhi, is a Baháʼí House of Worship at Bahapur in south Delhi, India. Designed by the architect Fariborz Sahba, it takes the form of a half-open lotus of 27 free-standing marble-clad concrete petals, arranged in three rings of nine around a central hall. It was dedicated on 24 December 1986 and opened to the public on 1 January 1987.

Baháʼís in India first sought permission for a House of Worship in 1920, and the land at Bahapur was bought in 1954 under a plan set by Shoghi Effendi. On 1 April 1974, the Universal House of Justice led plans for its development as part of a Baháʼí Five Year Plan. Construction by the ECC Construction Group of Larsen & Toubro, to a structural design by the London engineers Flint & Neill, ran from 1980 to 1986.

The temple is among the most visited sites in India, drawing several million visitors a year and, by 2014, more than 100 million in all. Reviewers compared it with the Sydney Opera House on its completion, and it received awards from bodies including the Institution of Structural Engineers and the American Concrete Institute. India placed it on its World Heritage tentative list in 2014.

== History ==
Delegates to the first All-India Bahai Convention in Bombay, December 1920

On 27 December 1920, the first All-India Baháʼí Convention meeting, held in Bombay, resolved to form a committee to raise funds for the temple.

In 1953, Shoghi Effendi, ʻAbdu'l-Bahá's grandson and successor as head of the faith, set a Ten Year Plan for the Indian subcontinent. Its ninth goal was to buy land in New Delhi for India's first House of Worship. He directed the National Spiritual Assembly of India, the Baháʼí community's elected national governing body, to buy the land. The Assembly settled on a tract of hilly, undeveloped land containing five plots, measured at 92,000 square metres (23 acres), in south Delhi. Revenue records compiled when the boundaries were marked out recorded the ground as part of a village called Bahapur, which translates as "Abode of Bahá". Shoghi Effendi approved the choice of site in July 1954, and the land had been bought by September 1954. (Note: Pearson and Momen give 1953 as the year of purchase. Shoghi Effendi's correspondence records his approval of the site in July 1954 and the National Spiritual Assembly's report of the completed purchase in September 1954.)

The government later requisitioned the site for a green belt, which was released on 1 February 1978 following representations by the Indian National Spiritual Assembly. (Note: From 1959, the Delhi Development Authority pursued a programme to acquire 34,000 acres (14,000 ha) of land in the city for public development.)

On 1 April 1974, the Universal House of Justice, the faith's elected international governing body, asked national Baháʼí assemblies to invite architects to submit their qualifications for the Indian and Samoan temples, stating that beginning their construction was a goal of the Five Year Plan. Fariborz Sahba, one of 45 architects who entered a worldwide competition held for the project, was selected in 1976. His design was approved by the House of Justice in August 1977, and two months later, on 17 October, Rúhíyyih Khánum laid the foundation stone.

Flint & Neill Partnership of London, the structural engineers, produced the detailed drawings that took over two and a half years. In 1979, Sahba moved his practice from London to Delhi and remained on site as project manager until the building was finished. The main contract was awarded in 1980 to Engineering Construction Corporation, which was later called the ECC Construction Group of Larsen & Toubro after its acquisition. Work on the temple began in April 1980. The contractors recorded completion on 30 September 1986.

The temple was dedicated on 24 December 1986 by Rúhíyyih Khánum, representing the Universal House of Justice, which had announced the dedication earlier that year as part of a programme running from 23 to 27 December. The temple was opened to the general public on 1 January 1987.

== Architecture ==
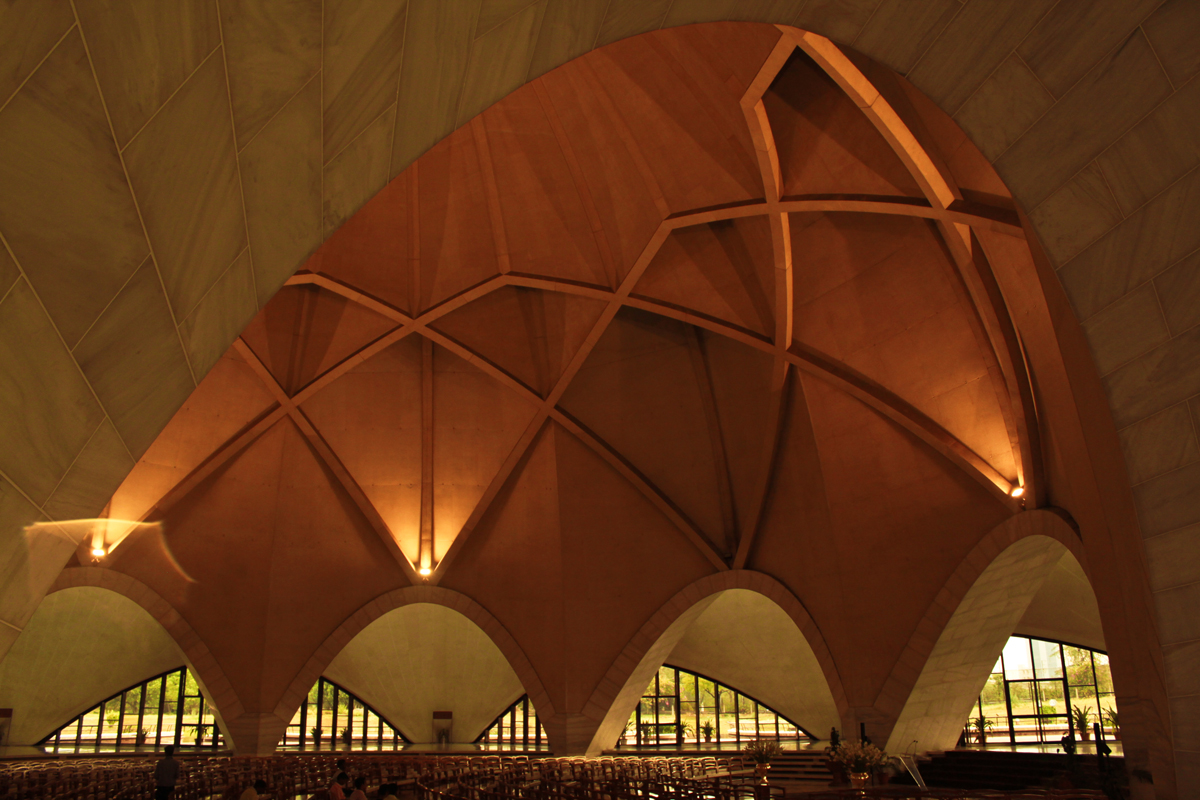
The central hall, lit through the folds of the petals

The temple is an Expressionist building modelled on a lotus flower. Before settling on the design, Sahba toured India to study its culture and visited over 100 temples. He chose the shape of the lotus because it is considered sacred by several of India's religions, including Hinduism and Buddhism, and symbolizes purity in some traditions.

The design of the temple follows the requirement set for all Baháʼí Houses of Worship by ʻAbdu'l-Bahá: they had to be nine-sided and circular. Sahba's lotus is built from 27 petals, which rise in threes from nine arches set in a circle. From a distance, the building suggests a lotus bud opening. The petals form three rings: the outermost petals flare out above the nine doorways, the middle ring curves inward to cover the circle-shaped hall, and the innermost petals stay nearly closed around the central hall. The inner petals do not close in and leave an opening at the crown that is roofed with glass and steel.

The petals were designed using simple geometric forms, including spheres, cylinders, cones and toroids. Beneath the inner petals a second dome made of interlocking ribs forms the ceiling of the central hall, with daylight from the skylight illuminating the layers. The concrete shells are thin, with the inner petals about 20 centimetres (8 in) thick. The petals facing outside of the temple are clad with white Pentelic marble from Greece, while the interior side that faces the hall is white concrete hammered by hand to a textured finish.

The temple is about 40 metres (130 ft) high and 70 metres (230 ft) across. The interior dome over the central hall rises 28 metres (90 ft) above the floor. The hall, which has room for as many as 2,500 people, lies a few steps lower than the walkway around it, and its seats face a plain lectern. Its floor is set with white marble, and the walkways and steps outside are red sandstone.

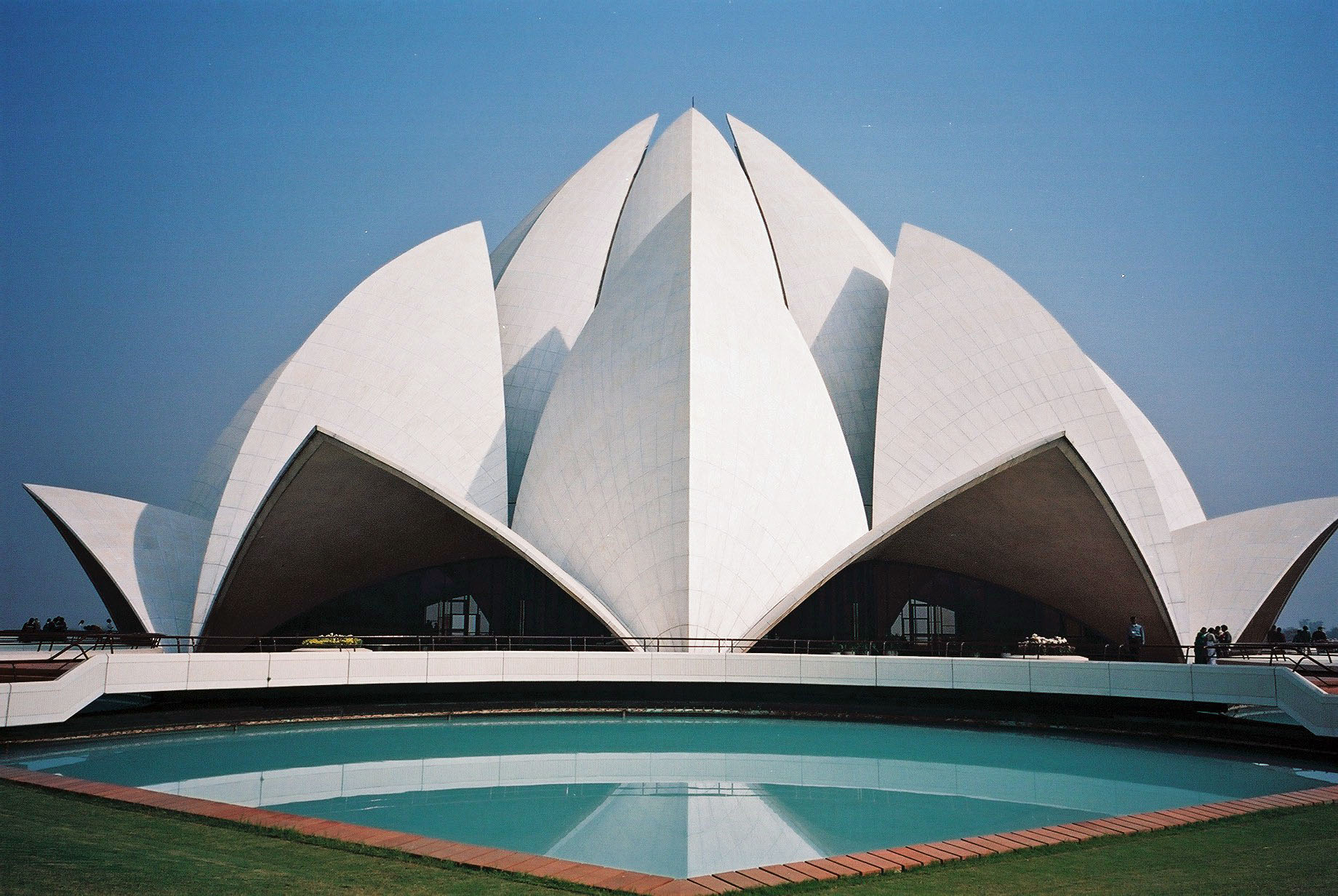
A view of one of the nine pools, which cool the air drawn into the hall as well as representing the leaves of the lotus

The temple was designed to be cooled by natural ventilation using the principle of the desert wind tower: outside air passes over the pools, is drawn into the basement, and then rises through the hall and leaves through the vents in the crown. The white marble reflects the sun's heat, and the overhangs shade the glass to allow daylight to enter while most direct sunlight is kept out. Four of the pools are set lower, at basement level, so that light and air also reach the rooms below the temple. Airflow through the building was tested with smoke on a 1:125 scale model at Imperial College London.

== Construction ==
The temple cost an estimated $8–10 million. It took six years to build with a workforce of 40 engineers and more than 700 labourers who worked largely by hand with little heavy machinery.

The temple sits on hard quartzite rock that is cracked throughout and contains scattered soft pockets of mica. Test drilling failed to identify the location and extent of the pockets, leading engineers to reject piles. Instead, the foundation pits were taken down to solid rock, in places 30 feet (9 m) deep, and each column rests on a concrete pad set on that rock and designed to take the full force of an earthquake.

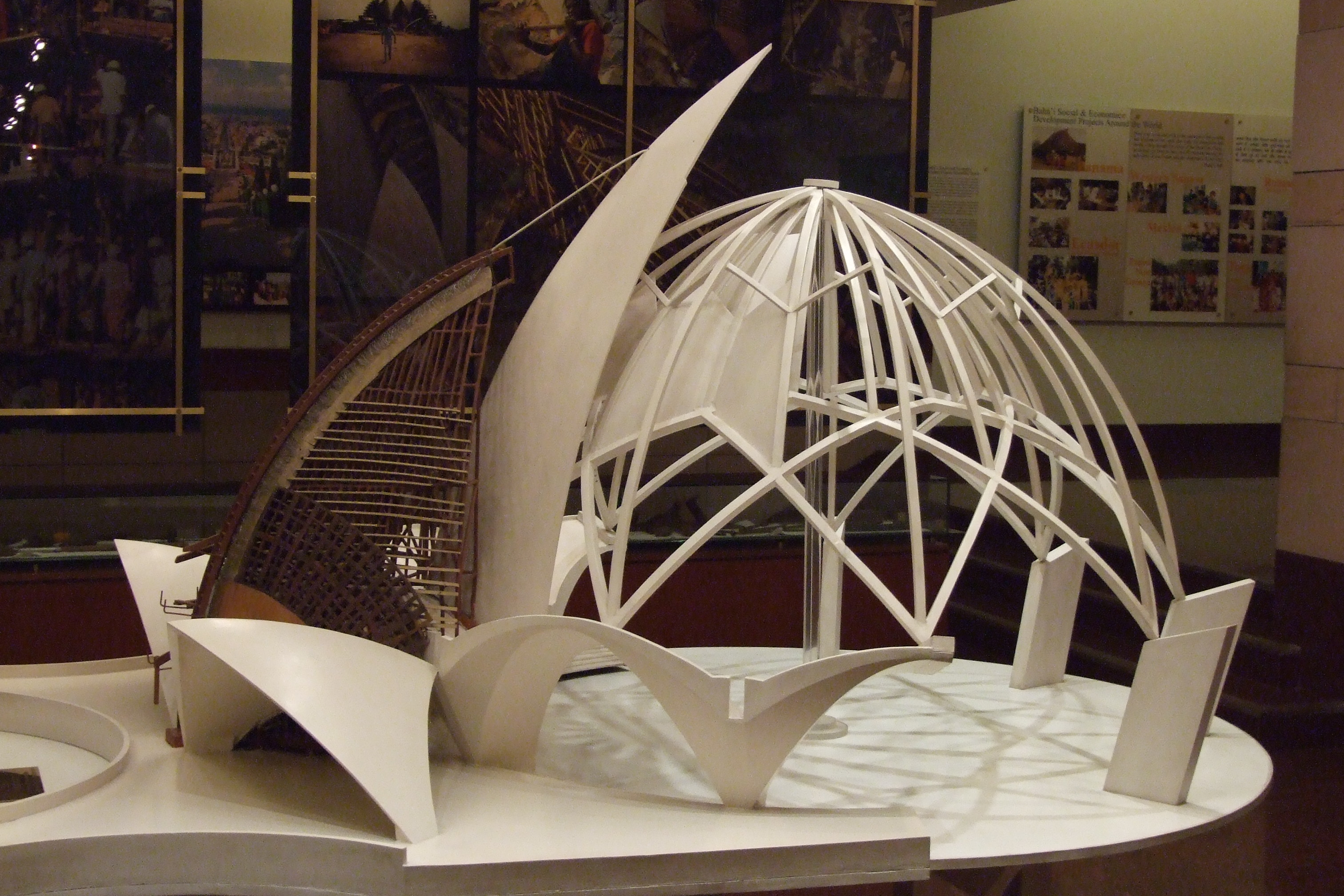
Model of the temple at the Information Centre

The engineers considered building the petals from precast panels or facing them with tiles, but chose to cast each shell in place in concrete, which could be left bare inside without plaster or paint. Full-size mock-ups of each shell were made at ground level, and the joints of the moulds were laid out to match the lines of the pattern on the finished concrete.

Indian cement did not satisfy the colour and strength requirements for the building, so white cement was imported from South Korea and mixed with dolomite from Alwar and white sand from Jaipur. In summer, when temperatures reached 45 °C (113 °F), ice was added to keep the concrete cool as it was poured. The steel reinforcement inside the white shells was galvanised so that rust could not stain the surface.

The petals are clad in about 10,000 square metres (110,000 sq ft) of marble, quarried on Mount Pentelicus in Greece and cut to shape in Italy; the site's carpenters fixed the panels to the shells with stainless steel brackets.

== Site and gardens ==
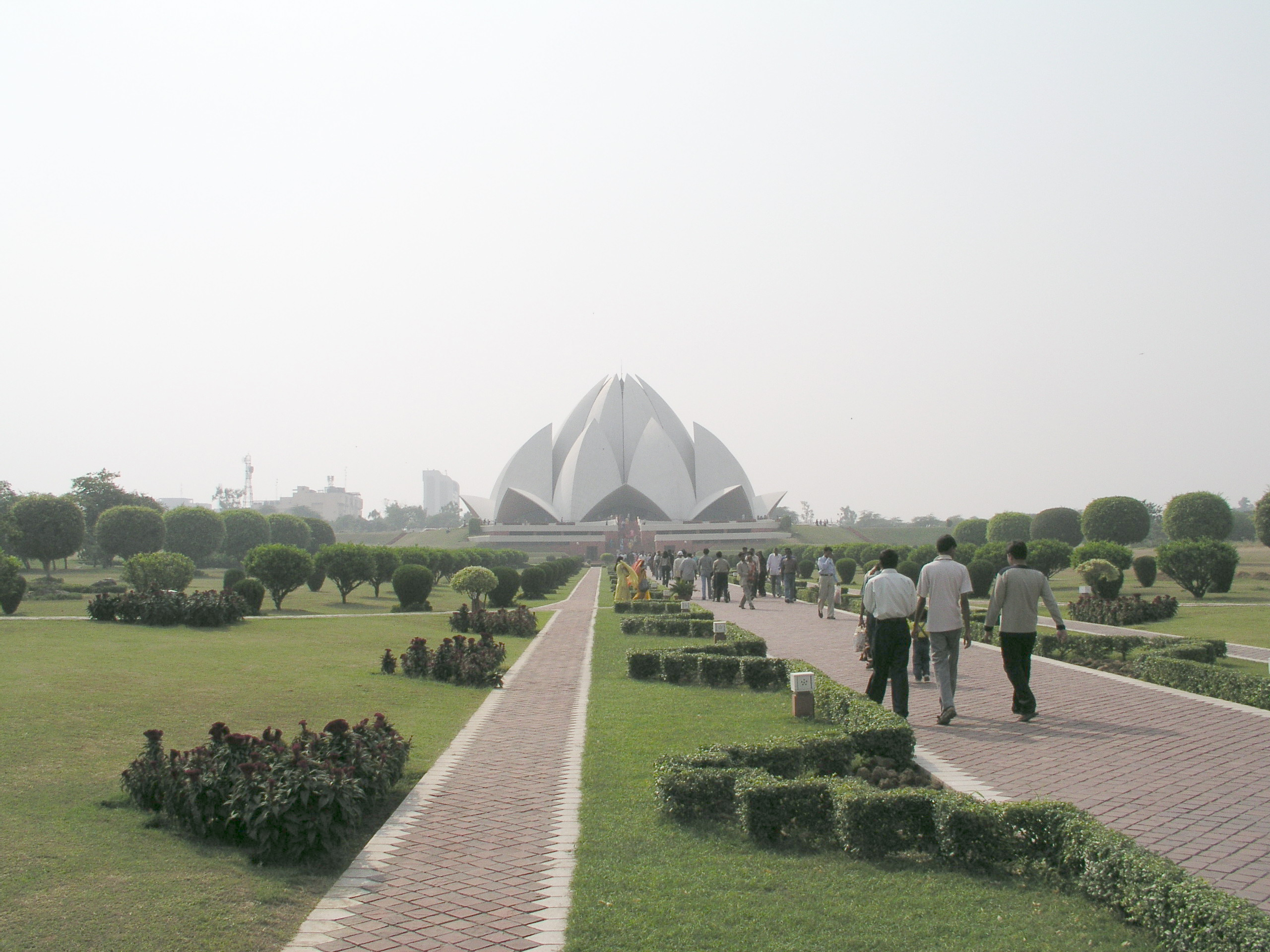
The gardens at the Lotus Temple

The temple stands on a 26.6-acre (10.8 ha) site on the southern outskirts of Delhi, in an area now called Bahapur, near the Hindu Kalkaji Temple and east of the commercial centre of Nehru Place. The nearest metro station is Kalkaji Mandir. The site lies west of the Yamuna river.

Nine pools surround the building and stand for the leaves of the lotus so that the flower appears to float. Walkways, bridges, stairs and curved balustrades run between the pools.

An ancillary building, set into the ground around the pools, houses a library, reception rooms and administrative offices. A separate visitor centre, with an auditorium seating 500, exhibition galleries and offices, was built in 2002, and was later opened to the public in 2003 as the Information Centre. An educational centre was added in 2017.

== Worship ==
Interior view of the ceiling of the Lotus Temple with the Ringstone Symbol set at the top

Anyone may enter the Lotus Temple regardless of religion, ethnicity or gender, as at every Baháʼí House of Worship. Programmes in the prayer hall consist of readings and recitations from the sacred books of the major world religions, arranged in advance, and at certain times members of the public may meditate and pray in silence. Because most Indian Baháʼís cannot afford the pilgrimage to Haifa, the building has also become the principal sacred site for the Baháʼí community in India.

Baháʼí practice places narrow limits on what may happen inside a temple: No sermons may be delivered, no ritual or elaborate ceremony performed, and nothing but scripture may be read or chanted. The Baháʼí writings direct that services be "simple, dignified, and designed to uplift the soul and educate it through hearing the creative word". There is no Baháʼí clergy, and collective worship consists of lay members reading from scripture rather than preaching. Choirs may sing settings of prayers and readings, but no musical instruments may be played in the hall.

== Visitors ==
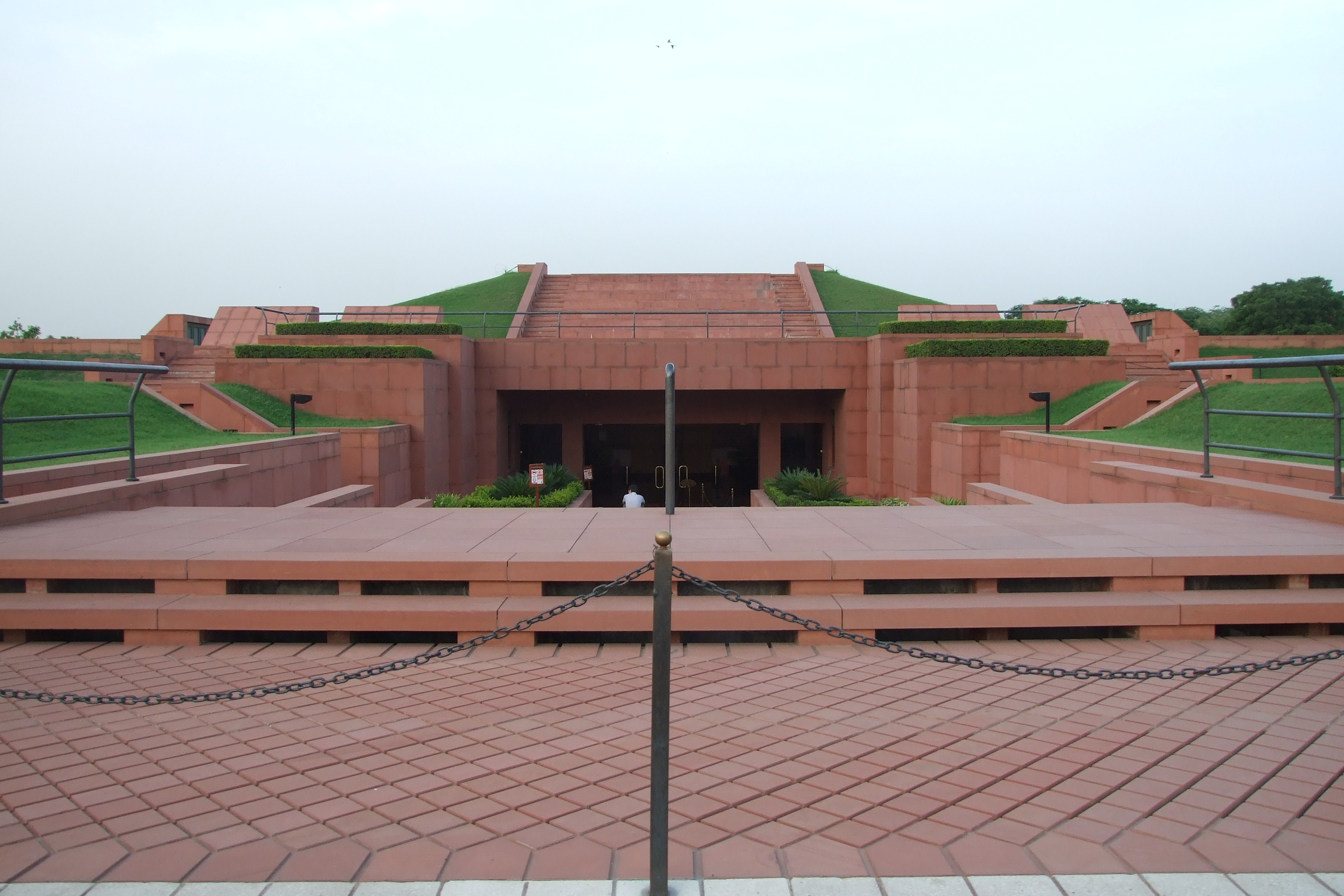
Information centre at the Baháʼí House of Worship

The Lotus Temple ranks among India's most visited sites and is often listed as one of Delhi's main tourist attractions. In 2025, it was described as the most frequented Baháʼí House of Worship and among the world's most visited religious buildings, and India's 2014 submission to UNESCO described it as one of the world's most visited monuments. Published estimates of annual attendance range from about 2.5 million to more than five million. (Note: By date of publication: Business Standard, nearly 400,000 visitors a month (1997); Garlington, over 2.5 million (2006); Momen, some 2.5 million (2010); Hassall, more than 4.6 million a year by 2007 (2012); Zukowsky, more than 4.5 million (2015); Pearson, more than five million (2022). The temple's general manager gave 5.6 million for 2014.)

The Caravan reported in 2011 that the temple drew more visitors than the Taj Mahal, expecting about six million that year against the Taj Mahal's four million, and credited the Kalkaji Mandir metro station, opened the previous October, with the rise. A CNN travel programme reported in 2001 that the record for a single day was 150,000 visitors. By April 2014, when the building was added to India's World Heritage tentative list, the Permanent Delegation of India to UNESCO stated that it had received over 100 million visitors since its inauguration in 1986.

== Reception and recognition ==
In February 1986, the Fédération Internationale de la Précontrainte (FIP) held its tenth congress in New Delhi where the structural engineers, Flint & Neill Partnership, presented their paper on the temple's design and construction, and about 2,000 of the visiting engineers toured the site. In the same year, John D'Allen, editor-in-chief of the London trade paper Construction News, predicted that it would come to be seen as one of the century's "building masterpieces", and the German structural engineer Fritz Leonhardt called it the twentieth century's Taj Mahal, a label the building has carried since.. J.R. Bhalla, former president of the International Union of Architects, commented that the temple "has brought lustre to the architectural profession"

In 1987, two American architecture journals reviewed the finished building, with both comparing it with the Sydney Opera House.

In Progressive Architecture, then senior editor Thomas Fisher wrote that the two buildings share overlapping shell roofs and a computer-derived geometry but differ in how they were built: Sydney's prefabricated, tile-clad sections had been "too complicated and exacting", while the Delhi shells were cast in place in plywood formwork, with the concrete carried up in baskets on workers' heads. He concluded that the temple "shows that high-tech concepts do not always demand high-tech solutions".

In Architecture: The American Institute of Architects Journal, Delhi architect Ranjit Sabikhi called the temple a major achievement for India's limited technology, built with great care and precision. He also wrote that the design had faults: identical doors on all nine sides leave the hall without "a focus or climax", and the joint lines of the marble disturbs the facade of the "hard and crisp white marble" exterior when seen close up, so the temple looks best when viewed from a distance.

Graham Hassall writes that surveys of late twentieth-century architecture now routinely include it, and that the Architectural Society of China chose it as one of a hundred canonical twentieth-century works. In April 2014, India placed the temple on its World Heritage tentative list.

=== Awards ===
The temple's awards include the following.

- 1987 – First Honor Award of the Interfaith Forum on Religious Art and Architecture, an affiliate of the American Institute of Architects
- 1987 – Award of the Institution of Structural Engineers, United Kingdom
- 1988 – Paul Waterbury Outdoor Lighting Design Award, special citation, from the Illuminating Engineering Society of North America
- 1989 – Award for excellence in a concrete structure from the Maharashtra-India Chapter of the American Concrete Institute
- 1990 – American Concrete Institute recognition as one of the world's finest concrete structures
- 2000 – GlobArt Academy Award, Vienna, for promoting unity across nations, religions and social classes

== Conservation and environment ==
Pollution damage to the temple's white marble has been reported since 1994: Down to Earth reported that dust and emissions from surrounding vehicles and industry were causing the marble exterior to peel, and that Delhi's pollution levels threatened a building the architect said had been built to last a thousand years. By 1997, the structure had greyed noticeably and the chairperson of the temple's management committee said that washing the marble with mild detergent three or four times a year did little against pollution; the managers attributed the pollution to industrial units in the vicinity, burning of rubber and plastics in nearby slums, railway traffic on the Okhla line, and emissions from the Badarpur power plant.

In 2015, a Delhi lawyer petitioned the National Green Tribunal over the discolouration. Two advocates appointed by the tribunal as local commissioners inspected the temple on 15 April 2015 and reported "visible discoloration of a large number of tiles", but could not establish the cause; they recorded dust from nearby construction, traffic congestion and open debris on the approach road. In 2016, The Hindu reported that vehicular emissions may have been contributing to the greying of the monument, and quoted an earlier statement by the Indian National Trust for Art and Cultural Heritage that pollution damage to Delhi's monuments is irreversible. A 2022 study in Geoheritage comparing the temple with the Taj Mahal concluded that India's legal protections for heritage stone monuments are inadequate against environmental pollution, and that this has contributed to their deterioration.

In 2015, the temple installed more than 400 photovoltaic panels of about 250 watts each, generating 120kW of its roughly 500kW demand and saving about ₹120,000 a month. The Hindu noted that it was "the first major public site in Delhi" to install a net meter, which brought it under the Delhi Electricity Regulatory Commission's net-metering rules.

== See also ==
- Baháʼí Faith in India
- Baháʼí World Centre buildings
- Other modern structures with similar designs:
  - Auditorio de Tenerife
  - Palau de les Arts Reina Sofia
  - Sydney Opera House
