= Fariborz Sahba =

Iranian-American architect (born 1948)

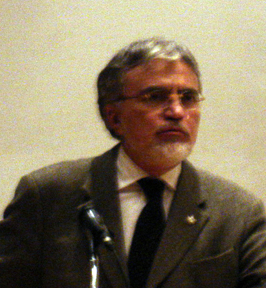
- Born: Fariborz Shahba; 1948 (age 77–78); Mashhad, Iran
- Education: University of Tehran
- Occupation: Architect

Ecclesiastical career
- Religion: Baháʼí Faith

Fariborz Sahba (Persian: فريبرز صهبا, born 1948 Mashhad) is an Iranian-American architect, best known for designing the Baháʼí Lotus Temple in Delhi, India.

== Education ==
Sahba has a master's degree from the Faculty of Fine Arts from the University of Tehran. In an interview with Mithaq Kazimi, he has stated that, at a very early age, he was encouraged by his mother to be an architect.

== Career ==
In Iran, Sahba has been involved in the design of a wide range of prestigious buildings, including:

- The New Town of Mahshahr– South-Western Iran
- The Pahlavi Cultural Center – Sanandaj, Iran
- The School of Art – Sanandaj, Iran
- Baháʼí House of Worship – Delhi, India
- Terraces (Baháʼí) – Haifa, Israel

=== Baháʼí House of Worship in Delhi, India ===
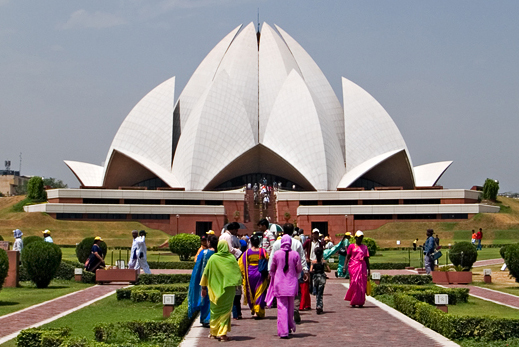
Sahba's Lotus Temple in India.

In 1976, the international governing body of the Baháʼí Faith community selected Sahba to design the Baháʼí House of Worship for the Indian subcontinent in Delhi, India. This project, on which he worked for 10 years as the architect and project manager, was described by Canadian architect Arthur Erickson as "one of the most remarkable achievements of our time, proving that the drive and vision of spirit can achieve miracles." With over 3.5 million visitors a year, this building, commonly known as the "Lotus Temple," is one of the most visited sites in the world.

=== The Terraces of the Shrine of the Báb ===
In 1987, Sahba was assigned by the Baháʼí World Centre the task of designing 18 terraces as a majestic approach to the Shrine of the Báb, the martyred Herald of the Baháʼí faith, one of the most holy places of the Baháʼí faith. He was also appointed project manager to execute the Baháʼí World Centre building projects on Mount Carmel. The Terraces of the Shrine of the Báb received the 1998 Ephraim Lifshitz Award from the Municipality of Haifa and the 1999 Magshim Award from the Council for a Beautiful Israel.

== Awards ==
Sahba has received many international awards, among them the First Honor Award in 1987 for "Excellence in Architecture" from the Interfaith Forum on Religion, Art, and Architecture, an affiliate of the American Institute of Architects. Articles about his work have been published in almost 400 magazines and newspapers throughout the world.

In 1987 the Institution of Structural Engineers of the United Kingdom granted a special award to the Baháʼí Temple in India, with a citation: "a building so emulating the beauty of a flower and so striking in its visual impact." He has also received the Paul Waterbury Outdoor Lighting Design Award from the Illuminating Engineering Society of North America in June 1988. In 1990, Bahaʼi House of Worship of India was recognized by the American Concrete Institute as "One of the finest concrete structures of the world".

In 2000, the GlobArt Academy of Vienna, Austria granted him the GlobArt Award, for "Overcoming religious barriers" and "promoting the unity and harmony of people of all nations and social strata, to an extent unsurpassed by any other architectural monument worldwide".

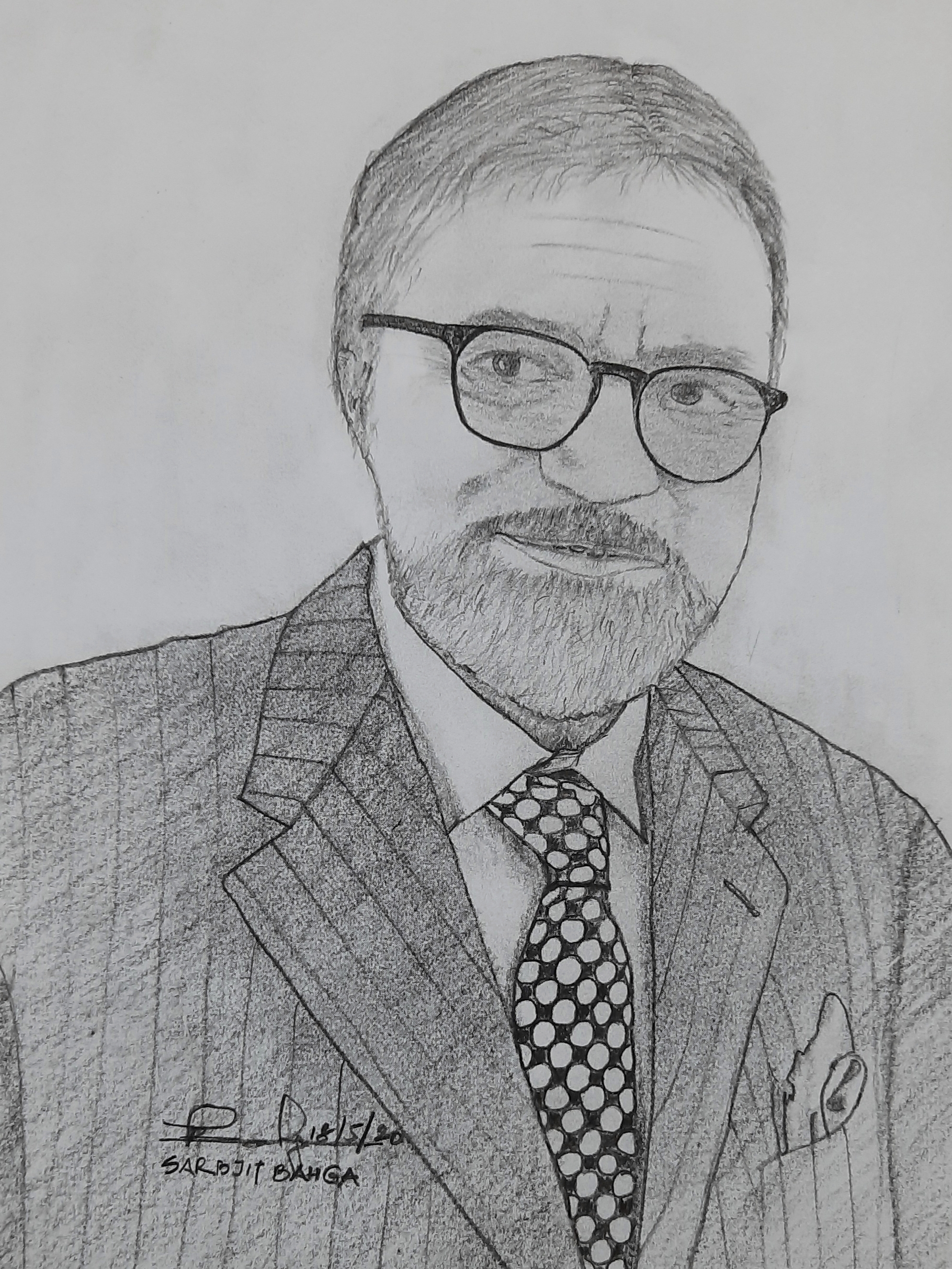
Fariborz Sahba - A pencil sketch by Sarbjit Bahga

== Publications ==
Fariborz Sahba has written and published several books. He has lectured extensively on the topics of Art, Architecture, Project Management, Culture and Environment as an official guest speaker in universities, institutes of architects, professional international conferences and organizations all over the world, including the United States, Canada, Israel, China, Hong Kong, Singapore, Macau, Australia, Papua New Guinea, Japan, Malaysia, India, UK, the Netherlands, Germany, Italy, Austria, France, Switzerland, Sweden, Uganda and South Africa.

In 1970 he founded a literary magazine for children called Varqá. The magazine, which originally appeared in Persian, was later published in nine languages. He served as Editor-in-Chief of Varqa International Childrenʼ Magazine (ISSN 1708-7767), a bi-monthly magazine published in Canada up to 2006.

== See also ==
- Persian architecture
- List of historical Iranian architects
