= Nehru Enclave metro station =

Metro station in Delhi, India

Nehru Enclave

General information
- Location: Block C, Kalkaji, Nehru Enclave, New Delhi, Delhi, 110019
- Coordinates: 28°32′45″N 77°15′04″E
- System: Delhi Metro station
- Owner: Delhi Metro
- Operator: Delhi Metro Rail Corporation (DMRC)
- Line: Magenta Line
- Platforms: Island platform Platform-1 → Botanical Garden; Platform-2 → Inderlok
- Tracks: 2

Construction
- Structure type: Underground, Double-track
- Platform levels: 2
- Accessible: Yes

Other information
- Status: Staffed, Operational
- Station code: NUEE

History
- Opened: 29 May 2018; 8 years ago
- Electrified: 25 kV 50 Hz AC through overhead catenary

Services
Preceding station	Delhi Metro	Following station
Greater Kailash towards Inderlok	Magenta Line	Kalkaji Mandir towards Botanical Garden
Route map
Location

The Nehru Enclave metro station is located on the Magenta Line of the Delhi Metro. It was opened to public on 29 May 2018.

== The station ==
=== Station layout ===
G	Street Level	Exit/ Entrance
C	Concourse	Fare control, station agent, Ticket/token, shops
P	Platform 1 Eastbound	Towards → Botanical Garden; Next Station: Kalkaji Mandir Change at the next station for Violet Line
P	Island platform | Doors will open on the right
P	Platform 2 Westbound	Towards ← Inderlok; Next Station: Greater Kailash

== Entry/exit ==
Nehru Enclave metro station Entry/exits
Gate No-1	Gate No-2	Gate No-3	Gate No-4	Gate No-5

== Connections ==
=== Bus ===
Delhi Transport Corporation bus routes number 8A, 306, 427, 442, 445A, 445STL, 447, 492, 493, 511, 511A, 529SPL, 534, 534A, 544A, 567A, 568A, 724, 764, 764EXT, 774, 874, AC-534, AC-724, serves the station from nearby Nehru Place Terminal bus stop.

== See also ==
- Delhi
- List of Delhi Metro stations
- Transport in Delhi
- Delhi Metro Rail Corporation
- Delhi Suburban Railway
- Delhi Monorail
- Delhi Transport Corporation
- South East Delhi
- Nehru Place
- Okhla Sanctuary
- Okhla railway station
- National Capital Region (India)
- List of rapid transit systems
- List of metro systems
