= Govindpuri metro station =

Metro station in Delhi, India

Govindpuri

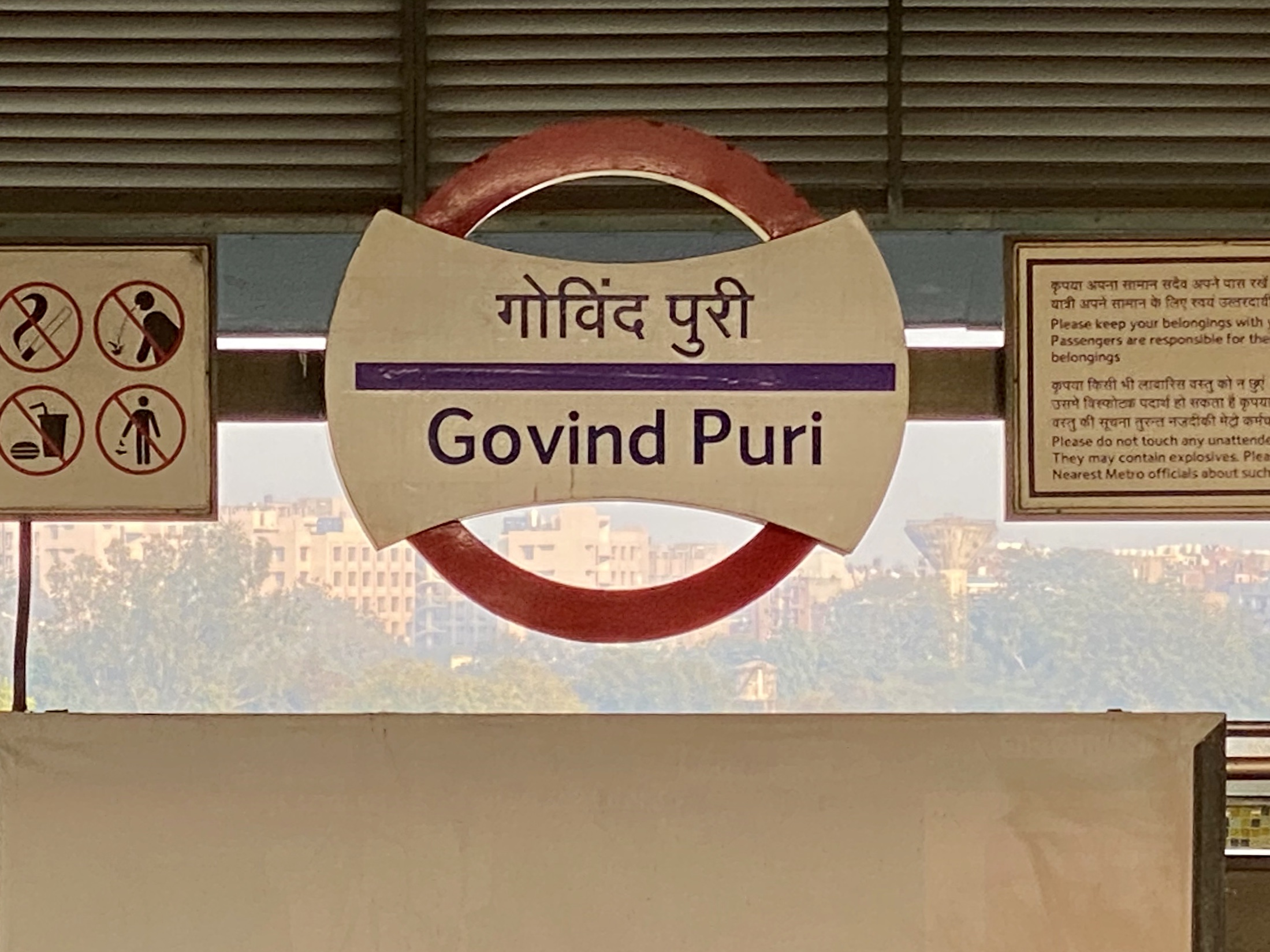

General information
- Location: Ma Anandmayee Marg, Govind Puri, New Delhi, Delhi, 110019
- Coordinates: 28°32′41″N 77°15′51″E
- System: Delhi Metro station
- Owner: Delhi Metro
- Operator: Delhi Metro Rail Corporation (DMRC)
- Line: Violet Line
- Platforms: Side platform; Platform-1 → Raja Nahar Singh (Ballabhgarh); Platform-2 → Kashmere Gate
- Tracks: 2

Construction
- Structure type: Elevated, Double-track
- Platform levels: 2
- Parking: Available
- Accessible: Yes

Other information
- Status: Staffed, Operational
- Station code: GDPI

History
- Opened: 3 October 2010; 15 years ago
- Electrified: 25 kV 50 Hz AC through overhead catenary

Passengers
- Jan 2015: 24,739/day 766,911/ Month average

Services
Preceding station	Delhi Metro	Following station
Kalkaji Mandir towards Kashmere Gate	Violet Line	Harkesh Nagar Okhla towards Raja Nahar Singh (Ballabhgarh)
Route map
Location

Govindpuri is a Delhi Metro station in Delhi. It is located between Kalkaji Mandir and Harkesh Nagar Okhla stations on the Violet Line. The station was opened with the first section of the Line on 3 October 2010, in time for the Commonwealth Games opening ceremony on the same day.

== The station ==
=== Station layout ===
L2	Side platform | Doors will open on the left
L2	Platform 1 Southbound	Towards → Raja Nahar Singh (Ballabhgarh); Next Station: Harkesh Nagar Okhla
L2	Platform 2 Northbound	Towards ← Kashmere Gate; Next Station: Kalkaji Mandir Change at the next station for Magenta Line
L2	Side platform | Doors will open on the left
L1	Concourse	Fare control, station agent, Metro Card vending machines, crossover
G	Street Level	Exit/Entrance

=== Facilities ===
List of available ATM at Govindpuri metro station are State Bank of India, Yes Bank, Canara Bank

== Entry/Exit ==
Govindpuri metro station Entry/exits
Gate No-1	Gate No-2

== Connections ==
=== Bus ===
Delhi Transport Corporation bus routes number 8A, 47A, 47ACL, 311A, 411, 411LnkSTL, 411STL, 429, 433, 433A, 433LnkSTL, 445A, 445STL, 463, 469, 480, 511, 511A, 764EXT, 774, 874, Crossings Republik - Golf Course Road Gurugram, Noida City Center - Cyber City, OMS (+) (-), OMS (+) AC serves the station from outside metro station stop.

Good place to visit Govindpuri, Kalka ji, Sangam vihar

== See also ==
- Delhi
- Govindpuri
- List of Delhi Metro stations
- Transport in Delhi
- Delhi Metro Rail Corporation
- Delhi Suburban Railway
- Delhi Monorail
- Delhi Transport Corporation
- South East Delhi
- New Delhi
- National Capital Region (India)
- List of rapid transit systems
- List of metro systems
