= Moolchand metro station =

Metro station in Delhi, India

Moolchand

General information
- Location: Lala Lajpat Rai Marg, Moolchand, New Delhi, Delhi, 110024, India
- Coordinates: 28°33′50″N 77°14′03″E
- System: Delhi Metro station
- Owner: Delhi Metro
- Line: Violet Line
- Platforms: Side platform; Platform-1 → Raja Nahar Singh (Ballabhgarh); Platform-2 → Kashmere Gate
- Tracks: 2

Construction
- Structure type: Elevated
- Platform levels: 2
- Parking: Available
- Accessible: Yes

Other information
- Station code: MLCD

History
- Opened: 3 October 2010; 15 years ago
- Electrified: 25 kV 50 Hz AC through overhead catenary

Passengers
- 322,417: 10,401 (As of Jan 2015)

Services
Preceding station	Delhi Metro	Following station
Lajpat Nagar towards Kashmere Gate	Violet Line	Kailash Colony towards Raja Nahar Singh (Ballabhgarh)
Route map
Location

Moolchand is a Delhi Metro station in Delhi. It is located between Lajpat Nagar and Kailash Colony stations on the Violet Line. The station was opened with the first section of the Line on 3 October 2010 in time for the Commonwealth Games opening ceremony on the same day. The station, being nearby to several schools like Kendriya Vidyalaya and Frank Anthony, is frequently used by school children who come from far away places.

== Station layout ==
L2	Side platform | Doors will open on the left
L2	Platform 1 Southbound	Towards → Raja Nahar Singh (Ballabhgarh); Next Station: Kailash Colony
L2	Platform 2 Northbound	Towards ← Kashmere Gate; Next Station: Lajpat Nagar Change at the next station for Pink Line
L2	Side platform | Doors will open on the left
L1	Concourse	Fare control, station agent, Metro Card vending machines, crossover
G	Street level	Exit/Entrance

== Facilities ==
Available ATMs at Moolchand metro station are HDFC, Ratnakar Bank, PNB and SBI

== Nearby ==
Moolchand Medcity Hospital, Defence Colony, Andrews Ganj, Acharya Munir Ashram, Rajkumari Amrit Kaur College of Nursing, Haldiram, The Japan Foundation, Guru Nanak Market,

== Connections ==
Buses and rickshaws connect the station to nearby destinations.

== See also ==
- List of Delhi Metro stations
- Transport in Delhi
- Delhi Metro Rail Corporation
- Delhi Suburban Railway
