= Bhookailas =

Bhookailas means Mount Kailash on the Bhoomi (Earth). It may also refer to:

- Bhookailas (1940 film), a Telugu film of AVM Productions starring Subbaiah Naidu
- Bhookailasa (film), a 1958 Kannada film starring Rajkumar
- Bhookailas (1958 film), a Telugu film of AVM Productions starring N. T. Rama Rao
- Bhookailas (2007 film), a Telugu comedy film based on the real estate business in Hyderabad

== See also ==
- Kailash (disambiguation)
