= Terraces (Baháʼí) =

Garden terraces around the Shrine of the Báb on Mount Carmel in Haifa, Israel

Coordinates: 32°48′52″N 34°59′13″E

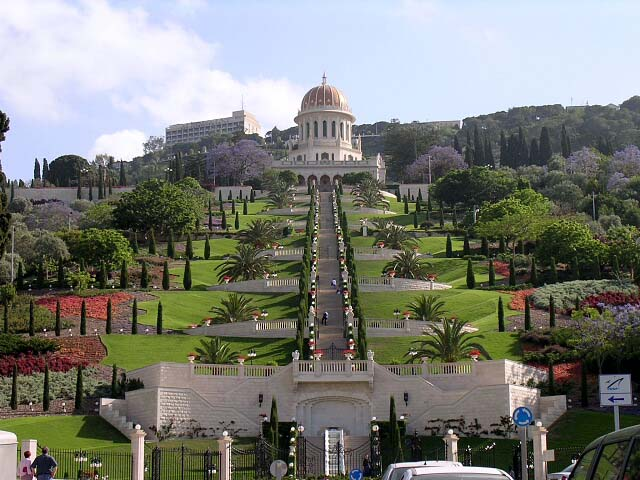
The Shrine of the Báb and its terraces

The Baháʼí Terraces, or the Hanging Gardens of Haifa, are garden terraces on Mount Carmel in Haifa, and one of the most popular tourist destinations in Israel. Completed in 2001, there are 19 terraces and more than 1,500 steps ascending the mountain. The central terrace is highlighted by the Shrine of the Báb, one of the main religious sites of the Baháʼí Faith. The site's architect was Fariborz Sahba, and the structural engineers were Karban and Co. from Haifa.

The terraces are part of a complex of Baháʼí holy places in Haifa, Acre, and western Galilee inscribed as a UNESCO World Heritage Site in July 2008.

The gardens rest in the neighborhoods of Wadi Nisnas and Hadar HaCarmel.

== Symbolism ==
The terraces represent the first eighteen disciples of the Báb, who were designated "Letters of the Living", although no terraces are connected with particular individuals.

== Design ==
Nine concentric circles provide the main geometry of the eighteen terraces. Just as the identification of a circle presupposes a centre, so the terraces have been conceived as generated from the Shrine of the Báb. The eighteen terraces plus the one terrace of the Shrine of the Báb make nineteen terraces total. Nineteen is a significant number within both the Baháʼí and Bábí religions.

The gardens have elements of the Persian gardens of Shiraz, Iran, the Nishat Bagh gardens of Jammu and Kashmir, India and English gardens, isolating the site from the noise of the surroundings and connecting the different Baháʼí buildings on Mount Carmel together.

Fariborz Sahba began work in 1987 designing the gardens and oversaw construction. The terraces were opened to the public in June 2001.. Beginning at its base, the gardens extend almost one kilometre (0.6 miles) up the side of Mount Carmel, covering some 200,000 square metres (2,152,782 square feet) of land. The gardens are linked by a set of stairs flanked by twin streams of running water cascading down the mountainside through the steps and terrace bridges.

== Water and ecology ==
The irrigation system includes a computer which, based on meteorologic data it receives, controls hundreds of valves to distribute water throughout the gardens by sprinkling and dripping. This is done at night and in the early morning, to avoid wasting water by evaporation. The water that flows alongside the stairs is circulating in a closed system within each terrace, so that little water is wasted.

== Tourism ==
In 2013, 917,031 tourists and 8,000 Baháʼí pilgrims visited the gardens.

Haifa's Mayor Amram Mitzna described the gardens as the eighth wonder of the world. "We have been very lucky," he said, "not many cities get a park that is so incredibly beautiful – free of charge."

== Gallery ==
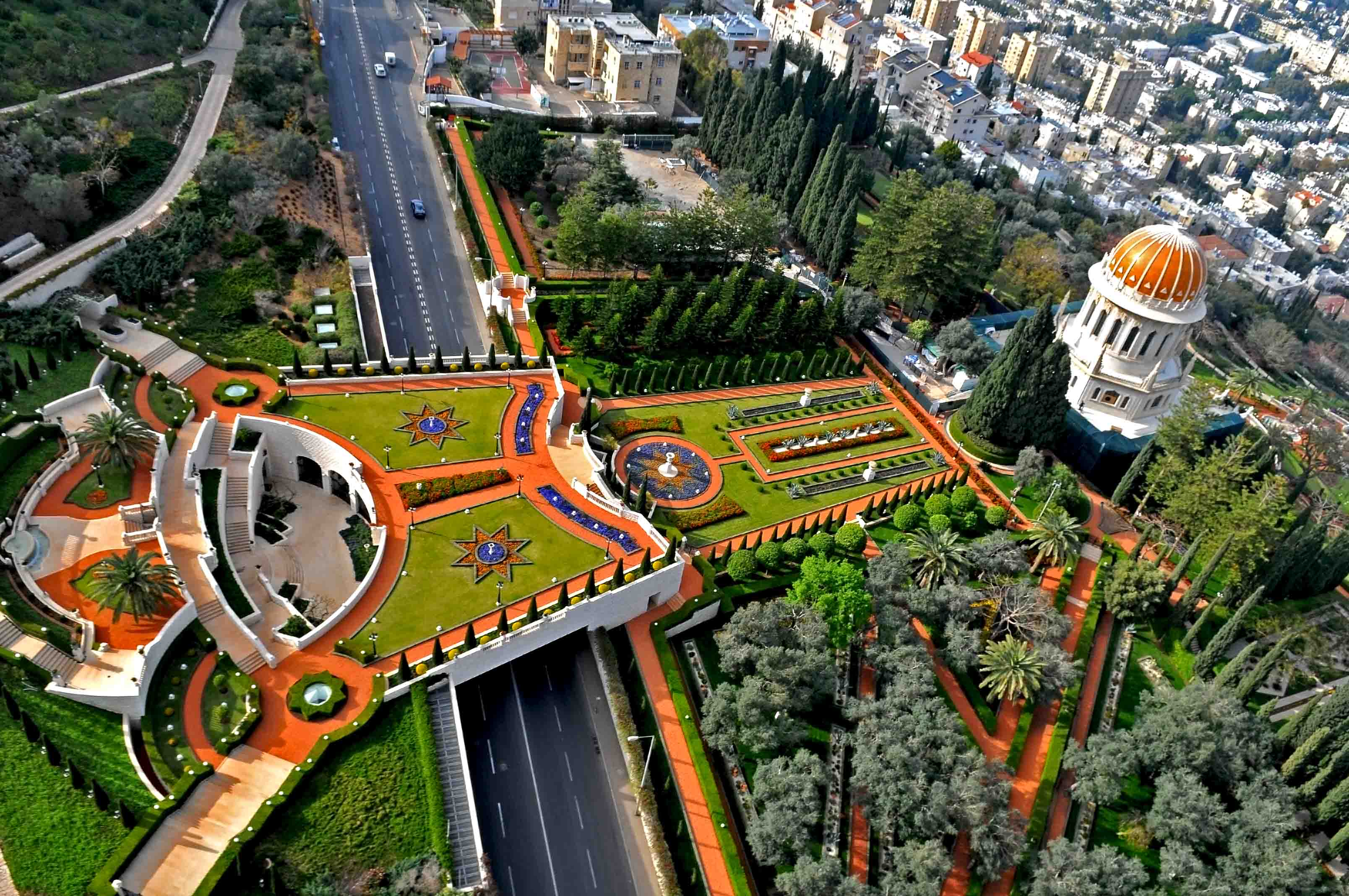
Aerial view of the bridge terrace behind the Shrine of the Báb

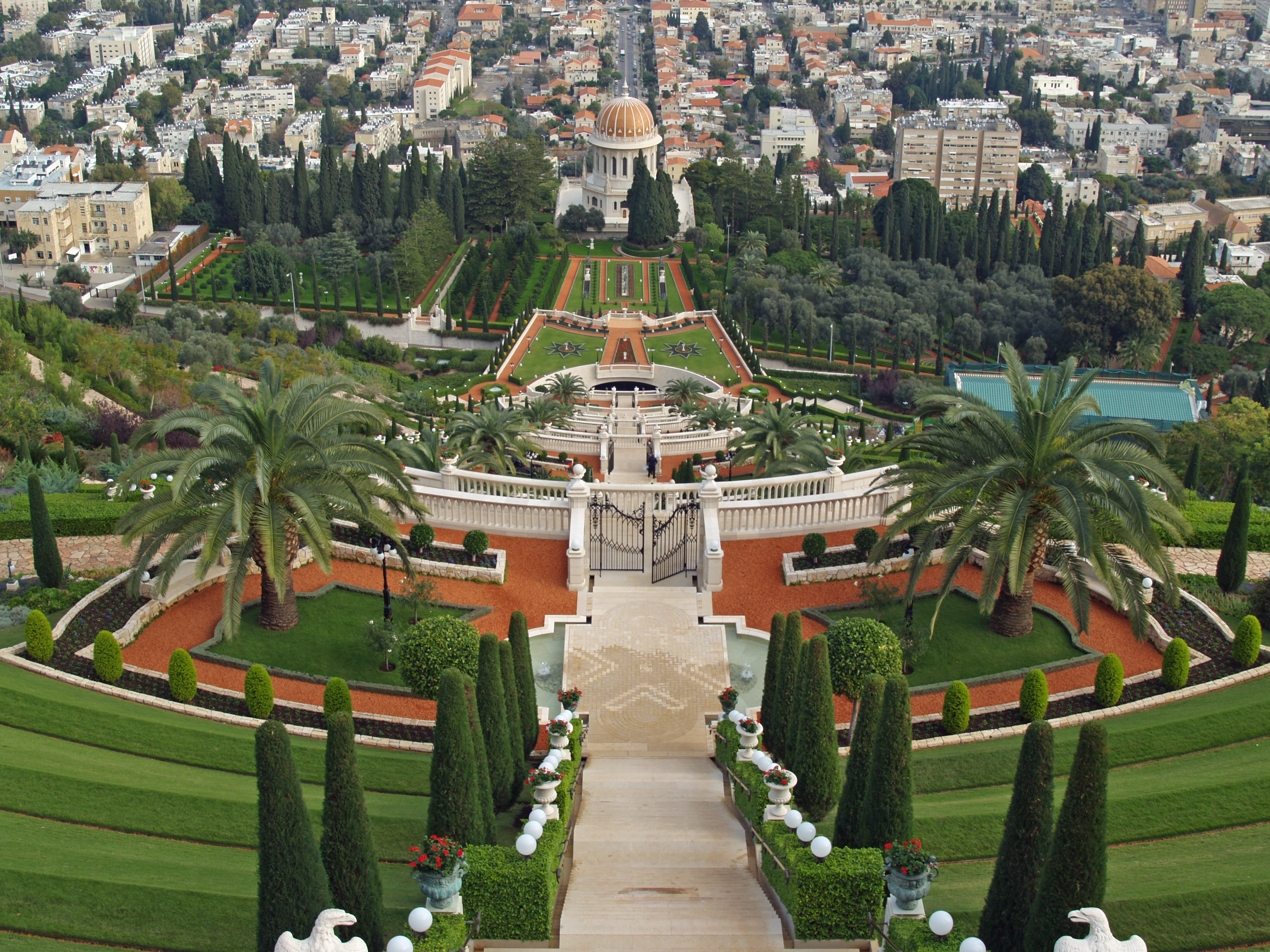
Downward view of the upper terraces

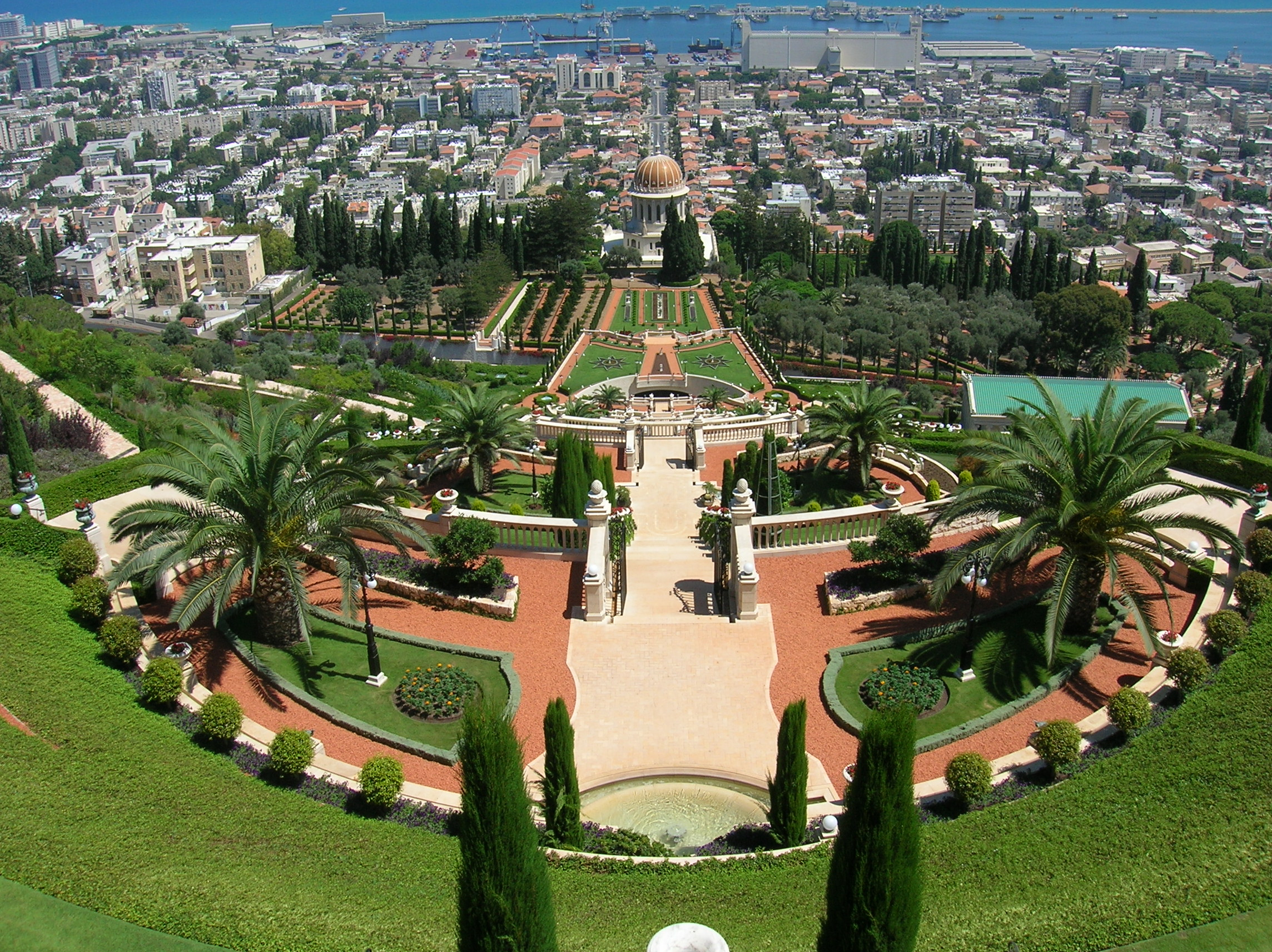
Downward view of the upper terraces

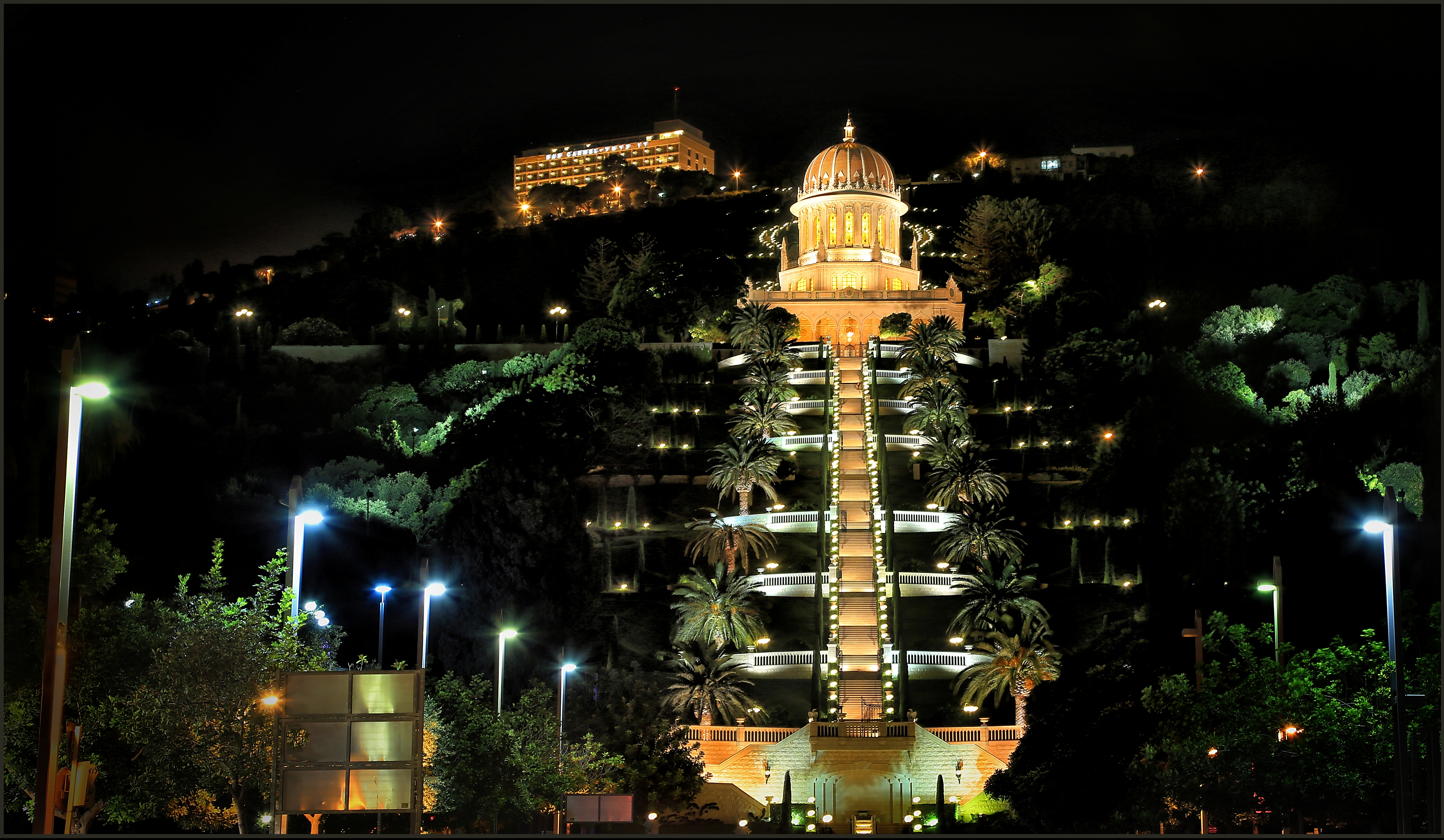
Terraces at night

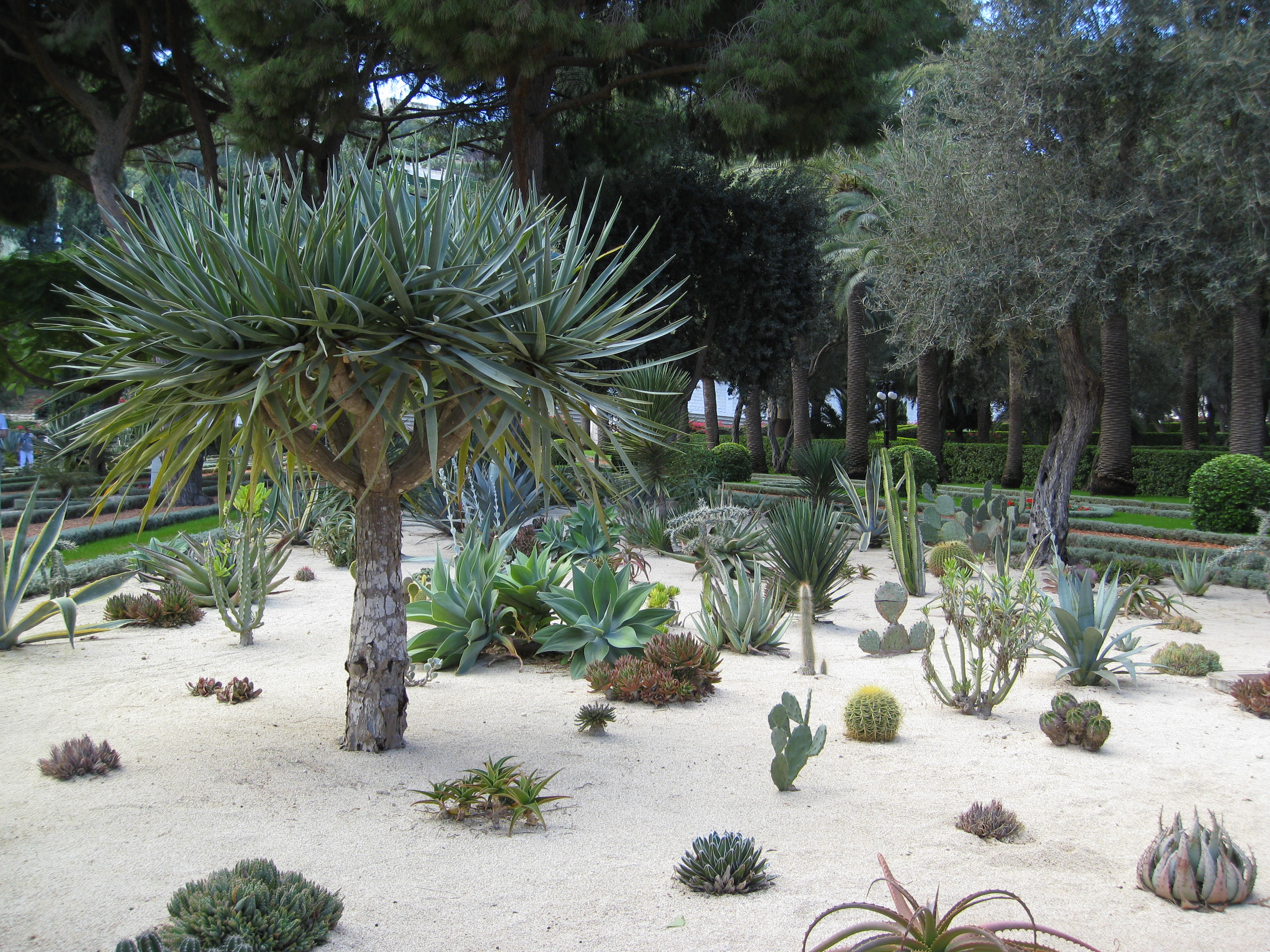
Succulent garden near the Shrine of the Báb

== See also ==
- Shrine of Baháʼu'lláh
- Tourism in Israel
