= Kailashey Kelenkari =

Kailashey Kelenkari (lit. 'Kailash Scam') may refer to:

- Kailashey Kelenkari (novel), a 1973 novel by Satyajit Ray
- Kailashey Kelenkari (film), a 2007 film directed by Sandip Ray, based on the novel

== See also ==
- Kailash (disambiguation)
