= Nehru Place metro station =

Metro station in Delhi, India

Nehru Place

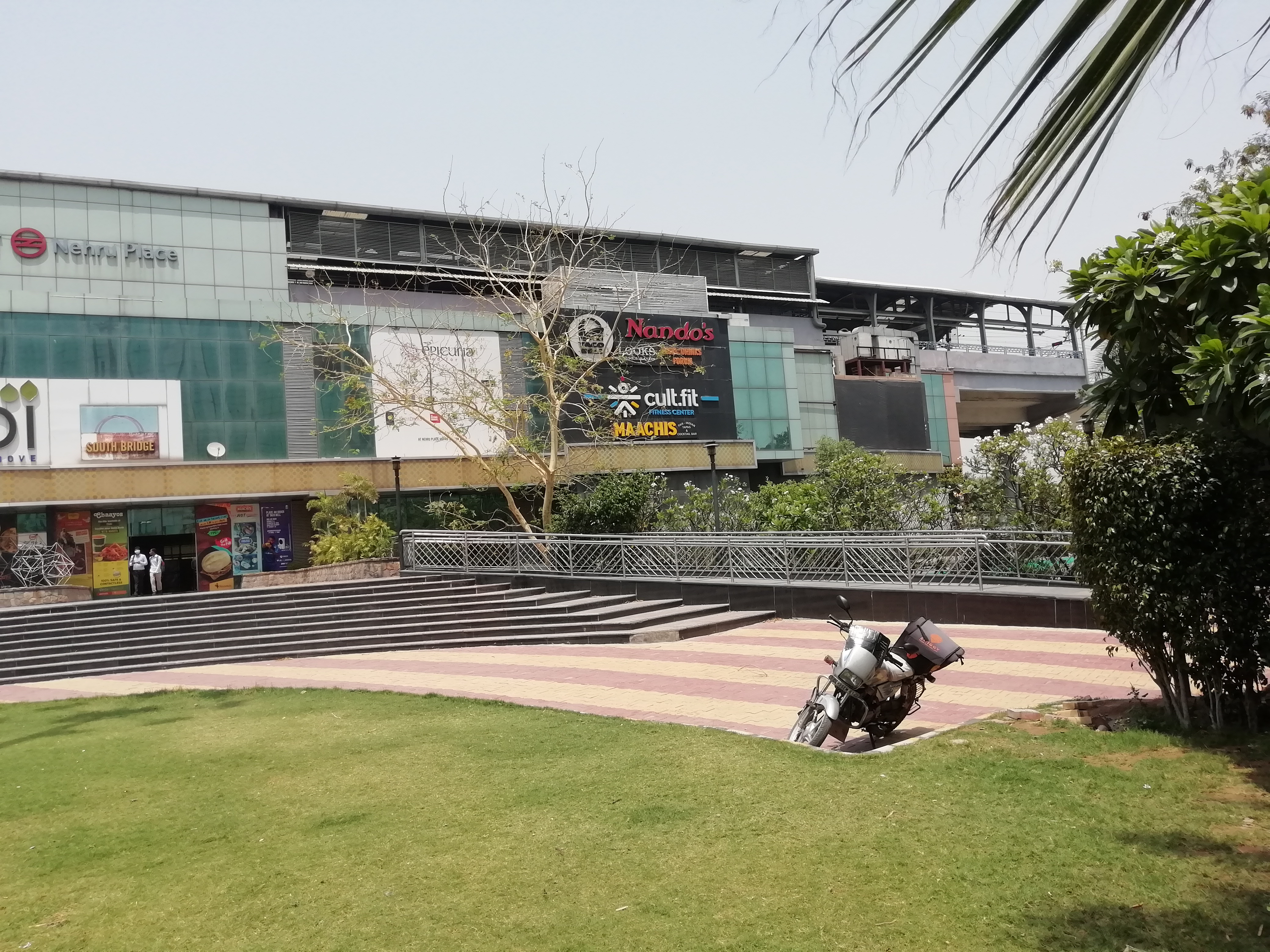

General information
- Location: Nehru Place, New Delhi, 110019
- Coordinates: 28°33′05″N 77°15′06″E
- System: Delhi Metro station
- Owner: Delhi Metro
- Line: Violet Line
- Platforms: Side platform; Platform-1 → Raja Nahar Singh (Ballabhgarh); Platform-2 → Kashmere Gate
- Tracks: 2

Construction
- Structure type: Elevated
- Platform levels: 2
- Parking: Available
- Accessible: Yes

Other information
- Station code: NP

History
- Opened: 3 October 2010; 15 years ago
- Electrified: 25 kV 50 Hz AC through overhead catenary

Passengers
- 594,566: 19,180 (As of Jan 2015)

Services
| Preceding station | Delhi Metro | Following station |
|---|---|---|
| Kailash Colony towards Kashmere Gate | Violet Line | Kalkaji Mandir towards Raja Nahar Singh (Ballabhgarh) |
Route map
Location

Nehru Place is a Delhi Metro station in Delhi. It is located between Kailash Colony and Kalkaji Mandir stations on the Violet Line. The station was opened with the first section of the Line on 3 October 2010, in time for the 2010 Commonwealth Games opening ceremony on the same day. It caters to Nehru Place business centre, Kalkaji and Chittaranjan Park area. Yes Bank is also available to near this metro station.

== Station layout ==
| L2 | Side platform | Doors will open on the left |
| L2 | Platform 1 Southbound | Towards → Raja Nahar Singh (Ballabhgarh); Next Station: Kalkaji Mandir Change at the next station for Magenta Line |
| L2 | Platform 2 Northbound | Towards ← Kashmere Gate; Next Station: Kailash Colony |
| L2 | Side platform | Doors will open on the left |
| L1 | Concourse | Fare control, station agent, Metro Card vending machines, crossover |
| G | Street Level | Exit/Entrance |

== Facilities ==
Several ATMs are available at Nehru Place metro station.

== Connections ==
Delhi Metro feeder bus service available to Malviya Nagar metro station situated on Yellow Line of Delhi Metro.

== See also ==
- List of Delhi Metro stations
- Transport in Delhi
- Delhi Metro Rail Corporation
- Delhi Suburban Railway
