= Greater Kailash metro station =

Metro station in Delhi, India

Greater Kailash

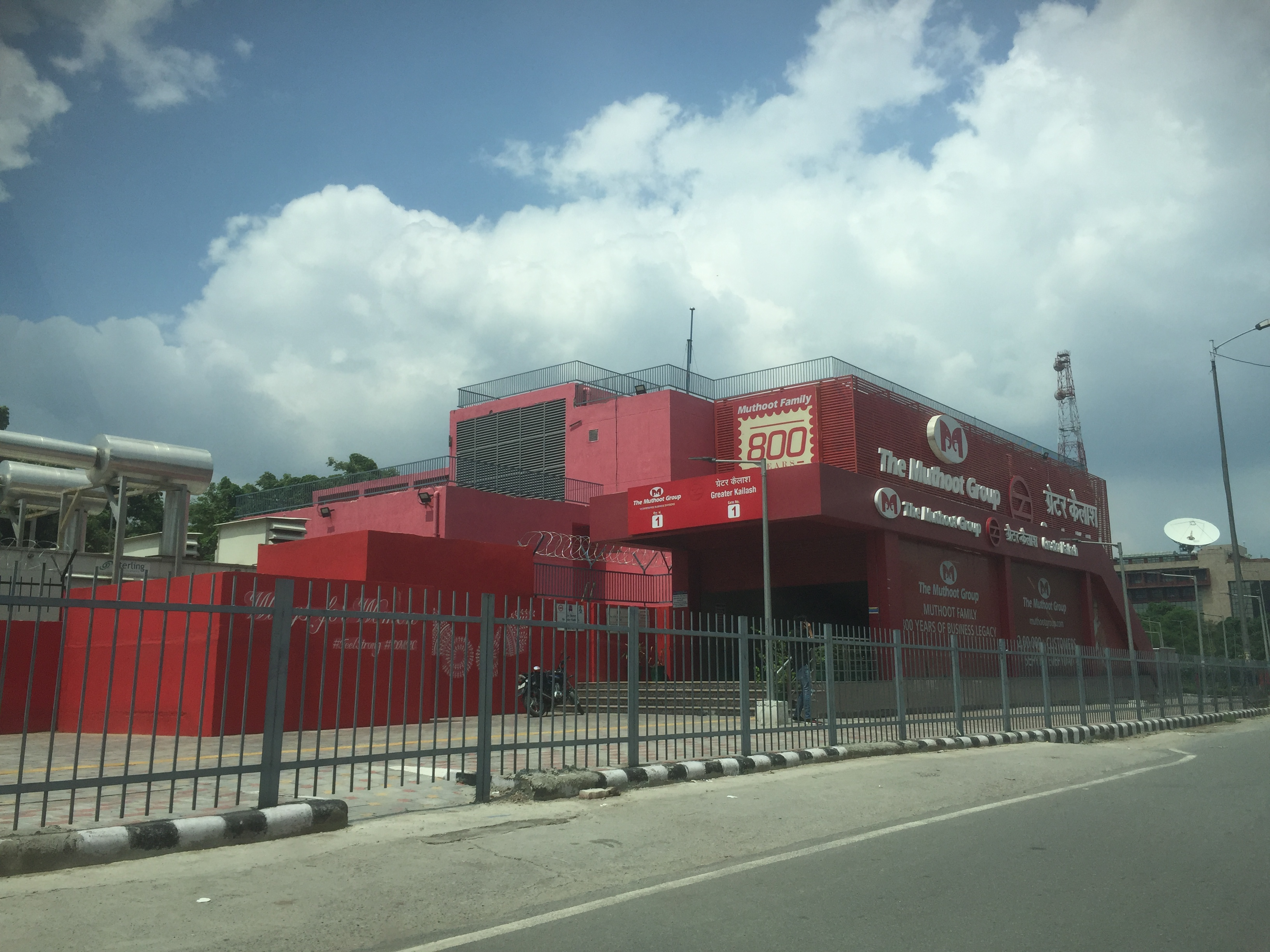

General information
- Location: Masjid Moth, Greater Kailash, New Delhi, 110048
- Coordinates: 28°32′31″N 77°14′18″E
- System: Delhi Metro station
- Owner: Delhi Metro
- Operator: Delhi Metro Rail Corporation (DMRC)
- Line: Magenta Line
- Platforms: Island platform Platform-1 → Botanical Garden; Platform-2 → Inderlok
- Tracks: 2

Construction
- Structure type: Underground, Double-track
- Platform levels: 2
- Accessible: Yes

Other information
- Status: Staffed, Operational
- Station code: GKEI

History
- Opened: 29 May 2018; 8 years ago
- Electrified: 25 kV 50 Hz AC through overhead catenary

Services
Preceding station	Delhi Metro	Following station
Chirag Delhi towards Inderlok	Magenta Line	Nehru Enclave towards Botanical Garden
Route map
Location

The Greater Kailash metro station is located on the Magenta Line of the Delhi Metro. It was opened to public on 29 May 2018.

== The station ==
=== Station layout ===
G	Street Level	Exit/ Entrance
C	Concourse	Fare control, station agent, Ticket/token, shops
P	Platform 1 Eastbound	Towards → Botanical Garden; Next Station: Nehru Enclave
P	Island platform | Doors will open on the right
P	Platform 2 Westbound	Towards ← Inderlok; Next Station: Chirag Delhi

== Entry/exit ==
Greater Kailash metro station Entry/exits
Gate No-1	Gate No-2	Gate No-3
Masjid Moth	Greater Kailash Enclave 1	Savitri Cinema Complex
DDA Flats	Pumposh Enclave	Greater Kailash Enclave 2
BSES Office	TCIL Building	CR Park

== Connections ==
=== Bus ===
Delhi Transport Corporation bus routes number 427, 490, 493, 511, 511A, 534, 534A, 540, 540ACL, 540CL, 544A, 724C, 764, 764EXT, 764S, 774, AC-534, AC-764 serves the station from nearby Savitri Cinema Bus Stand bus stop.

== See also ==
- Delhi
- List of Delhi Metro stations
- Transport in Delhi
- Delhi Metro Rail Corporation
- Delhi Suburban Railway
- Delhi Monorail
- Delhi Transport Corporation
- South East Delhi
- Greater Kailash
- National Capital Region (India)
- List of rapid transit systems
- List of metro systems
