= Kailash Colony metro station =

Metro station in Delhi, India

Kailash Colony

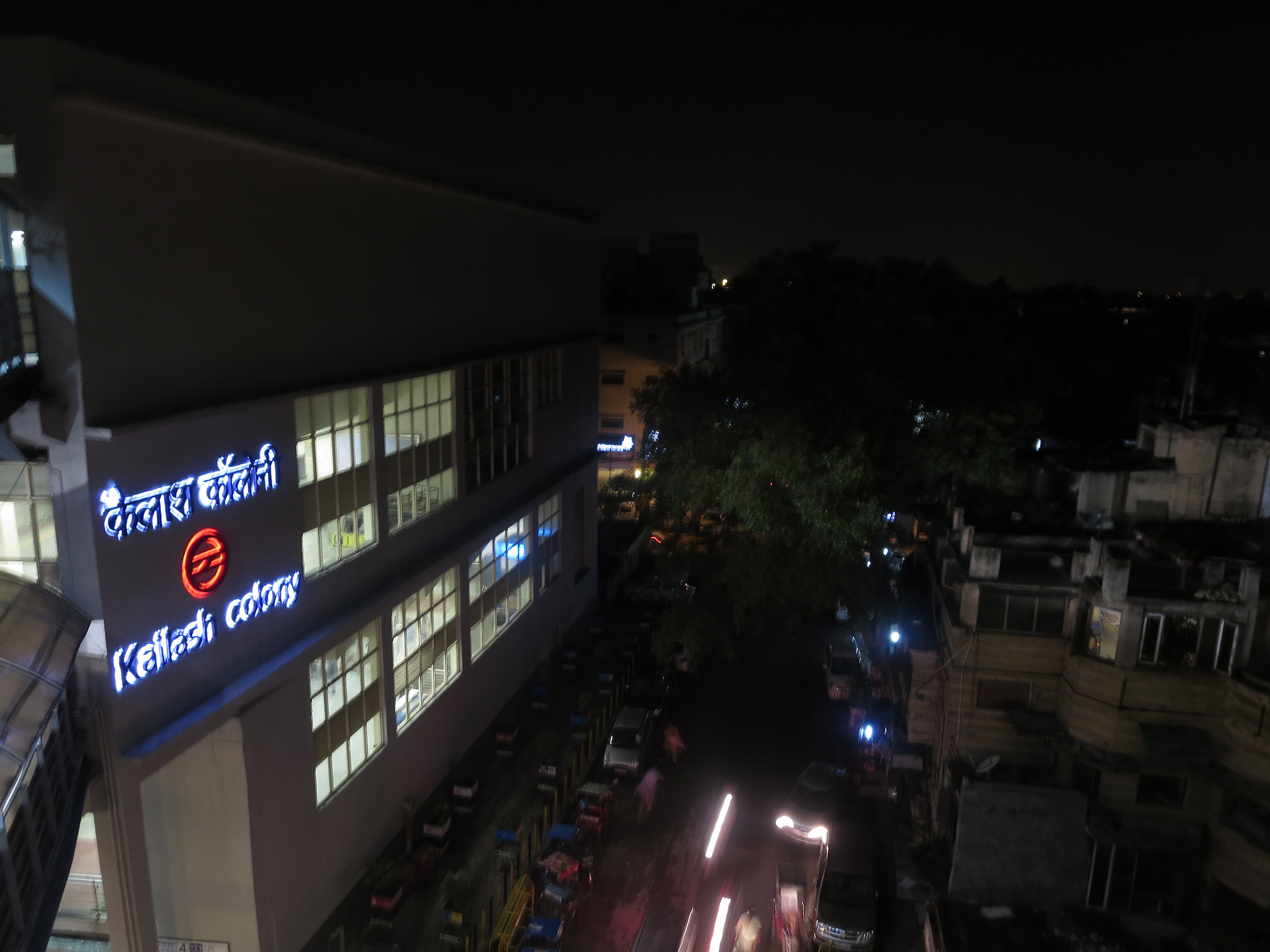
- Kailash Colony Metro Station

General information
- Location: Lala Lajpat Rai Rd, Block A, Kailash Colony, New Delhi 110048
- Coordinates: 28°33′19″N 77°14′31″E
- System: Delhi Metro station
- Owner: Delhi Metro
- Line: Violet Line
- Platforms: Side platform; Platform-1 → Raja Nahar Singh (Ballabhgarh); Platform-2 → Kashmere Gate
- Tracks: 2

Construction
- Structure type: Elevated
- Platform levels: 2
- Accessible: Yes

Other information
- Station code: KHCY

History
- Opened: 3 October 2010; 15 years ago
- Electrified: 25 kV 50 Hz AC through overhead catenary

Passengers
- 349,552: 11,276 (As of Jan 2015)

Services
| Preceding station | Delhi Metro | Following station |
|---|---|---|
| Moolchand towards Kashmere Gate | Violet Line | Nehru Place towards Raja Nahar Singh (Ballabhgarh) |
Route map
Location

Kailash Colony is a Delhi Metro station in Delhi. It is located between Moolchand and Nehru Place stations on the Violet Line. The station was opened with the first section of the Line on 3 October 2010, in time for the Commonwealth Games opening ceremony on the same day.

== Station layout ==
| L2 | Side platform | Doors will open on the left |
| L2 | Platform 1 Southbound | Towards → Raja Nahar Singh (Ballabhgarh); Next Station: Nehru Place |
| L2 | Platform 2 Northbound | Towards ← Kashmere Gate; Next Station: Moolchand |
| L2 | Side platform | Doors will open on the left |
| L1 | Concourse | Fare control, station agent, Metro Card vending machines, crossover |
| G | Street Level | Exit/Entrance |

== Facilities ==
List of available ATM at Kailash Colony metro station are

== See also ==
- List of Delhi Metro stations
- Transport in Delhi
- Delhi Metro Rail Corporation
- Delhi Suburban Railway
