= Govindpuri =

Govindpuri Kalkaji's Twin
- Residential Colony
- Govindpuri
- Location in Delhi, India
- Coordinates: 28.5354°N 77.2639°E
- Country: India
- State: Delhi
- District: South east Delhi

Government
  - Body: Municipal Corporation Of Delhi

Languages
  - Official: Hindi, English, Punjabi, Urdu
- Time zone: UTC+5:30 (IST)
- PIN: 110019
- Vehicle registration: DL3C
- Government Bodies: Residents welfare association & SDMC
- Civic agency: MCD

Govindpuri is a colony in South East Delhi. It is surrounded by Kalkaji, Chittaranjan Park, and Tughlakabad. The Violet Line of the Delhi Metro passes through the area and has a metro station by the name, Govindpuri. Govindpuri is supposedly reformed on a small hill, which was previously part of a cemetery.

== Constituency ==
=== Lok Sabha Constituency ===
Govindpuri comes under South Delhi (Lok Sabha constituency). MP of the area was Ramesh Bidhuri.

=== Vidhan Sabha Constituency ===
It comes under Kalkaji Delhi Assembly Constituency. The MLA of the area is Atishi Marlena.

== Academic Institutions Nearby ==
1. Acharya Narendra Dev College, Delhi University
2. Dashmesh Public School, Gali No. 7
3. Deshbandhu College, Delhi University
4. Ramanujan College, Delhi University
5. Indraprastha Institute of Information and Technology, Delhi
