= Kalkaji Mandir =

Temple in South Delhi, India

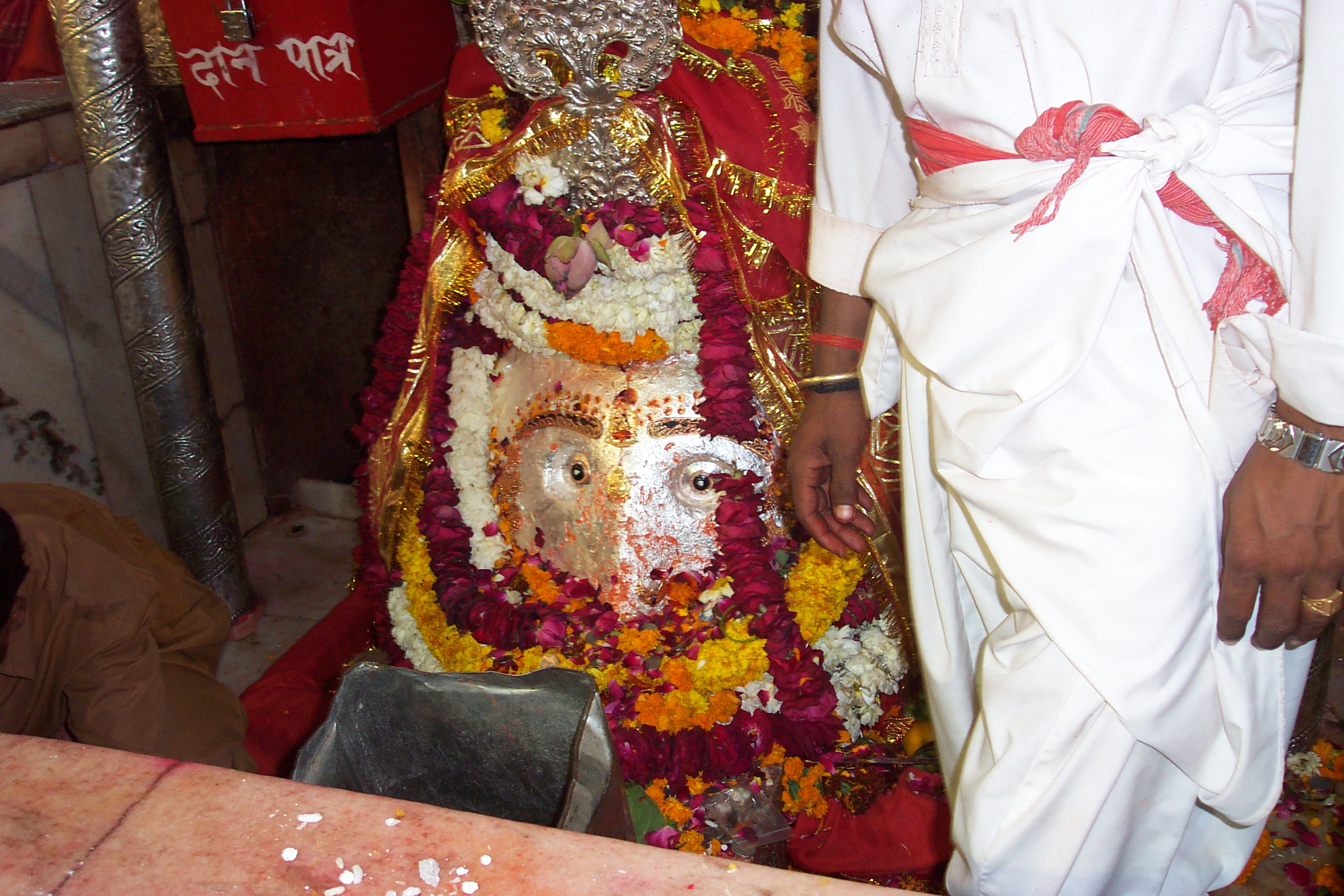
- Idol of Kali at the Kalkaji Mandir

Religion
- Affiliation: Hinduism
- District: South Delhi
- Deity: Kali- काली, Kalka - कालका

Location
- Location: Kalkaji, South Delhi
- State: Delhi
- Country: India
- Interactive map of Kalkaji Mandir
- Coordinates: 28°32′59″N 77°15′39″E

Architecture
- Type: Hindu temple architecture
- Temple: 1

Website
- www.shrikalkajimandir.in

Kalkaji Mandir is a Hindu temple dedicated to Kali, a Hindu goddess. It is in southern Delhi, in Kalkaji, a place whose name derives from the temple. The temple is located opposite Nehru Place.

== Mythological Origin ==
According to locals, the story of this temple goes all the way back to the Satya Yuga (the first age of the world in Hindu tradition). Regional legend states that gods inhabiting region sought intervention from Brahma against terrorizing demons including Raktabija. Brahma declined to intervene directly against the demons and instead directed the gods to Parvati. From Parvati emerged Goddess Kaushiki to battle the demons. However, as the demon Raktabija's blood fell upon the earth, each drop give birth to new demons, placing Kaushiki at a severe disadvantage. In response, Kali emerged from Kaushiki's eyebrows. Characterized in traditional accounts as a cosmic figure whose jaw spanned from the hills to the sky, Kali consumed the slain demon's blood before it reached the ground to prevent the new birth of demons and securing ultimate victory for the divine forces.

== History ==
=== Pre- Mughal and Ashokan sacred geography ===
Archaeological evidence confirms that the ridge on which Kalkaji Mandir sits has an active human and commercial corridor since antiquity. The discovery of a Minor Rock Edict of Ashoka at nearby Bahapur in 1966 by the Archaeological Survey of India dates human activity and imperial inscriptions in the immediate vicinity to 3rd century BCE.

=== Late Mughal and Maratha rebuilding ===
Although the Kalkaji temple is believed to be much older, the older remaining portions of the building go back to 18th century. The core structure was built no earlier than 1764 AD. Later, around 1783, a prominent figure name Durga Singh made major enhancements to the shrine. He enclosed the central deity on three sides with red sandstone and six foot tall marble railings. He also installed two inscriptions- one in Persian and one in Hindi which state the name of the goddess and his as the builder of the screen.

=== Colonial Period and 19th Century Additions ===
In 1816, the temple priests wanted to add a dome, but local funding was low. To decide who should pay for it, they placed slips of paper with the names of Delhi's wealthiest Hindu gentlemen before the Kali to choose a benefactor.

The divine choice fell on Mirza Raja Kidarnath, the Peshkar of Akbar II. He funded the project adding twelve outer rooms each with three doors and topping the temple with a tall, pyramidal dome. He also added two red sandstone tigers with a worship bell hanging above them and a large red-sandstone trident nearby. Over the next 50 years, local Hindu merchants and bankers built additional rooms around the complex.

According to a Hindu legend, Kalika Devi was born at the site where the temple is situated.

== Structure ==
The temple architecture is believed to be in Maratha Mughal style. The temple is a massive, pyramid-shaped structure centered around a 12-sided chamber measuring approximately 24 feet (7.3 m) across, featuring smooth marble flooring and a doorway on each side. Encircling this main hall is a 9 foot wide verandah framed by 36 scalloped, arched openings. Directly opposite the east doorway on the verandah sits red sandstone pedestal with two figures and a central stone statue of Kali accompanied by a trishul (trident).The surrounding courtyard accommodates a hawan shala (fire ritual space), a sacred Neem tree and a Tulsi plant. There are small shrines of other deities like Shiva, Hanuman, Ganesha, Laxmi Narayan, Bhairon, Sita Ram.

== See also ==
- Kalka Cave Temple
