= Banhpur =

Banhpur Bahainpur
- Village
- Location within Uttar Pradesh Location within India
- Coordinates: 24.7132°N 78.7447°E
- Country: India
- State: Uttar Pradesh
- District: Bulandshahr
- Tehsil: Syana

Population (2011)
  - Total: 3,340

Language
  - Official: Hindi
- Time zone: UTC+5:30 (IST)

Banhpur (also known as Bahainpur) is a village in Bulandshahr district of the Indian state of Uttar Pradesh. It comes under Siana tehsil.

It belongs to Meerut Division. It is located 409 km north from district headquarter Bulandshahr. 9 km from B B Nagar. 420 km from Lucknoow, Hingbara (3.5 km), Takrarpur Ladpor (4.1 km) are the nearby villages to Banhpur. Banhpur is surrounded by Simbhawali Block towards north, Siana Block towards east, Garh Mukteshwar Block towards north and Hapur Block is towards west.

Hapur, Pilkhuwa, Bulandshahr, Siana, BB Nagar, Gulaothi and Sikandrabad are nearby cities to Banhpur.

== Demographics ==
As of 2011 Indian Census, Banhpur village's total population was 3,340, of which 1,800 were males and 1,540 were females. The population between 0 and 6 years of age was 450. The total number of literates in Banhpur was 2147, which constituted 64.3%, of which male literary was 73.8% and female literacy was 53.1%. The effective literacy rate of 7+ population of Banhpur was 74.3%, of which male literacy rate was 86.1% and female literacy rate was 60.8%. The Scheduled Caste population was 1,355. The village had 618 households as of 2011.

== Language ==
Banhpur's official language is Hindi (Khadi Boli) .
