= Siana (disambiguation) =

Siana is a city in Uttar Pradesh, India.

Siana may also refer to:

- Syana Tehsil, in Uttar Pradesh, India
  - Syana (Assembly constituency)
- Siana, Rajasthan, a village in Rajasthan, India
- Siana, Greece, a settlement in Rhodes, Greece
- Siana, Asturias, a parish in Mieres, Asturias, Spain.
- Siana (given name)

== People with the surname ==
- Jolene Siana, American writer

== See also ==
- Siana cup, a type of Ancient Greek cup
- Syana (disambiguation)
