= Syana =

Syana may refer to:

- Siana, a city in Uttar Pradesh, India
  - Syana Tehsil
  - Syana (Assembly constituency)
- Kurilsk, formerly known as Syana, a town in Russia

== See also ==
- Siana (disambiguation)
