= Exhibition, Bulandshahr =

Exhibition, Bulandshahr Numaish, Bulandshahr
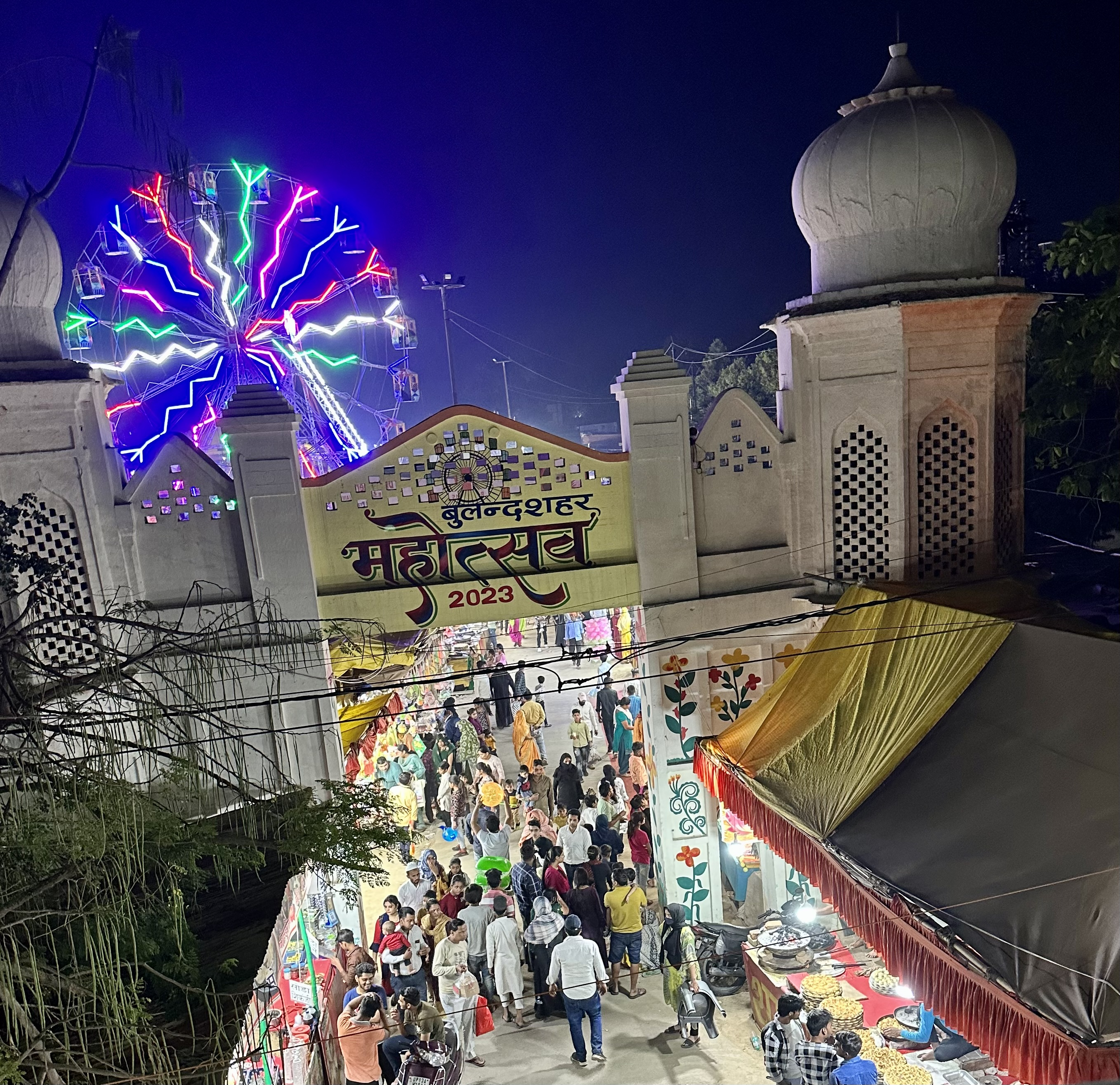
- Bulandshahr exhibition 2023
- Locations: Bulandshahr, Uttar Pradesh
- Country: India
- Inaugurated: 1873
- Founder: Willock
- Website: Official website

The annual exhibition at Bulandshahr, also known as Numaish ka mela, and Bulandshahr's Numaish, held around Holi, was founded as a horse fair in 1873 in the town of Bulandshahr, Uttar Pradesh, India, by the British Civil Servant Willock, the then collector of the district. (Note: Kuar Lachman Singh lists a H. D. Willock as a collector and magistarte at Bulandshahr from 17 April 1865 to at least 1874.)
