= Zafar H. Zaidi =

Pakistani scientific researcher and professor

Syed Zafar H. Zaidi Ph.D., D.Sc.
- سید ظفر حسنین زیدی
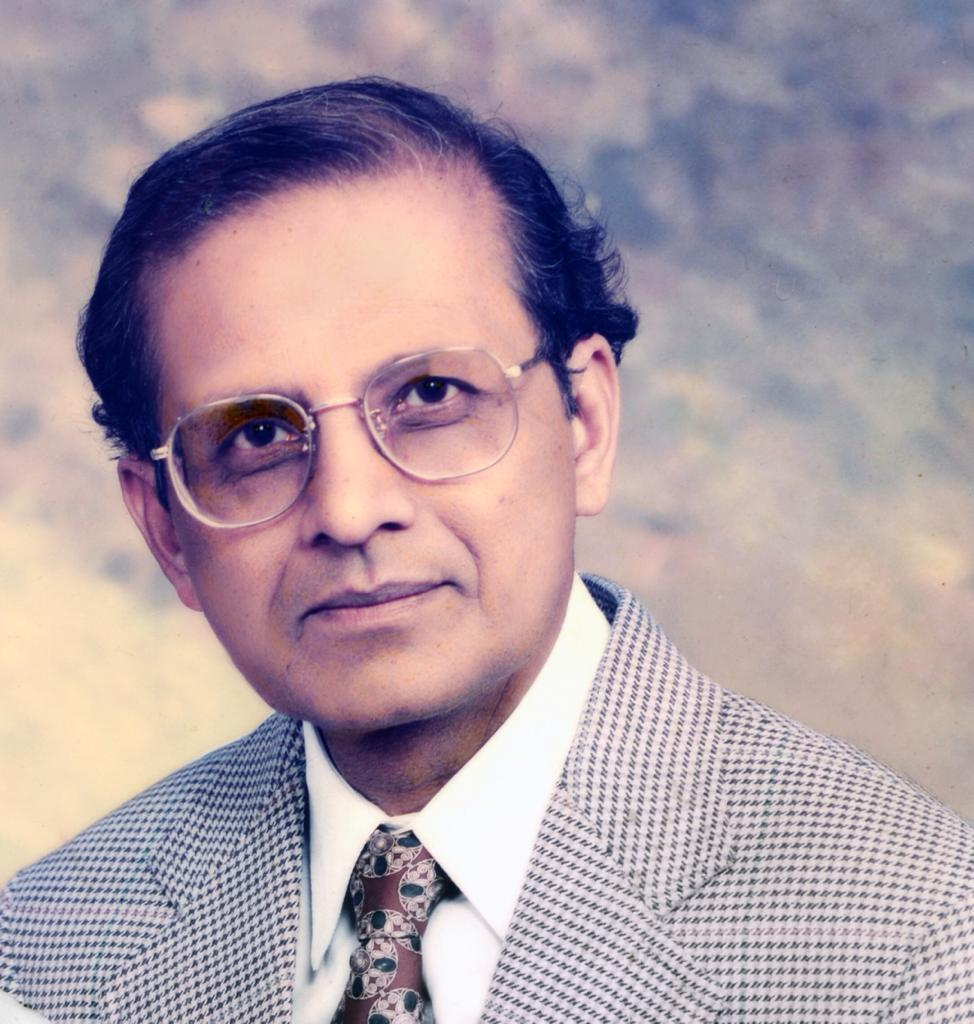
- Zaidi in 1990
- Born: Syed Zafar Hasnain Zaidi; 4 March 1939; Bulandshahr, Uttar Pradesh
- Died: 7 January 2001 (aged 61); Karachi, Pakistan
- Resting place: Karachi, Pakistan
- Education: University of Leeds, UK
- Spouse: Shahida Zaidi (1972 - 2001)
- Children: 3
- Scientific career
- Fields: Chemistry
- Thesis: Sulphur in Silk Fibroin from Bombyx Mori (1968)

Syed Zafar Hasnain Zaidi Urdu: سید ظفر حسنین زیدی (4 March 1939 – 7 January 2001) was a Pakistani scientific researcher, and professor who introduced the concept of Protein Chemistry in Pakistan. He served as Vice Chancellor of the University of Karachi, Pakistan. He was decorated twice by the Government of Pakistan for his contributions to Scientific Research in Pakistan, being awarded the Tamgha-e-Imtiaz in 1989 and the Sitar-e-Imtiaz in 1995. He was also awarded the Khwarizmi International Award in 1992 by the Government of Iran for his research in Science.

== Early years and education ==
Zafar Zaidi was born in 1939 in Bulandshahr, Uttar Pradesh, British India, to Syed Tahawar Ali Zaidi and his wife, Mubarak un Nisa. Following the partition of India, he migrated to Pakistan in 1947 and was brought up in Hyderabad. He completed his early education up to grade 12 in Hyderabad from Ghulam Hussain Hidayatullah School and Government College, Hyderabad (now Government College University, Hyderabad), Sindh.

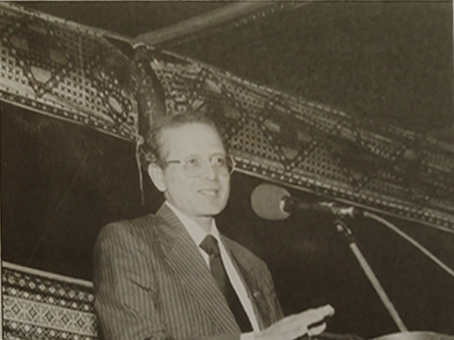
Zaidi lecturing at university 1999

Zaidi completed his Bachelor of Science with Honours (BSc. Hons.) from University of Sindh in Jamshoro in 1961, majoring in Chemistry. He went on to complete his Master of Science (MSc.) programme again from University of Sindh, Jamshoro in 1963 specializing in Physical Chemistry in which his academic research was entitled Basic Strength of 2 Methyl Indole. He then proceeded to the United Kingdom for his Doctoral education and completed his PhD. in 1968 in the field of protein chemistry from University of Leeds, UK. His research dissertation was entitled Sulphur in Silk Fibroin from Bombyx Mori. He was later awarded Doctorate of Science from the same University in 1993.

From 1973 -76, he worked in Protein Chemistry in the Max Planck institute for Chemistry in Martinsried, near Munich, Rhineland-Palatinate, Germany, under G Braunitzer.

== Career ==
On return to Pakistan after completing PhD, Zaidi worked as a senior research officer at the Pakistan with Pakistan Council of Scientific & Industrial Research Karachi from 1969 to 1978. During this time, he was on the secondment to the Post Graduate Institute of Chemistry (now H.E.J. Research Institute of Chemistry) of the University of Karachi which he joined at the invitation of its head, Salimuzzaman Siddiqui At that time, this Institute was conducting research in Natural Products; Dr Zaidi introduced his area of expertise, Protein Chemistry, and established the first such research laboratory in Pakistan in 1976.

Zaidi made significant contributions in the field of Protein Chemistry research. He has penned 8 books, 114 research papers and 8 chapters in various books on the topic to his credit. He organized six international symposia and workshops on Protein structure function and was a coordinator of the DNA Sequence Course held in 1987.

The Karachi University Senate recognized his contribution to Protein Chemistry by re-naming the National Center for Proteomics (established 2008) to Dr. Zafar H. Zaidi Center for Proteomics in November, 2019; this was formally changed in July 2020.

Zaidi became the 13th Vice Chancellor of University of Karachi, Pakistan from 25 July 1997 to 7 January 2001.

== Selected publications ==
=== Books ===
- "Die Naturwissenschaften in Pakistan", Editors: Syed Laik Ali, Robert Huber & Zafar H. Zaidi. Publisher: Deutsch Pakistanisches Forum e.v. Bonn, Germany (1997)
- "Protein Structure Function Relationship", Editors: Zafar H. Zaidi, D. L. Smith. Publisher: PLENUM Publishing Company, New York, London, Washington, Boston (Oct. 1996) ISBN 9781461303596
- "HPLC: A Practical Approach", Editors: Syed Laik Ali, Robert Huber & Zafar H. Zaidi & Sabira Naqvi, TWEL Publishers, Karachi, Doncaster, Gaithersburg, (1994)
- Third International Symposium on Protein Structure Function Relationship, Symposium Editor: Zafar H. Zaidi, Pure and Applied Chemistry, Journal of IUPAC, Medicinal Chemistry Section, Blackwell Scientific Publications, 66, 1 – 115 (1994)
- "Proceedings of Second National Chemistry Conference", Editors: R Naqvi, Zafar H. Zaidi & A Rahman. Publisher: University of Karachi, Karachi (1991)
- "Protein Structure Function Relationship", Editors: Zafar H. Zaidi, A Abbasi, D L Smith. Publisher: TWEL Publishers, Karachi, London, New York (1990)
- "Protein Structure Function Relationship" Zafar H. Zaidi. Publisher: Elsevier Science Publishers, Amsterdam (1988)
- "Natural Sciences in Pakistan", Editors: W. Voelter, S L Ali & Zafar H. Zaidi. Publisher: German Pakistan Forum, West Germany (1986)
- "Electrophoresis a monograph", Editors: Zafar H. Zaidi & Iffat N. Nadvi Publisher: TWEL Publishers, Karachi, Doncaster, Gaithersburg

=== Articles ===
- Low resolution Molecular Structures of Isolated Functional Units from Arthropodan and Molluscan Hemocyanin.by Jun Gunter Grossmann, S. Abid Ali, Atiya Abbasi, Zafar H. Zaidi, Stanka Stova, Wolfgang Voelter & S. Samar Hasnain. Journal of Biophysics Vol. 78: 977 – 981 (2000)
- Sea Snake (Hydrophis Cyanocinctus) Venom II: Histopathological changes induced by a toxic phospholipase A2. (PLA 2 – H1). J.M. Alam, S.A. Ali, Zafar H. Zaidi, A. Abbasi, S. Stova, W. Voelter, Toxicon Vol. 38(5), 687 – 705. (2000)
- Molecular Confirmations of Single Functional Subunits from Arthropodan & Molluscan hemocyanins studied by solution X – Ray Scattering. J.G. Grossmann, S. A. Ali, A Abbasi, Zafar H. Zaidi, S. Stoeva, W. Voelter, S.S. Hasnain, Journal of Molecular Biology, Journal of Biophysics Vol. 78: 977-981 (2000)
- Pharmacological studies on leaf nosed viper (Eristocophis Macmahoni) venom and their HPLC fractions. S.A. Ali, F. Hamid, A Abbasi, Zafar H. Zaidi & Shahnaz, D. Toxicon Vol. 37: 1095–1107 (1999)
- Sea Snake (Hydrophis Cyanocinctus) Venom I: Purification, Characterization and N – Terminal sequence of two phospholipases A2: S.A. Ali, J M Alam, S. Stoeva, J. Shutz, A. Abbasi, Zafar H. Zaidi, W. Voelta. Toxicon Vol. 37(11): 1505 – 2115 (1999)
- Isolation & characterization of a Toxic Phospholipase A2 from Sea Snake (Hydrophis Cyanocinctus) venom. S A Ali, J M Alam, Zafar H. Zaidi & A Abbasi Pakistan Journal of Zoology Vol. 34(4): 289 – 294 (1998)
- Comparative Modelling of Structures and Active Sites of Cathepsin B from humans, chickens & hookworm: M K Azim, J G Grossmann and Zafar H Zaidi, Research Commun. Biochemistry Molecular & Cellular Biology Vol.2: (1,2), 113 – 128 (1998)
- Purification & Primary Structure of Low Molecular Mass Peptides from Scorpion (Buthus Sindicus) Venom. S A Ali, S. Stoeva, J. Shultz, R. Kayed, A. Abbasi, Zafar H. Zaidi & W. Voelter. Biochemical Physiology 121 (4): 323 – 332, (1998)
- Alloxan – Induced cataract and leakage of lens crystallins in the serum of rats. A I Saifee & Zafar H Zaidi. Proc. Pak Academy Science 34 (2): 107 – 109 (1997)
- Isolation, characterization and structure of sibtilisim from a thermostable Bacillus Subtilis isolate. M Kamal, Jan Olov – Hoog, R. Kaiser, J. Shafqat, I. Razzaki, Zafar H. Zaidi & H. Jornvall. FEBS lett. 374: 363 – 366 (1995)
- The complete sequence of human lens γs Crystallins. J B Smith, Z Yang, P. Lin, Zafar H. Zaidi, A. Abbasi, P. Russel. Biochemistry Journal 307: 407-410 (1995)
- Oxygen Transport Proteins: II. Structure, Organization & Subunit heterogeneity in scorpion hemocyanins. S A Ali, Zafar H. Zaidi and A. Abbasi, Pakistan Biochemistry Journal, Molecular Biology 28: 95 – 103 (1995)
- Oxygen Transport Proteins Structure and organization of Haemocyanin from Scorpion (Buthus Sindicus), S.A. Ali, Zafar H. Zaidi, A. Abbasi, Journal of Comparative Biochemistry & Physiology. Vol. 112(A): 225 – 232 (1995)
- Primary Structure of Haemoglobin from Cobra (Naja, Naja, Naja), S. Naqvi, A. Abbasi & Zafar H. Zaidi. Journal of Protein Chemistry Vol. 13. No. 8. 669 – 679 (1994)
- Three – Dimensional model and Quaternary Structure of the Human Eye Lens Protein S – Crystallin based on β – and γ – crystallin X – ray coordinates and Ultracentrifugation. S. Zarina, C. Slingsby, R. Jaenicke, Zafar H. Zaidi, H. Driessen & N. Srinivasan. Protein Science Vol 3: 1840–1846 (1994)
- Cataractous Lens and its Environment. S. Zarina, A. Abbasi and Zafar H. Zaidi. Pure & Applied Chemistry.Vol.1: 111 – 115 (1994).
- Oxygen Transport Proteins: Structure and Organization of Haemocyanin from Scorpion (Androctonus Australis and Buthus Sindicus), S.A., Zafar H. Zaidi, A. Abbasi, Proc. 2nd International Biochemistry Cong. University of Tehran, Iran. Scientific Journal p. 52 (1993).
- Structural and Functional Divergence of Proteins from Leaf – Nosed Viper (Eristocophis Macmahoni) Venom. A.R. Siddiqui, J. Shafqat, Zafar H. Zaidi and H. Jornvall. Journal of Protein Sequence and Data Analysis Vol.. 11: 410 – 412 (1993)
- Characterization of two Platelet Aggregation Inhibitor – Like Proteins, Eristocophins I & II from Leaf – Nosed Viper (Eristicophis Macmahonii) Venom. A.R. Siddiqui, B. Persson, Zafar H. Zaidi and H. Jornvall. Peptide Vol. 13(6): 1033–1037 (1992)
- Structural Characterization of Rabbit Brain Ubiquitin. N. Wajih, A.R. Siddiqui, R. Kaiser, B. Persson, Zafar H. Zaidi and H. Jornvall. Protein Sequence and Data Analysis. Vol. 15(1): 31 – 32 (1992)

=== Chapters ===
- Scorpion [Bathus Sindicus] haemocyanin: Primary structure elucidation and the anomalous behaviour of the subunit Bsin 1 to Edman degradation analysis: Ali, S.A., Zaidi, Z.H., and Abbasi, A. (1999) in Trends in Chemical & Biochemical Sciences in Pakistan.
- Isolation & Purification of Haemocyanins from Scorpions [Bathus Sindicus] Ali, S.A., Zaidi, Z.H., and Abbasi, A.: 2nd National Biochemistry Symposium (Dhahot U.M. ed.) p. 123 – 126, University Press, Hyderabad (1995)
- Primary Structure of Avian Haemoglobin: Zafar H. Zaidi, A. Abbasi, C. Sultana and A Islam – "Protein Structure Function" p. 265 – 276. Publisher: TWEL Publishers – Karachi, London, New York (1990)
- Avian Haemoglobin – Structure, function & physiology: Zafar H. Zaidi, C Sultana – Natural Product Chemistry, p. 835 – 867 Ed: Atta Ur Rahman, Publisher: Elsevier (1989)
- Higher Education in Science in Pakistan: its past, its present and its future trends. Zafar H. Zaidi in Natural Sciences in Pakistan: p. 295 – 300. Publisher: Deutsch Pakistan forum e.v. West Germany (1986)
- Haemoglobinopathies in Pakistan: Zafar H. Zaidi, A. Ahmed & S. Naqvi. New Trends in Natural Products Chemistry: p. 651 – 660. Edited: Atta ur Rahman, Phillip W. Le Quesne. Published: Elsevier Science Publishers, Amsterdam (1986)
- Primary structure of hemoglobin from reptile Uromastix hardwickii and its status in molecular evolution. S. Naqvi, H Jornvall, Zafar H. Zaidi. Natural Products Chemistry p. 536 – 551. Edited by Atta ur Rahman, Springer – Verlag, New York (1985)

== Awards and honours ==
- Sitara-e-Imtiaz, 1995 (Star of Excellence) by the Government of Pakistan
- Khwarizmi International Award, 1992 (Contribution to Science) by the Government of Iran
- Tamgha-e-Imtiaz, 1989 (Medal of Excellence) by the Government of Pakistan

== Legacy ==
- Zafar H Zaidi Memorial Trust
- The New Examination Hall at University of Karachi
- ‘Grooming the Leadership Skills’ by Zafar H. Zaidi
- National Center for Proteomics renamed to Dr. Zafar H. Zaidi Center for Proteomics Ex - VC
- Establishment of the National Institute of Electronics Lahore
- Establishment of the first Institute of Computer Science in Karachi with a Graduate Programme with funds from BCCI Foundation for the Advancement of Science & Technology (BCCI FAST)
