= Ananda Dairy =

Indian dairy company

Ananda Dairy Ltd.
- Trade name: Ananda
- Formerly: Gopaljee Dairy (1989-2012)
- Company type: Public
- Industry: Dairy/FMCG
- Founded: November 15, 1989; 36 years ago in Siana, Uttar Pradesh
- Founder: Radhey Shyam Dixit
- Headquarters: Noida, Uttar Pradesh, India
- Products: Milk, Ghee, Butter, Paneer, Chhach etc.
- Revenue: 1700 Crore (2024)
- Website: www.ananda.in

Ananda Dairy is an Indian dairy company headquartered in Uttar Pradesh, India. Founded in 1989, it produces and supplies milk and a range of dairy products in northern and central India. The company operates five processing plants and a network of retail outlets, and distributes its products in the National Capital Region and neighbouring states.

== History ==
Ananda Dairy was established on 15 November 1989 in Siyana, Bulandshahr district, Uttar Pradesh. It was founded by Dr. Radhey Shyam Dixit and initially distributed its products through third-party transport services. The company began operations under the name Gopaljee Dairy. In March 2012, it changed the name Gopaljee Ananda, and was later rebranded as Ananda.

In February 2018, the company opened 105 new outlets in Delhi and the National Capital Region, investing approximately ₹5 crore, which brought the total number of company-owned outlets to around 400. The company later expanded its processing capacity by leasing additional dairy plants in Kanpur and Moradabad. In early 2018, Ananda began exporting select dairy products, including paneer, ghee, and sweets, to international markets such as the United States.

The company later established the Ananda Foundation as part of its corporate social responsibility initiatives, supporting programmes related to dairy farming and livestock health in parts of Uttar Pradesh.

In November 2023, the company entered into a memorandum of understanding (MoU) with the Brazilian firms Ameria Pujol and Beig Exports to explore potential cooperation in animal feed production and cattle breed improvement.

In December 2025, Ananda was announced as a co-presenting sponsor for a season of MasterChef India, which premiered on Sony Entertainment Television in January 2026.

== Operations ==
Ananda procures milk through village-level collection centres in northern India. The milk is tested at collection points, transported to chilling facilities, and processed at company plants. The company operates five manufacturing plants in Pilkhuwa, Siyana, Gajraula, Varanasi, and Raebareli in Uttar Pradesh. Its products are distributed through distributors and retail outlets, including neighbourhood grocery stores, and are sold across multiple Indian states, including the National Capital Region.

== Products ==
Ananda manufactures milk and dairy products such as liquid milk, curd (dahi), paneer, ghee, butter, rabdi, flavoured milk, UHT milk, and traditional Indian dairy-based sweets. The company also produces certain packaged food items, including some non-dairy products. Ananda’s product portfolio includes items such as A2 milk and selected packaged foods outside its core dairy range.

== Awards and recognition ==
In 2024, the company set a Guinness World Record for producing a 205.4 kilogram slab of paneer.
