= Bulandshahr =

- City
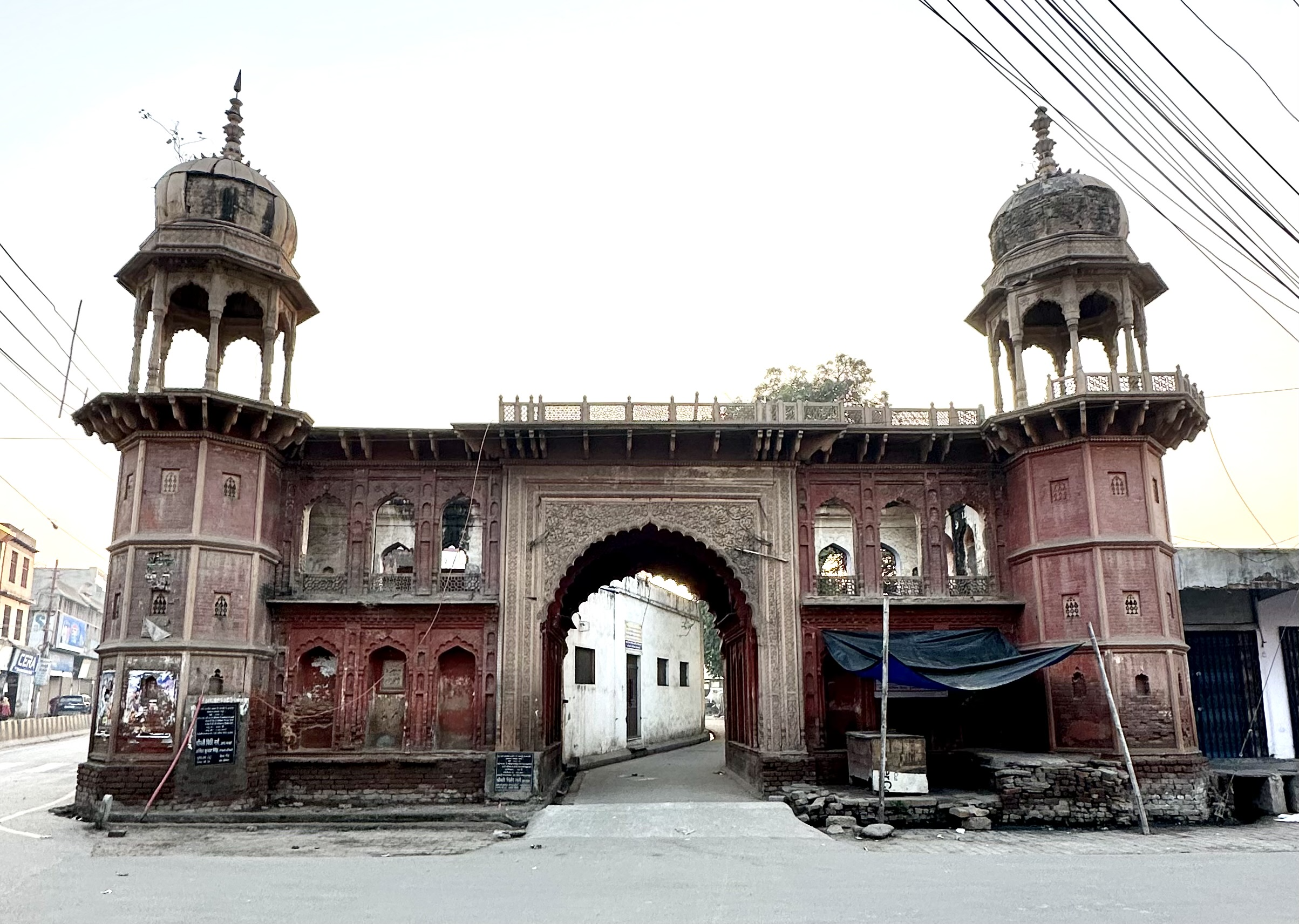
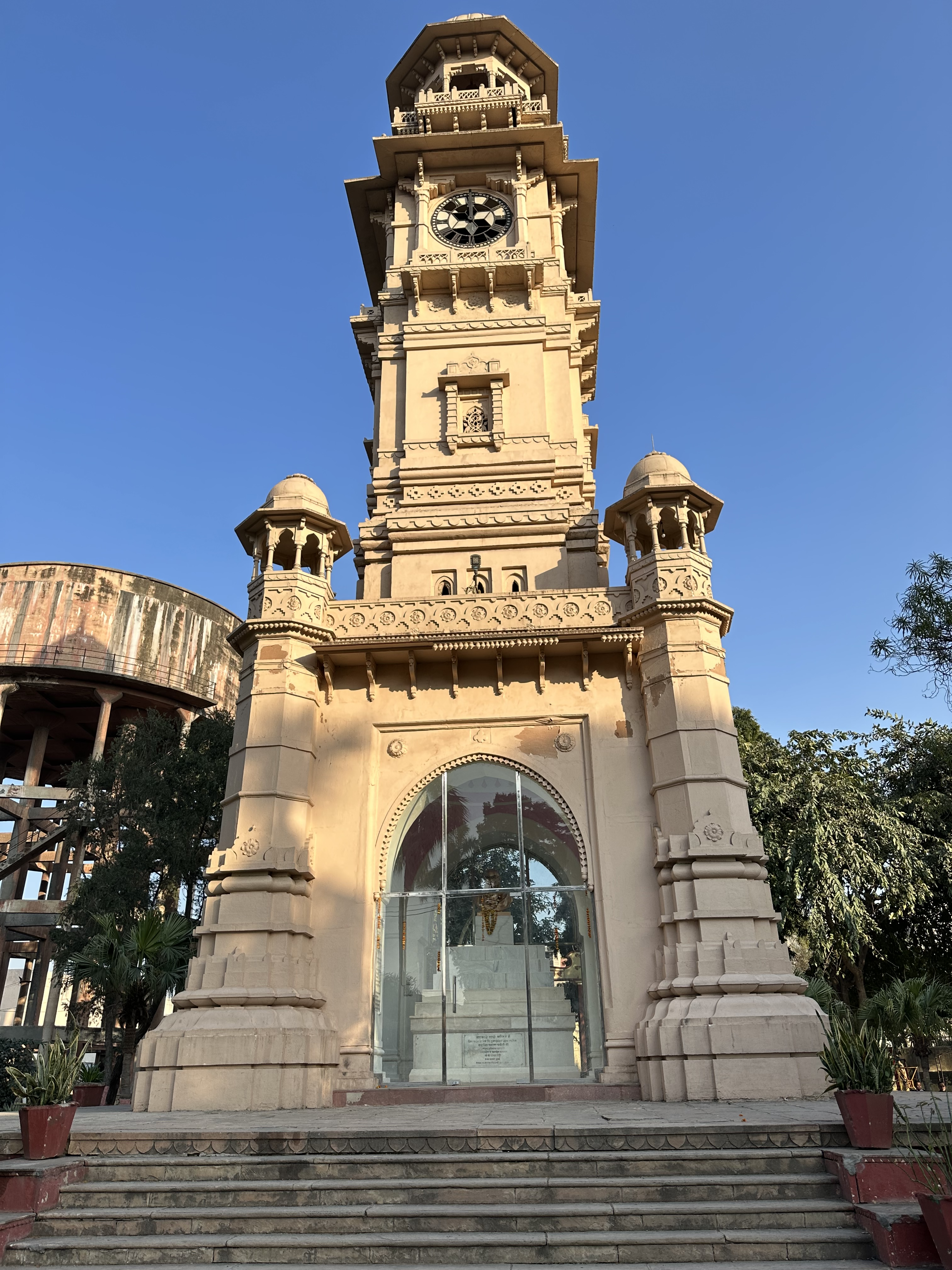
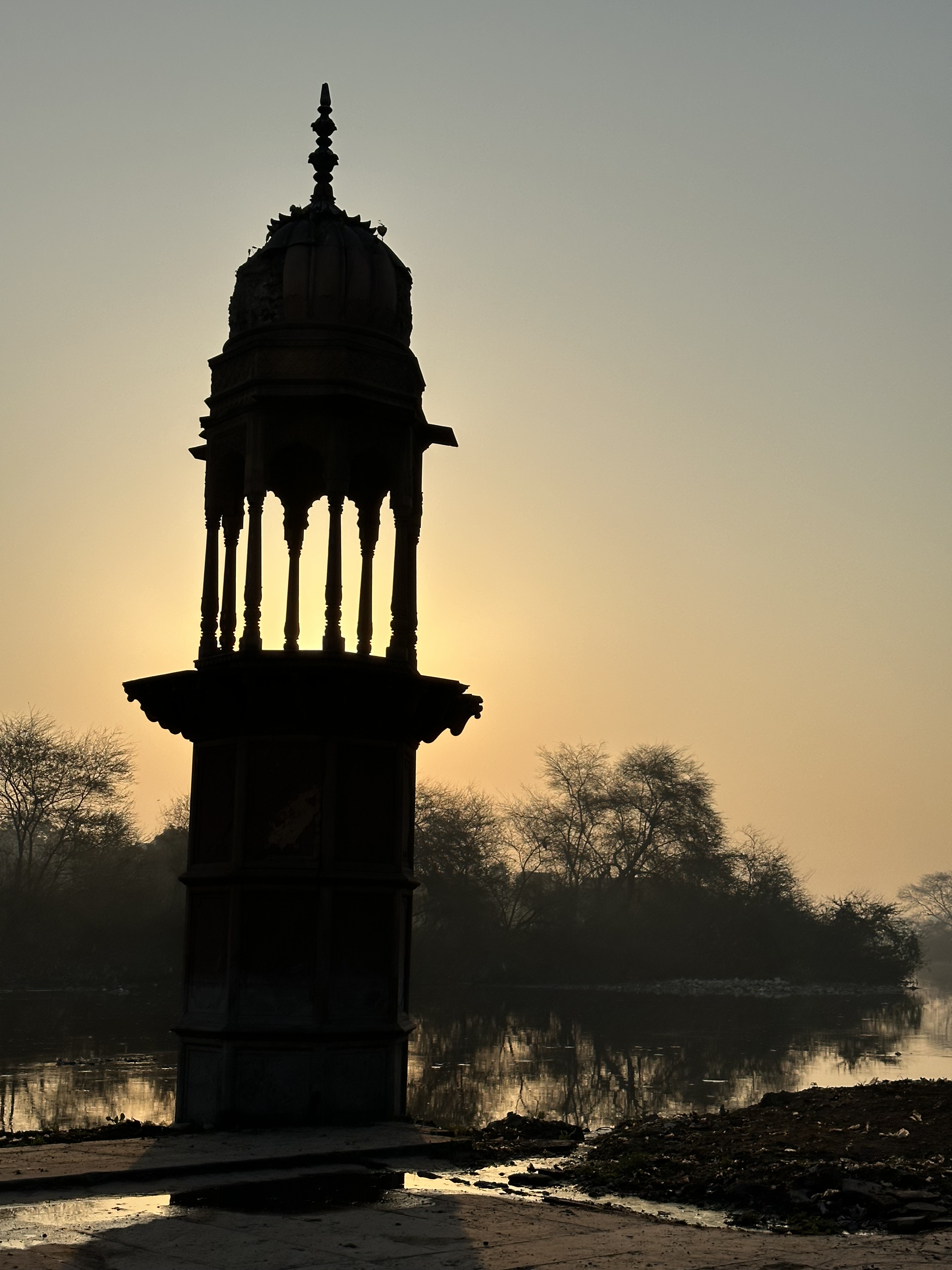
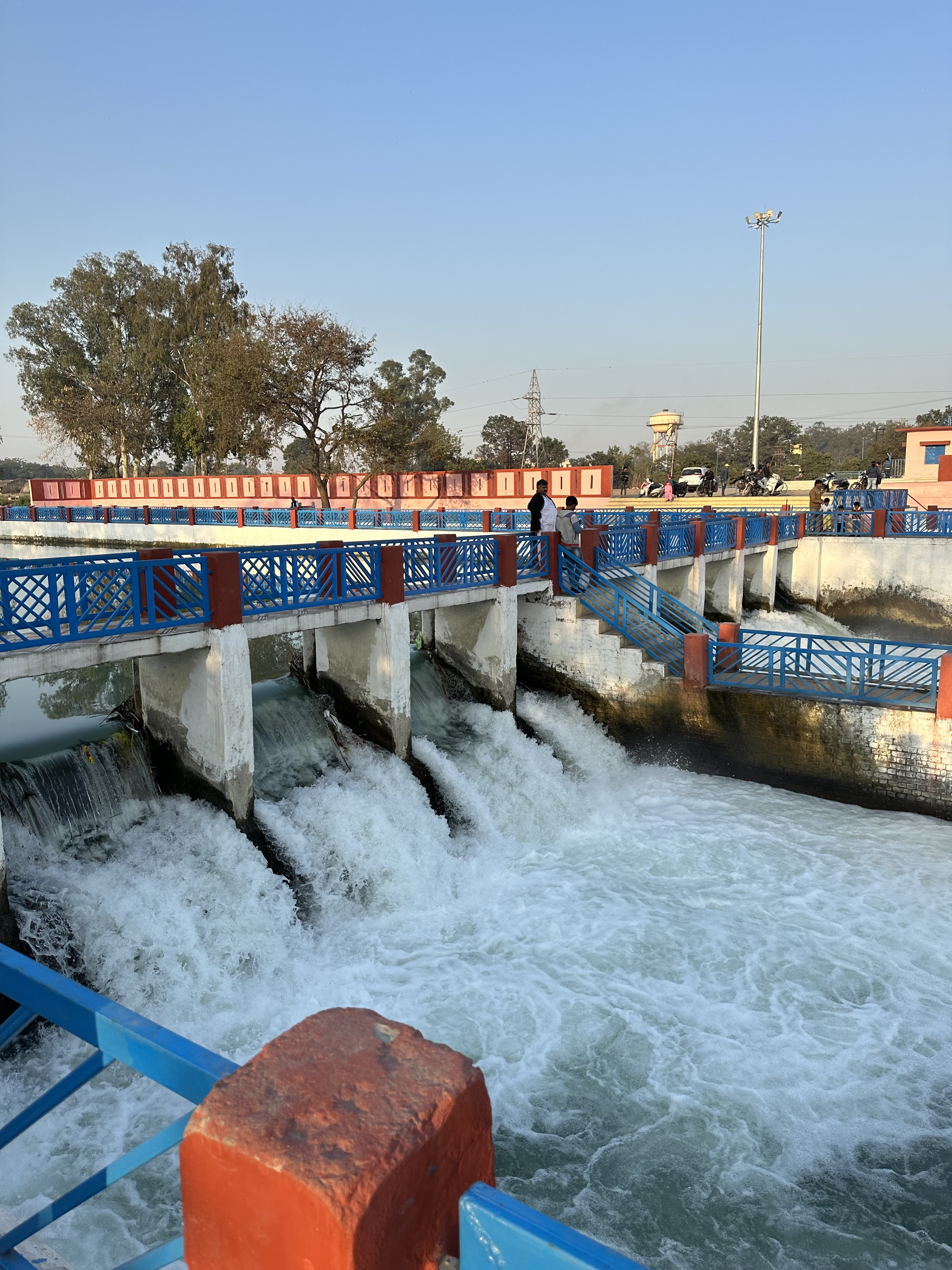
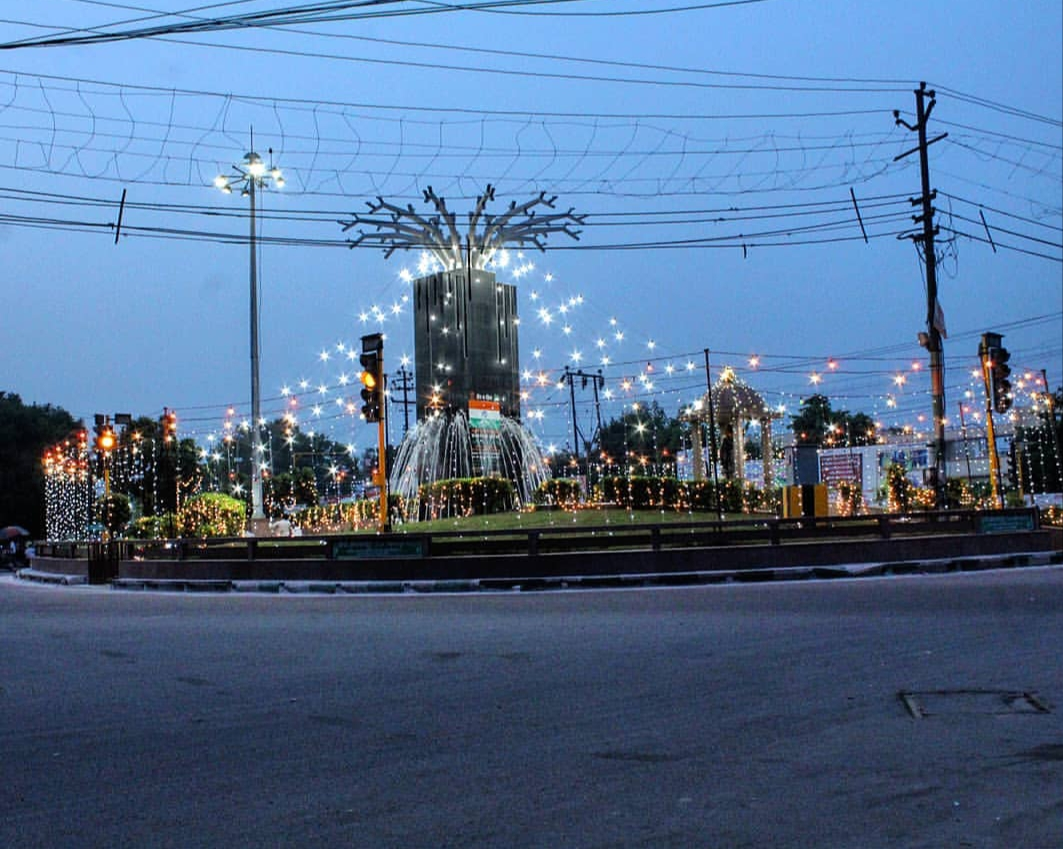
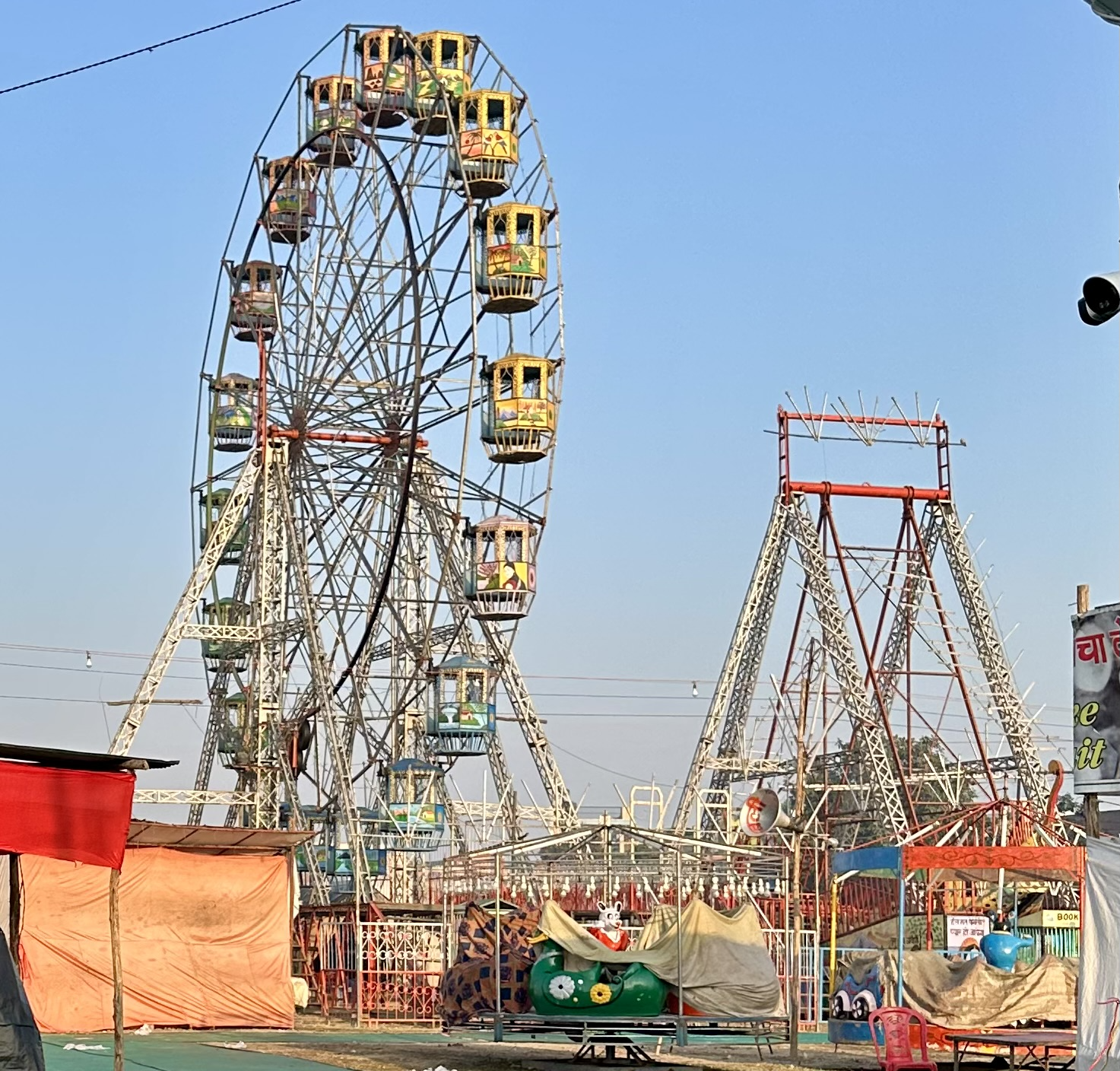
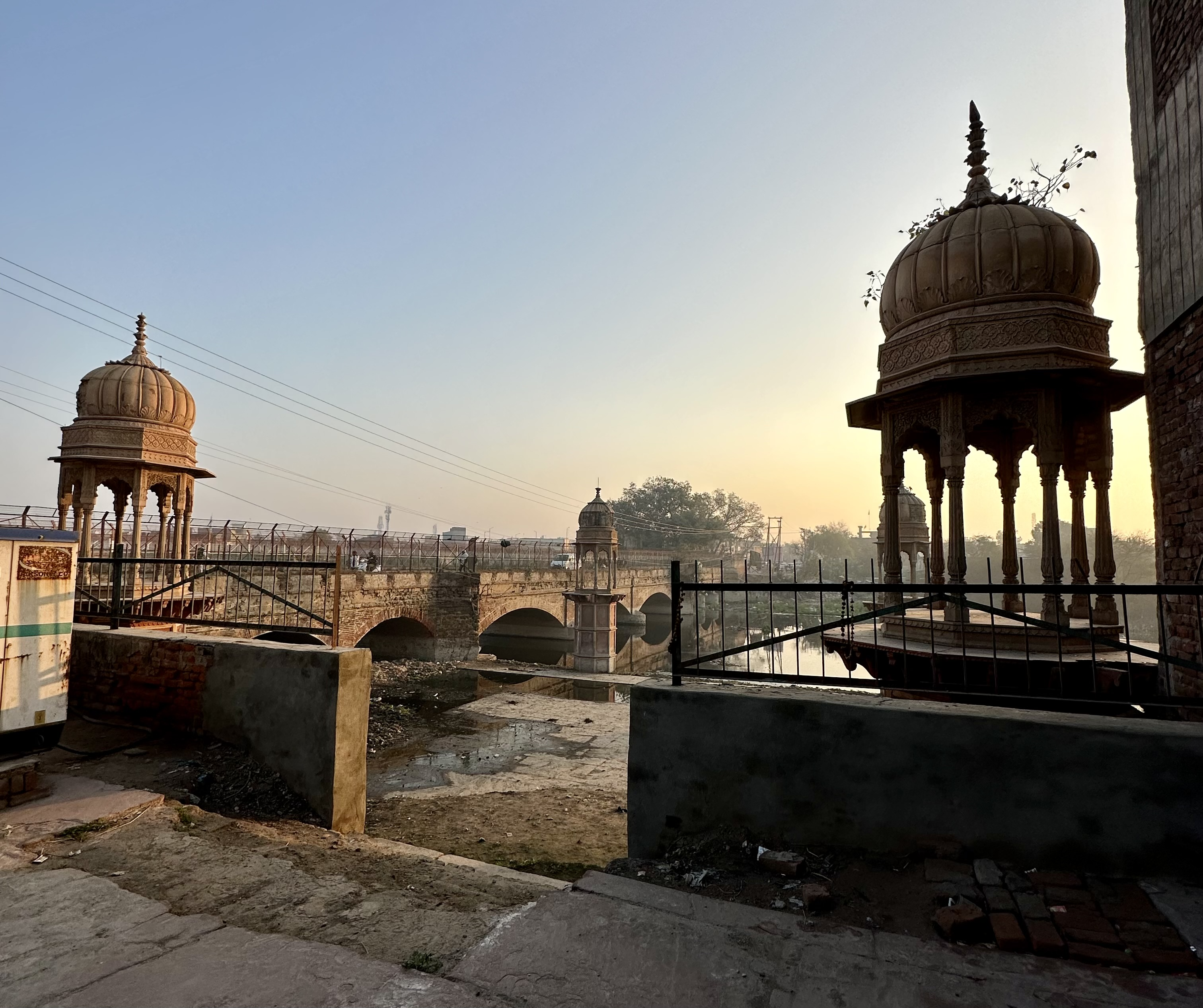
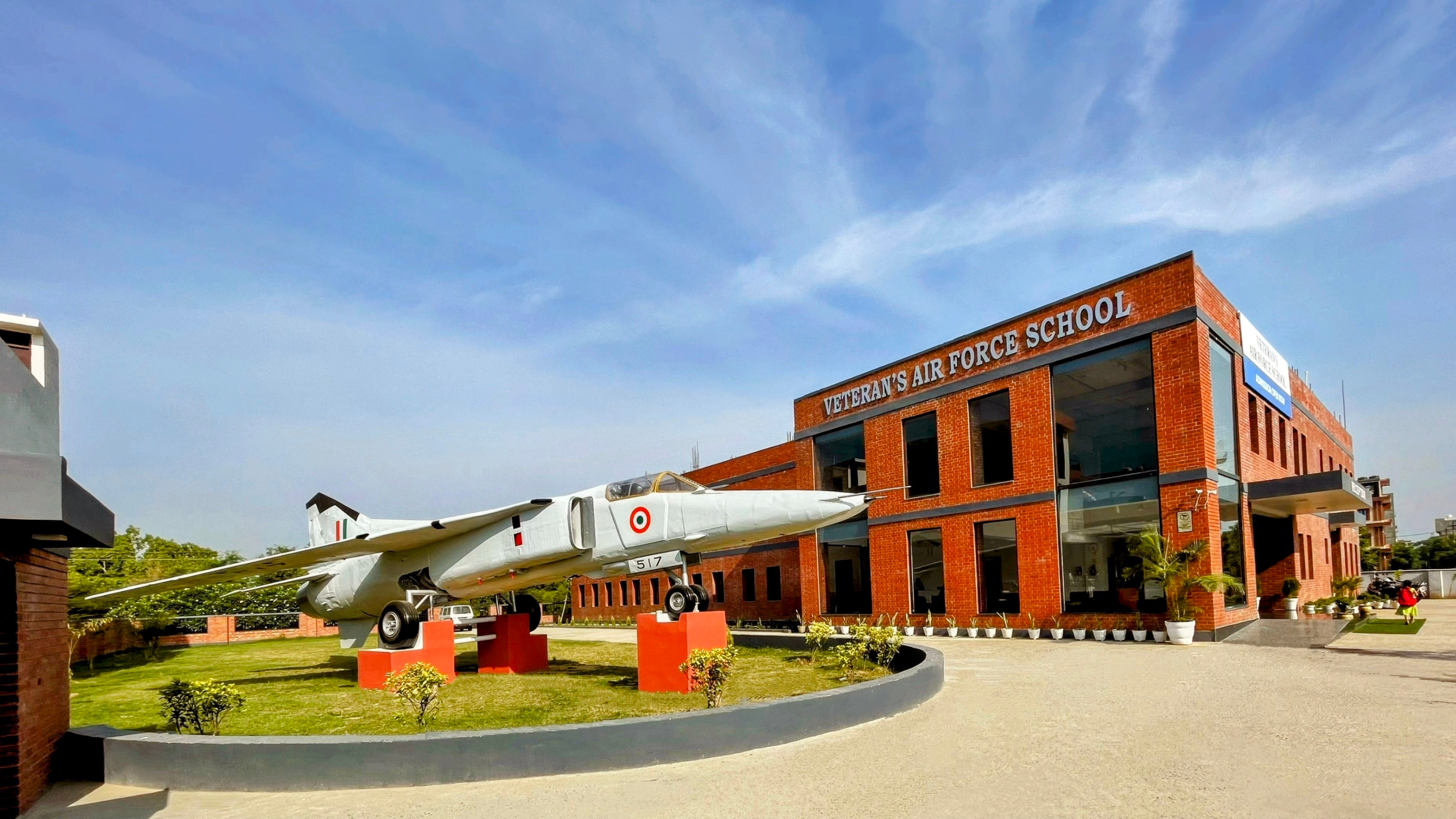
- Left to right, top to bottom: Garden Gate, Mahatma Gandhi bust (Malika park), Bathing Ghat, Nahar (Canal), Kala Aam, Exhibition grounds, Kali Nadi bridge and MiG-27 fighter aircraft at Veteran's Air Force School in Ganganagar

- Location in Uttar Pradesh, India Bulandshahr (India)
- Coordinates: 28°24′25″N 77°50′59″E
- Country: India
- State: Uttar Pradesh
- District: Bulandshahr
- Founder: King Ahibaran

Area
  - Total: 72 km^{2} (28 sq mi)
- Elevation: 195 m (640 ft)

Population (2011)
  - Total: 235,310
  - Density: 788/km^{2} (2,040/sq mi)

Language
  - Official: Hindi
  - Additional official: Urdu
  - Native: Khari boli
- Time zone: UTC+5:30 (IST)
- PIN: 203001
- Telephone code: 91 (5732)
- Vehicle registration: UP-13
- Sex ratio: 1.892 ♂/♀
- Website: bulandshahar.nic.in

Bulandshahr, formerly Baran, is a city and a municipal board in Bulandshahr district in the state of Uttar Pradesh, India.

It is the administrative headquarters of Bulandshahr district and part of Delhi NCR region. According to the Government of India, district Bulandshahr is one of the Minority Concentrated Districts of India on the basis of the 2011 census data on population, socio-economic indicators and basic amenities indicators.

== Etymology ==
An early history of Bulandshahr and the origin of its name is given by British District magistrate and collector for the Indian Civil Service, Frederic Salmon Growse, in a paper titled "Bulandshahr Antiquities" published in the Journal of the Asiatic Society of Bengal in 1879. Bulandshahr was founded as 'Baran' by the king Ahibaran.

Since it was perched on a highland it came to be known as "high city", (Persian: بلند شهر), which translates as Bulandshahr in Persian language during the Mughal era.

== History ==
=== Early history ===
The history of Bulandshahr begins even before 1200 B.C. This region is nearer to the capital of Pandavas – Indraprasth and Hastinapur. After the decline of Hastinapur, Ahar which is situated in the north east of district Bulandshahr became an important place for Pandavas. With the passage of time, the king Parmal's descendant Maharaja Ahibaran made a fort on this part of region and laid the foundation of a tower called Baran(Bulandshahr). Since it was perched on a highland it came to be known as high city which was translated into Persian language as Bulandshahr. At present this is called by this name. All evidences point it to being Varnavat as described in Mahabharat.

The ancient ruins found at places Bhatora Veerpur, Ghalibpur etc. are symbolic of antiquity of Bulandshahr. There are several other important places in the District from where statues of medieval age and objects of ancient temples had been founded. Even today several historical and ancients objects such as coins, inscriptions etc. are preserved in Lucknow State Museum .

The kingdom of Baran came to an end probably during the 12th century. It was being ruled by Dod Rajputs who were tributaries of the royal family of Baran, Baranwals and ruled under the royal family's name, the family was considered a direct descendant of Pandavas. In 1192 CE when Muhammad Ghauri conquered parts of India, his general Qutubuddin Aibak conquered Fort Baran; Raja Chandrasen Baran died fighting but not before killing Khwaja, the commander of the Aibak army, in whose memory a maqbara was built.

The ancient ruins found at places in Bhatora Veerpur, Ghalibpur, etc. are indicative of the antiquity of Bulandshahr. There are several other important places in the District from where statues belonging to the medieval age and objects of ancient temples have been found. Even today, several of these historical and ancient objects such as coins, inscriptions etc. are preserved in the State Museum Lucknow.

=== British rule ===
Raja Lachhman Singh (1826–1896), who served the government from 1847 and wrote a Statistical Memoir of the Bulandshahr District, moved to Bulandshahr following retirement.

The first collector of Bulandshahr was Robert Lowther.

==== Indian Rebellion of 1857 ====
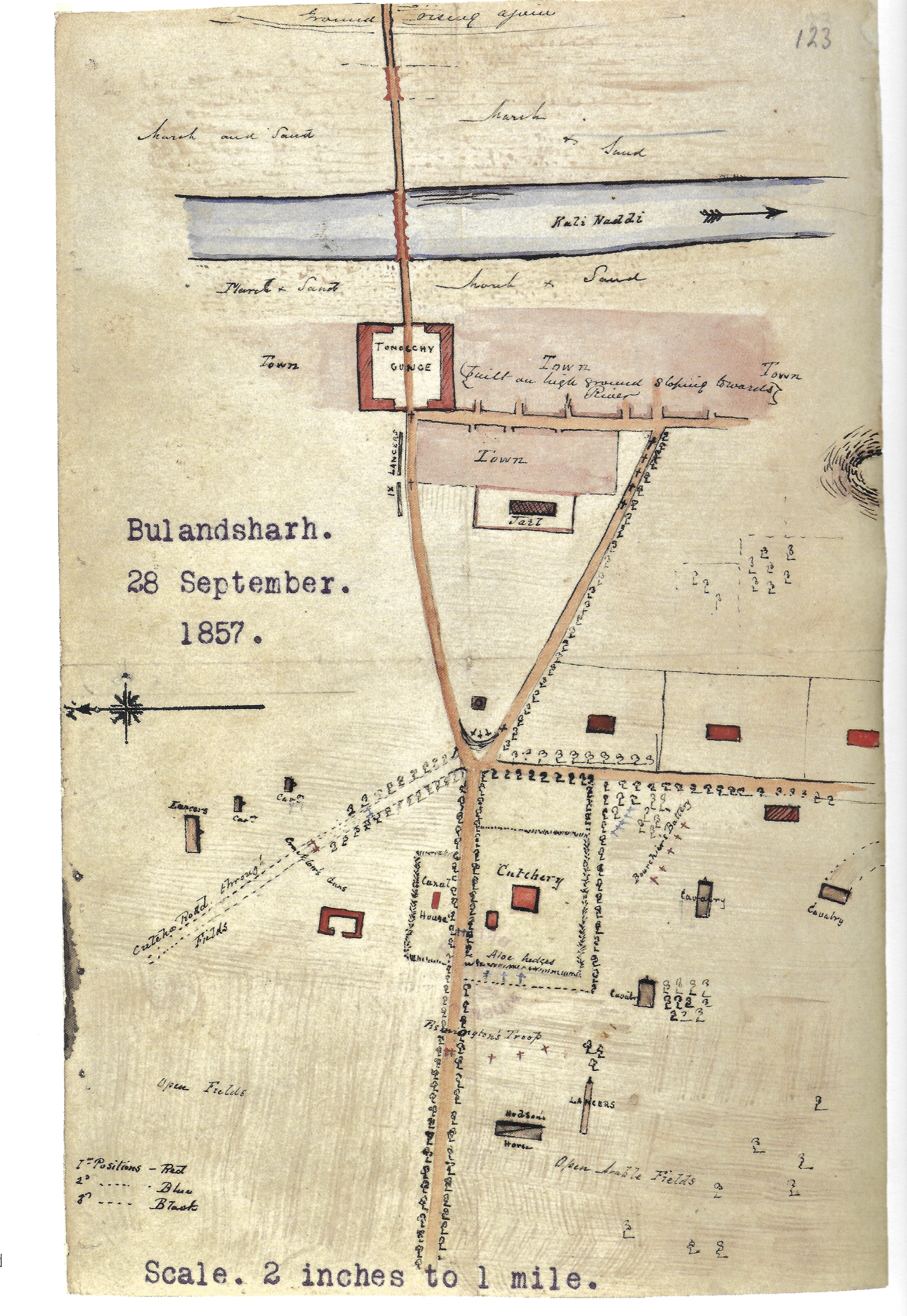
Bulandshahr map 1857

A large number of Gurjar and Rajput rulers, called zamindars, rebelled and attacked Bulandshahr itself on 21 May 1857. The Gurjars plundered multiple towns such as Sikandrabad. They burnt down Telegraph lines and Dak Bungalows. The rebelling Nawab, Walidad Khan also belonged from Bulandshahr. The presence of Nawab Walidad Khan in Bulandshahr had completely paralysed the British about this time.

Walidad Khan recruited a large number of Indian Muslims who had been serving in the Irregular Cavalry, such as Skinner's Horse.

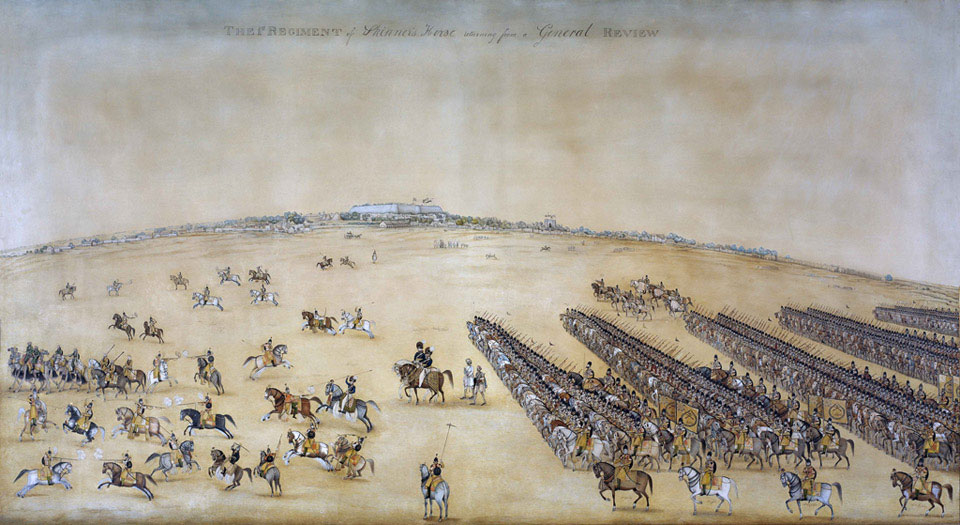
Regiment of Skinner's Horse returning from a General Review

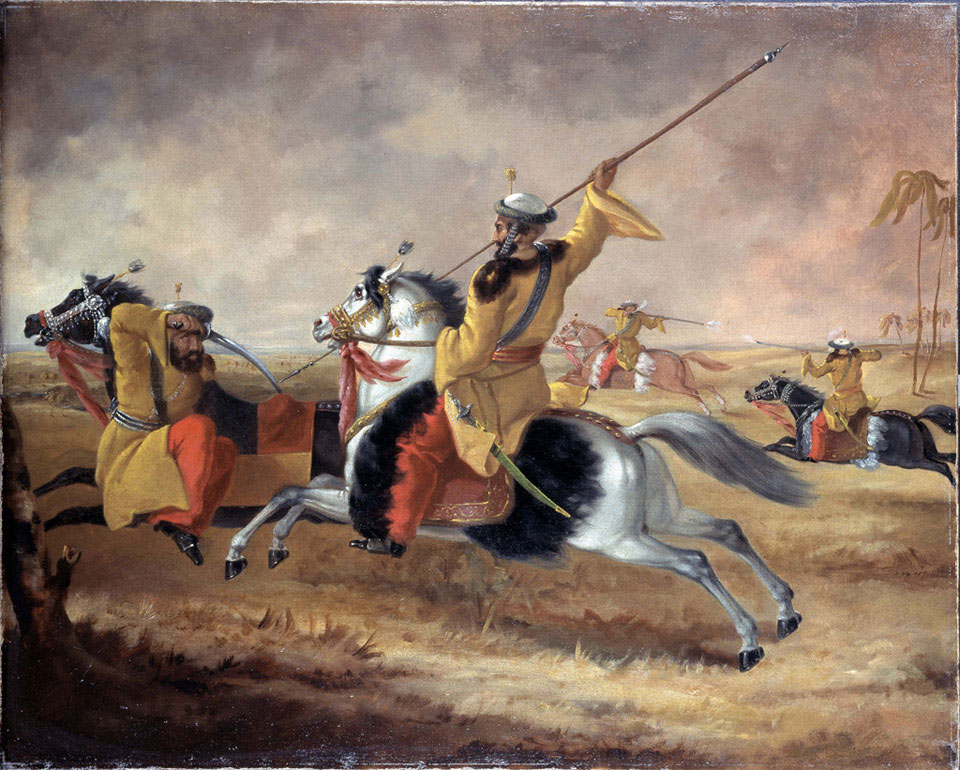
Skinner's Horse at Exercise, 1840

The Indian Rebellion of 1857 is generally associated with the surrounding areas, such as Meerut, Delhi and Aligarh. On 20 May 1857, the 9th regiment of Bulandshahr looted the treasury at Bulandshahr. Sir Alfred Comyn Lyall was subsequently appointed assistant magistrate of Bulandshahr, and Lord Roberts was also present in the district.

=== Park ===
Raja Babu Park had been constructed in Bulandshahr in 1837, and a statue of Queen Victoria was placed there in 1901, when the park was renamed ‘Maharani Victoria Park’.

=== Development under Frederick Growse ===
Growse, district magistrate and collector of Bulandshahr from 1876 to 1884, resided at Collector's House. In 1884 he published Bulandshahr; or, Sketches of an Indian district; social, historical and architectural.

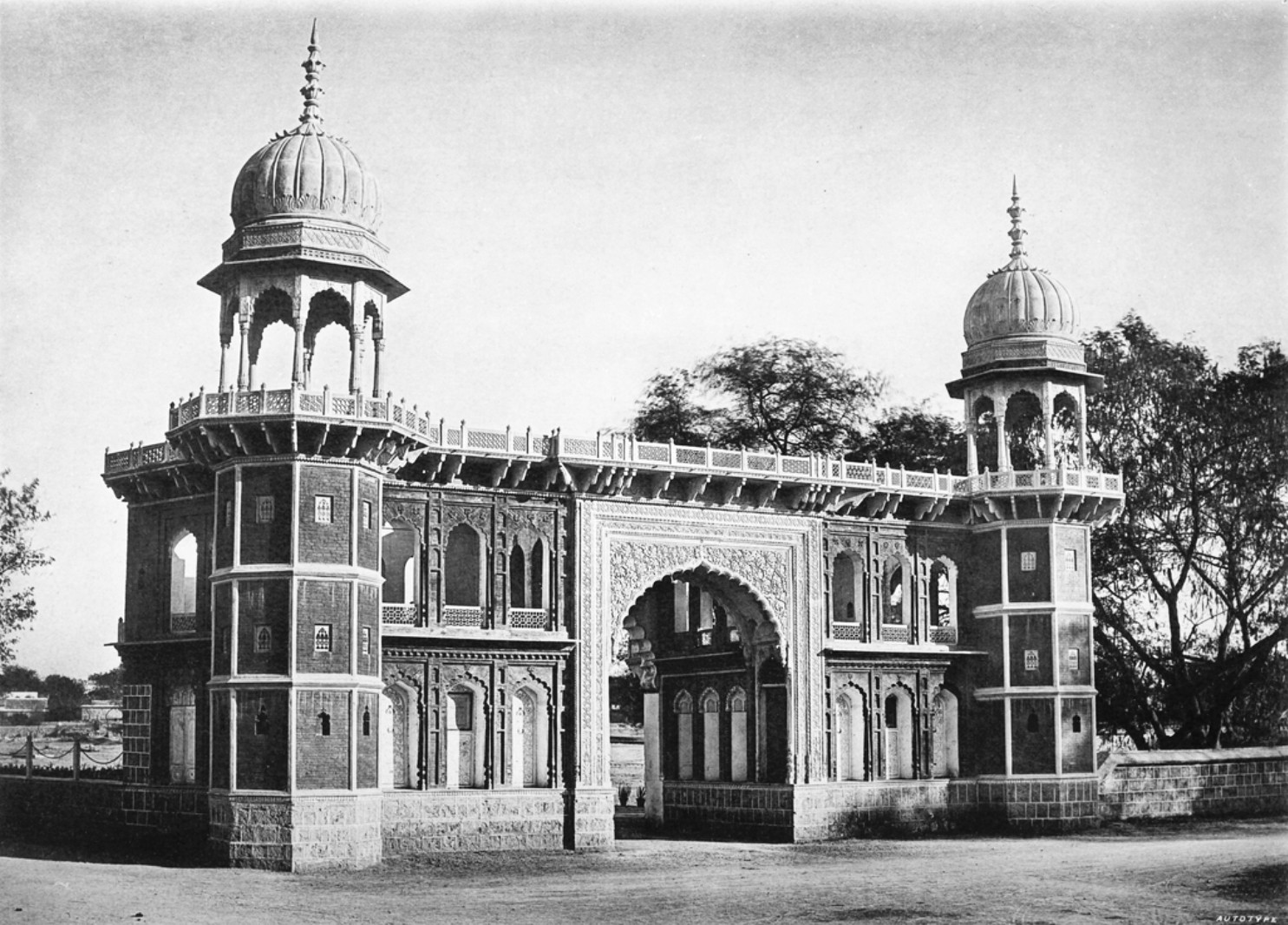
Garden Gate: entrance to Town Hall and Moti Bagh (1880s)

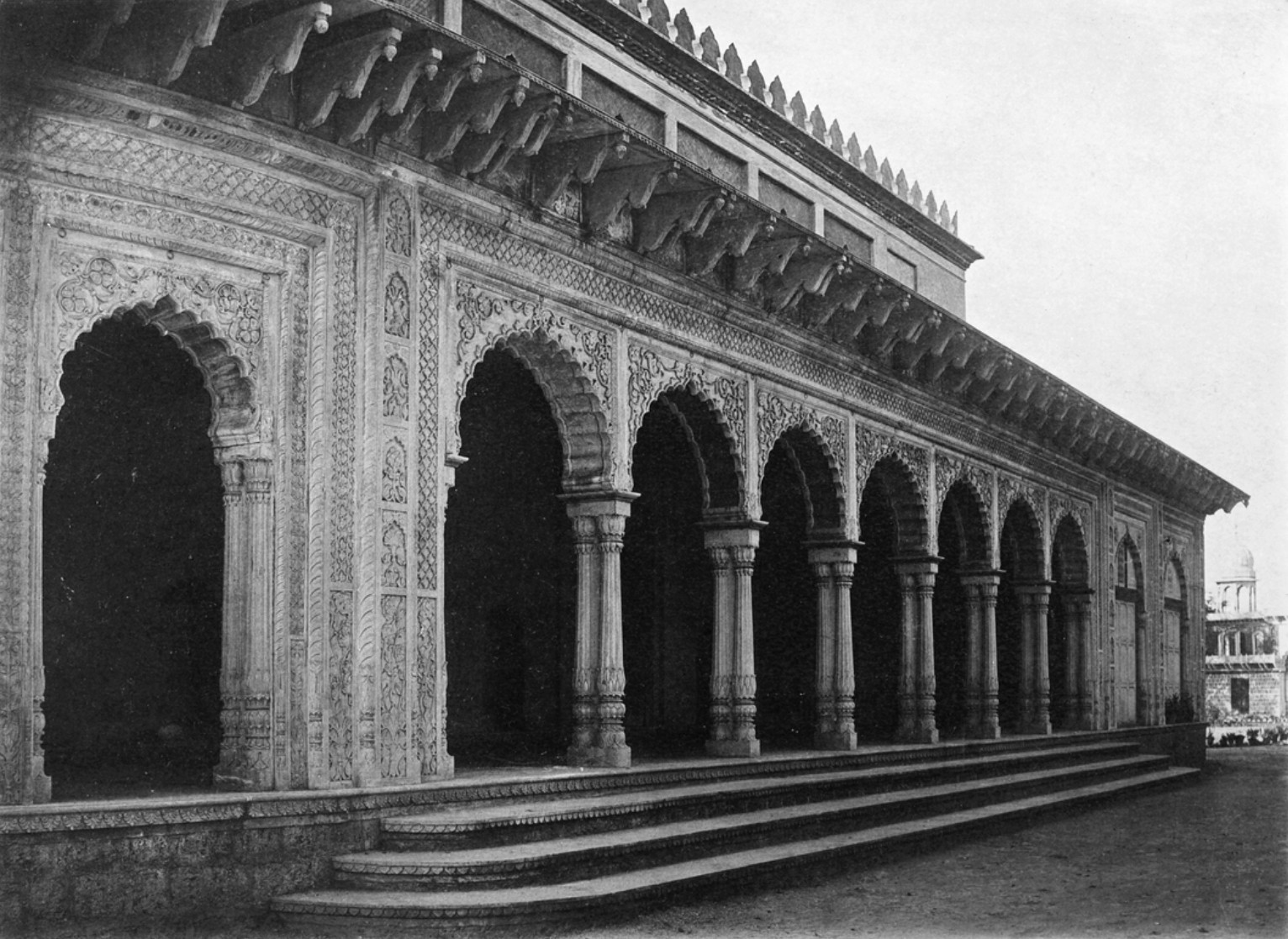
Town Hall. North Verandah (Chunni Lál)

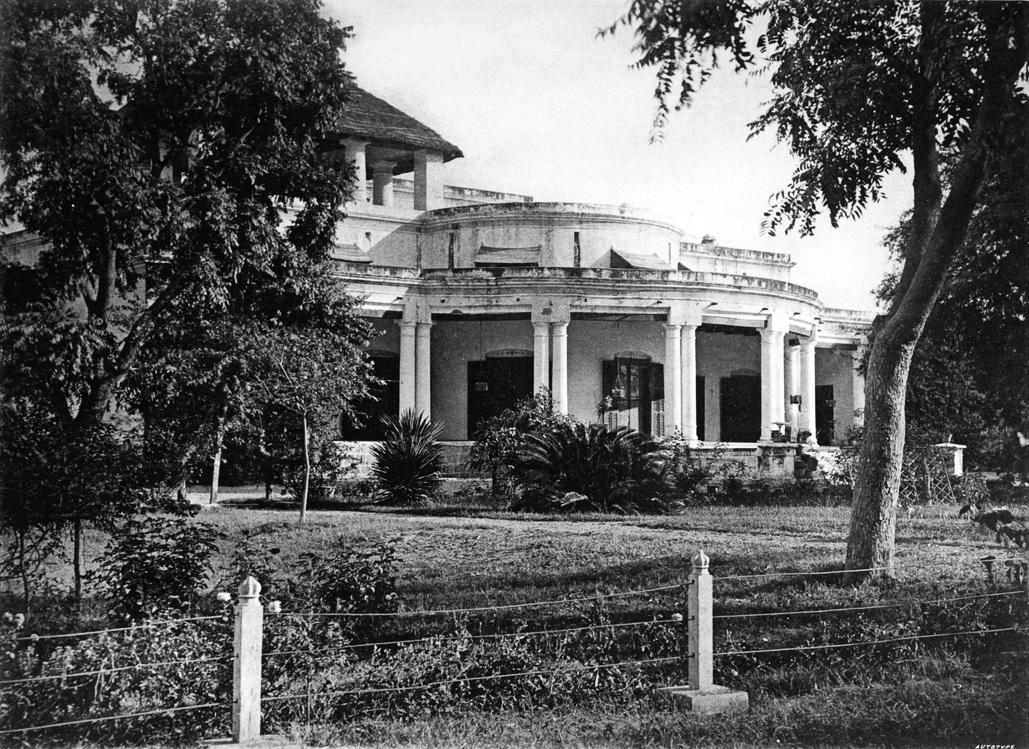
Old Collector's House (1886)

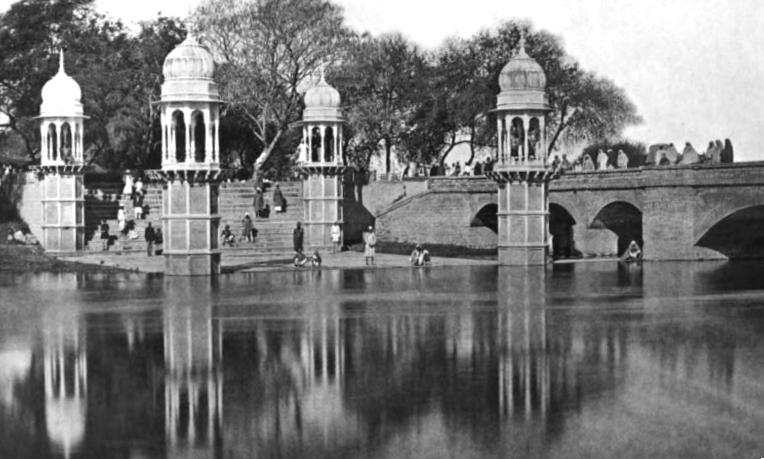
Bathing ghat at Kali Nadi

== Post-independence ==
Following India's independence, ‘Maharani Victoria Park’ was renamed after Rajeshwar Dayal Saxena, president of the Civil Bar Association and later president of Municipal Board, Bulandshahar. Later it was renamed again back to 'Raja Babu Park'. In 1969 a bust of Mahatma Gandhi was established in the park.

== Geography ==
The distance between Bulandshahr and New Delhi is 68 km. It lies in the Bulandshahr district on the Agra to Delhi Road, and is surrounded by Delhi, Meerut, Moradabad, Badaun and Aligarh.

== Demographics ==
Religions in Bulandshahr (2011)
Religion	Percent
Hinduism	63.63%
Islam	35.53%
Other or not stated	0.84%

As per provisional data of 2011 census, Bulandshahr urban agglomeration had a population of 235,310, out of which males were 125,549 and females were 111,761. Population in the age groups of 0 to 6 years was 30,886. The total number of literates were 160,203, of which 90,761 were males and 69,442 were females. The effective literacy rate of 7+ population was 78.37%.

Languages in Bulandshahr (2011)
1. Hindi (85.0%)
2. Urdu (14.5%)
3. Others (0.43%)

== Administration and politics ==
Bulandshahr is one of seven administrative sub-divisions of the District of Bulandshahr.

== Buildings ==
Bulandshahr has four gates; Bunford Club Gate, Fatehganj Gate, Growseganj Gate and Moti Bagh Gate.

== Events ==
The town hosts an annual exhibition known as 'numaish'.

== Attractions ==
=== Clock Tower ===
The Clock Tower at Malka Park is a historical landmark from the Victorian era located at the centre of Bulandshahr district in Raja Babu Park or Malka Park which was constructed during the British period in 1837. In 1901, a statue of Queen Victoria was placed in this park and the park was named as 'Maharani Victoria Park'. After the independence of the country, it was renamed as 'Raja Babu Park'. In 1969, a statue of Mahatma Gandhi was established inside the tower.

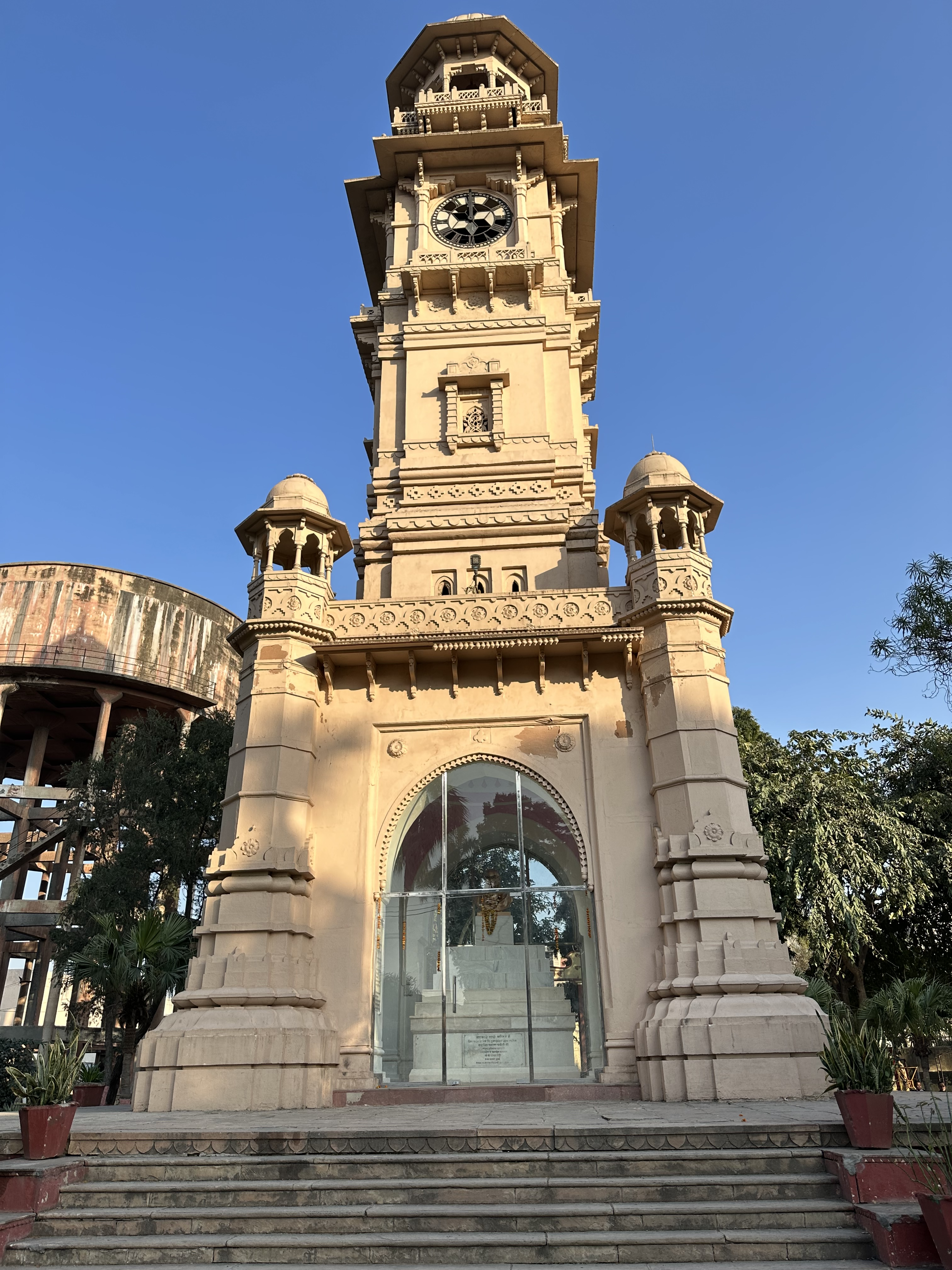
Clock tower at Malka park

=== Kuchesar Fort ===
Kuchesar Fort (alternatively known as 'Rao Raj Vilas Kuchesar Fort') is located at Kuchesar, in Bulandshahr, Uttar Pradesh, India, approximately 84.3 kilometres (52.4 miles) east of Delhi.

The fort served as the erstwhile seat of the Jat Kingdom of Uttar Pradesh.

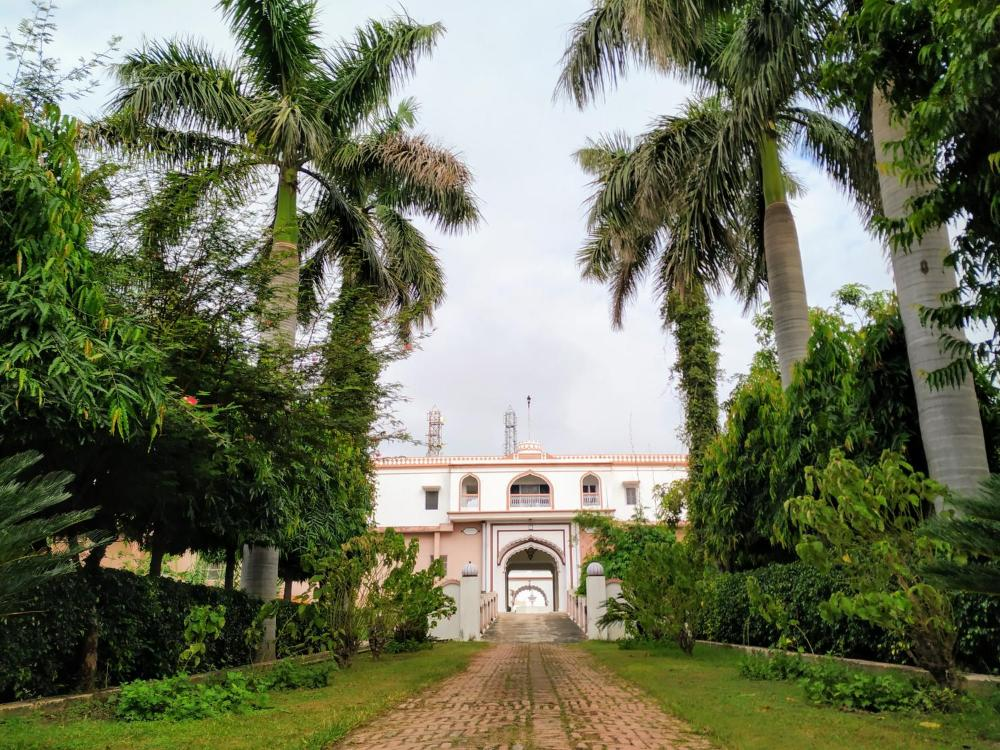
Mud Fort at Kuchesar

=== MiG-27 Fighter Aircraft ===
Mikoyan MiG-27, a supersonic swing-wing fighter aircraft is placed on static display at Veteran's Air Force School in Ganganagar, Bulandshahr. This is the first MiG-27 to be preserved and publicly displayed in Uttar Pradesh.

The Kargil War veteran has also featured on 'Warbirds of India' by PVS Jagan Mohan, a military historian who authored The India-Pakistan Air War of 1965.

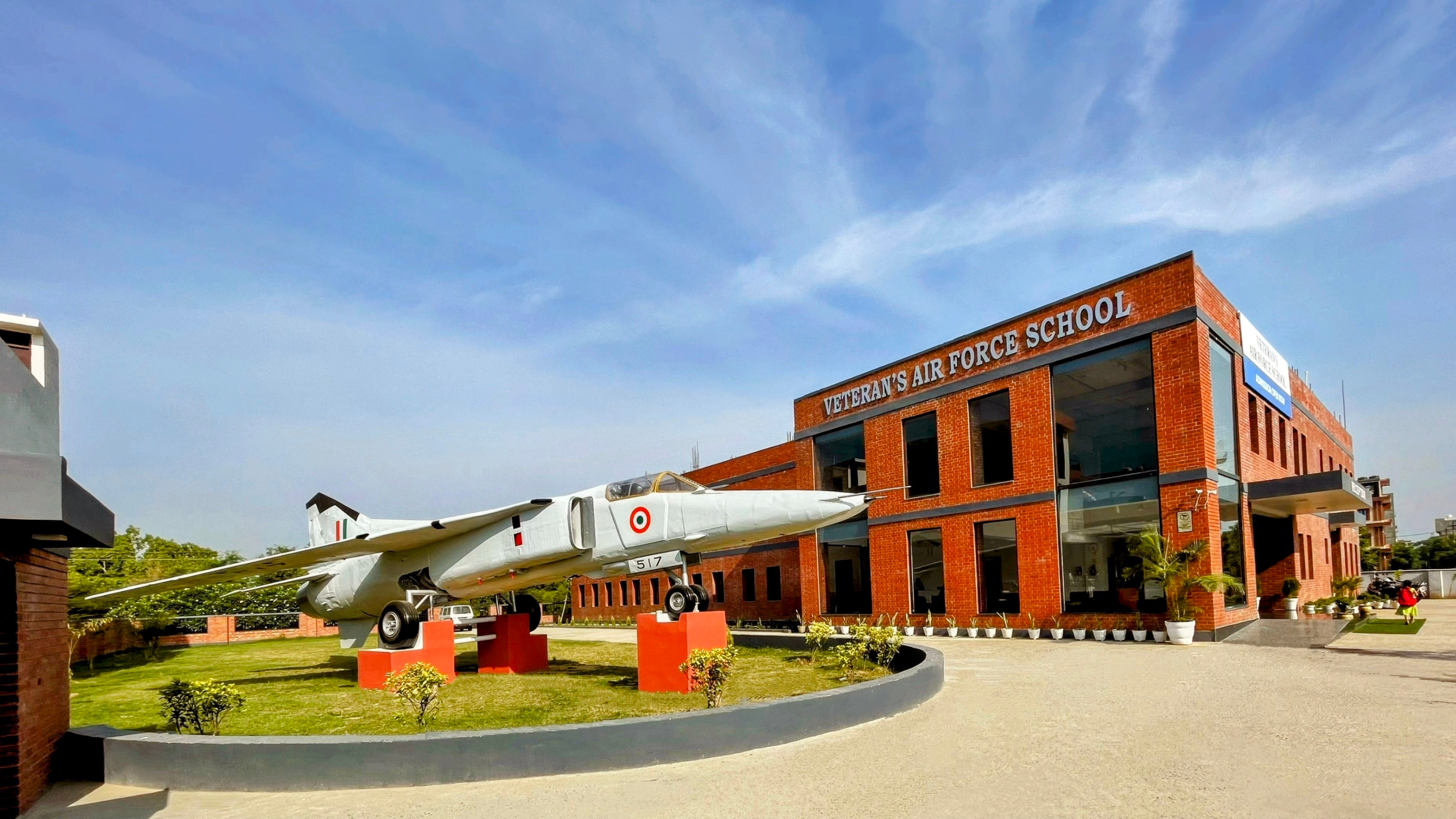
MiG-27 at Veteran's Air force School

== Notable people ==
- Capt. Abbas Ali
- Ahibaran, legendary founder of the city
- Ziauddin Barani, Indian historian
- Kay Baxter, dramatist, journalist and teacher
- Amit Bhadana, YouTuber and comedian
- Ashiq Ilahi Bulandshahri, Indian Islamic scholar
- Sonal Chauhan
- Banarasi Das
- Jaiprakash Gaur
- Saloni Gaur
- Masroor Hosain, Indian-Pakistani fighter pilot
- Arif Mohammad Khan
- Bhuvneshwar Kumar, fast bowler in the Indian cricket team.
- Satish Kumar
- Hitesh Kumari, former minister of UP irrigation department, and MLA from Debai assembly constituency.
- Gajendra Pal Singh Raghava, scientist expert in bioinformatics, winner of awards including Shanti Swarup Bhatnagar Prize for Science and Technology
- Arfa Khanum Sherwani, Indian journalist
- Kushal Pal Singh, CEO of DLF Limited, India's largest real estate developer.
- Neera Yadav, ex-officer of the Indian Administrative Service.
- Yogendra Singh Yadav, youngest ever Param Vir Chakra winner.
- Zafar H. Zaidi, scientist

== Gallery ==
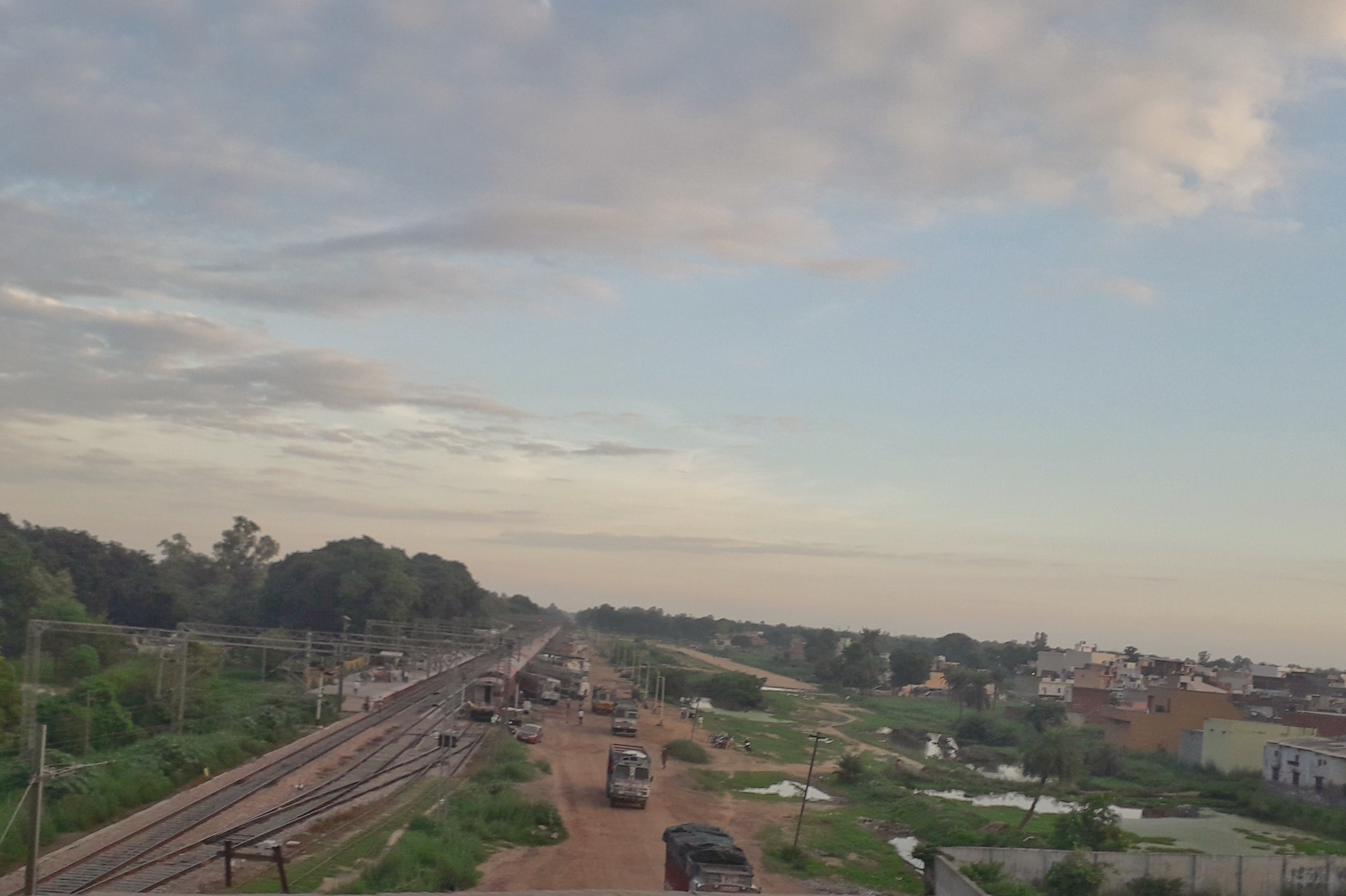
Bulandshahr Railway Station

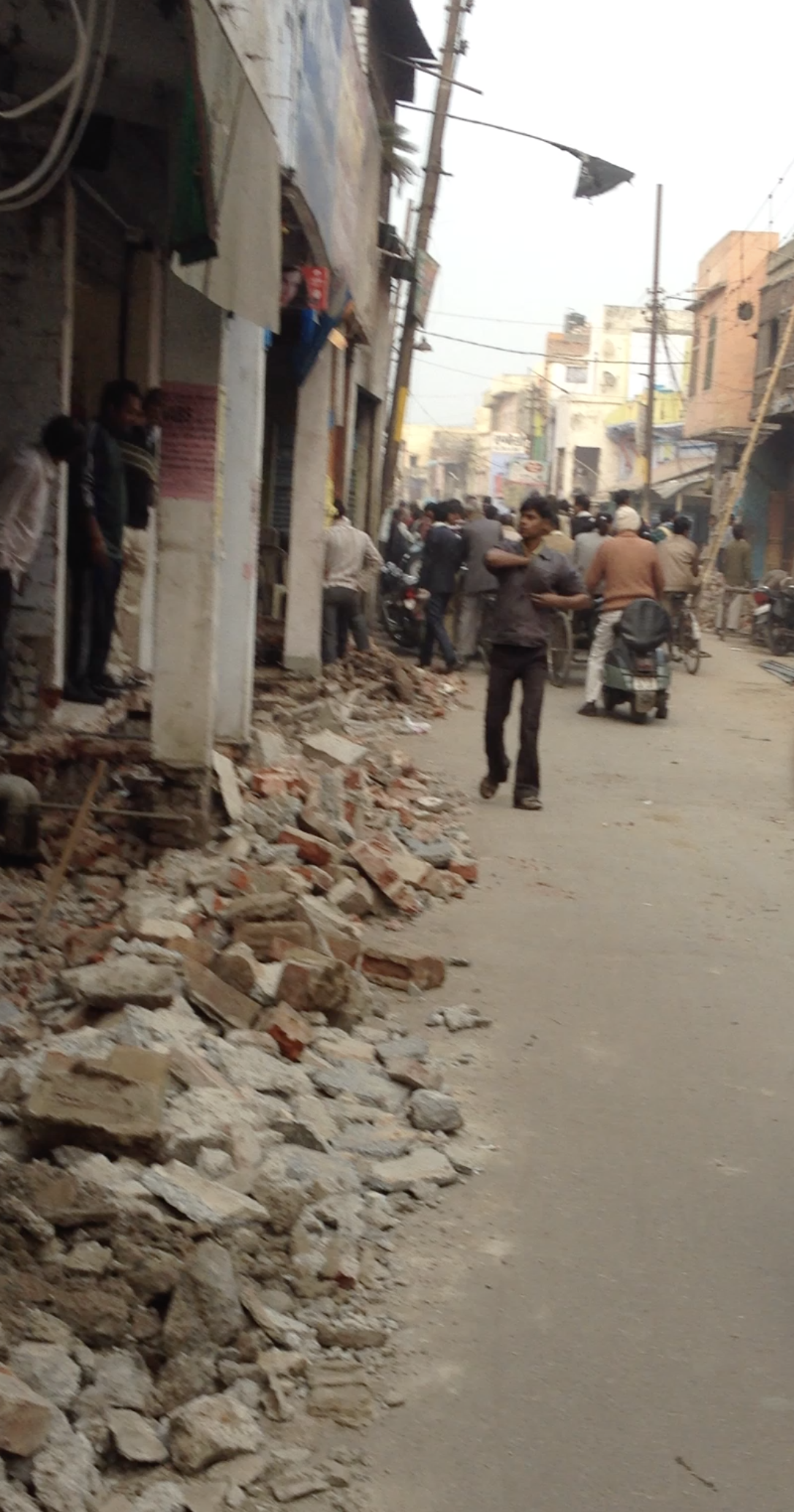
Bulandshahr street frontages 2012

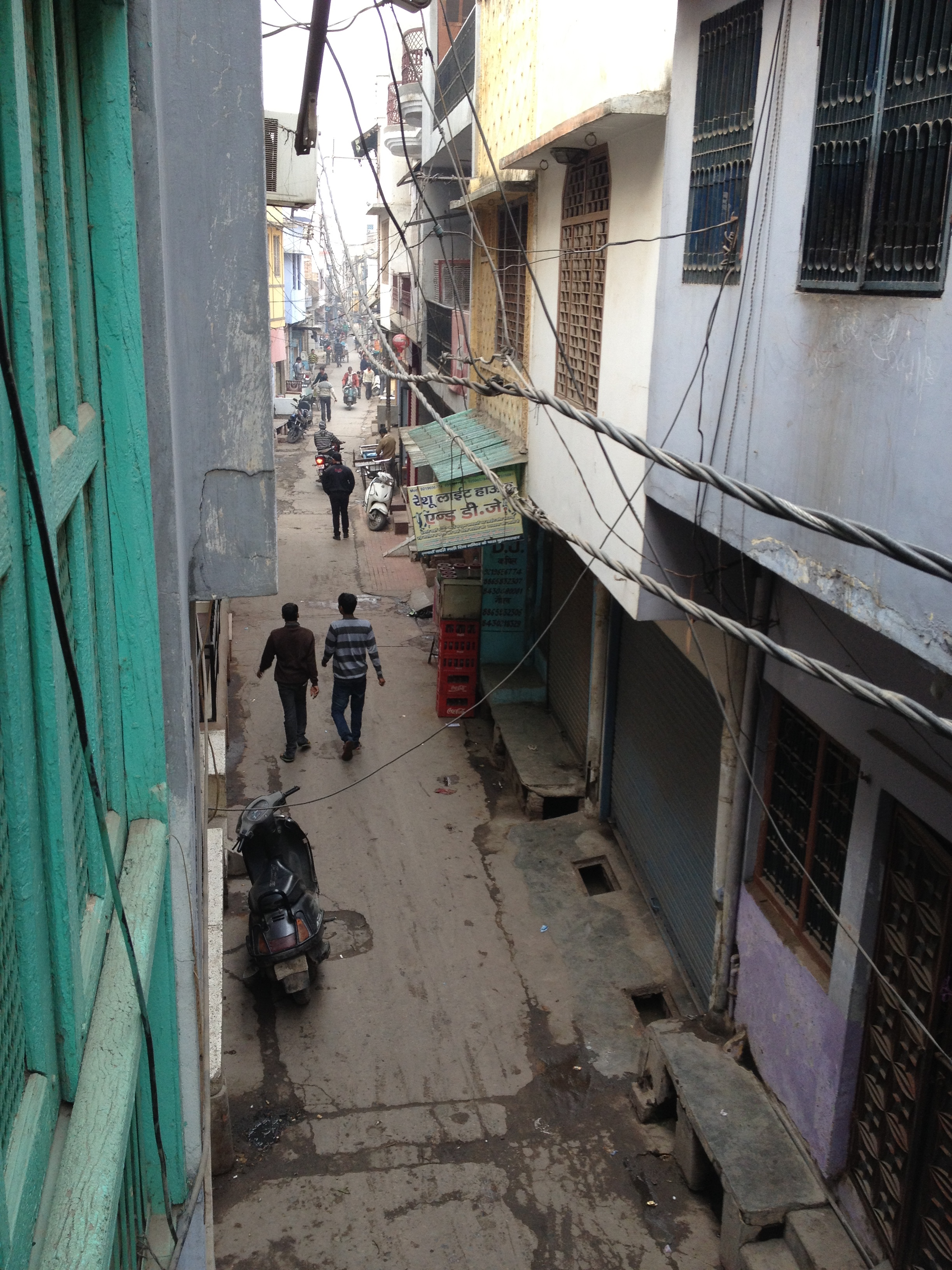
Sunaro wali galli

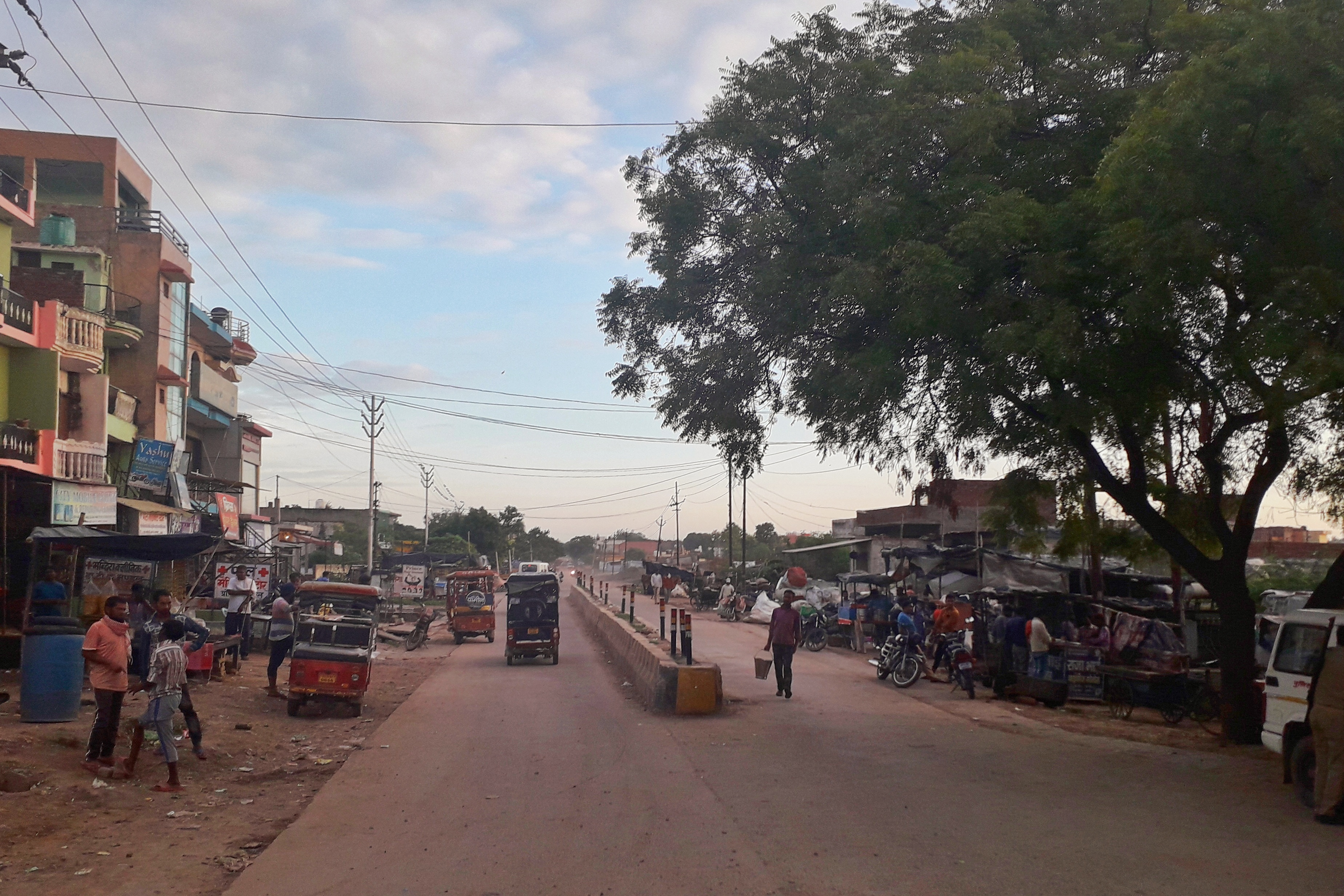
Maman road, Bulandshahr

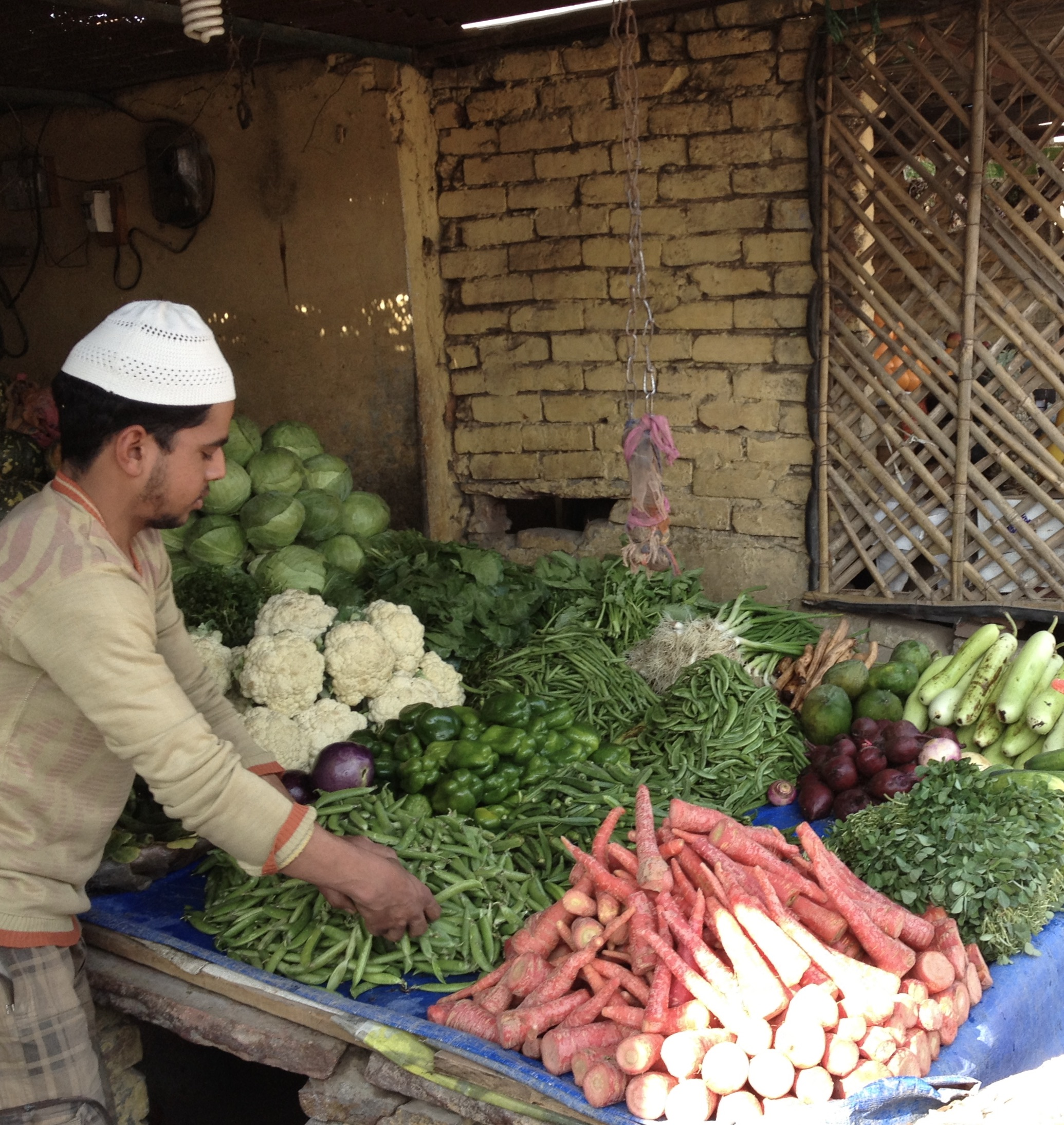
Bulandshahr vegetable market

== See also ==
- Baranwal
