= Gangnauli =

- Village
- Location within Uttar Pradesh Location within India
- Coordinates: 29°48′54″N 77°35′45″E
- Country: India
- State: Uttar Pradesh
- District: Saharanpur

Population (2011)https://censusindia.gov.in/nada/index.php/catalog/42648
  - Total: 3,352

Languages
  - Official: Hindi
- Time zone: UTC+5:30 (IST)
- PIN: 247551
- Vehicle registration: UP
- Website: up.gov.in

Gangnauli is a village in Saharanpur district in the Indian state of Uttar Pradesh. The village is known for being very poor, & also known as the "Village with One Sick Member Per House". The reason to this is drinking polluted water.

== Health Crisis in Gangnauli ==
Health Issues:

A significant portion of Gangnauli's population, especially the youth, suffer from severe health issues such as stunted growth, liver diseases, cancers, and bone deformities. More than 71 cancer-related deaths were reported between 2013 and 2018, according to the National Green Tribunal (NGT) .

== Water Pollution and Sources ==
Polluted Water Sources:

The Krishna River, along with other rivers like Kali and Hindon, has been heavily polluted by industrial waste. Industries such as sugar mills, slaughterhouses, paper mills, dye-making industries, and distilleries discharge untreated waste into these rivers, contaminating groundwater .

Carcinogenic Elements:

Water testing revealed high levels of heavy metals and chemicals, including arsenic, mercury, lead, zinc, phosphate, sulfide, cadmium, iron, nickel, and manganese, all linked to serious health issues .

== Government and Judicial Actions ==
NGT Recommendations:

The NGT recommended various measures including a door-to-door medical survey, provision of piped drinking water, establishment of specialized hospitals, and industrial waste management. Implementation of these recommendations has been slow and incomplete, with many industries continuing to pollute water sources .

Local and State Government Response:

Local health officials acknowledge the presence of carcinogens in the water but have not conducted comprehensive studies to confirm their link to cancer. Efforts to provide piped drinking water have reached more than 50% of the affected population, but many other recommendations remain unfulfilled .

== Social and Economic Impact ==
Economic Strain:

Many families have gone bankrupt due to high medical expenses, with some selling their land to cover costs. The health crisis has severely affected the socio-economic fabric of the village, with many households having at least one critically ill member .

Community Response:

Residents and former village head Dharmendar Rathi have highlighted the widespread impact of pollution, with numerous deaths and chronic illnesses reported .

== Industrial and Environmental Concerns ==
Industrial Pollution:

Lack of proper waste-treatment facilities in industries has led to severe water pollution. The Uttar Pradesh Pollution Control Board (UPPCB) has imposed fines on polluting industries, but enforcement remains a challenge due to corruption and bureaucratic inefficiencies .

Environmental Activism:

Chandraveer Singh, a retired scientist, has been actively campaigning for clean water and better pollution control measures. His efforts include petitions to the NGT and public awareness campaigns .
