= Ahibaran =

Legendary Indian King

- Maharaja Ahibaran
- Predecessor: Maharaja Parmal
- Successor: Maharaja Bhadrawah
- Born: 26 December
- Burial: Baran (now Bulandshahr)
- Consort: Maharani Varanavati
- House: Ikshwaku
- Dynasty: Solar Dynasty
- Father: Maharaja Parmal
- Mother: Maharani Bhadrawati
- Religion: Hinduism

Maharaja Ahibaran (Sanskrit: अहिबरन, romanized: Ahibarana) was a legendary Indian king (Maharaja) of Baran, the capital and resident city of children of Pandavas. Maharaja Ahibaran was born on 26 December.

The Baranwal communities are descended from him and also celebrate his birth anniversary every year on 26 December.

== Etymology and names ==
Ahibaran has two meanings. Ahivaran means protector of forts. This was the accepted meaning amongst the learnt scholars of ancient and British times in Western UP. One English historian Gousse claimed that it could mean "snake coloured" (Ahi means snake and baran means colours). He is also known as Varan, Varna (which means forts, colours etc).

== Legends and beliefs ==
According to local legends, the town of Baran (now called Bulandshahr) was named after king Ahi-baran (literally "cobra-coloured"or one who owns forts, varan means forts and elephants as well). F. S. Growse, in the Journal of the Asiatic Society of Bengal, theorizes that no such king ever existed, instead he believed that Varana means forts and identified it with Varanavat from Mahabharat where Pandavas and their children settled. However, Western historians such as Edwin Atkinson in 1876 and various censuses and gazettes who researched Bulandshahar and nearby cities found numerous evidences of his existence.

Most Western and modern Indian historians such as Gouse, Atkinson and various British gazetteers found that Ahibaran and his descendants Barnwals were of the Pandava Tuar or modern Tomar Rajput tribe once ruling over much of modern Delhi, Haryana and Western UP. In Mahabharata, Pandavas shifted their capital to Varnavat from Ahar after the Great war. However, some historians like Pandit Rahul sanskritayan claimed that he was of the Yaudheya republic, based on his studies of local inscriptions and folklores.

The legends describe the ancestry of Ahibaran as follows: The children of King Dharmadat established their separate state, whose children are now called Bais Rajputs. King Harshavardhana was in his lineage. The child of the eldest son Subhankar continued to rule in his native state, Chandravati. Their offspring were King Tendumal and his descendant Maharaja Varaksh who took the side of religion in the war of Mahabharata and died by becoming a partisan of Pandavas. The remaining people left Chandravati and came to North India due to the storm in Chandravati. The clan of Maharaja Varaksha laid the foundation of his kingdom in a place called 'Ahar' in the presence of the Emperor of Hastinapur. In the generation of Maharaja Varaksha, King Parmal descendants from him. King Ahibaran born to King Parmal. King Ahibaran was married to Varanavati, the daughter of Khandav's King, who lives in a dense forest of selection trees located in the western part of the Ikshumati River in Antravredi.

One Agarwal historian has tried to link King Ahibaran as great grandson of Agrasen.

== Baran ==
According to Hindu mythology the pandavas had an encounter with Prajapati Daksh, father-in-law of Hindu lord Shiva; the place of their conversation, a pond, is in Bulandshahr. Later, after the fall of Hastinapur, the Pandavas ruled from Ahar, located in the north eastern part of Baran district. Over the years, Maharaja Paramaal built a fort in the region and later, Ahibaran, a Suryavanshi king built a tower named Baran and made the region his capital and named it to Baran.

The ancient palaces, building and temples found at places in Bhatora Veerpur, Ghalibpur in ruined form, are indicative of the antiquity of Baran. There are several other important places in the District from where statues belonging to the medieval age and objects of ancient temples have been found. Even today, several of these historical and ancient objects such as coins, statues and inscriptions etc. are preserved in the State Museum Lucknow.

=== Varanavati River ===
Varanavati River is a river of north india which flows throughout Bulandshahr district. The Varanavati River flows in almost the entire Bulandshahr district. The history of this river is as old as Bulandshahr. It is also said that the Varanavati River was the most holy river at that time. When Maharaja Ahibaran ruled there, he named the river on his wife name, Varanavati River. Earlier, when the Pandavas ruled there, the river was known as Ikshumati River, it is also described in the Atharvaveda. But presently this river is named after Kali, the Hindu goddess Kali.

=== Baran Tower ===
When Maharaja Ahibaran ruled in Bulandshahr, he also built Baran Tower there.

Baran is mentioned in Mahabharata. There is also evidence of baran, The old name 'Baran' can be still be traced in the old Government documents. According to the book Etihasik Sthanavali, Baran was very important and attractive place for many kings at that time. Sir Henry Miers Elliot writes quoting the Yamini which says that, in his Twelfth Expedition A.H. 409 (1018-1019 AD) after passing by the borders of Kashmir, that is, close under the sub-Himalayan range, and crossing the Jumna, Mahmud of Ghazni takes Baran. Later the seat of power went to Dors and Chauhans, with the rise of Hardatta, a Dor ruler who took possession of Baran along with Meerut and Koil. In 1192 CE when Muhammad Ghauri conquered parts of India, his Senapati (Military commander) Qutbu l-Din Aibak surrounded Fort Baran and with the help of traitors, was able to kill King Chandrasen Dor and in the process take control of the Baran kingdom. Baran is presently named as Bulandshahr which mean High city.

It was a rich and prosperous capital state of King Ahibaran's kingdom and numerous copper and gold coins with Greek and Pali inscriptions had been excavated at the site of the fort. According to Asian Folklore society the city Baran was the richest and famous at that time.

After the fall of Baran, the Baranwal community scattered to different parts of India, mostly to the Gangetic plains of India, and started living under the various names of Anand, Prasad, Prakash, Gupta, Bharti, Agrawal, Lal, Arya, Shah and Singh. Few of the baranwals adopted Modi surname, which is also this community.

== Baranwal gotras ==
Historically, there has been no unanimity regarding number and names of gotras, and there are regional differences between the list of gotras. The Baranwals are divided into five gotras (exogamous clans).

1. Garg
2. Vatsal (Vatsa)
3. Goyal/Gohil (Gautama)
4. Kashyap
5. Mudgal
6. Singhal (Shandilya)
