= Abbas Ali (Indian National Army) =

Indian freedom fighter (1920 – 2014)

- Born: 3 January 1920; Khurja, United Provinces of Agra and Oudh, British India
- Died: 11 October 2014 (aged 94); Aligarh, Uttar Pradesh, India
- Military career
- Allegiance: British India Azad Hind
- Branch: British Indian Army Indian National Army
- Service years: 1939–1947
- Rank: Captain
- Conflicts: World War II

Abbas Ali (3 January 1920 – 11 October 2014) was an Indian freedom fighter and politician who was a captain in the Indian National Army led by Subhas Chandra Bose. Later he joined the Socialist movement and was a close associate of Ram Manohar Lohia.

== Personal life ==
Abbas Ali was born at Khurja, Bulandshahr district of Uttar Pradesh, on 3 January 1920 into a Muslim Rajput family. From his early days he was inspired by the revolutionary ideas of Bhagat Singh and joined Naujawan Bharat Sabha, an organization founded by Singh and his colleagues while he was a high school student at Khurja. While pursuing his studies at Aligarh Muslim University he came in contact with Kunwar Muhammed Ashraf and become member of the All India Students Federation. On his inspiration to revolt in army he joined the British Indian Army in 1939. During his service in British Indian Army, during the Second World War, he was posted at various officers training schools of India such as Bangalore, RIASC Depot Ferozpur (Punjab), Waziristan (N.W.F.P), Naushera (N.W.F.P) Khanpur Camp (Delhi), Bareilly Cantt (United Province), Bhiwandi Army training Camp (Maharashtra), Singapore, Ipoh, Penang, Kualalampur (Malaya), Arakan, and Rangoon (now Yangoon).

In 1945 when Subhash Chandra Bose called for revolt he left the British Army and joined the Indian National Army (INA) or "Azad Hind Fauj" but later he was arrested, court-martialled and sentenced to death. When India gained independence in 1947 he was released by the Indian government.

== Political life ==
In 1948 Abbas Ali joined the Socialist Party led by Narendra Deva, Jayaprakash Narayan and Ram Manohar Lohia and remained associated with all the Socialist streams namely the Socialist Party, Praja Socialist Party, Samyukta Socialist Party and Socialist Party until its merger with the Janata Party in 1977. He was General Secretary of the Uttar Pradesh unit of Samyukta Socialist Party (SSP) in 1966–67, and of the Socialist Party in 1973–74, respectively and was member of the National Executive of the Socialist Party and of its Parliamentary board, 1974–77.

In 1967 he played a key role in the formation of the first Non-Congress Samyukta Vidhayak Dal (SVD) government in Uttar Pradesh led by Charan Singh, who became Prime Minister of India in 1979. During the Socialist movement (1948–74) he was arrested more than fifty times in various civil disobedience movements.

During the emergency (1975–77) he was imprisoned for 19 months under the Defense of India rule (DIR) and the Maintenance of Internal Security Act (MISA) and when emergency was lifted in 1977 and Janata Party came into power he became first President of the Uttar Pradesh unit of Janata party. In 1978 he was elected to the UP Legislative Council for six years. He had been a member of UP Sunni Central Waqf Board for six years. He wrote his autobiography Na Rahoon Kisi ka Dastenigar-Mera Safarnama in 2008, which was released on 3 January 2009, on his ninetieth birthday in New Delhi by Shri Surendra Mohan, Mulayam Singh Yadav, Ram Vilas Paswan, Ramjilal Suman, Saghir Ahmad and many other friends and colleagues.

Ali died on 11 October 2014 at Jawaharlal Nehru Medical College, Aligarh due to heart failure.
