= S. Samar Hasnain =

Syed Samar Hasnain FInstP, FRSC, is a Pakistani-born academic who is the inaugural Max Perutz professor of Molecular Biophysics at the University of Liverpool. In 1991, he became a Fellow of the Institute of Physics and in 2002 he became a Fellow of the Royal Society of Chemistry. In 1997, he became a Fellow of the Third World Academy of Sciences. He became Foreign Fellows of Pakistan Academy of Sciences in 2017.

== Education ==
In 1970 Hasnain earned a Bachelor of Science (Honours) an M.Sc. in 1972 from the University of Karachi and a Ph.D. in 1976 from the University of Manchester on Molecular Crystals, using synchrotron radiation from the NINA facility.

== Career ==
After spending a year as Post-Doctoral Research Associate at Manchester he joined DESY in Hamburg as a DESY Fellow working on the Storage ring Synchrotron Radiation Facility, where the synchrotron team created HASYLAB in 1978.

In 1979, Professor Hasnain joined the Daresbury Laboratory as a member of the team establishing the world’s first dedicated X-Ray synchrotron radiation source (the SRS). In 1989, he established the Molecular Biophysics group at Daresbury, where he remained as head of the group until March 2008 when he moved to the University of Liverpool. During 2011-2105 he was the International Lead for the Faculty of Health and Life Sciences of the university.

In 1982, Hasnain helped Perutz to resolve a controversy in the mechanism of oxygen uptake by haemoglobin.

He is the founding Editor of the International Union of Crystallography’s (IUCr) Journal of Synchrotron Radiation in 1993 and was Editor in Chief of IUCr Journals from 2012 to 2018. In 2014, he launched the IUCr’s flagship journal IUCrJ. He is a member of the International Advisory Board for IUCrJ. He is also an Editor of the journal Current opinion in Structural Biology.

== Research ==
He has been engaged with the SESAME synchrotron project in Jordan, launched under the umbrella of UNESCO, since its inception in 2004 and has been the UK Government’s representative on its council since its foundation. He has been chair of its Programme Review committee since 2018.

His main research interest is in structure-function studies of proteins and their complexes that are involved in biological electron transfer, nitrogen cycles and neurodegenerative diseases and in structure-based drug discovery targeted towards neurodegenerative diseases and malaria.

Hasnain has pioneered an approach to defining the structures of metalloproteins that combines not only X-ray crystallography and solution X-ray scattering, now used widely in the structural biology community, but also X-ray absorption fine structure (XAFS) and optical spectroscopies. More recently, he has used cryo-electron microscopy (cryo-EM), applied to a number of membrane proteins. The integration of spectroscopic methods with crystallography and the use of XFEL radiation for providing damage-free structures for redox proteins.

In 2019, Hasnain and Richard Catlow co-authored an article giving personal accounts of how their work in the fields of structural molecular biology, materials and catalytic science developed and evolved using synchrotron techniques.
