= The India-Pakistan Air War of 1965 =

- Author: P V S Jagan Mohan & Samir Chopra
- Language: English
- Genre: Aviation, History
- Published: 30 June 2005 Manohar Publishers
- Publication place: India
- Media type: Print (Hardback)
- Pages: 378 p.
- ISBN: 81-7304-641-7

The India-Pakistan Air War of 1965 is a 2005 aviation history book written by PVS Jagan Mohan and Samir Chopra. The book deals with the Indian Air Force's role in the Indo-Pakistani War of 1965 that started on 1 September 1965 and came to an end on 23 September 1965.

== Background ==
The air war was one of the last in which classic turning dogfights took place between the two belligerents. The Pakistan Air Force employed largely American hardware. The North American F-86 Sabre, the Lockheed F-104 Starfighter and the Martin B-57 Canberra (based on the British aircraft the English Electric Canberra). The Indian Air Force employed British, French & Russian aircraft like the Hawker Hunter, Folland Gnat, Canberra, de Havilland Vampire, MiG-21 and Dassault Mystere

The book describes the day-to-day operations of the Indian Air Force and is the first detailed account of the airwar from the Indian side.

== Reviews ==
Some reviews of the Book are available on the authors' web site at BharatRakshak.com.

- Review on Frontier India Journal
