= Siana, Asturias =

Siana
- Parish

- Location within Spain
- Country: Spain
- Autonomous community: Asturias
- Province: Asturias
- Municipality: Mieres

Siana is one of 15 parishes (administrative divisions) in Mieres, a municipality within the province and autonomous community of Asturias, in northern Spain.

== Villages ==
- Carricachos
- El Barrio Gonzalín
- El Castañíu
- El Discu
- El Norte
- El Praón
- El Preu Riguiru
- El Puente la Luisa
- El Requexéu
- El Vescón
- El Yenu la Cuba
- El Yenu la Tabla
- Espineo
- La Carretera
- La Costona
- La Estación
- La Faidosa
- La Fonda
- La Peña'l Cuervu
- La Quinta
- Los Pares
- Maricasina
- Panizales
- Ribono
- Rimeses
- Siana
- Sueros
