= Hindon River =

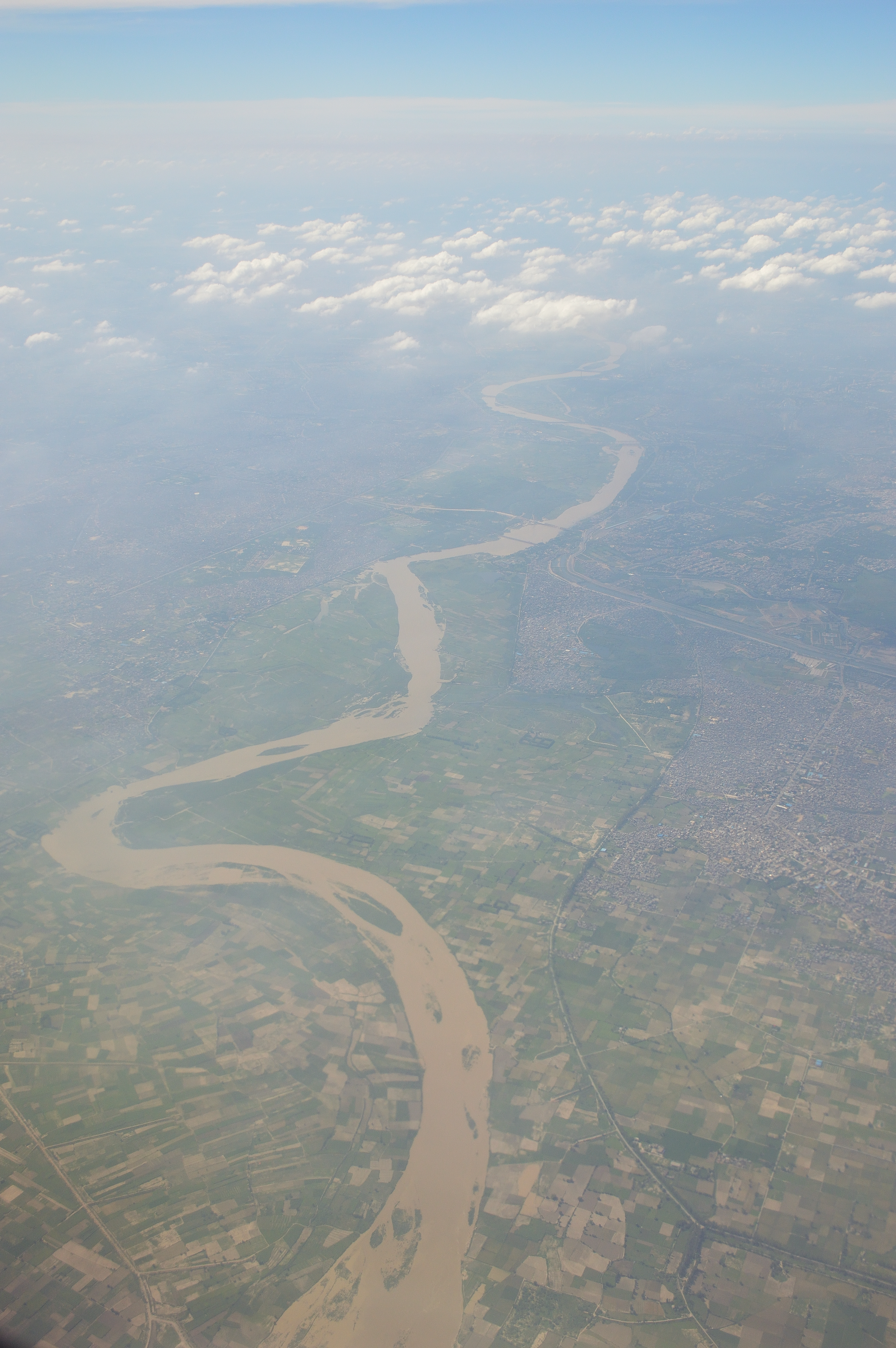
- Aerial view of river Hindon, Ghaziabad

Location
- Country: India
- Region: Uttar Pradesh

Physical characteristics
- Source: Rajaji Range, Sivalik Hills
  - location: Saharanpur district, Uttar Pradesh
  - coordinates: 35°05′N 77°08′E
- Mouth: Yamuna river
  - location: Sector-150, Noida, India
  - coordinates: 28°24′50″N 77°29′46″E
- Length: 400 km (250 mi)
- Basin size: 7,083 km^{2} (2,735 sq mi)

Hindon River is an Indian river that originates from the Shakumbhari Devi Range (in Upper Sivaliks foothills of Himalayas) in Saharanpur district of Uttar Pradesh and falls into Yamuna river near Gautam Buddha University in Noida.

== Background ==
=== Etymology ===
Hindon comes from its ancient name Harnadi.

=== History ===
An Indus Valley civilization (fl. 3300–1300 BCE) site, Alamgirpur is located along the Hindon River, 28 kilometres (17 mi) from Delhi.

During 1857–58, Ghaziabad city was a scene of fighting during the Indian Mutiny, when Indian soldiers in the Bengal Army that were under the British East India Company mutinied but soon turned into a widespread uprising against British rule in India. The Hindon River, in particular, was the site of several skirmishes between Indian troops and British soldiers in 1857 including the Battle of Badli-ki-Serai and today, the graves of the British soldiers and officers can still be seen. Ghaziabad's place in Northern Indian history is assured by the birth of many freedom fighters who played a role in various revolutions all dedicated to the attainment of freedom for all who have lived – and are still living – there.

=== Mythology ===
Near Sardhana lies the ancient Mahadev Temple that is believed to be dating from the Mahabharata period, and where the Pandavas prayed before leaving for the Lakshagrih, the notorious palace made of lac by Duryodhana, at the confluence of the Hindon (previously known as Harnandi) and Krishna rivers (Kali River, Kali Nadi) at Varnavrat, the present Barnava, and where the prince resided with their mother Kunti.

== Hydrology ==
=== Topography ===
It is entirely rainfed, having an approximate catchment area of 7,083 square kilometres (2,735 mi^{2}).

It flows between Ganges and Yamuna rivers for 400 kilometres (250 mi) through Muzaffarnagar district, Meerut district, Baghpat district, Ghaziabad district and Gautam Buddh Nagar district before it joins Yamuna river at Sector-150, Noida. The Hindon Air Force Base of the Indian Air Force also lies on its bank in the Ghaziabad district on the outskirts of Delhi.

=== Tributaries ===
The Kali river is a tributary of Hindon. Kali originates in the Rajaji Range of Sivalik Hills and travels about 150 kilometres (93 mi) passing through Saharanpur, Muzaffarnagar, Meerut and Bagpat districts, merges with Hindon River at Pithlokar near Sardhana. After that Hindon merges with the Yamuna River in Noida. The Kali river is also highly polluted and adds to the pollution of the Hindon, as it passes through a populated and industrial belt of Uttar Pradesh.

== Issues ==
=== Pollution ===
Ten major drains of Ghaziabad dump sewage and electronic waste including 310 industries which discharge toxic industrial effluents, with poor treatment as the sewage treatment plant do not operate at their full capacity. The major polluters include Tronica City Apparel Park, pulp, tanneries and dyeing industries.

=== Dead biodiversity ===
Dissolved oxygen levels are zero throughout the length of this river due to the heavy toxic load, thus killing the biological diversity of river ecology.

== Conservation ==
=== Campaigns ===
Several NGOs are running campaigns for the rejuvenation this river, such as the Hindon, Kali and Krishna Bachao Abhiyan (Save the Hindon, Kali and Krishna rivers) campaign by the locals. NGOs with RWA are working to make locals aware and trying to remove solid non-biodegradable wastes like plastic from the river while encouraging farmers to reduce the use of chemical fertilizes and pesticides near the flood plains.

=== Riverfront development ===
In 2025, Uttar Pradesh announced a Rs 40 cr plan to develop 1.6 km long, 800 meters on both side of the riverfront, from City Forest southeast of Hindon Airport to the Raj Nagar Extension (RNE). This Hindon Riverfront, between the flood prevention embankment and the Hindon City Outer Ring Road, will be developed along the lines of Lucknow's Gomti Riverfront.

== See also ==
- Ganges River, another major river of Uttar Pradesh
- Sarasvati River
