= Kuar Lachman Singh =

Indian deputy collector

- Born: 9 October 1826
- Died: 1896 (aged 69–70)
- Occupation: Deputy collector of the district of Bulandshahr
- Known for: Translation from Sanskrit of Shakuntala and Meghadūta
- Notable work: Historical and Statistical Memoir of Zila Bulandshahar (1874)

Kuar Lachman Singh, also known as Raja Lachhman Singh, (9 October 1826 – 1896), was an Indian deputy collector of the district of Bulandshahr, North-Western Provinces (NWP), India, and author of Historical and Statistical Memoir of Zila Bulandshahar (1874), commissioned by Lieutenant Governor of the NWP William Muir. (Note: Muir's daughter had married William Lowe, a former district collector in Bulandshahr.) He also produced a Hindi translation from Sanskrit of Shakuntala and Meghadūta.

== Selected publications ==
- Historical and Statistical Memoir Of Zila Bulandshahar. Allahabad: The North Western Provinces Government Press, Allahabad. 1874. (with a note by William Muir)
