= Kali River (Uttar Pradesh) =

Coordinates: 27°21′N 81°23′E

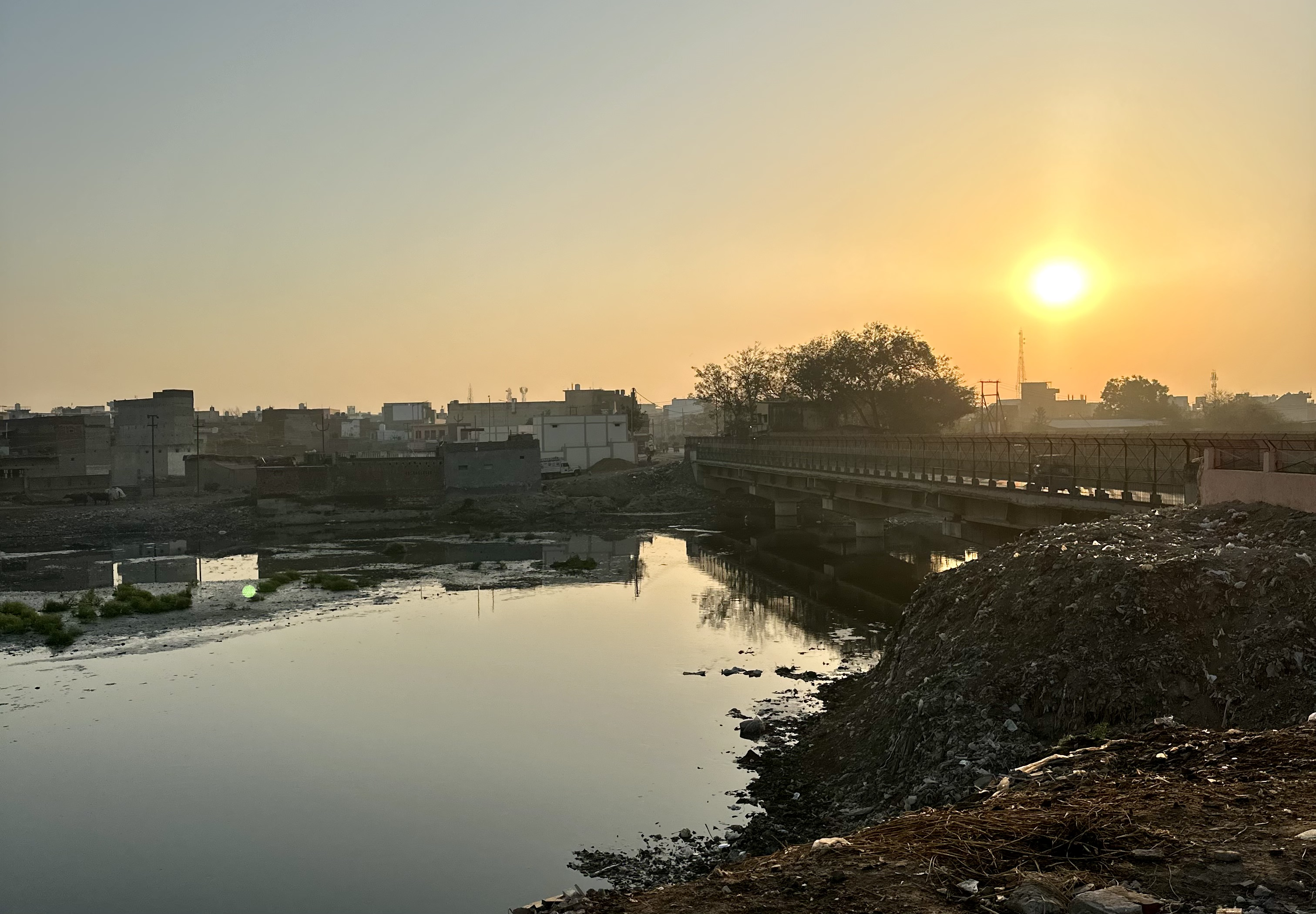
- Kali Nadi through Bulandshahr, Uttar Pradesh

Location
- Country: India

Physical characteristics
- Source: Rajaji Range, Sivalik Hills
  - location: Uttar Pradesh
- Mouth: Hindon River
  - location: Uttar Pradesh
- Length: 150 km (93 mi)
- Basin size: 750 km^{2} (290 sq mi)

The Kali River, commonly known as Kali Nadi, originates in the Upper Sivaliks and passes through Saharanpur, Muzaffarnagar and Baghpat districts of Uttar Pradesh, before merging with Hindon River (at Barnava, Baghpat), which goes on to merge with the Yamuna River (near Delhi), which itself goes to merge with the Ganga River, which finally flows into the Bay of Bengal. The total length of the river from its origin up to its confluence with the Hindon river is 150 km. The river is named after the Hindu goddess Kali.

== Pollution and ecology ==
The Kali River is polluted from both raw sewage and industrial discharge. It is one of the rivers that is targeted for clean-up under the National Ganga River Basin Authority (NGRBA).
