= Siana =

Siyana
- City
- Location in Uttar Pradesh, India Siyana (India)
- Coordinates: 28.626871°N 78.060737°E
- Country: India
- State: Uttar Pradesh
- District: Bulandshahr
- Named after: Lord Krishna
- Elevation: 216.144 m (709.13 ft)

Population (2011)
  - Total: 44,415

Language
  - Official: Hindi
  - Additional official: Urdu
- Time zone: UTC+5:30 (IST)
- Postal code: 203412
- Area code: +05736
- Vehicle registration: UP13
- Sub-district code: 000747
- Lok Sabha constituency: Bulandshahr
- Assembly constituency: siyana

Siyana is a city and a municipal board with 25 wards, situated in Siyana Tehsil in the district of Bulandshahr in the Indian state of Uttar Pradesh.

== Demographics ==
As of 2011 Indian Census, Siana NPP had a total population of 44,415, of which 23,221 were males and 21,194 were females. Population within the age group of 0 to 6 years was 6,463. The total number of literates in Siana was 26,014, which constituted 58.6% of the population with male literacy of 66.2% and female literacy of 50.2%. The effective literacy rate of 7+ population of Siana was 68.5%, of which male literacy rate was 77.6% and female literacy rate was 58.7%. The Scheduled Castes and Scheduled Tribes population was 7,454 and 1 respectively. Siana had 6818 households in 2011.

== Location ==
Siana is located:

- 101 km from India's capital New Delhi
- 62 km from the Meerut
- 33 km from district headquarters Bulandshahr
- 434 km from state capital Lucknow
- 19 km from the holy Garhmukteshwar (Garh Ganga)
