= Syana tehsil =

Siyana Tehsil Syana, Siana
- Tehsil
- Nickname: Siana
- Tehsil location on map
- Coordinates: 28.627910°N 78.060914°E
- Country: India
- State: Uttar Pradesh
- Elevation: 216.144 m (709.13 ft)

Population (2011)
  - Total: 86,842

Languages
  - Official: Hindi
- Time zone: UTC+5:30 (IST)
- Postal code: 245XXX/203XXX(New)
- Telephone code: +91-5736
- Vehicle registration: UP13 XXXX
- Sub-district code: 000747
- Lok Sabha constituency: Bulandshahr
- Assembly constituency: Syana

Syana Tehsil Sayānā Tahasīl) is one of the seven tehsils (sub-districts) in district of Bulandshahar, India. Syana tehsil has 04 Census towns and 169 villages. The name of the tehsil is also written as "Siana" or "Siyana". As per Delimitation order of 2008 by Election Commission of India, the name of the tehsil is "Syana".

== Census towns ==
Syana Tehsil comprises four census towns. The biggest census town is Siana Nagar Palika Parishad (population of 44,415) and smallest is Bhawan Bahadur Nagar Nagar Panchayat (population of 10,188). Following is the list of all the towns along with the population as per 2011 census.

- Bhawan Bahadur Nagar Nagar Panchayat (10,188)
- Bugrasi Nagar Panchayat (14,992)
- Khanpur Nagar Panchayat (17,247)
- Siana Nagar Palika Parishad (44,415)

== Climate ==
Climate data for Syana Tehsil
Month	Jan	Feb	Mar	Apr	May	Jun	Jul	Aug	Sep	Oct	Nov	Dec	Year
Mean daily maximum °C (°F)	17 (63)	20 (68)	25 (77)	32 (90)	31 (88)	31 (88)	29 (84)	29 (84)	29 (84)	27 (81)	24 (75)	20 (68)	26 (79)
Mean daily minimum °C (°F)	07 (45)	09 (48)	11 (52)	15 (59)	17 (63)	17 (63)	19 (66)	21 (70)	19 (66)	13 (55)	12 (54)	08 (46)	14 (57)
Average precipitation mm (inches)	18 (0.7)	24 (0.9)	12 (0.5)	12 (0.5)	21 (0.8)	99 (3.9)	168 (6.6)	207 (8.1)	99 (3.9)	27 (1.1)	6 (0.2)	9 (0.4)	702 (27.6)
Source: World Weather Online

== See also ==
- Bulandshahr district
- Syana (Assembly constituency)
