= Alexander Willcocks =

- Born: 15 May 1851; Bengal
- Died: 14 January 1929 (aged 71)
- Occupation: Surgeon

Alexander John Willcocks (15 May 1851-14 January 1929) was a British Civil Surgeon in Bulandshahr, North West Provinces, India.

== Early life and education ==
Alexander Willcocks was born on 15 May 1851. His brothers included Sir James Willcocks and Sir William Willcocks. He trained in medicine at Aberdeen University and Guy's Hospital, gaining his MBCM in 1873, and MD from Aberdeen in 1883.

== Career ==
According to Frederic Growse in his book titled Bulandshahr: Or, Sketches of an Indian District, between April 1883 and March 1884, as Civil Surgeon based at Bulandshahr, Willcocks performed near three times as many operations there as had been done the previous year.

== Death ==
Willcocks died on 14 January 1929 at Dehradun.

== Selected publications ==
- Willcocks, AJ (August 1884). "A Year's Ophthalmic and General Surgery". The Indian Medical Gazette. 19 (8): 226–228. PMC 5166782. PMID 28999128.
- Willcocks, AJ (August 1885). "Nine Cases of Ovariotomy". The Indian Medical Gazette. 20 (8): 235–238. PMC 5184657. PMID 29001354.
- Willcocks, AJ (November 1887). "Prince of Wales' Hospital, Benares: Case of Ovariotomy". The Indian Medical Gazette. 22 (11): 328–329. PMC 5128544. PMID 28999804.
