= Frederic Growse =

British civil servant in North-Western Provinces, India

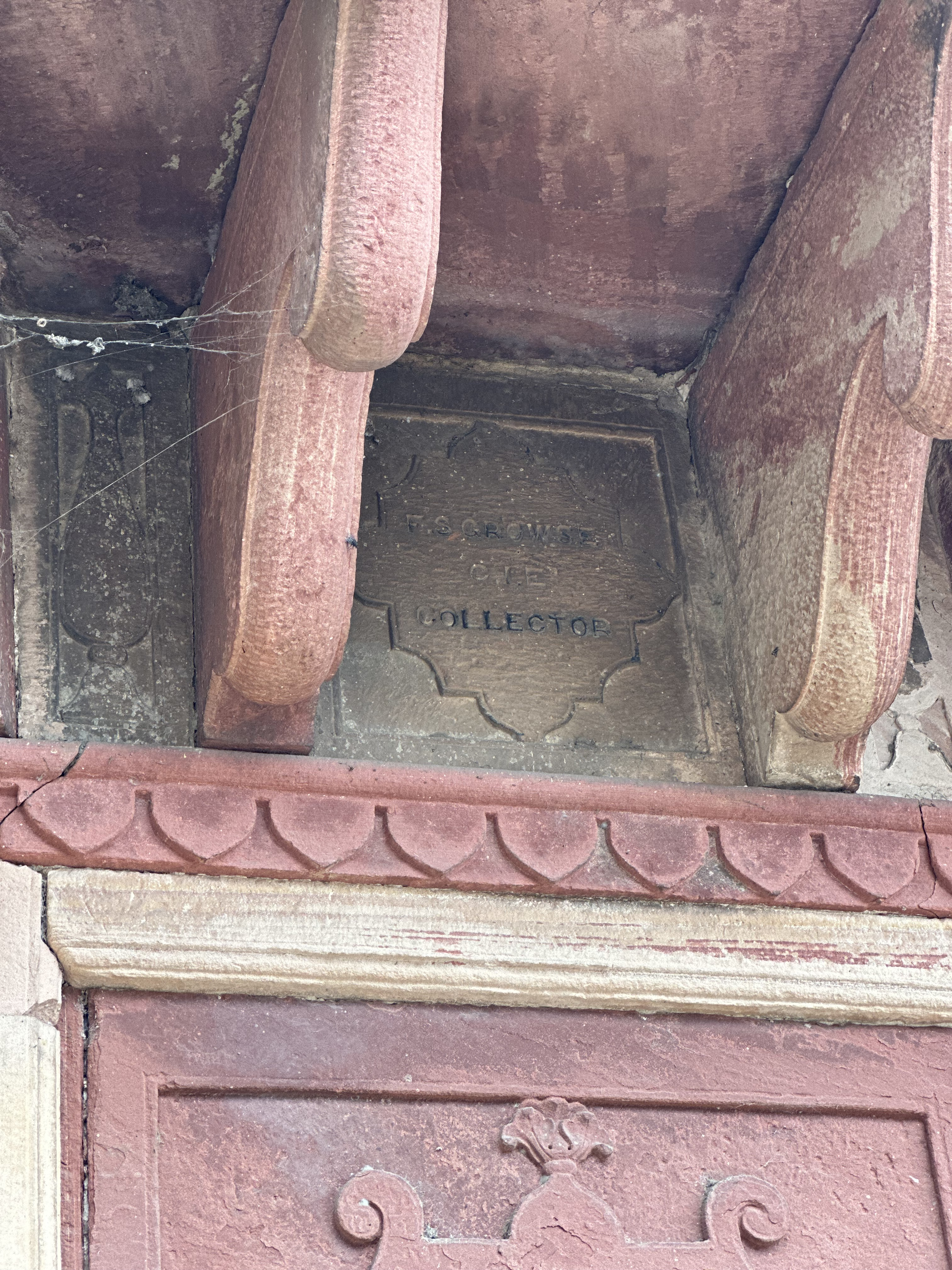
- Growse engraving at Bathing Ghat, Bulandshahr
- Born: Frederic Salmon Growse; 1836; Suffolk, England
- Died: 19 May 1893 (aged 56–57); Haslemere, Surrey, England
- Occupation: District magistrate and collector for Indian Civil Service
- Years active: 1860–1890
- Known for: Founding the Government Museum, Mathura; Encouraging local Indian handicrafts; Buildings: Catholic Church of the Sacred Heart, Mathura, Garden Gate, Bathing Ghat and Town Hall, Bulandshahr
- Notable work: English translation of the Ramayana of Tulsidas; Bulandshahr; or, Sketches of an Indian district; social, historical and architectural (1884)

Frederic Salmon Growse CIE (1836 – 19 May 1893) was a British civil servant of the Indian Civil Service (ICS), Hindi scholar, archaeologist and collector, who served in Mainpur, Mathura, Bulandshahr and Fatehpur during British rule in India.

Growse studied Indian literature and languages, and founded the Catholic Church of the Sacred Heart and the Government Museum, both at Mathura. Between 1876 and 1883, he published in series, the first English translation of the Ramayana of Tulsidas. He also wrote Mathurá: A district memoir (1880) and a description of the district of Bulandshahr (1884) and of its new architecture (1886).

Described as "never a persona grata to his superiors", he was nonetheless gazetted CIE in 1879. At Bulandshahr between 1878 and 1884 he caused a number of buildings to be constructed using local designs and craftsmen. In 1882, he donated a collection of Indian pottery to the British Museum.

== Early life and education ==
Frederic Growse (also spelled Frederick) was born in 1836 in Bildeston, Suffolk, England, the third and youngest son of Robert and Mary Growse. He matriculated from Oriel College in 1855 and then gained a scholarship at Queen's College, Oxford, from where he received a master's degree after being in the first class of moderations and second class of classics. He was a contemporary of Charles Crosthwaite. In 1859, he passed the ICS examination. At an unknown date he converted to Catholicism and was described as a "zealous observer of its precepts" but "without any bigotry".

== Career ==
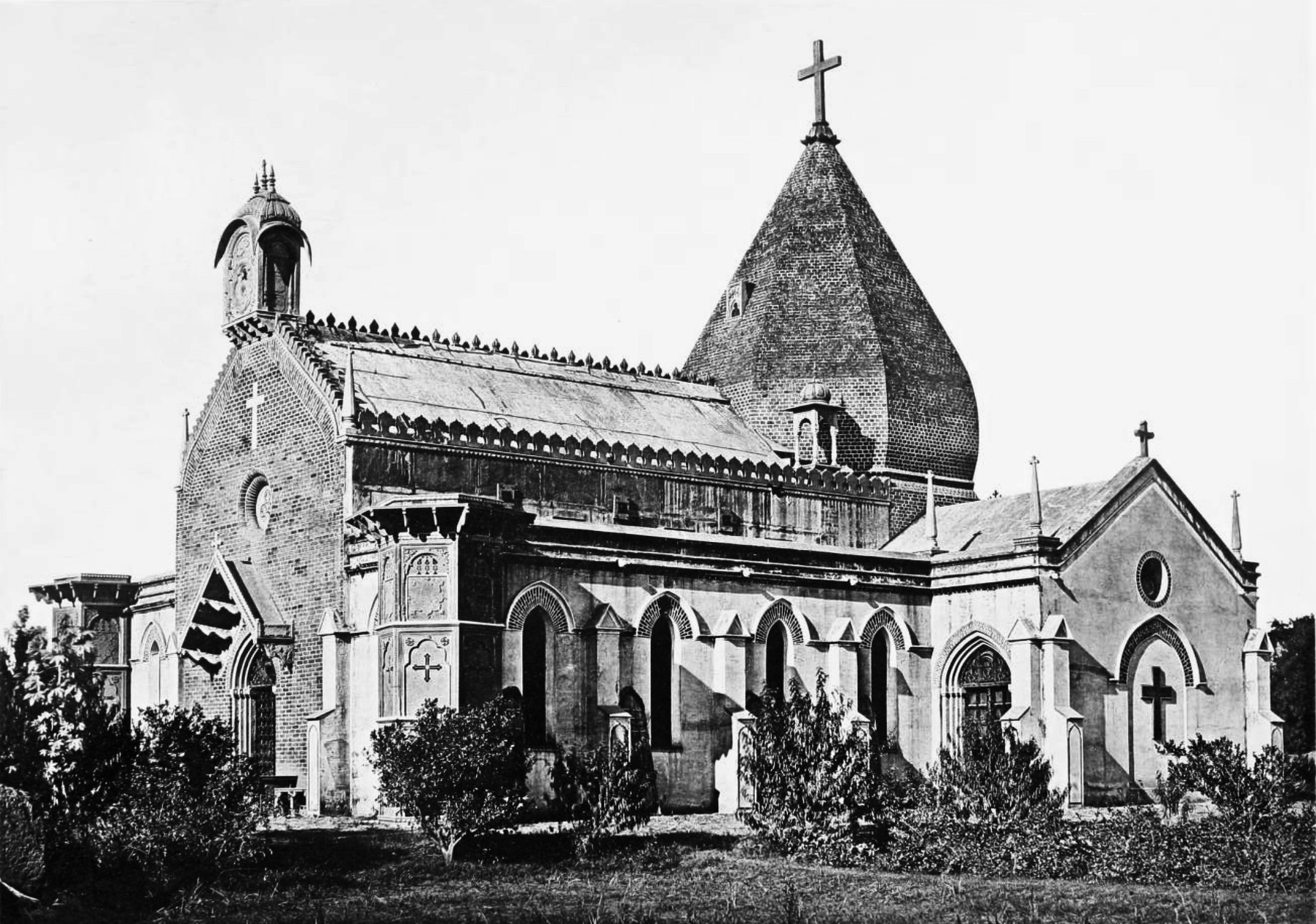
Catholic Church of the Sacred Heart, Mathura

Having joined the Indian Civil Service on 10 August 1860, Growse arrived in India on 17 November 1860. The following year he was posted to the North-Western Provinces, one of the regions of British India. There, he studied Indian literature and languages. In 1868, he was a district assistant in Mainpuri (western UP) and in the 1870s he was appointed district collector at Mathura, the birth place of Krishna. There he built the Catholic Church of the Sacred Heart, paying for a third of its cost. Its design was based on John Ruskin's principles of architecture, and it was built using local craftsmanship, but was unfinished at the time of his transfer out of the district. He also founded the Government Museum there in 1874.

=== Bulandshahr ===
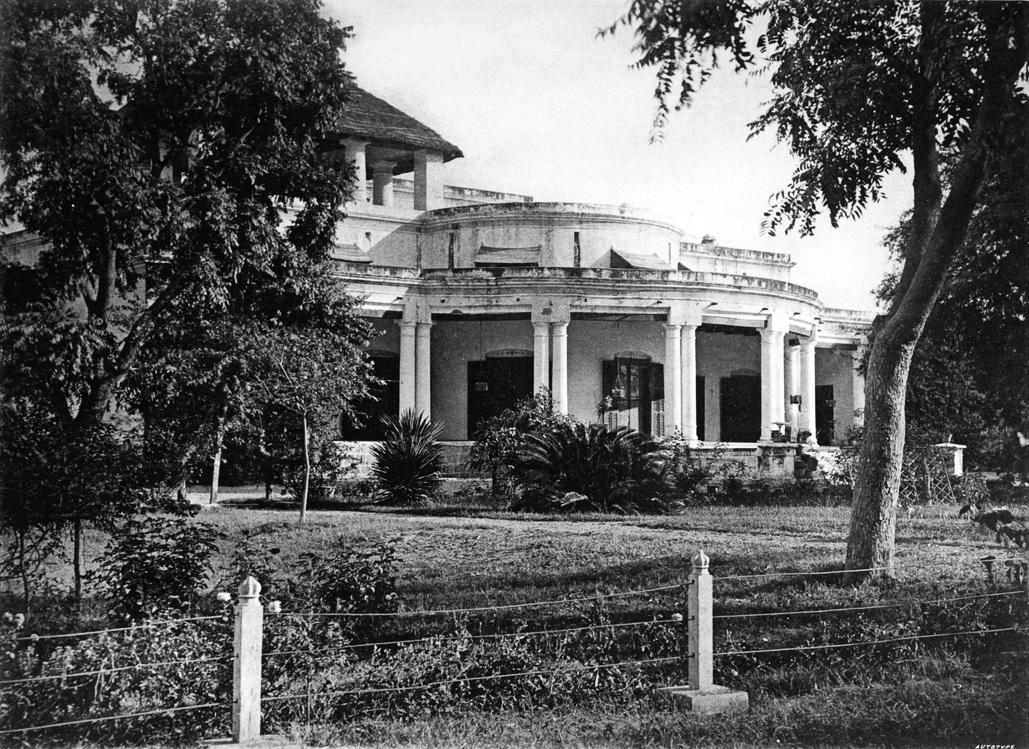
Collector's House, Bulandshahr, 19th century

In November 1877 Growse was appointed district magistrate and deputy collector at Bulandshahr and in 1878 made Bulandshahr's Magistrate and Collector. There he lived at Collector's House until 1884. By that time he was a fellow of Calcutta University. In 1878 he commissioned Mainpuri craftsmen to produce reredos for a Catholic church in Suffolk. At the time, Elizabeth King, the wife of Robert Moss King, district collector of Meerut, visited Growse in Bulandshahr and noted some detail of the reredos production in her memoirs, The Diary of a Civilian's Wife in India 1877-1882. (Note: Elizabeth Augusta Moss King accompanied her husband to India, and on their second tour wrote diaries published in two volumes in 1884.)

At Bulandshahr between 1878 and 1884 Growse caused a number of buildings to be constructed using native designs and craftsmen which he saw as more in keeping with his "Gothic principles" than the utilitarian colonial buildings preferred by the Public Works Department (PWD). In 1979 he received the CIE. According to Gavin Stamp, Growse so irritated the PWD that they had him moved to another district. In May 1884, at a meeting of the Royal Society of Arts, Purdon Clarke, keeper of Indian art at the South Kensington museum, was one of the first to commend the work of Growse in Bulandshahr, crediting particularly his efforts on the Bulandshahr Chowk. He encouraged and assisted in the construction of the Bathing Ghat, Garden Gate and the Town Hall. He was one of a few self-professed historians who held the view that Indian architecture was produced through patronage, and achieved by trust rather than written contracts. His work was praised by John Lockwood Kipling in The Journal of Indian Art (1884).

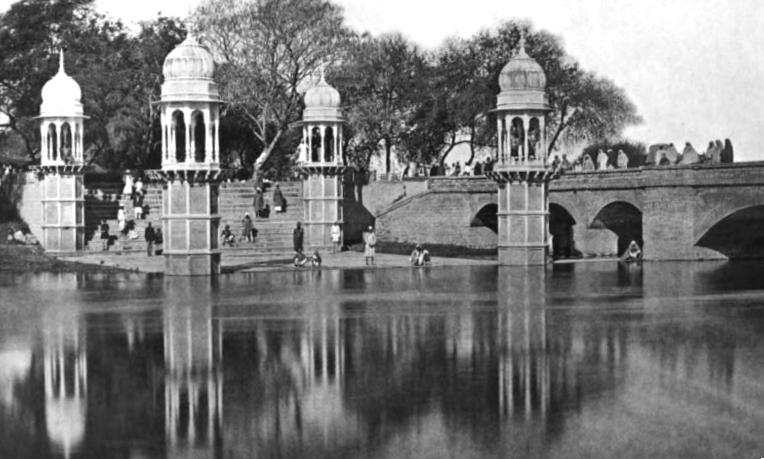
Bathing ghat Bulandshahr 1880

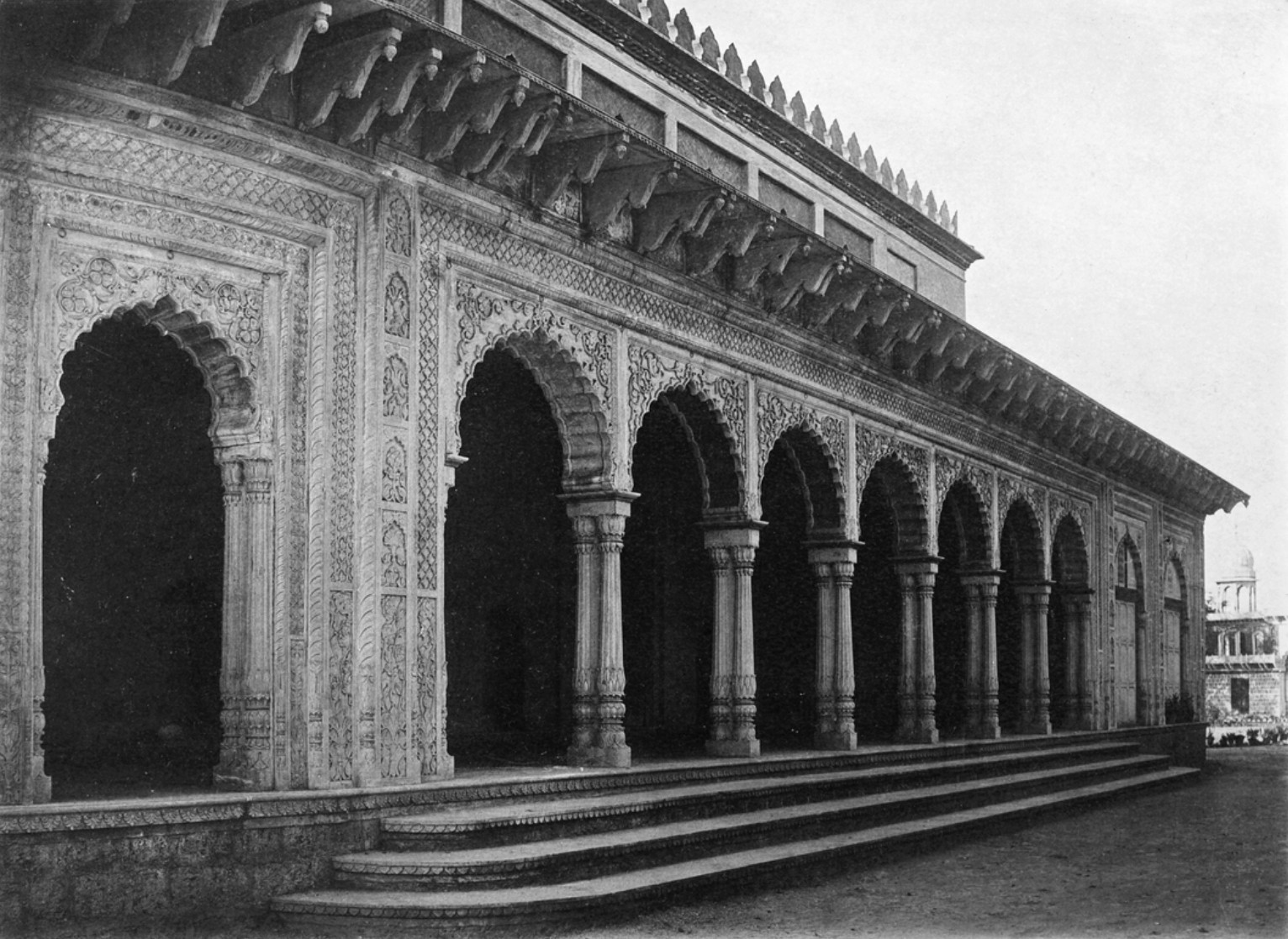
Town Hall

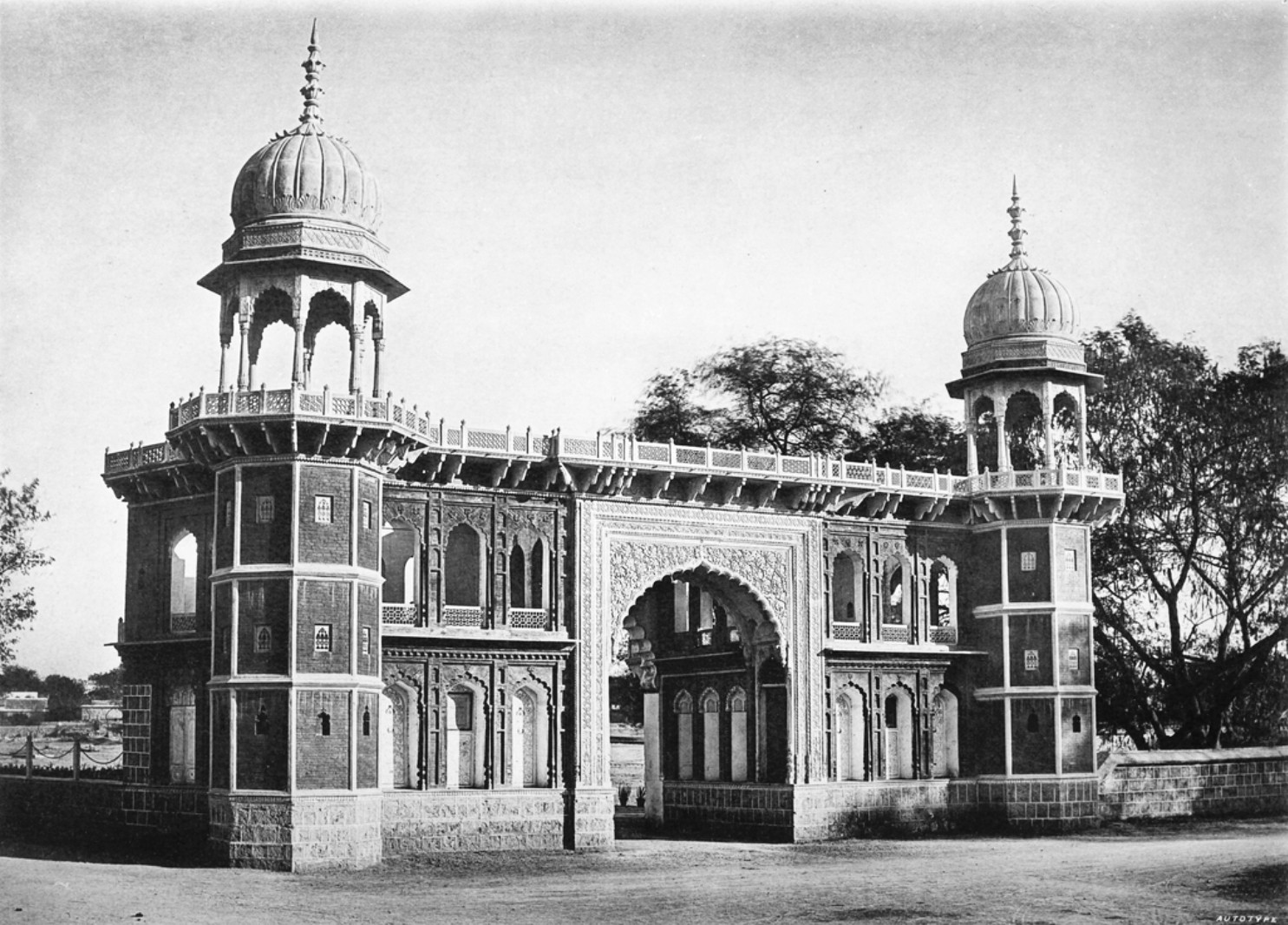
Garden Gate

=== Later ===
Growse was district magistrate and collector at Fatehpur, Uttar Pradesh, from 1885 to 1886 where he produced a supplement to the Fatehpur Gazetteer, paying particular attention to architecture and archaeology which had been largely ignored by the author of the original gazetteer in 1884 who Growse thought had probably not visited any of the places about which he had written, relying instead on native informants who were not equipped to comment on such matters.

He donated a collection of Indian pottery to the British Museum in 1882.

== Writing ==
The Rámáyana of Tulsi Dás

In 1868 at Mainpur, Growse produced an article on the Prithviraj Raso, a poem about the 12th-century Hindu Emperor, Prithviraj Chauhan.

In 1874, six years after the first local text on the subject was published, the government press at Allahabad published his enlarged version in a book titled Mathura: A District memoir with illustrations by the Autotype Fine Art Company. In it he included early Buddhist archeology, and chapters on Hindu sects and the origin of place names.

In Mathura, he became intrigued by the popularity among its ordinary people of the Ramayana of Tulsidas. In 1876 he published his translation into English of the original text by Tulsidas. Growse published a revised version in 1880 as a four-volume second edition and published a full version in 1883. It was the first illustrated version of the complete English translation of the Ramcharitmanas, which he completed in Bulandshahr. He writes in the introduction that the epic Sanskrit Ramayana of Valmiki had been translated into several languages including English, but the more popular Hindi version, a retelling of Rama's life, titled Ramcharitmanas by Tulsidas, previously had not been translated into English.

In 1884 he published Bulandshahr; or, Sketches of an Indian district; social, historical and architectural. His obituary in the journal of the Royal Asiatic Society of Great Britain and Ireland describes this work as "chiefly interesting as showing how he was able to transfer his sympathies from a Hindu to a Musulman population, when the requirements of a bureaucratic regime compelled his removal".

== Later life ==
Due to ill-health, Growse retired to England in 1890, where he lived at Thursley Hall, Haslemere, and was active in the Suffolk Institute of Archaeology and Natural History. He updated and revised their volume of materials on the history of the Suffolk parish of Bildeston in 1891 which was published in 1892.

== Death and legacy ==
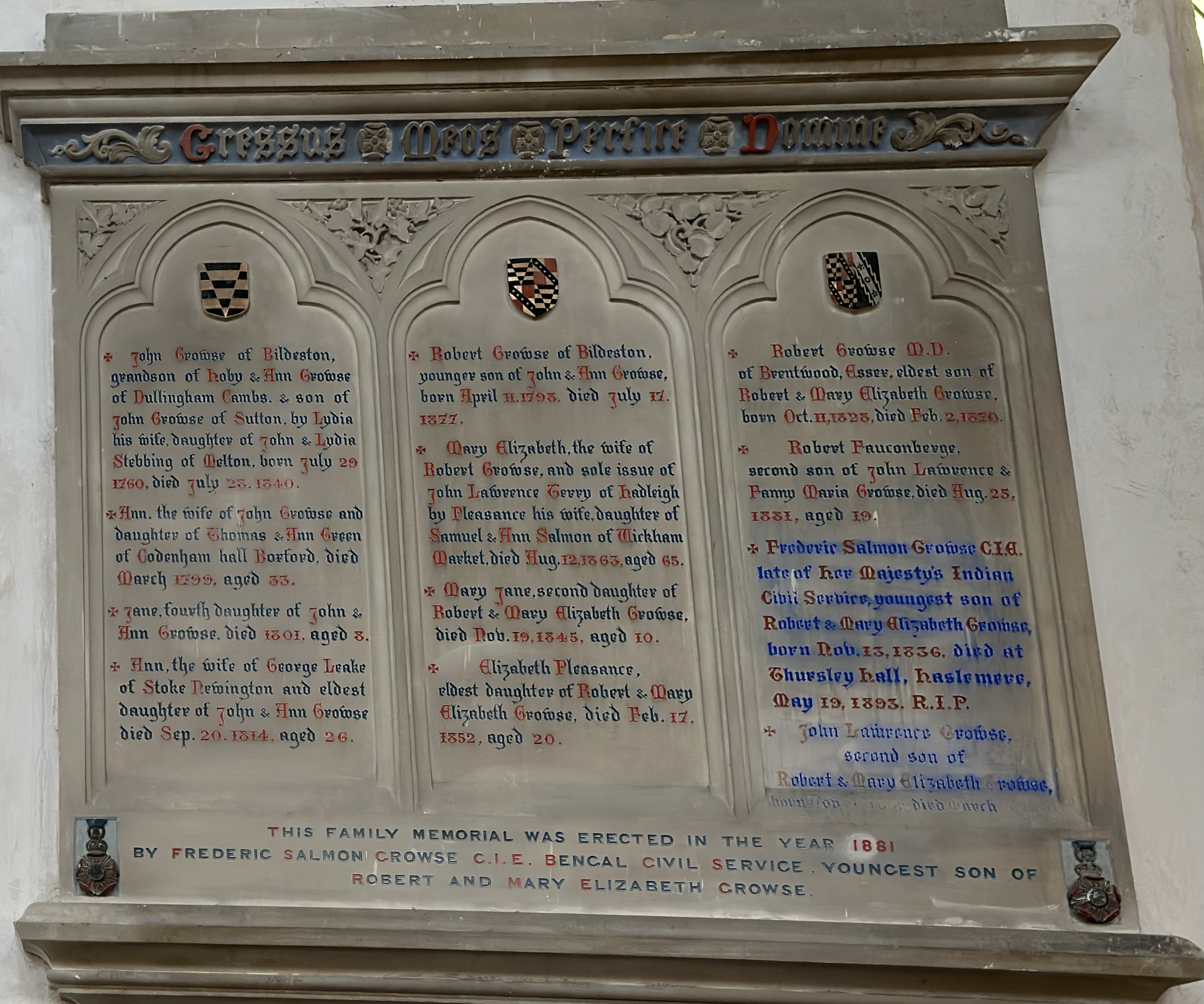
Growse memorial St Mary's Church, Bildeston

Growse died from tuberculosis at Haslemere, Surrey, on 19 May 1893. Probate was granted to Lydia Catherine Growse on an estate of £5,224. Growseganj Gate, one of Bulandshahr's four gates is named for him.

In 2014, a seminar was given at the Nehru Memorial Museum & Library titled "Familiarity with the Familiar: Frederick Salmon Growse's Fragmentary Visions of the Architecture of Bulandshahr, 1878–1886".

== See also ==
- John Beames

== Selected publications ==
=== Articles ===
- "Bulandshahr Antiquities", Journal of the Asiatic Society of Bengal, Vol. 48 (1879), No. 4, pp. 270–276.
- “The Art of 'Tar-Kashi' or Wire- Inlay”. Journal of Indian Art and Industry, no. 22, (1888): 51- 56.

=== Books ===
- Mathurá: A district memoir. Allahabad: North-western Provinces and Oudh Government Press, 1874.
- The Rámáyana of Tulsi Dás, Book 1. Childhood. Allahabad: North-western Provinces and Oudh Government Press, 1876.
- The Rámáyana of Tulsi Dás, Book 1. Childhood. Allahabad: North-western Provinces and Oudh Government Press, 1880.
- The Rámáyana of Tulsi Dás. Part III-VI. Allahabad: North-western Provinces and Oudh Government Press, 1880.
- The Rámáyana of Tulsi Dás. Allahabad: North-western Provinces and Oudh Government Press, 1883.
- Bulandshahr; or, Sketches of an Indian district; social, historical and architectural. Benares: Medical Hall Press, 1884.
- Indian Architecture of To-day as Exemplified in New Buildings in the Bulandshahr District Part I. North-Western Provinces and Oudh Government Press, 1885. Part II. Benares: Medical Hall Press, 1886.
- A Supplement to the Fatehpur Gazetteer. Allahabad: Government Press, 1887.
- Materials for a History of the Parish of Bildeston, in the County of Suffolk. With pedigrees and genealogical notices ... Compiled in the year 1859, revised and brought up to date in 1891, by F. S. Growse. London: Mitchell & Hughes, 1892.
