= Agra Central Jail =

Prison center in Agra, India

Agra Central Jail began construction in 1849, under the supervision of William Woodcock, of the Bengal Civil Service. John W. Tyler took over as its superintendent in 1876. In the late 19th century the prison became a major exporter of carpets. Abdul Karim was assistant clerk there before travelling to London to attend the Colonial and Indian Exhibition. Sir Horace Williamson was based there in the early 20th century.
