= Medical Hall Press =

Medical Hall Press was a publishing house based in Benares, India in the nineteenth century, during which it was the city's foremost press. It published Sanskrit philosophical literature and plays, including Jayadeva's Prasannaraghava and Rajashekhara's Balaramayana. It also published Hindi writer Premchand's now-lost novel 1907 Kishna. Its secondary literature includes reference material like textbooks in Hindi and English, which were translated to Urdu, as well as dictionaries. The press also published missionary literature as well as colonial photography and scholarship, including Frederic Growse's Bulandshahr: Or, Sketches of an Indian District.

The press had fonts for various scripts, including Devanagari, Latin script, Arabic, and Urdu.

Medical Hall Press, founded by E.J. Lazarus in 1854, is also known as E.J. Lazarus & Co. It was one of three European-owned printing presses in nineteenth-century colonial India. It operated until at least the 1920s.
