= John W. Tyler =

British surgeon and superintendent of the central prison in Agra, India

Sir John W. Tyler FRCS (Edin.) CIE
- Born: c. 1840; India
- Died: 12 May 1913 (aged 72–73); London, England
- Education: Calcutta Medical College; University of St. Andrews
- Occupations: Superintendent of the central prison in Agra, India
- Known for: Production of carpets at Agra Central Jail; Recruiting Abdul Karim ("the Munshi") for Queen Victoria

Sir John William Tyler FRCS (Edin.) CIE (c. 1840 – 12 May 1913) was a British surgeon and superintendent of the central prison in Agra, India, a position he held for 14 years. While superintendent he developed the prison as an important manufacturing centre for high-quality carpets. In 1886, he escorted 34 Indians, mostly prisoners, to the Colonial and Indian Exhibition of 1886 in London, where their craftsmanship in weaving carpets was displayed. At Queen Victoria's request, he recruited the servant Abdul Karim, later known as "the Munshi", who served her for the last 14 years of her life.

Tyler was initially posted to the civil surgeoncy in the North-Western Provinces, before being appointed as superintendent of the prison at Meerut, and thereafter at Agra. He was knighted in 1888. In 2017, he was portrayed in the film Victoria & Abdul.

== Early life and education ==
John Tyler was born on 6 December 1839. He became fluent in Hindustani. He received his basic education at Doveton College in Calcutta (now Kolkata), before gaining admission to Calcutta Medical College to study medicine. He travelled to England in 1861 and acquired licentiates of the Society of Apothecaries, Royal Colleges of Surgeons, and the Royal College of Physicians of Edinburgh. He received his MD from the University of St. Andrews in 1862 and in 1870 was elected a fellow of the Royal College of Physicians of Edinburgh.

== Early career ==
In 1863, Tyler joined the Uncovenanted Indian Medical Service in the North-Western Provinces, later known as the United Provinces of Agra and Oudh, serving initially as a civil surgeon. He was transferred to Manipuri in 1866 and in 1873 became superintendent of the prison at Meerut. Three years later, he became superintendent of Agra Central Jail, a position he held for 14 years, during which time he developed the prison as an important manufacturing centre for high quality carpets. He donated one such Persian carpet to British civil servant and scholar Frederic Growse for the Catholic church at Mathura, built in the 1870s.

== Visits to London ==
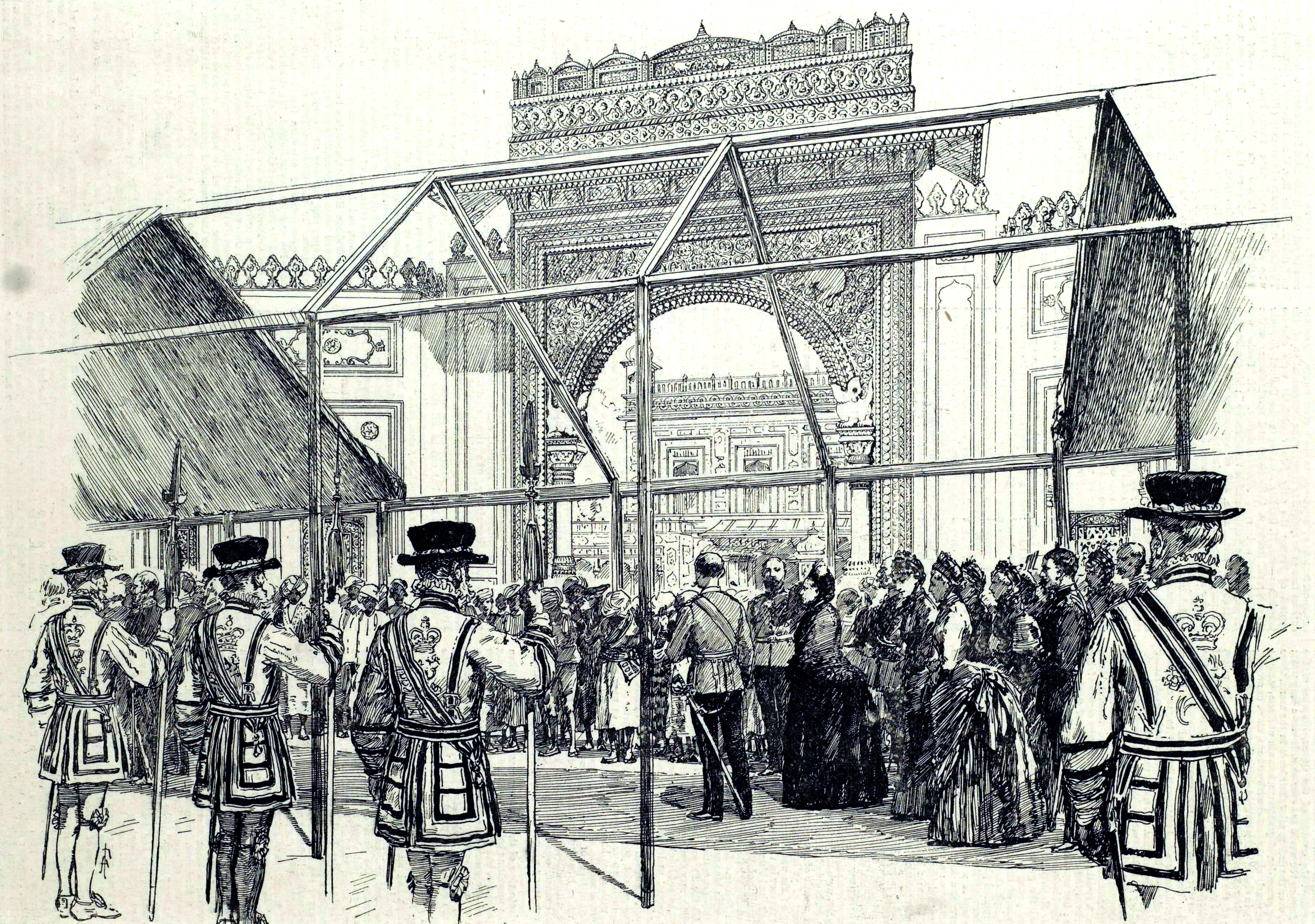
"The Queen Opening the Colonial and Indian Exhibition: Procession passing the principal entrance to the Indian Palace", The Illustrated London News, May 1886.

In 1886, in his "special duty", Tyler attracted much publicity when he escorted 34 Indians to the Colonial and Indian Exhibition of 1886 in London, where their craftsmanship in weaving carpets was displayed. Most were prisoners of Agra Central Jail, and they came to be known as "Dr Tyler's artisans". During the trip, he was requested by Queen Victoria to select two Indian servants to assist her at her Golden Jubilee celebrations. At the end of 1886 he was appointed to special duty in Dholpur and returned to London under the staff of the Maharaja of Bharatpur, taking his clerk Abdul Karim, with him. Karim had earlier chosen two gold bangles for Tyler to give to the Queen.

Karim noted in his memoirs of his first meeting with the Queen that "Dr Tyler and I were instructed to take our station near the dining room and wait her Majesty's coming." After presenting to her some gifts "the Queen was thereafter pleased to speak to Dr Tyler a few words, and so ended my first interview with the Empress of India." Two days later, the Queen sent Tyler a telegram requesting that both he and Karim return to Buckingham Palace. Karim, later known as "the Munshi", served the Queen for the last 14 years of her life.

== Later life ==
Tyler was knighted in 1888. Margaret Villiers, Countess of Jersey, recollected in her memoirs the time she stayed with Sir John Tyler, superintendent of the jail at Agra, and his "friend" Abdul Karim who was on leave from London. Tyler provided her family with carpets for their home at Osterley. In 1890 he was promoted to Inspector general of jails for the North-Western Provinces, and retired in 1896.

== Family ==
Tyler was married and had one son.

== Death and legacy ==
Tyler died in London at the age of 73 on 12 May 1913. His address at the time of his death was 32 Cambridge Street, Hyde Park Square. He left an estate of £257 with probate granted to Anne Newble, spinster. He was portrayed by actor Simon Paisley Day in the 2017 film Victoria & Abdul.

== See also ==
- Penal labour
