= Bathing Ghat, Bulandshahr =

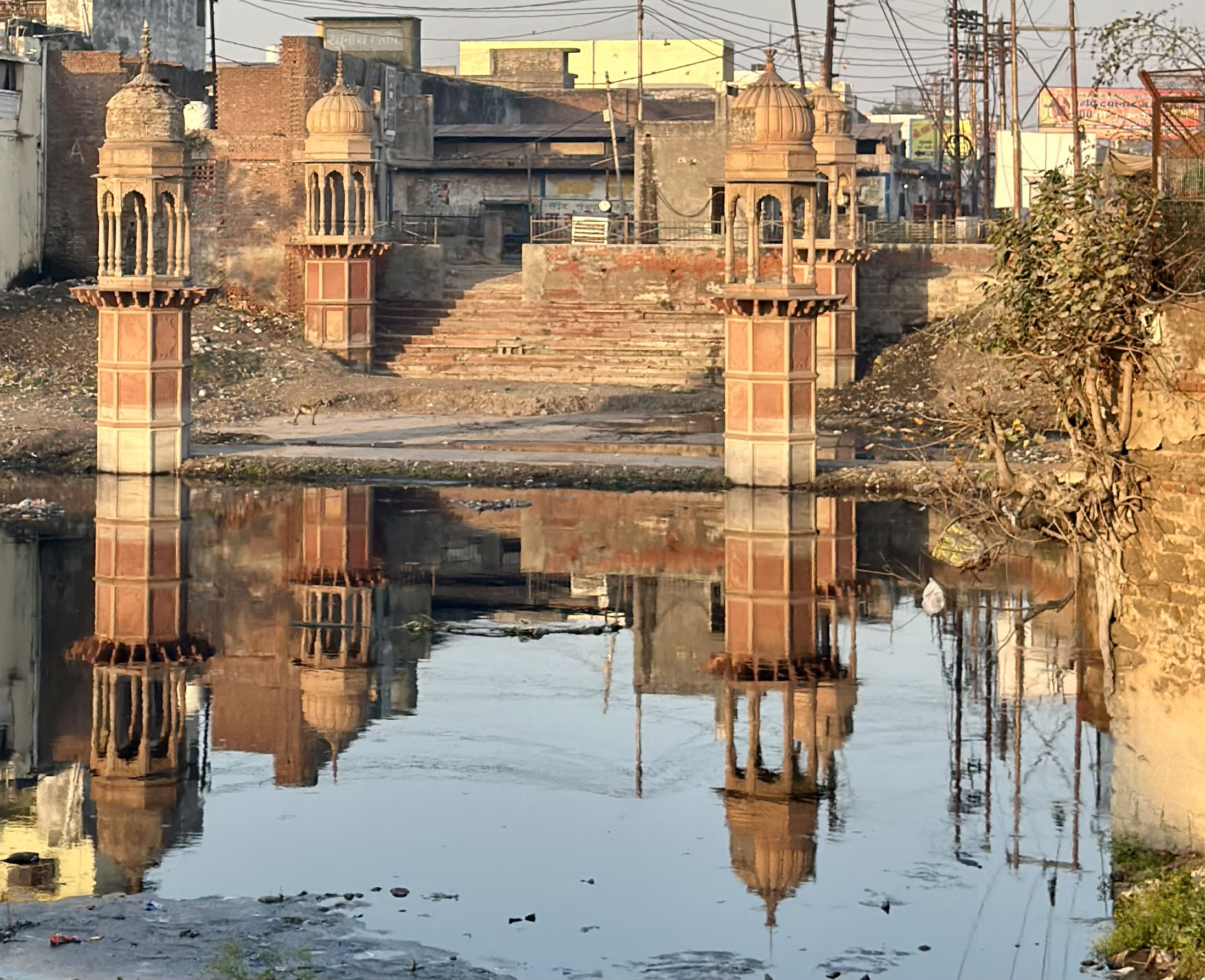
- Bulandshahr bathing ghat, 2023
- Interactive map of the Bathing Ghat, Bulandshahr area

General information
- Type: Ghat
- Location: Bulandshahr, India
- Coordinates: 28°24′31″N 77°51′45″E
- Groundbreaking: 1 November 1878
- Construction started: 1878
- Completed: 1880

Height
- Height: 52 ft (16 m)

The Bathing Ghat in Bulandshahr is a stone platform with steps positioned between four domed towers on the banks of the Kali River in Bulandshahr, India. Its foundation stone was laid in 1878 under the supervision of British district magistrate and collector for the Indian Civil Service, Frederick Growse. It was completed in 1880.

Within a few years of construction, it had become a site for local festivals and displays of fireworks, particularly at Holi.

== Origin ==
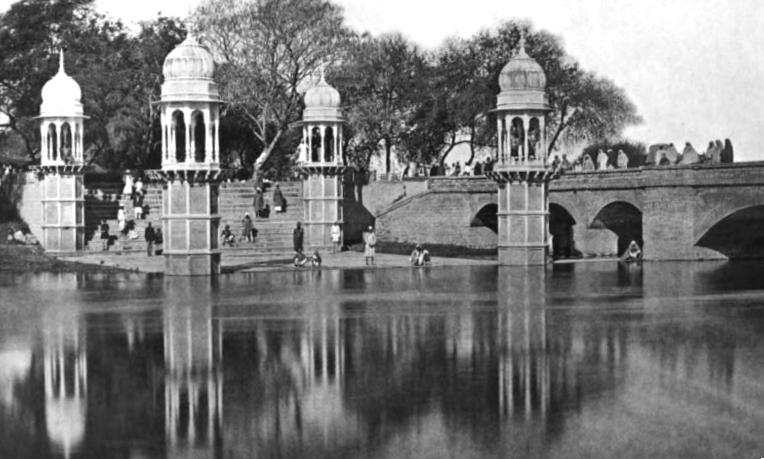
Bathing ghat Bulandshahr, 1880

The bathing ghat at Bulandshahr is a stone platform with steps positioned between four domed towers on the banks of the Kali River. Its foundation stone was laid on 1 November 1878 under the supervision of British district magistrate and collector for the Indian Civil Service, Frederick Growse. An executive engineer informed the British government in India that it would be an "eye-sore" and in visual obstruction of the bridge, resulting in a two-year delay in construction. Another similar ghat began construction further up the river, to be named after Kuar Lachman Singh.

== Structure ==
The towers are made from stone brick and each have eight sides, with red sandstone panels set in frames of white stone. Two panels display the names of those who made financial contributions to the building of the ghat; listed in order of amount donated. Opposite the ghat, further steps were built. The river serves as a boundary to the east of Bulandshahr, and the bridge receives the main roads entering the town, resulting in the towers forming a landmark site for approaching visitors. Each tower is topped with eaves and brackets over a plinth that provides support to a dome-topped open kiosk. The height of each tower is 52 ft (16 m); two are on land and two at the edge of the water.

== Cost ==
The total cost was ₹16,373 (equivalent to ₹5.5 million or US$58,000 in 2023), of which ₹3,670 (equivalent to ₹1.2 million or US$13,000 in 2023) was raised by the municipality; the rest was raised by the public. John Lockwood Kipling, Rudyard Kipling's father, noted that Growse had ensured it was locally financed, built in adherence to traditional Indian practices, and was "untouched by European training". The most expensive part of construction was creating the deep wells for the tower foundations.

An appendix in Growse's Bulandshahr; or, Sketches of an Indian district; social, historical and architectural (1884) displays the names of those that provided finances for the building of the ghat.

== Function ==
Within a few years of construction, it had become a site for local festivals and displays of fireworks, particularly at Holi.

== Gallery (2023) ==
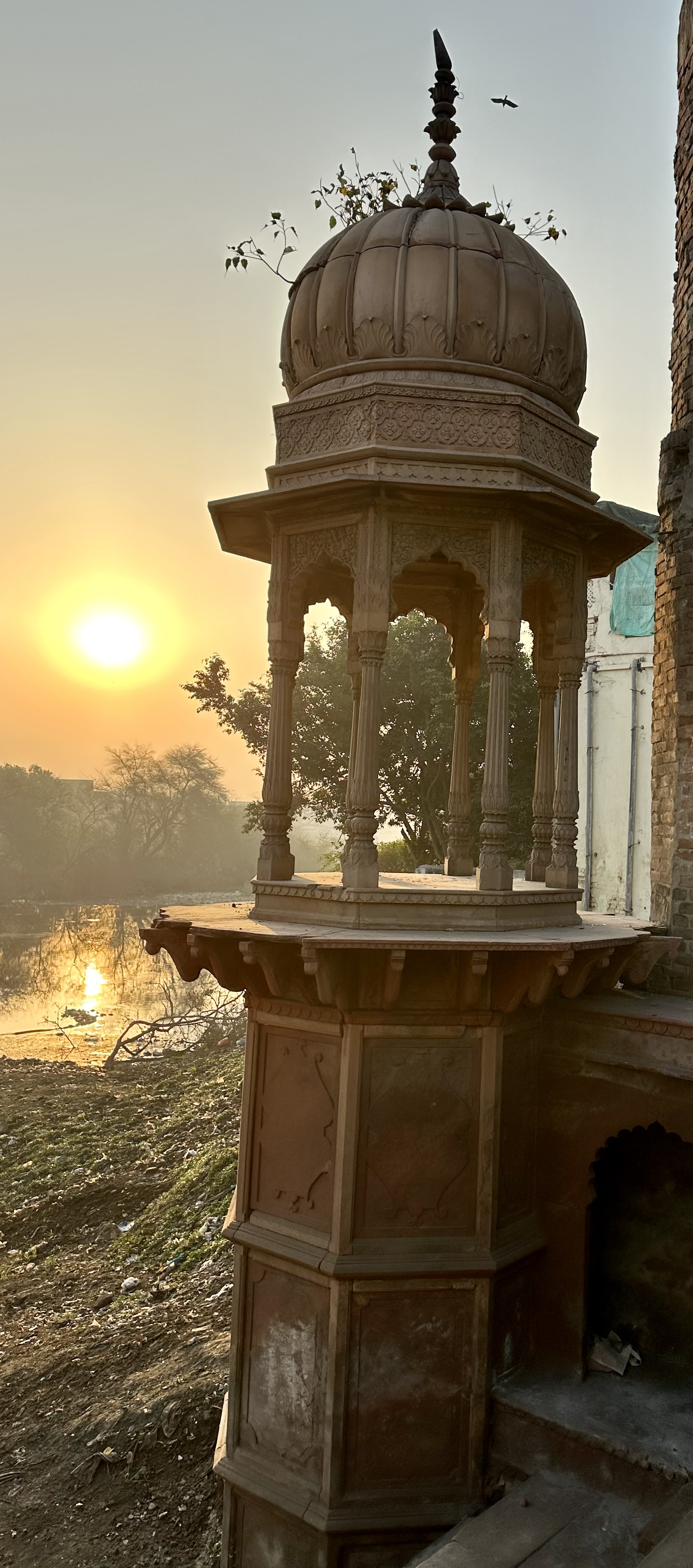

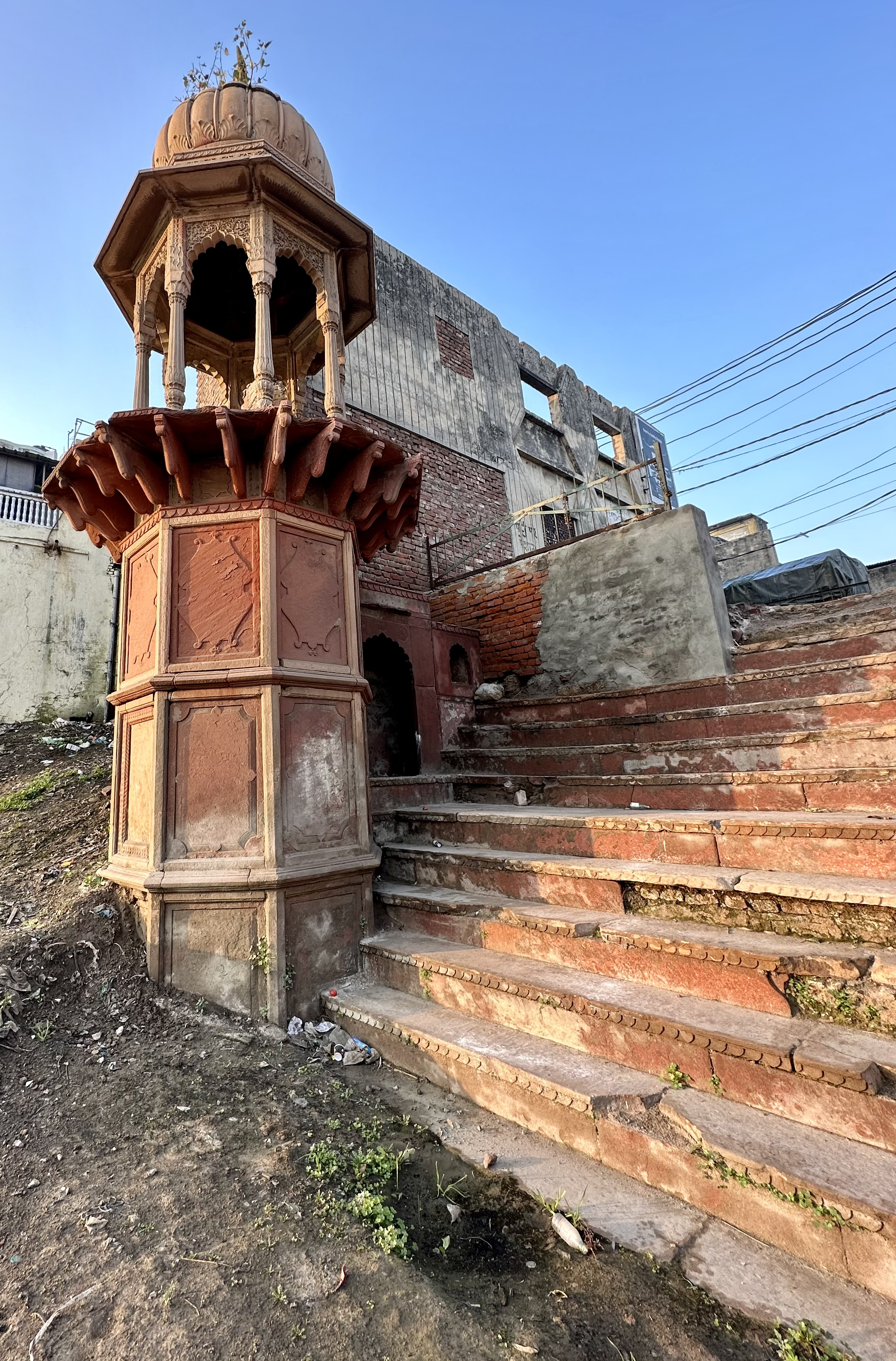

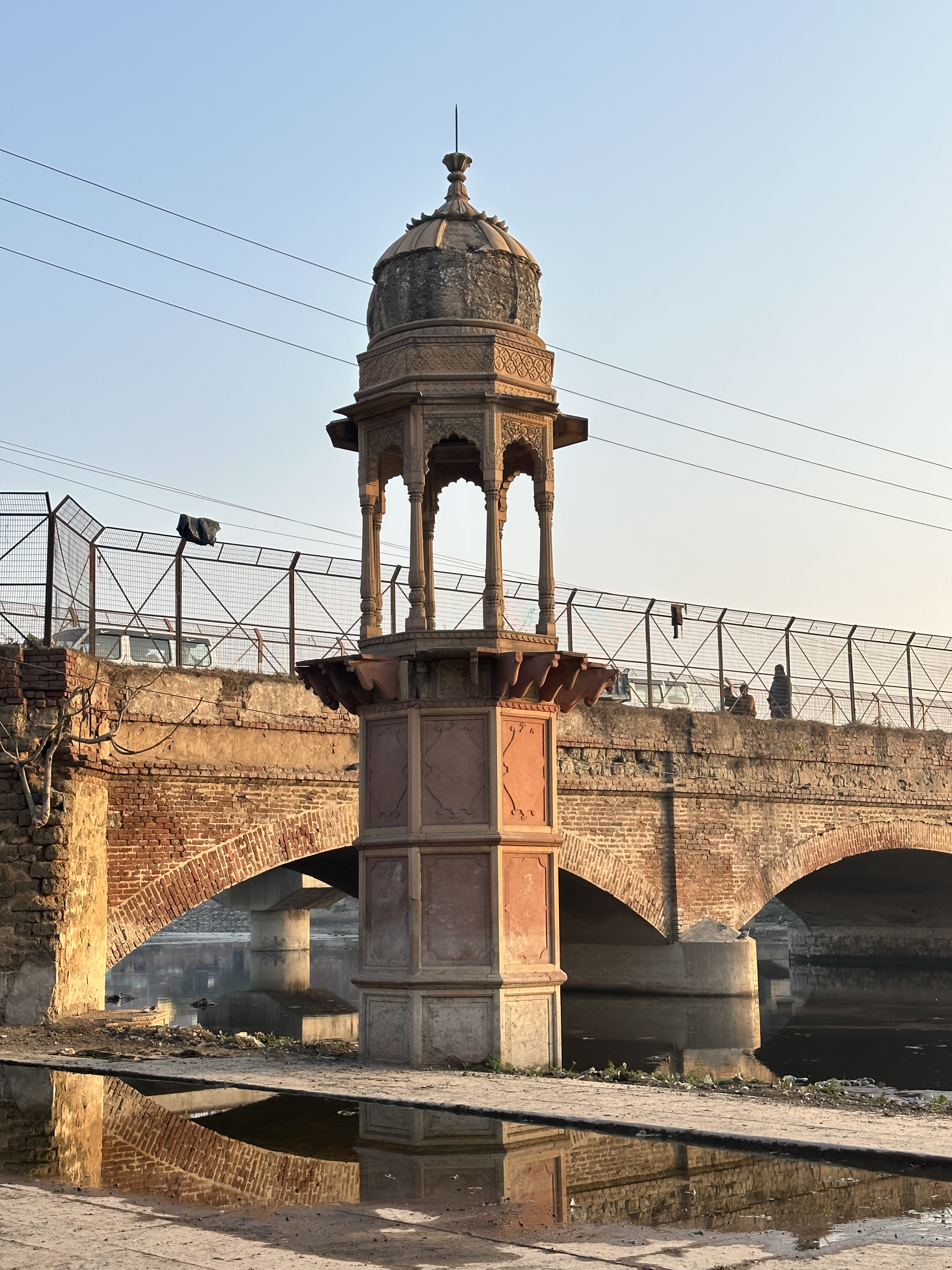

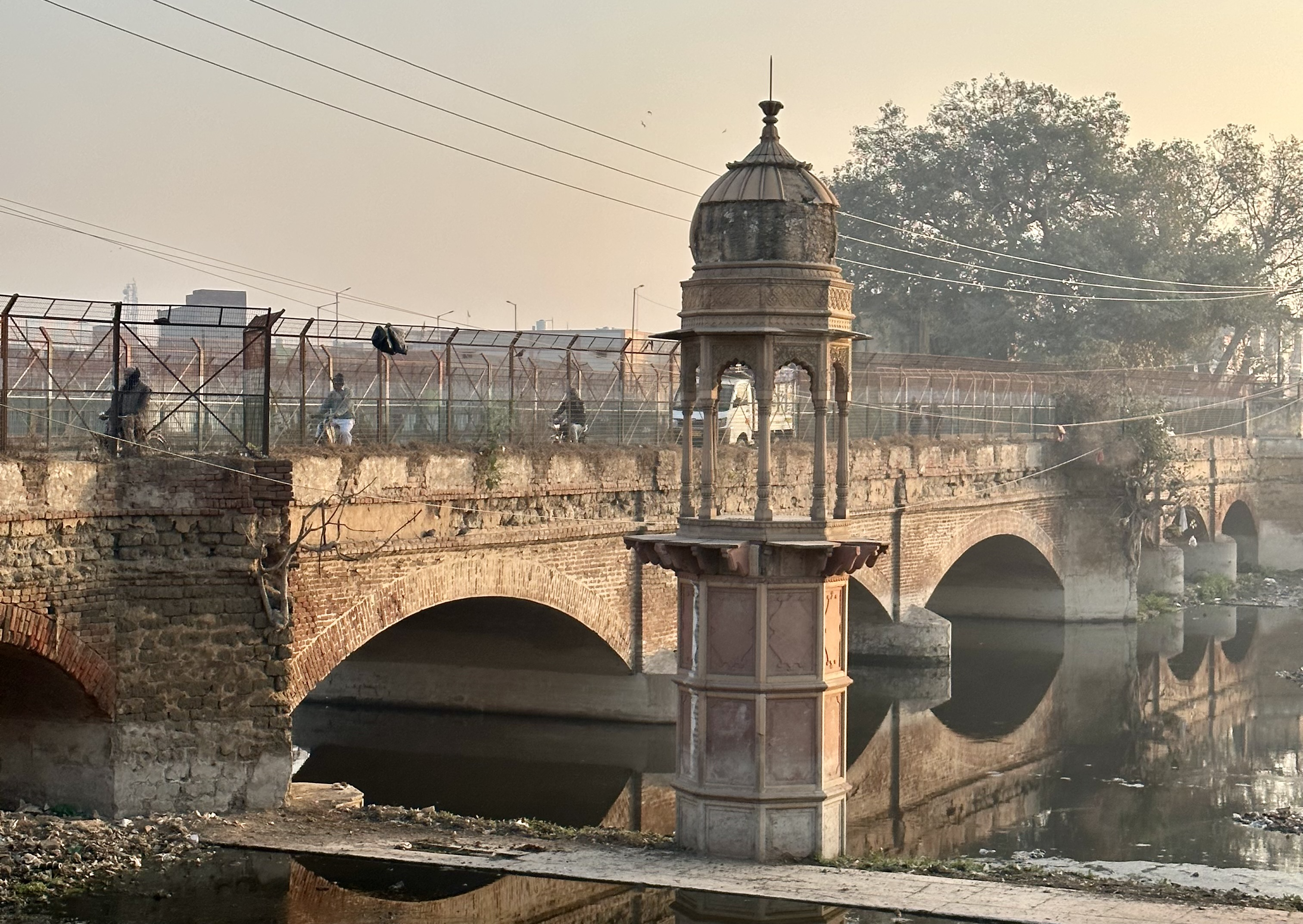

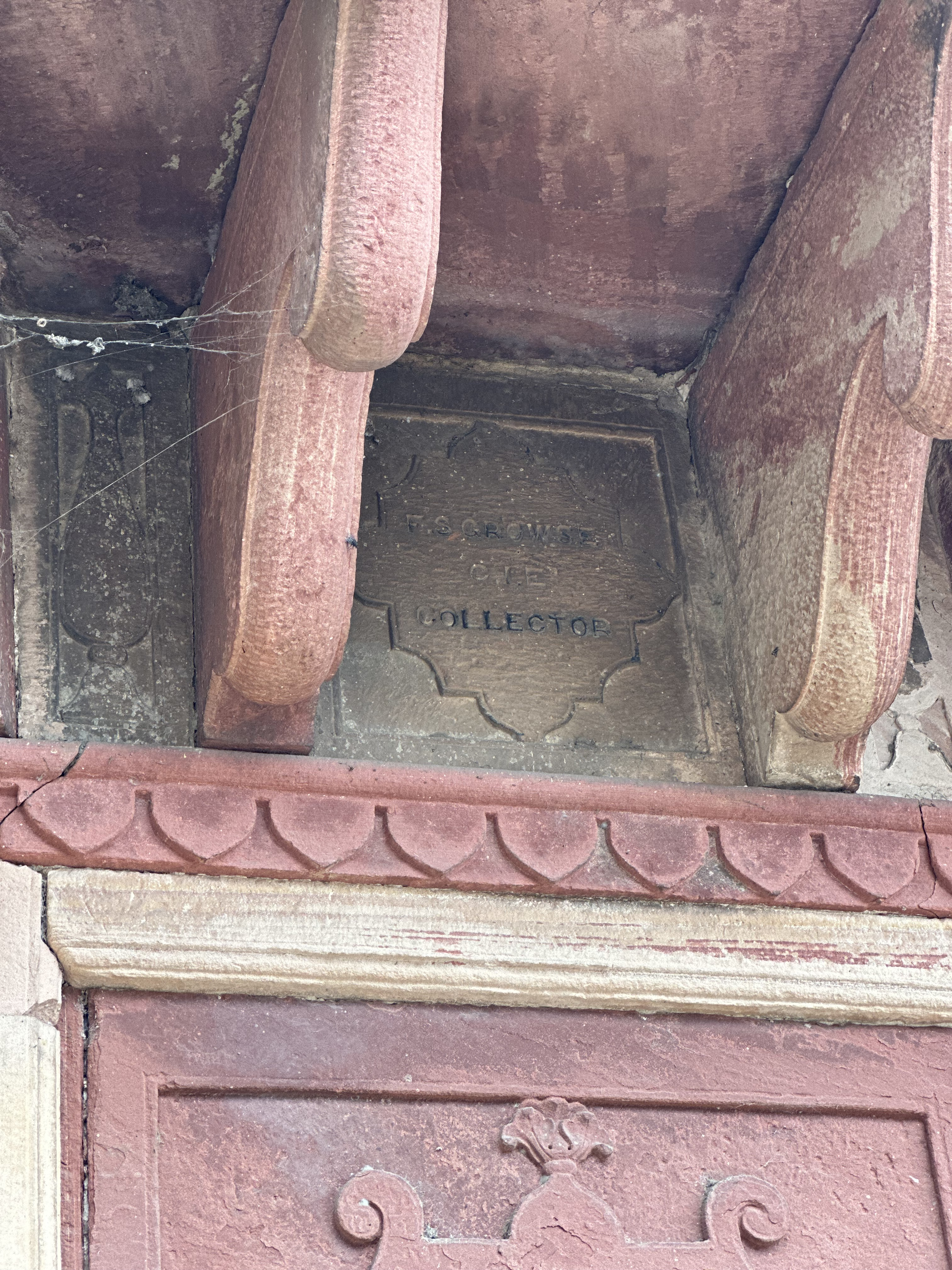
Inscription (Growse)
