= Bulandshahr: Or, Sketches of an Indian District =

1884 book by Frederic Growse

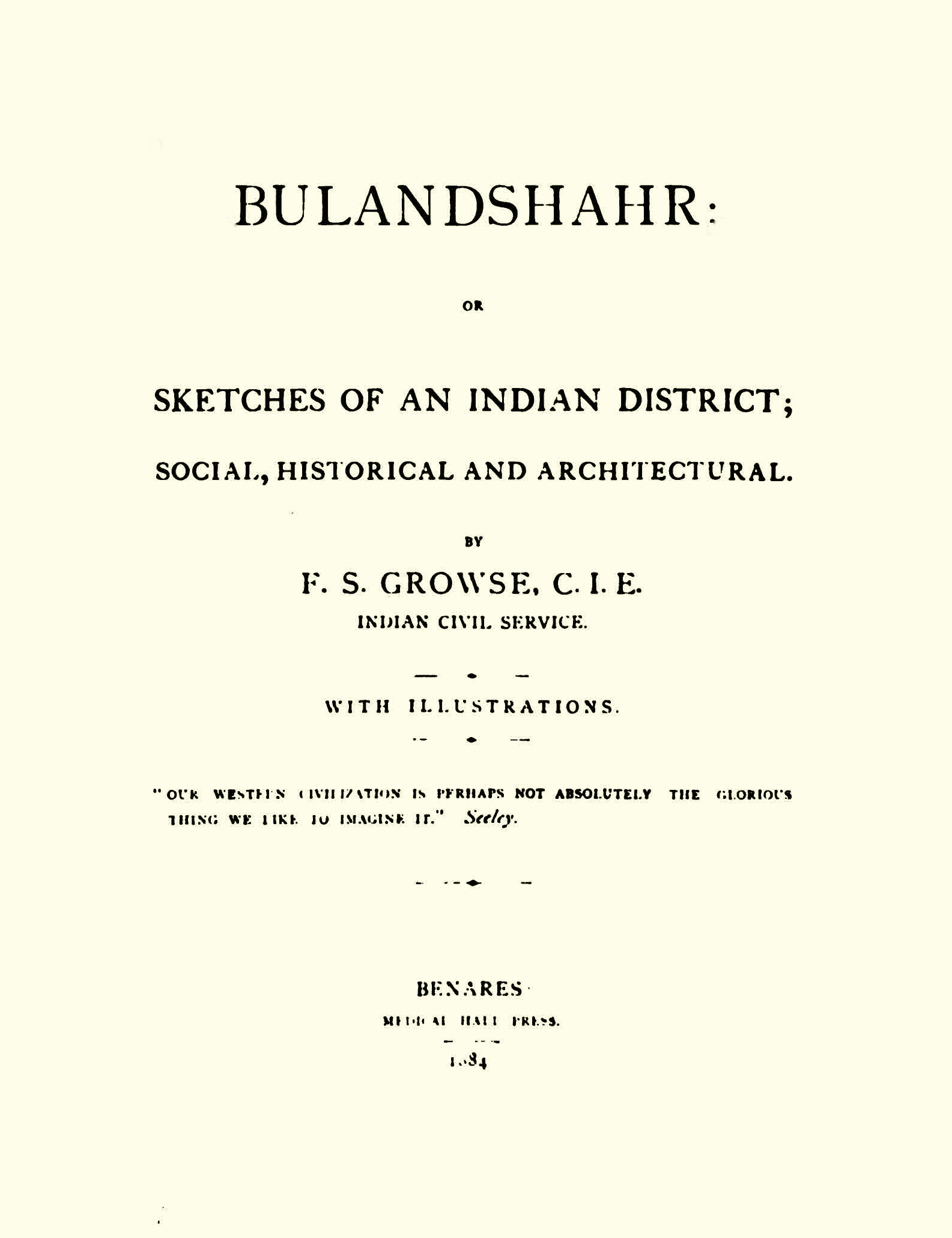
- Title page
- Author: Frederic Growse
- Language: English
- Published: Benares
- Publisher: Medical Hall Press
- Publication date: 1884
- Publication place: British India
- Pages: 90
- Followed by: Indian Architecture of Today as Exemplified in New Buildings in the Bulandshahr District: Part I

Bulandshahr: Or, Sketches of an Indian District: Social, Historical and Architectural is an 1884 book written by Frederic Growse, a district magistrate and collector for the Indian Civil Service, about the district of Bulandshahr in the North-Western Provinces during the British rule in India. It was published by Medical Hall Press, Benares, and includes a description of Bulandshahr, an account of its history from antiquity to the 1857 rebellion, and of how the town was rebuilt under the supervision of Growse himself in the late 19th century.

The account of the town built by local artisans brought Growse into dispute with the Public Works Department (PWD), who attempted to prevent the construction of his buildings. The British government in India's interpretation of the book was that it praised Indian architecture excessively and endorsed Indian autonomy. Growse was subsequently transferred from Bulandshahr and further publications banned. Later appraisals of his work note it as unique in architectural literature.

== Publication ==
Bulandshahr: Or, Sketches of an Indian District: Social, Historical and Architectural is a book about the district of Bulandshahr in India, and authored by British district magistrate and collector for the Indian Civil Service, Frederic Growse. It was published by Medical Hall Press of Benares in 1884 at a price of five rupees. Parts of it had been previously published in the Calcutta Review and in the Journal of the Asiatic Society of Bengal. The publication was followed by Growse's work titled Indian architecture of today as exemplified in new buildings in the Bulandshahr District (1885), in which he included press reviews of his 1884 book.

== Content ==
The book has 90 pages beginning with a preface by Growse dated 12 July 1884. The epigraph on the title page recites Seeley in capital letters: "Our western civilization is perhaps not absolutely the glorious thing we like to imagine it." (Note: From The Expansion of England by Seeley (1883).) On the following page, also in all capital letters is a quote from Lord Beaconsfield: "The local sentiment in man is the strongest passion in his nature, it is the parent of most of our virtues." (Note: Speech at Salthill, 1864)

Following a contents page and a page listing the eight illustrations in the book, there are three main parts; a description of Bulandshahr district titled "Bulandshahr, the district its characteristics and its capabilities", an account of its history from antiquity to the 1857 rebellion titled "History of the town of Bulandshahr District from its foundation to the mutiny of 1857 A. D.", and of how the town of Bulandshahr was rebuilt under the supervision of Growse himself titled "The rebuilding of Bulandshahr".

The appendices display the names of those that provided finances for the building of the Bathing Ghat, and the Lyall tank named for Alfred Comyn Lyall. This is followed by press notices on Growse's publications of the English translation of the Ramayana of Tulsidas, and his Mathurá: A district memoir (1880).

=== Illustrations ===
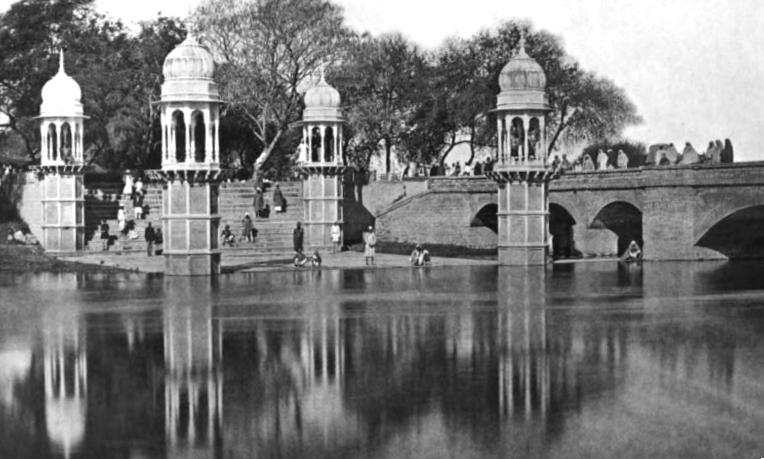
Image in book: Bathing ghat at Kali Nadi (1880)

Images in the book include a photograph of the Bathing Ghat. Other building descriptions include the Garden Gate and Town Hall. Growse states that an executive engineer informed the British government in India in 1878 that the bathing ghat would be an "eye-sore" that obscured the view of the bridge, resulting in a two-year delay of construction.

== Reception ==
The account of the town built by local artisans brought Growse into dispute with the governmental Public Works Department (PWD), who condemned the construction of his buildings and attempted to prevent them. (Note: Concerns of whether design should be based on traditional Indian or British styles were part of a wider debate on architecture at the time.) The British government in India's interpretation of the book was that it praised native architecture and endorsed Indian autonomy. The book annoyed the government so much that they only allowed one edition, banned further prints and punished Growse by transferring him to the remote town of Fatepur, out of Bulandshahr District. (Note: This was not a surprise; his earlier demotion to Bulandshahr from Mathura resulted from a similar dispute with the PWD over his building of the Sacred Heart Catholic Church.)

The book was seen by the press to demonstrate Growse's feelings towards the local people. He was generally seen as sympathetic towards Indians, rich or poor. (Note: Thomas R. Metcalf in An Imperial Vision: Indian architecture and Britain's Raj noted that the local Indian elite initially showed support for Growse and made donations to build structures such as the Bathing Ghat and the Lyall Tank, but after realizing that Growse was not in favour by his superiors, they were not so keen to contribute further.) A review in The Indian Antiquary (1885) felt the book's part in the rebuilding of the town of particular interest and praised Growse's work, but felt he went too far in assuming that left to their own devices, "natives" would merely copy European buildings. The Saturday Review of Politics, Literature, Science, and Art described the first two chapters on the description and history of Bulandshahr as "fairly instructive and accurate", but lacked information on "statistics of crime, or cattle-stealers, or notices of fauna and flora". The Indian Statesman called the work "painstaking research into the history and present condition of an Indian district and honest endeavour to utilise as far as possible its indigenous resources for the benefit of the inhabitants". Growse's obituary in the journal of the Royal Asiatic Society of Great Britain and Ireland described the work as "chiefly interesting as showing how he was able to transfer his sympathies from a Hindu to a Musulman population, when the requirements of a bureaucratic regime compelled his removal".

The impact of the book was largely seen only after Growse's return to England. Professor of architecture Miki Desai described the book as a "unique example" of architectural literature, with Growse allowing and fostering "the local craftsmanship with little intervention and created Indian imagery of British 'patronage'". Ulrike Stark, professor and scholar of Hindi literature, has pointed out the book's epigraph, which she says captures "his [Growse's] admiration of Indian civilization".
