= Town Hall, Bulandshahr =

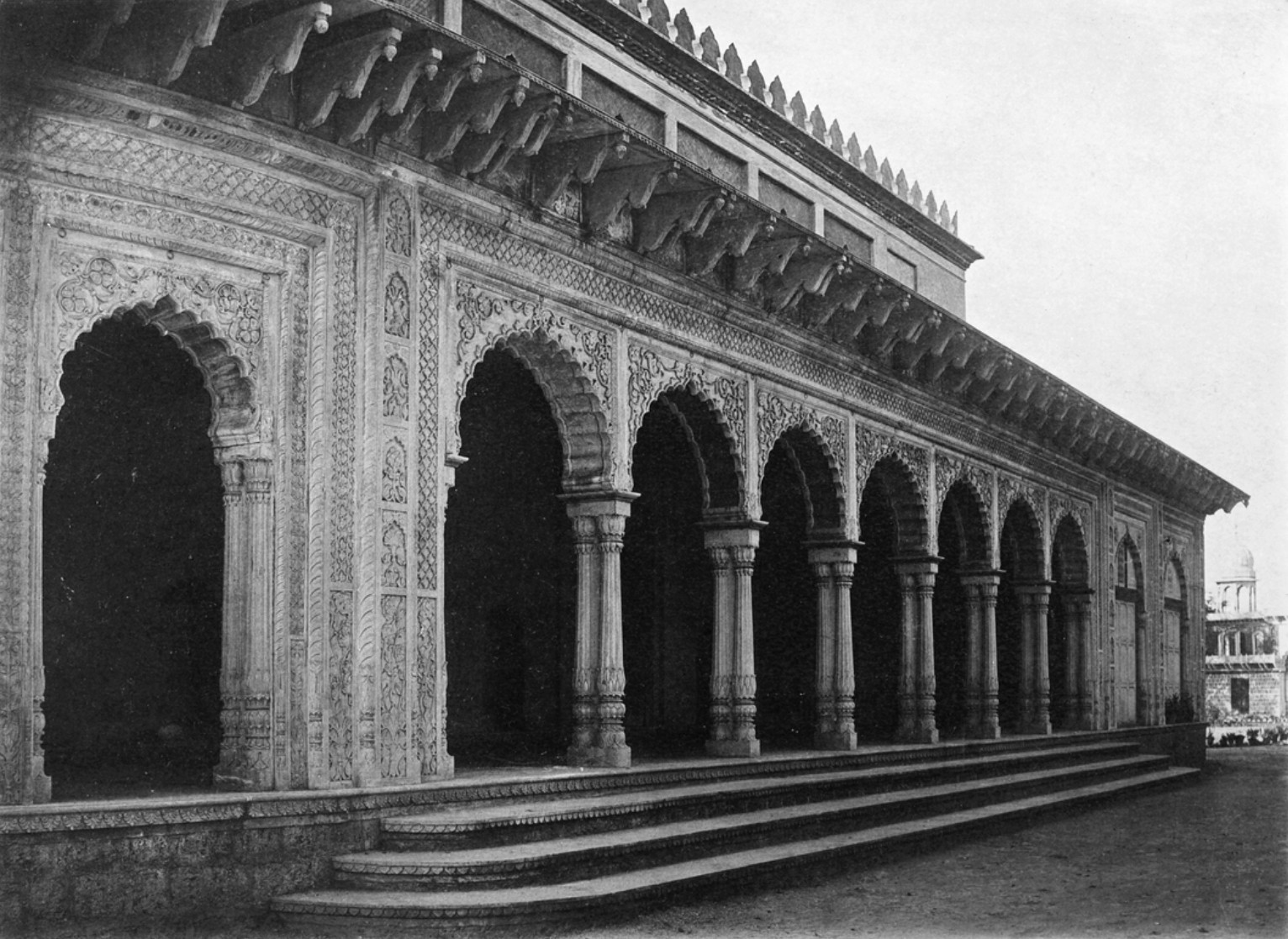
- Town Hall Bulandshahr (19th century)

General information
- Architectural style: Indo-Saracenic architecture

The Town Hall in Bulandshahr, India, was built by Muhammad Baquar Ali Khan at a cost of Rs. 30,000 in the late 19th century. The project was overseen by Frederic Growse, a British civil servant of the Indian Civil Service, who had been appointed collector of the region in 1878. It is situated in Moti Bagh, which was created as a public garden. The main approach was via the Garden Gate. It was built in 1883.

== Entrance (west) ==
The main approach was via the Garden Gate.

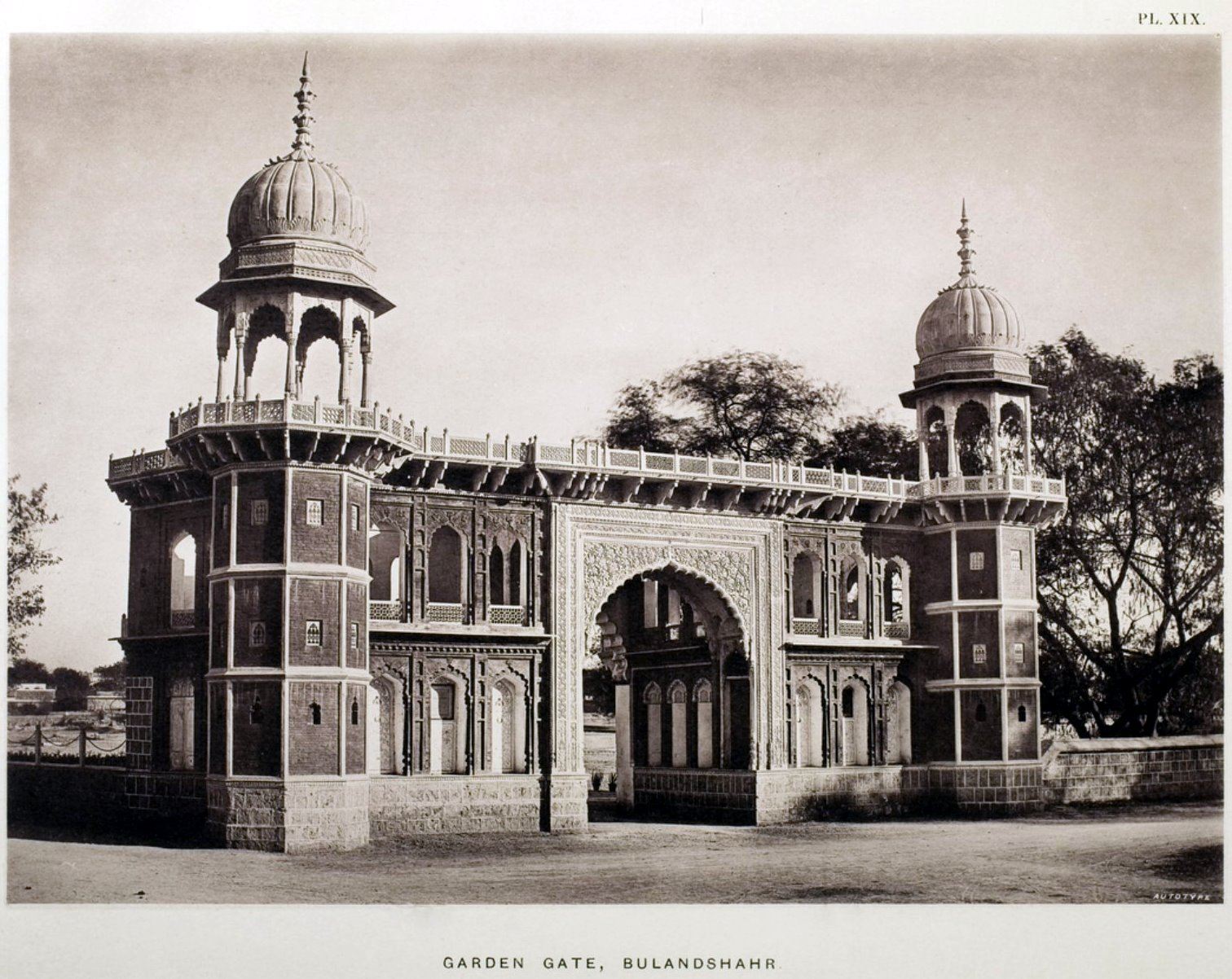
Garden Gate, Bulandshahr (1880s)

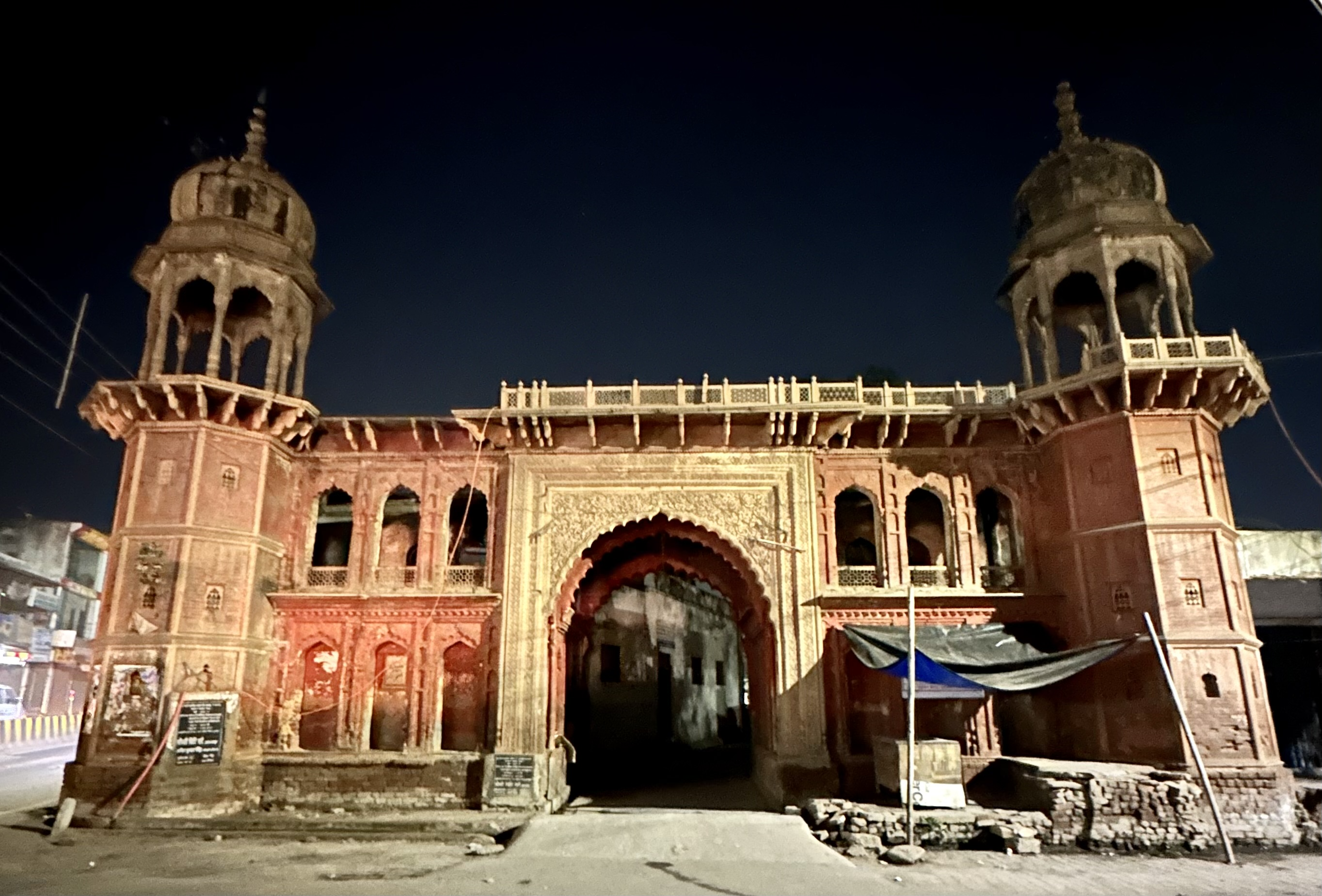
Garden Gate, Bulandshahr (2023)

== 2023 ==
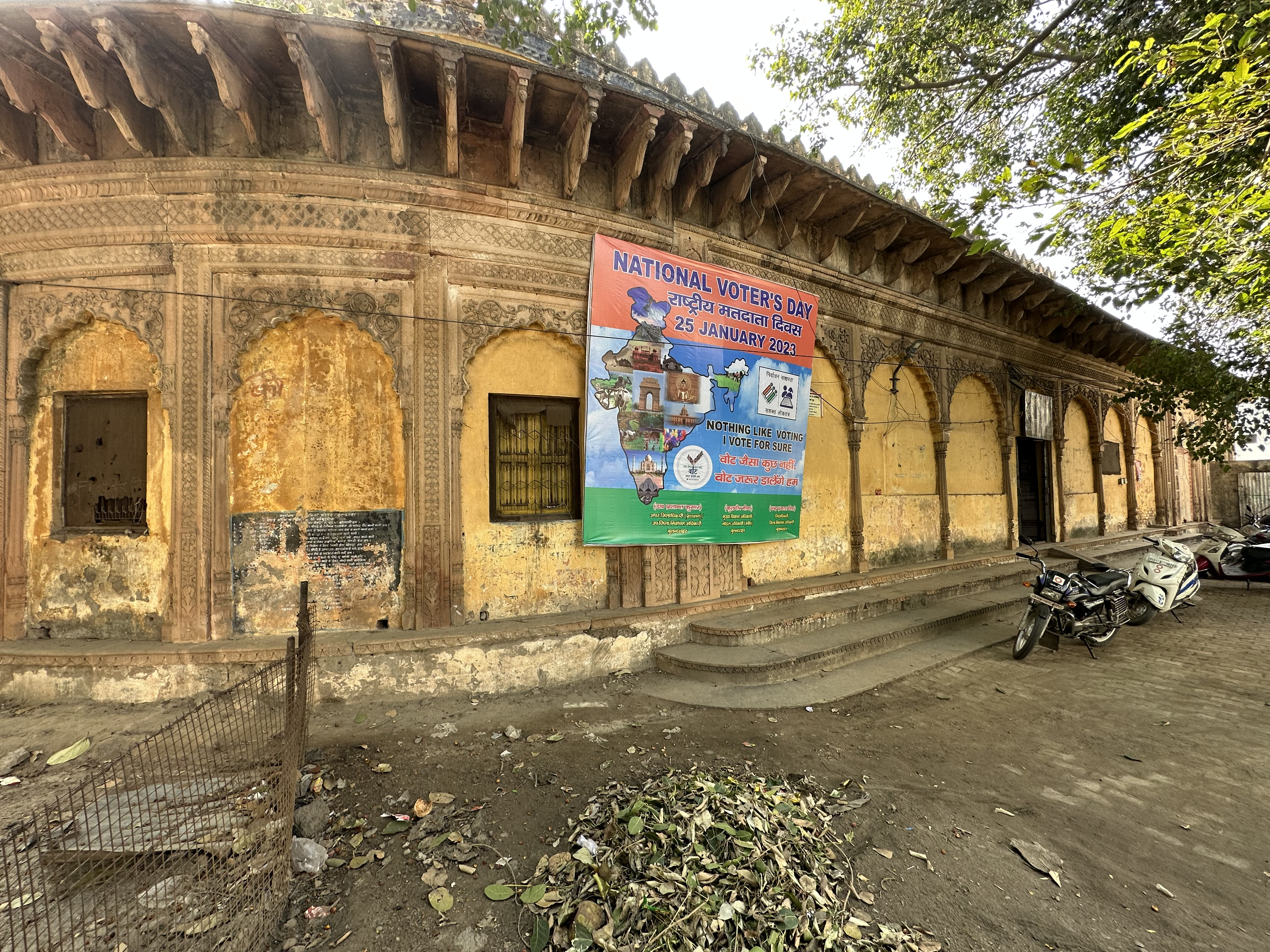
Town Hall North Verandah (2023)

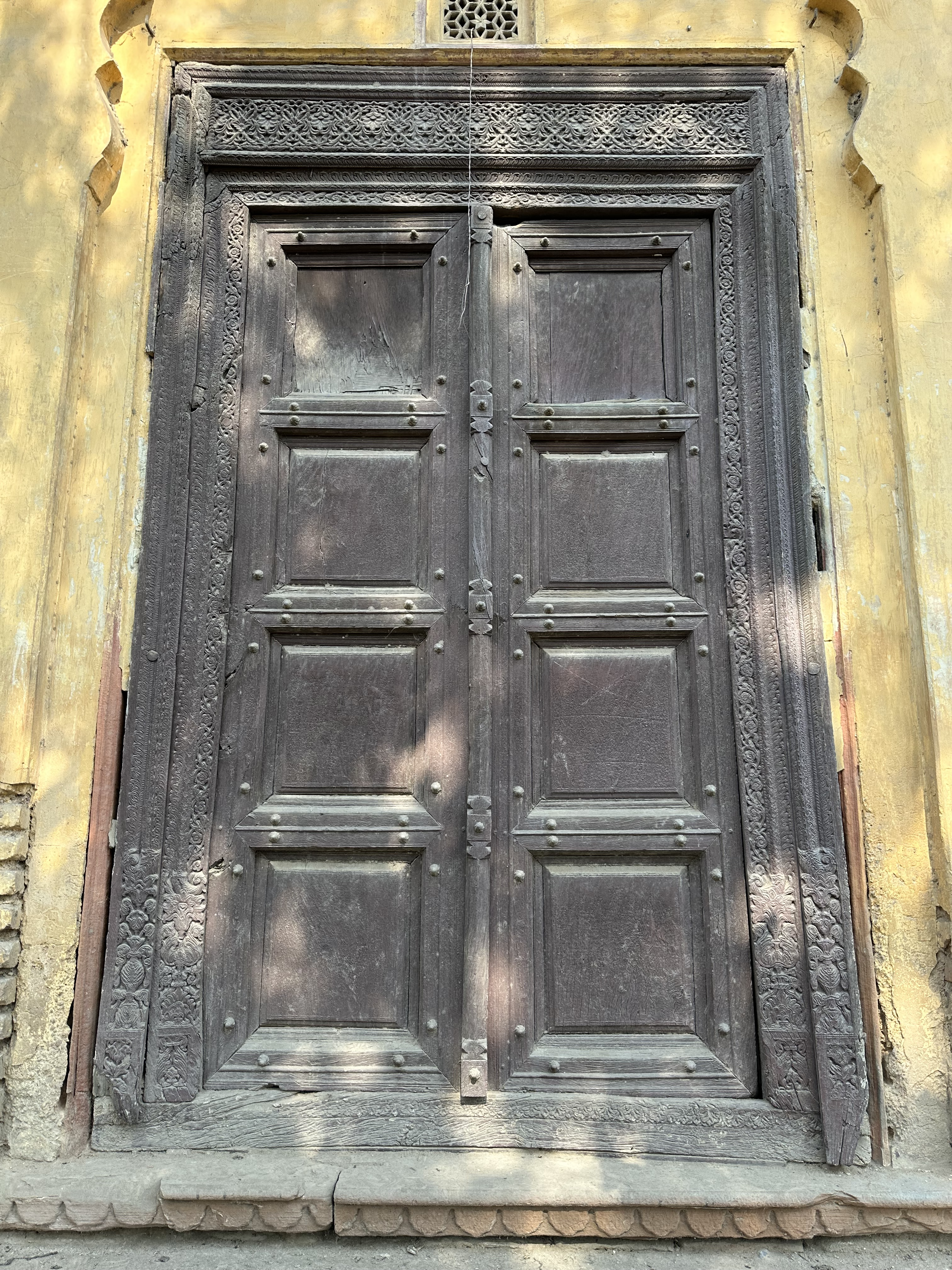
Wooden door

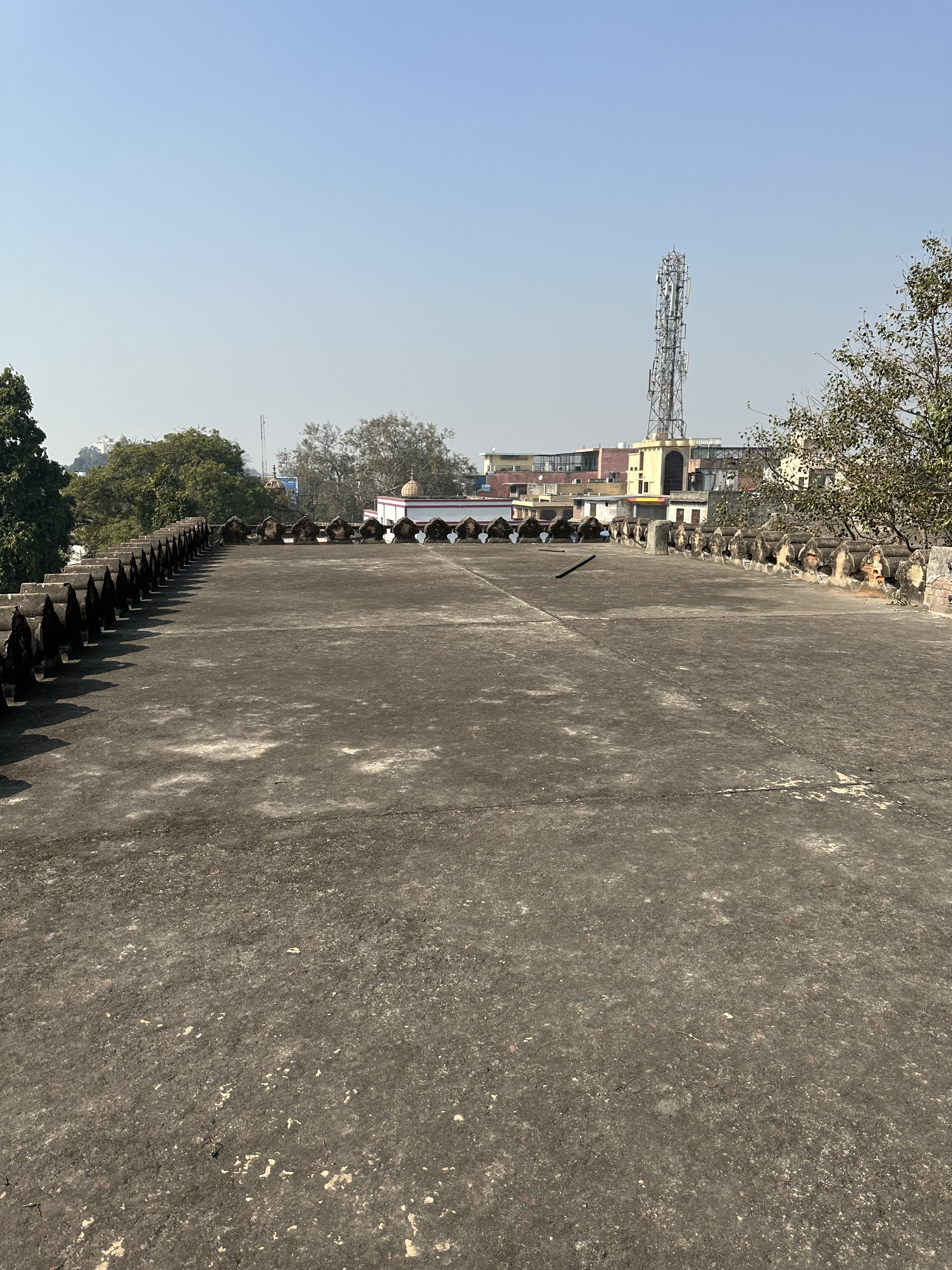
Roof terrace

== See also ==
- Bulandshahr; or, Sketches of an Indian district; social, historical and architectural (1884)
