= Sacred Heart Catholic Church, Mathura =

Church in Mathura, Uttar Pradesh, India

Sacred Heart Catholic Church
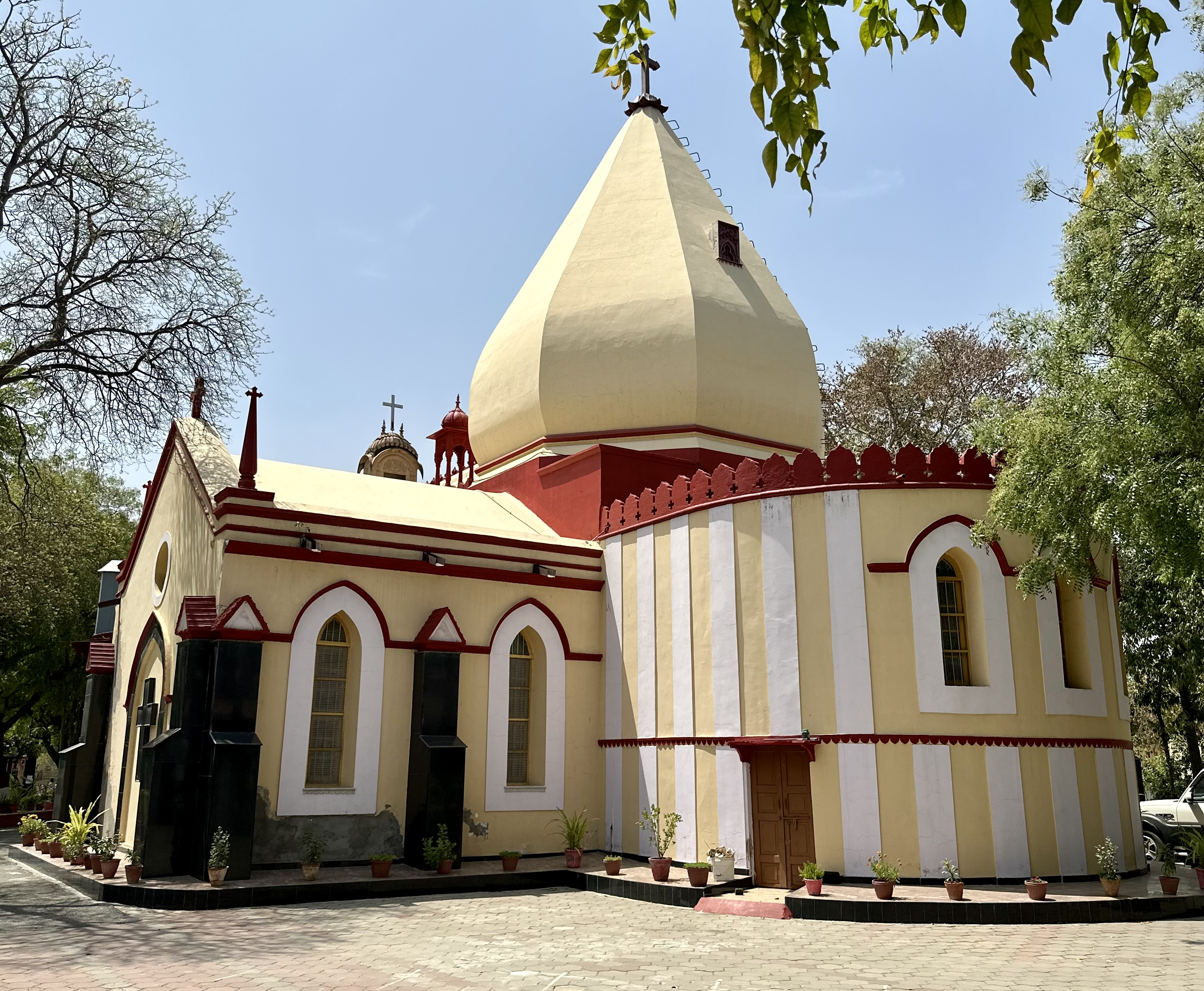
- Sacred Heart Catholic Church (2023)
- Sacred Heart Catholic Church
- 27°29′03.7″N 77°41′40.3″E
- Location: Mathura
- Country: India
- Denomination: Roman Catholic

History
- Founded: 1874
- Founder: Frederic Growse

Architecture
- Years built: 1870s

Administration
- Archdiocese: Archdiocese of Agra

The Sacred Heart Catholic Church is an architecturally notable church in Mathura, Uttar Pradesh, India. The design combines Gothic principles, Indian craftsmanship, and a Russian dome.

The church was built in the 1870s by Frederic Growse, a British civil servant, and convert to Catholicism, on the site of a shed which had previously been used as a Catholic chapel. Growse paid a third of the cost, with donations also being received from the bankers Seth Lachhman Das and Seth Lakhmi Chand, and others. The Persian carpet covering the steps of the altar was given by Agra's superintendent of the central prison John W. Tyler, and the Stations of the Cross came from the 10th Royal Hussars. Examples of local art are seen in the carvings on its doorways, window traceries and the kiosks by the dome. Growse intended it for a mixed congregation of Europeans and Indians.

== Origins ==
The first stone was laid on 18 January 1874, on the site of a shed which had been used as a Catholic chapel dedicated to St Francis Apostle of the Poor. Mathura already had an Anglican church, built in the Italianate style, for the use of British troops stationed there. Frederic Growse, a British civil service officer posted to Mathura in the 1870s who had converted to Catholicism, was an enthusiast for Indian arts and crafts, and set out to plan a Catholic church in that style.

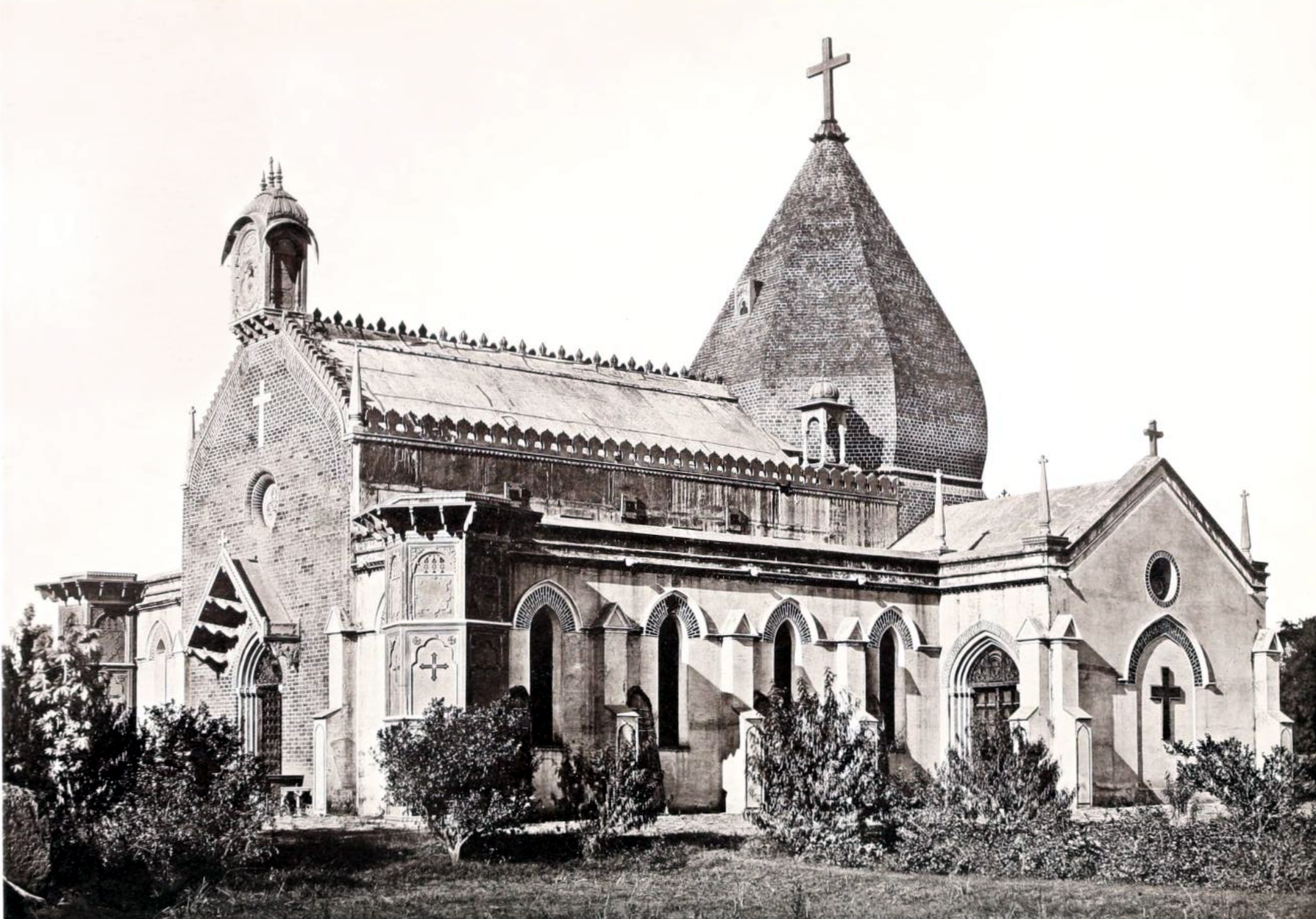
Sacred Heart Catholic Church at the time of its construction

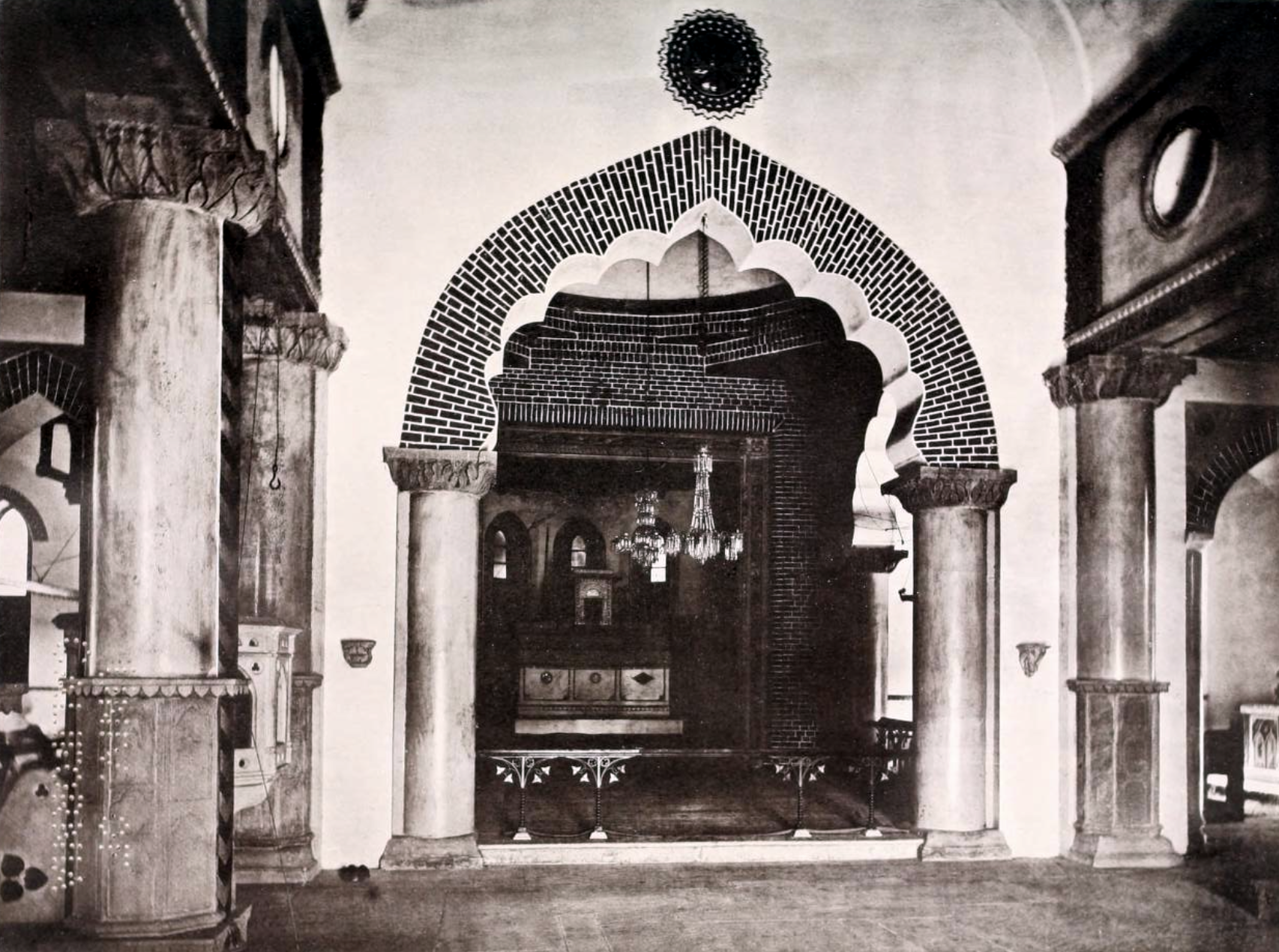
Interior view (19th century)

== Design and construction ==
The church's grounds and general proportions were planned according to Gothic principles, while the rest of the church is "purely oriental in design". He employed local craftsmen. Examples of local art are seen in the carvings on its doorways, the window traceries and the kiosks by the dome. Growse initially proposed to design the dome based on the spire of the Hindu temple Madan Mohan, at Brindaban, but fearing opposition, changed his plan and designed it in the Russian style instead. After the Indian Rebellion of 1857, attempts to introduce Indo-Saracenic architecture was seen by the British in India as controversial.

Growse regarded the church as unfinished, due to his forced removal from his post at Mathura to serve in another district.

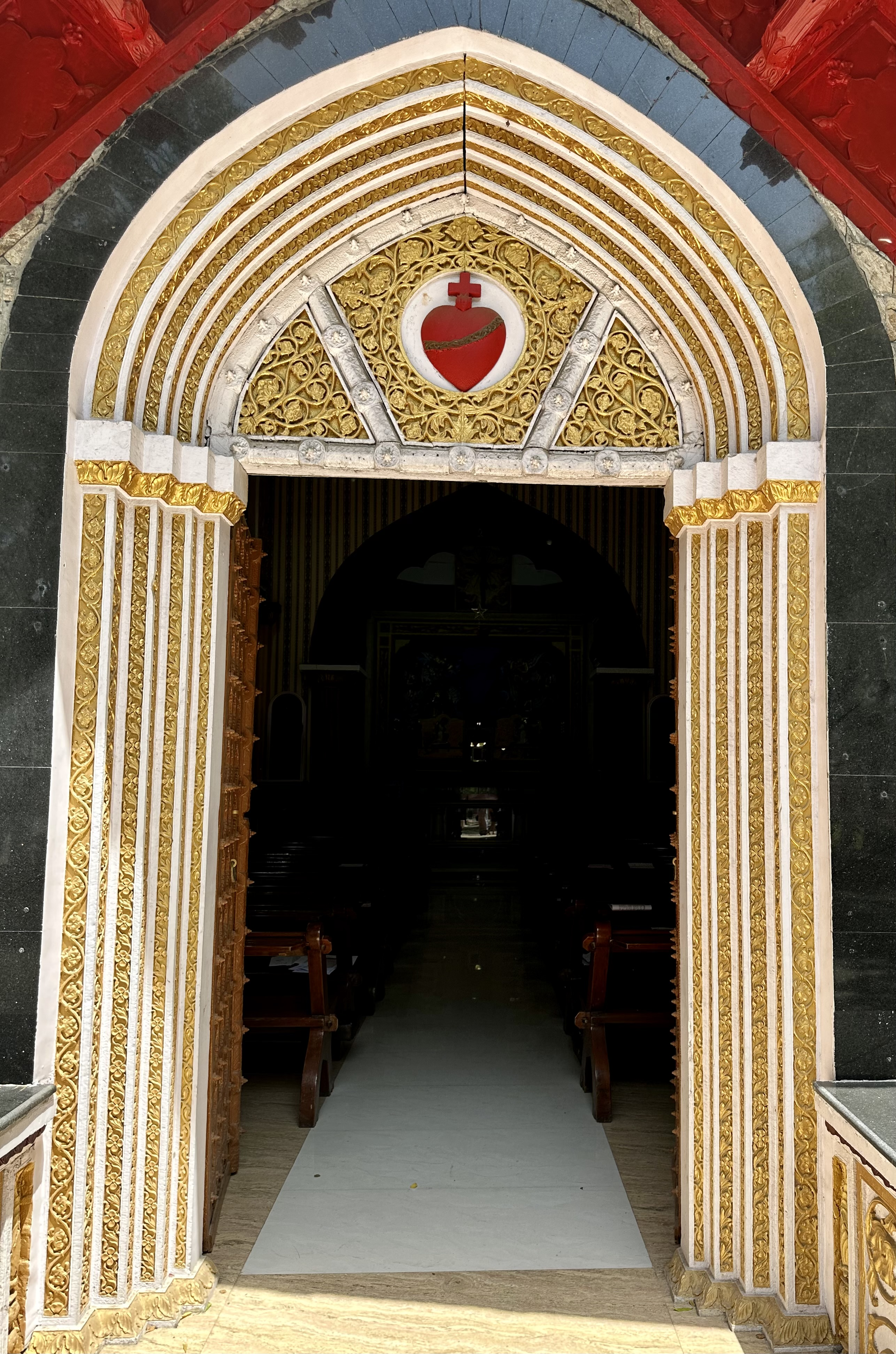
Entrance

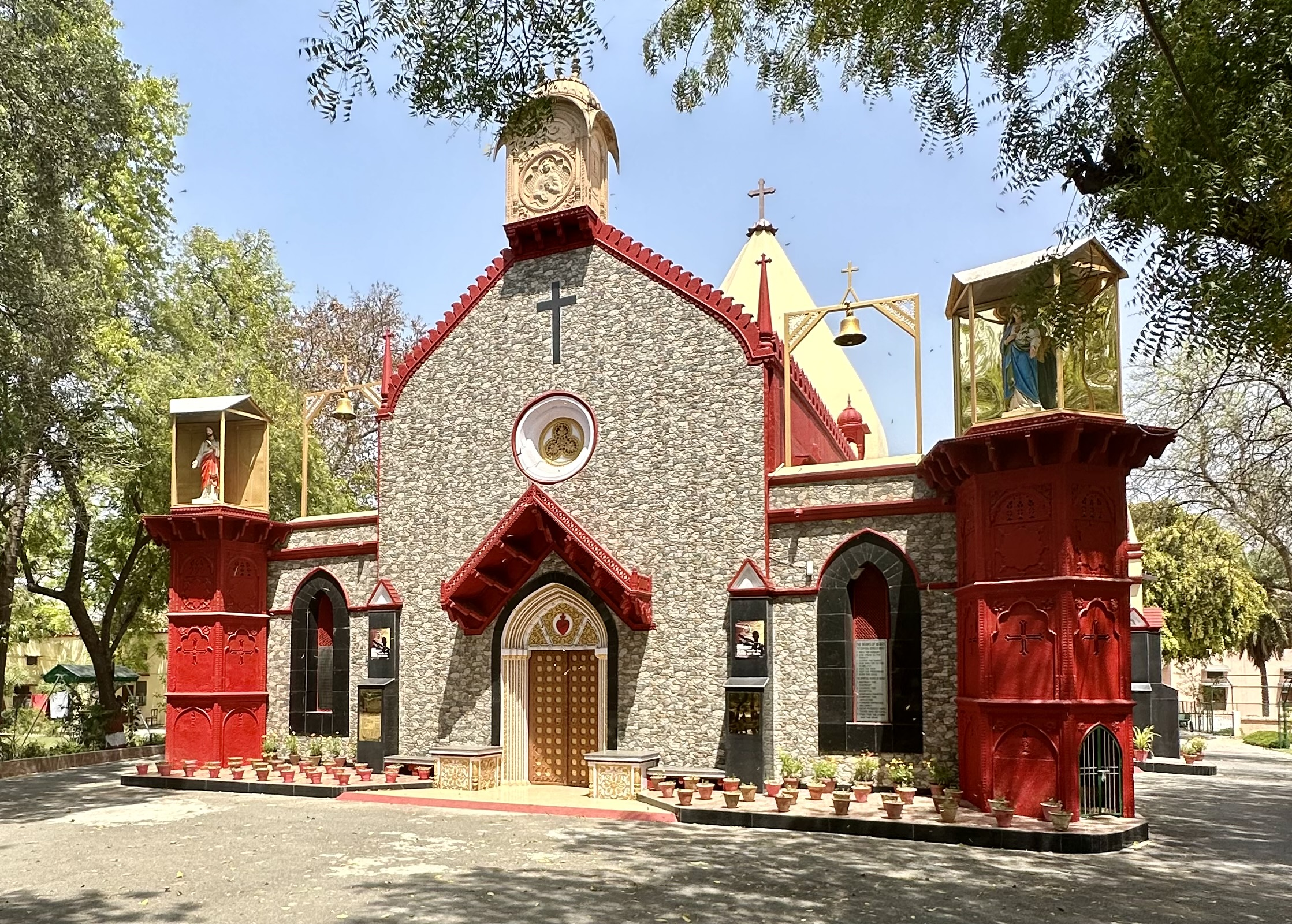
Exterior

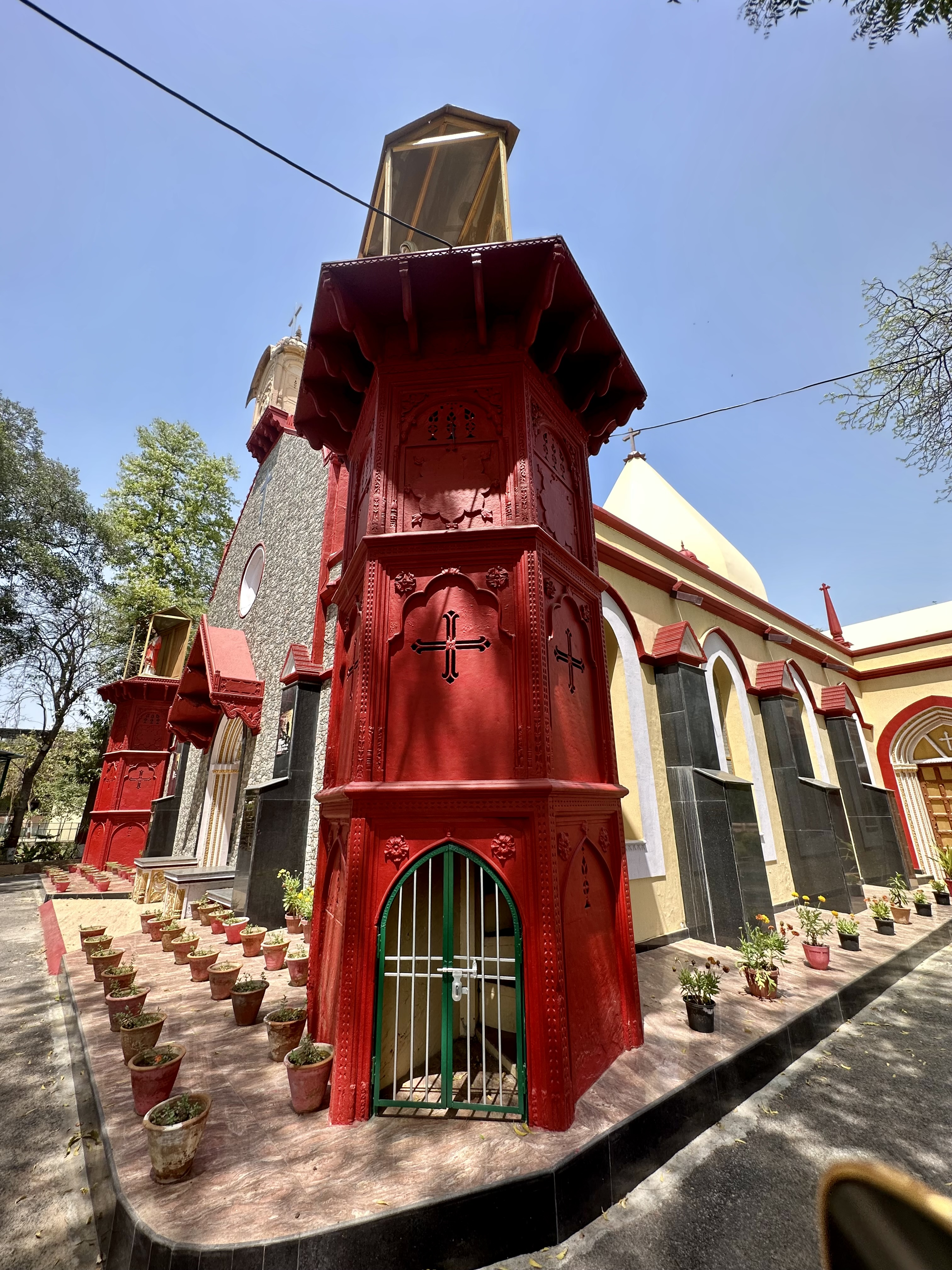
Unfinished pillar

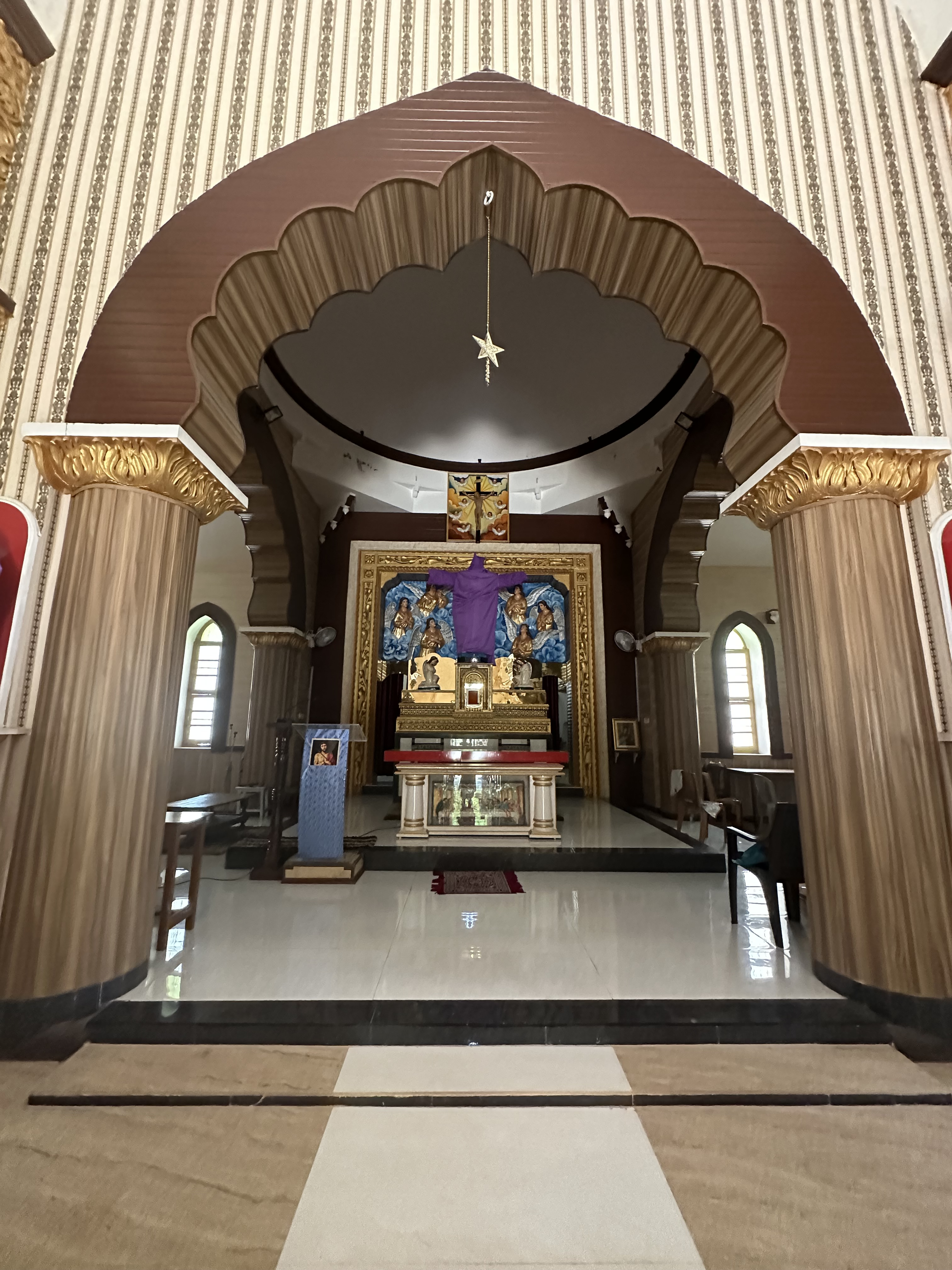
Interior (Good Friday)

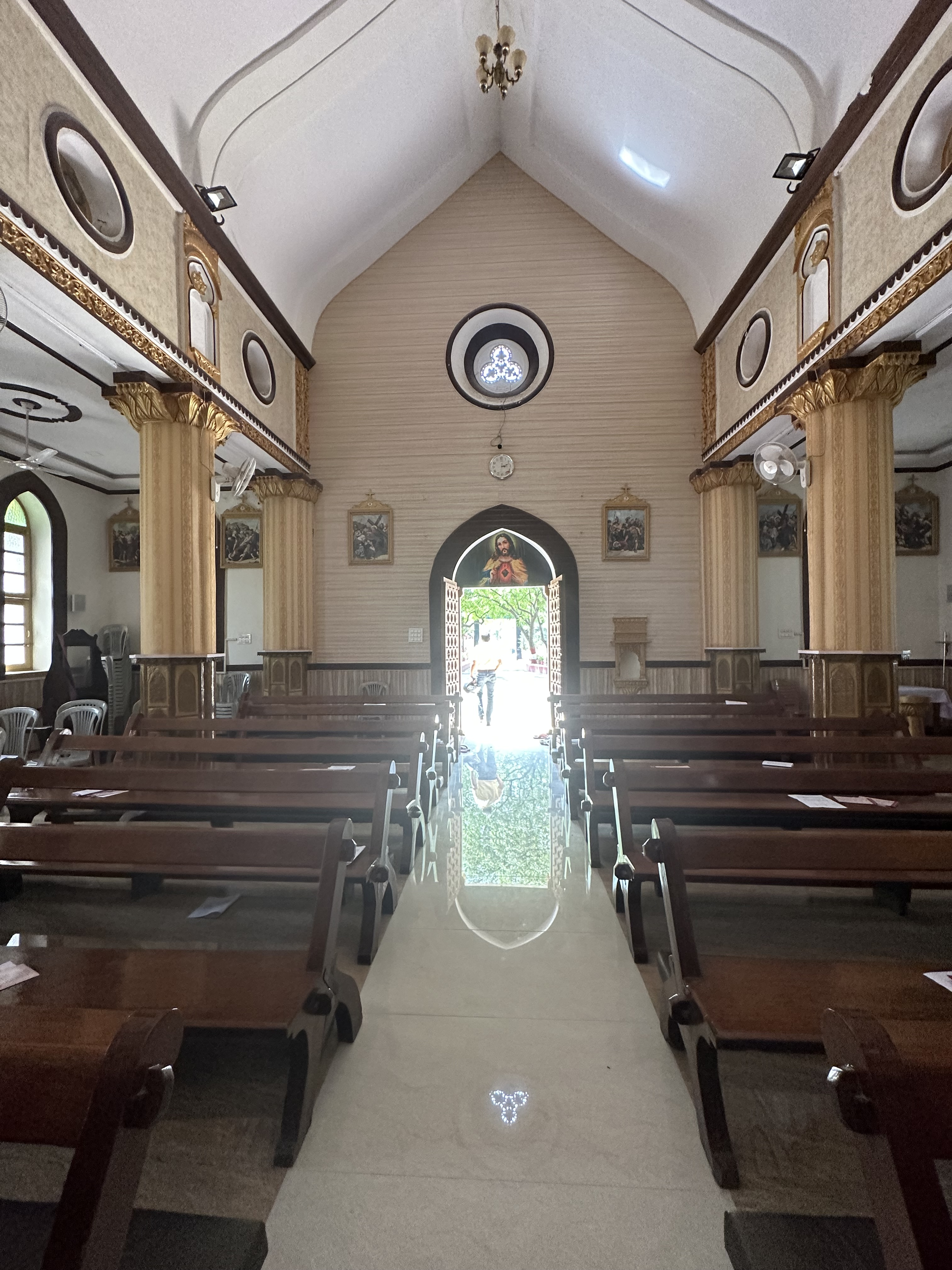
Interior

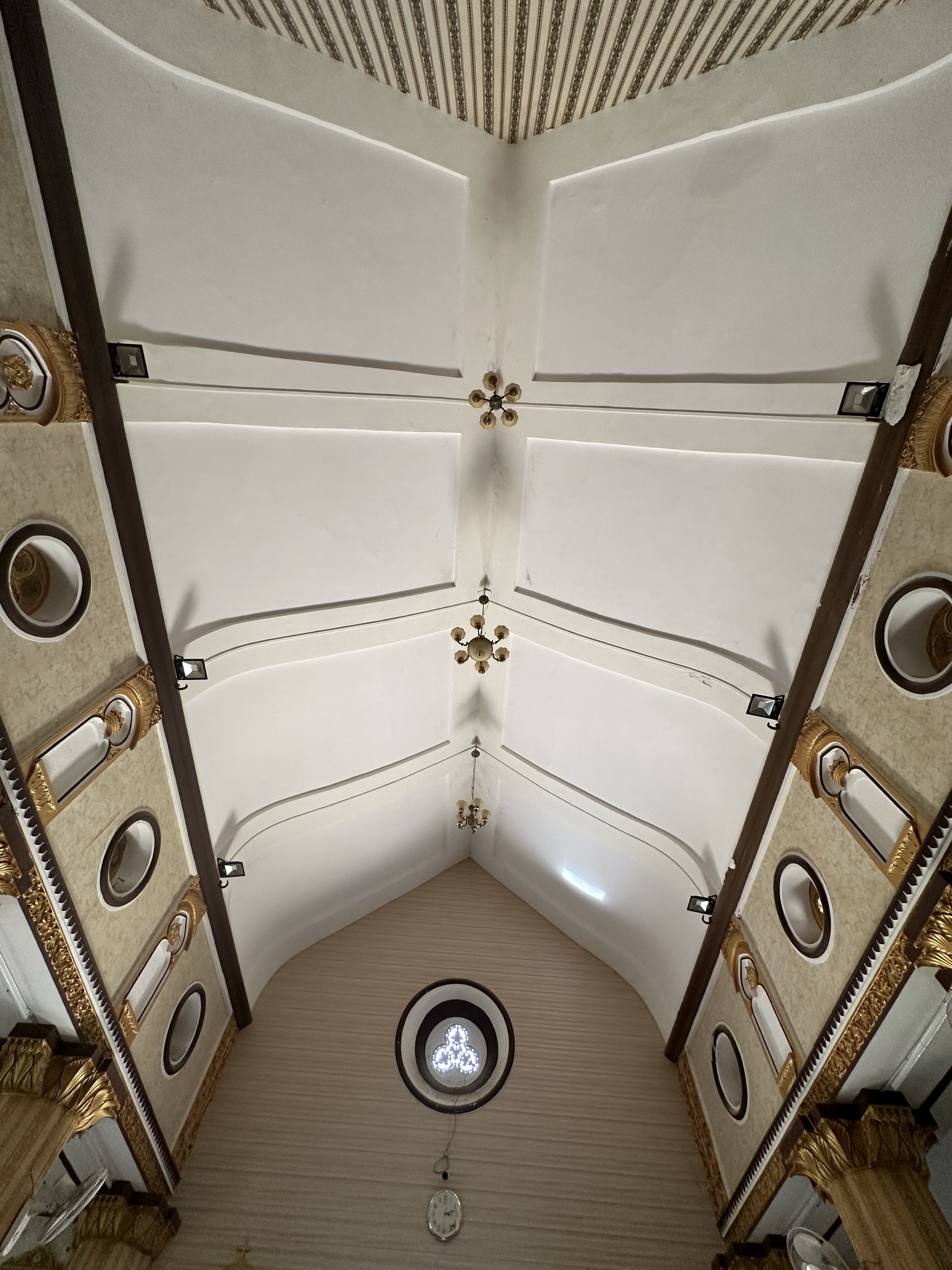
Ceiling

== Contributors ==
Frederic Growse paid one third of the cost of the church, and donations were also received from the bankers Seth Lachhman Das and Seth Lakhmi Chand, Captain Boyce Combe, the Lord Bishop of Agra, Seth Gobind Das, and others. The crucifix was donated by Lord Ralph Kerr, the Persian carpet covering the steps of the altar was given by John W. Tyler, the Stations of the Cross came from the 10th Royal Hussars, and the crystal chandelier for the choir from John Ellis of Agra. Lala Badri Prasad donated a marble chair, Lala Ratan Lal gave the font, and Seth Raghunath Das donated a further marble chair and chandelier.

== Reception ==
Growse was proud of the church, saying that visitors would "immediately understand that it was a Catholic Church, built in an eastern country for the use of a mixed congregation of Europeans and orientals" that mixed "oriental and western ideas". He reproduced favourable press comments in the reprint of his book Mathurá: A district memoir.
