= Mainpur =

Village development committee in Narayani Zone, Nepal

Coordinates: 27°2′N 84°45′E

Mainpur मैनपुर
- Village development committee
- Interactive map of Mainpur
- Country: Nepal
- Zone: Narayani Zone
- District: Parsa District

Population (2011)
  - Total: 3,232
- Time zone: UTC+5:45 (Nepal Time)

Mainpur is a village development committee in Parsa District in the Narayani Zone of southern Nepal. At the time of the 2011 Nepal census it had a population of 3,232 people living in 477 individual households. There were 1,695 males and 1,537 females at the time of census.
