= Elizabeth King (author) =

British diarist

- Born: 1843
- Died: 22 July 1917 (aged 73–74)

Elizabeth King (1843 – 22 July 1917), was a British diarist who accompanied her husband, Robert Moss King, to India, where she wrote The Diary of a Civilian's Wife in India 1877-1882, published in 1884. She died at home in Ashcott on 22 July 1917.
