= Robert Moss King =

British officer (1832–1903)

Robert Moss King (1832–1903), was a British officer in the Indian Civil Service, whose life in India is portrayed in his wife Elizabeth King's memoirs, The Diary of a Civilian's Wife in India 1877-1882.

== Early life and education ==
Robert Moss King was born in 1832, a son of the Reverend William Moss King. He was educated at Eton, then gained admission to Merton College, Oxford, from where he graduated in 1855, and joined the Indian Civil Service in 1856.

== Personal and family ==
In 1860 Moss King married Elizabeth Augusta Egerton. They had two sons and a daughter.

== Awards and honours ==
Moss King received the Indian Mutiny Medal.

== Death ==
Moss King died in 1903 at Ashcott.
