= The Diary of a Civilian's Wife in India 1877–1882 =

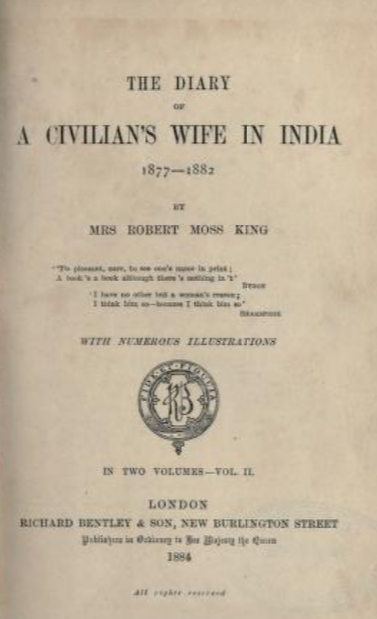
- Title page for The Diary of a Civilian's Wife in India 1877–1882 (1884)
- Author: Elizabeth King
- Language: English
- Published: 1884

The Diary of a Civilian's Wife in India 1877–1882 is a two-volume diary published in 1884 and written by the Elizabeth King (1843–1917), the wife of Robert Moss King (1832–1903), an Indian Civil Service officer. In it is chronicled her five years of travel in the North West Provinces, an administrative region in British India. It includes 32 full page illustrations drawn by King.
