= Horace Williamson =

British colonial officer (1880–1965)

Sir Horace Williamson

Director, Delhi Intelligence Bureau
- In office 1931–1936
- Preceded by: David Petrie

Special advisor to the Secretary of State for India

Personal details
- Born: 1880
- Died: 15 April 1965 (aged 84–85)
- Profession: Police officer

Sir Horace Williamson CIE, MBE (1880 - 15 April 1965) was a British colonial officer in the Indian Imperial Police and director of the Delhi Intelligence Bureau.

== Biography ==
Horace Wiiliamson was born in 1880 to a barrister. He was educated at Cheltenham College and joined the Indian Police Service in the United Provinces in 1900.

Williamson rose through the ranks, becoming in charge of the police in Agra in 1909. He then became Superintendent in 1913 and Assistant to the Inspector General in 1916. He was awarded the M.B.E. in 1919 and the C.I.E. in 1921. Promoted to Deputy Inspector General in 1923, he later served as Officiating Inspector General in 1928. In 1931, at the height of the civil disobedience movement, he succeeded David Petrie as Director of the Delhi Intelligence Bureau, a position for which he was awarded the King's Police Medal later that year. Between 1936 and 1942 he was special advisor to the Secretary of State for India.

He died in 1965.

== Selected publications ==
- India and Communism. Calcutta: Government of India Press. 1933.

== See also ==
- Augusta Fullam
- Bhagat Singh
