= List of Indian Civil Service (British India) officers posted to North-Western Provinces =

This is a list of Indian Civil Service (British India) officers posted to North-Western Provinces and Oudh, India.

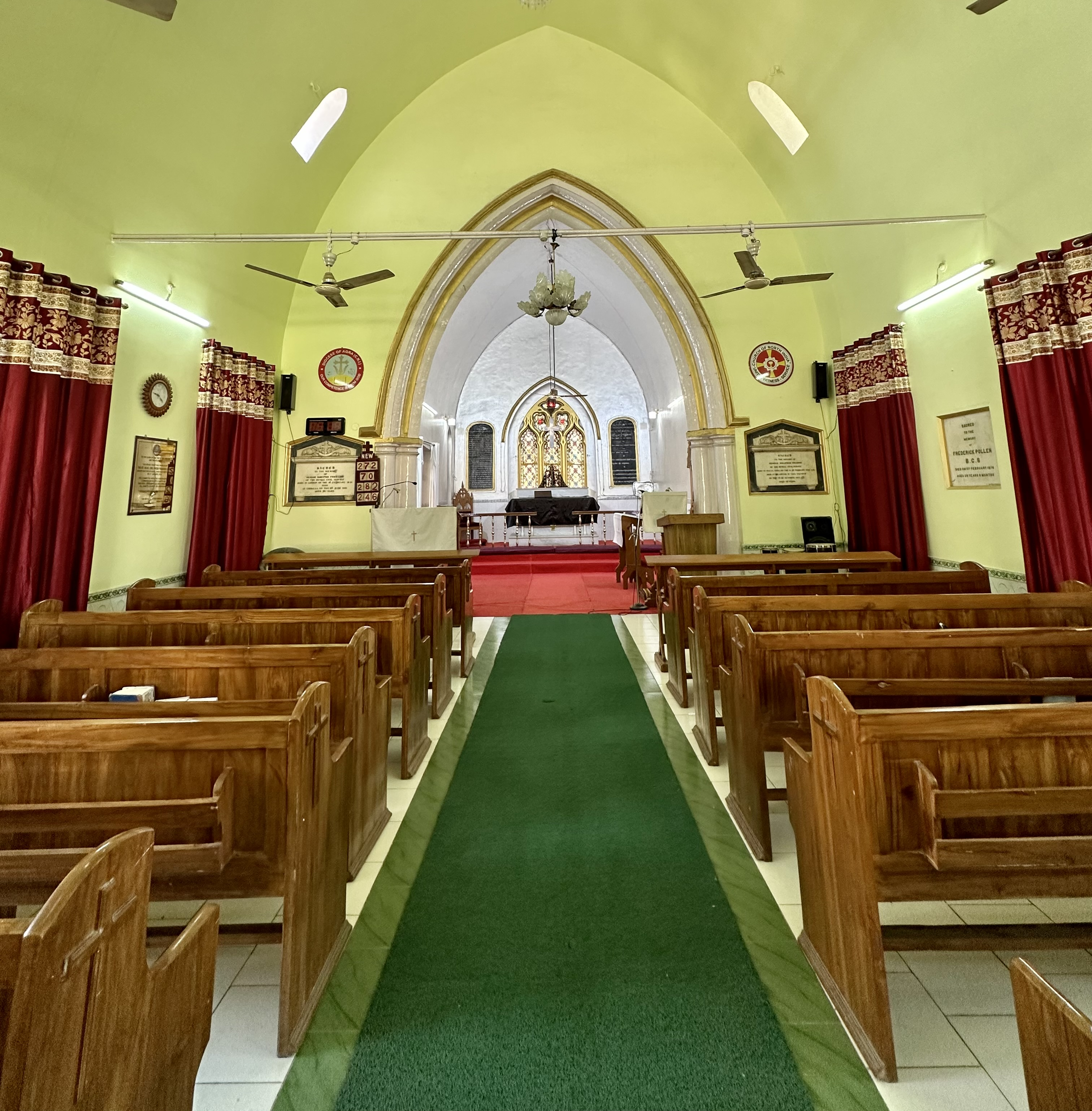
All Saints Church, Bulandshahr, where several plaques are erected in memory of administrators of Bulandshahr

Date in office at Bulandshar	Name	Notes
16 February - 15 March 1832	R. Lowther	First collector of the district of Bulandshahr.
16 March 1832 - end 1837	John Matthew Tierney	
March 1838 - end 1842	N. H. E. Prowett (died 30 November 1886)	
1843 - March 1845	J. F. Clarke	
5 March 1845 - 3 April 1852	Augustus Udny Chichele Plowden	
May 1852 - 21 April 1857	G. D. Turnbull	
December 1853	Robert Spankie	
1854	William Chichele Plowden	
22 April 1857 - 23 April 1858	Brand Sapte	
1858	Edmund Bensley Thornhill	
1859	Frederick Eden Elliott	
30 January 1860 - 6 June 1861	G. H. Freeling	
14 August 1861 - 30 July 1862	W. H. Lowe	
27 December 1862 – 19 March 1863	Robert Simson	
20 March 1863- 6 October 1863	G. W. Colledge	
22 November 1863 – 16 April 1865	H. G. Keene	
17 April 1865 - 16 August 1867	H. B. Webster	
17 October 1867 - 16 July 1869	C. A. Daniell	
23 August 1869 -	H. D. Willock	
	Frederick Pollen	
	William Young	
	Elliott Colvin	
1874	William Charles Turner	
November 1877 - 1884	Frederic Growse	
	Arthur Edwin Comerford Casey	

== Bibliography ==
- Danvers, Frederick Charles; Monier-Williams, Sir Monier; Bayley, Sir Steuart Colvin; Wigram, Percy; Sapte, Brand (1894). Memorials of Old Haileybury College. A. Constable.
- Smeaton, R, ed. (1881). History of services of gazetted officers employed under the government of the N.W.P. and Oudh. Corrected up to 1st Jan., 1881. Allahabad: North-Western Provinces and Oudh Govt. Press.
- Singh, Kuar Lachman (1874). Historical and Statistical Memoir of Zila Bulandshahar. Allahabad: North-Western Provinces Government Press. ISBN 978-3-382-50031-3.
