= Robert Lowther (collector) =

Robert Lowther (c.1790 - 10 January 1879), was the first Collector of the district of Bulandshahr, North-Western Provinces, India, from 16 February 1824 to 15 March 1832. He is credited with raising the state of that town from a collection of mud huts to a flourishing and more populous town. His successors included George Dundas Turnbull, Charles Currie, and H. B. Webster.

Lowther entered Haileybury in 1808. He married Laura Martinadle in 1847.

== See also ==
- List of administrators of Bulandshahr
