= Bhatola, Bulandshahr =

Coordinates: 28°18′N 78°0′E

Bhatola is a Gondi village approx 2.5 km from Shikarpur in Bulandshahr district, in the Indian state of Uttar Pradesh. It is a mainly Pandit & Tyagi village, with a population of about 3,000.
