= Hurthala, Uttar Pradesh =

Coordinates: 28°18′N 77°55′E

Hurthala
- village
- Interactive map of Hurthala
- Country: India
- State: Uttar Pradesh

Government
  - Body: Gram panchayat

Languages
  - Official: Hindi
- Time zone: UTC+5:30 (IST)
- Vehicle registration: UP
- Website: up.gov.in

Hurthala is a village in Shikarpur Tehsil, Bulandshahr district, Uttar Pradesh, India.

Hurthala is located 4 kilometers from Salempur on 14 km at Bulandshahar - Shikarpur road.
