= Brand Sapte =

- Born: c1825
- Died: 6 June 1891

Brand Sapte (c1825 - 6 June 1891), succeeded George Dundas Turnbull as Collector of the district of Bulandshahr, and later became judge at Farrukhabad, North-Western Provinces, India. He wrote short biographies of all the men from Haileybury who fought against the Indian Rebellion of 1857. Having spent two years at Haileybury he arrived in India in 1843 and remained there until 1871. He died on 6 June 1891 at 116 Gloucester Terrace, London.

== See also ==
- List of administrators of Bulandshahr
