= Lathore =

Lathore is a village in Bulandshahr district in the state of Uttar Pradesh, India. It is under administrative headquarters of Bulandshahr District. According to Government of India, the district Bulandshahr is one of the Minority Concentrated District in India on the basis of the 2001 census data on population, socio-economic indicators and basic amenities indicators. Google Map of Lauthor
