= All Saints Church, Bulandshahr =

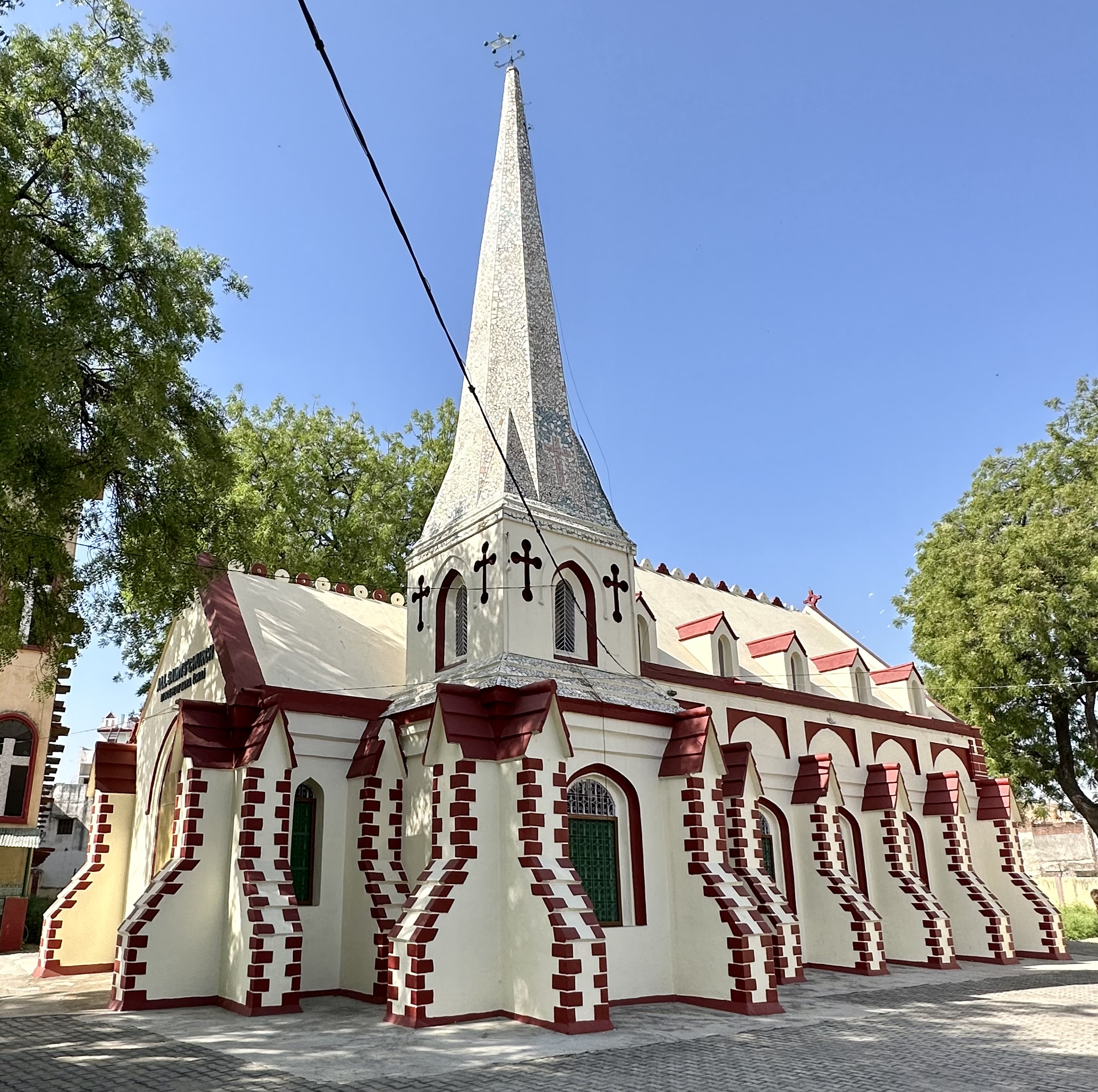
- All Saints Church, Bulandshahr
- 28°24′34″N 77°50′34″E
- Country: India

History
- Founder: William Lowe

Architecture
- Completed: 1864

All Saints Church is a church in Bulandshahr, India. It was constructed by the Public Works Department and completed in 1864. An adjacent dispensary, which later became a school, was added in 1867 and the caretaker's lodge was erected in 1883.

The structure was funded by local subscriptions and subsidised by the British Government, who contributed half the cost. The money was raised under the supervision of the district magistrate and collector of Bulandshahr, William Lowe. He died in 1862 and was buried in the chancel.

== Location ==
All Saints Church is a church in Bulandshahr, India, located to the far west of the town's railway station.

== History ==
At the turn of the 20th century Bulandshahr had a Church of England station and it was home to around 51 Europeans and Eurasians, of which 30 were Church of England.

The church was constructed by the Public Works Department, and the contractor was Mr. Mitchell. It was completed in 1864 at a cost of ₹5,700 (equivalent to ₹2.8 million or US$29,000 in 2023), raised by subscriptions led by district magistrate and collector of Bulandshahr, William Lowe, and subsidised by the British Government, who contributed half the cost. A dispensary was constructed alongside the church in 1867 and was later converted to a school. A caretaker's lodge was added in 1883.

== Architecture ==
=== Exterior ===
The building has a gable roof, with small buttresses and pointed window and door arches.

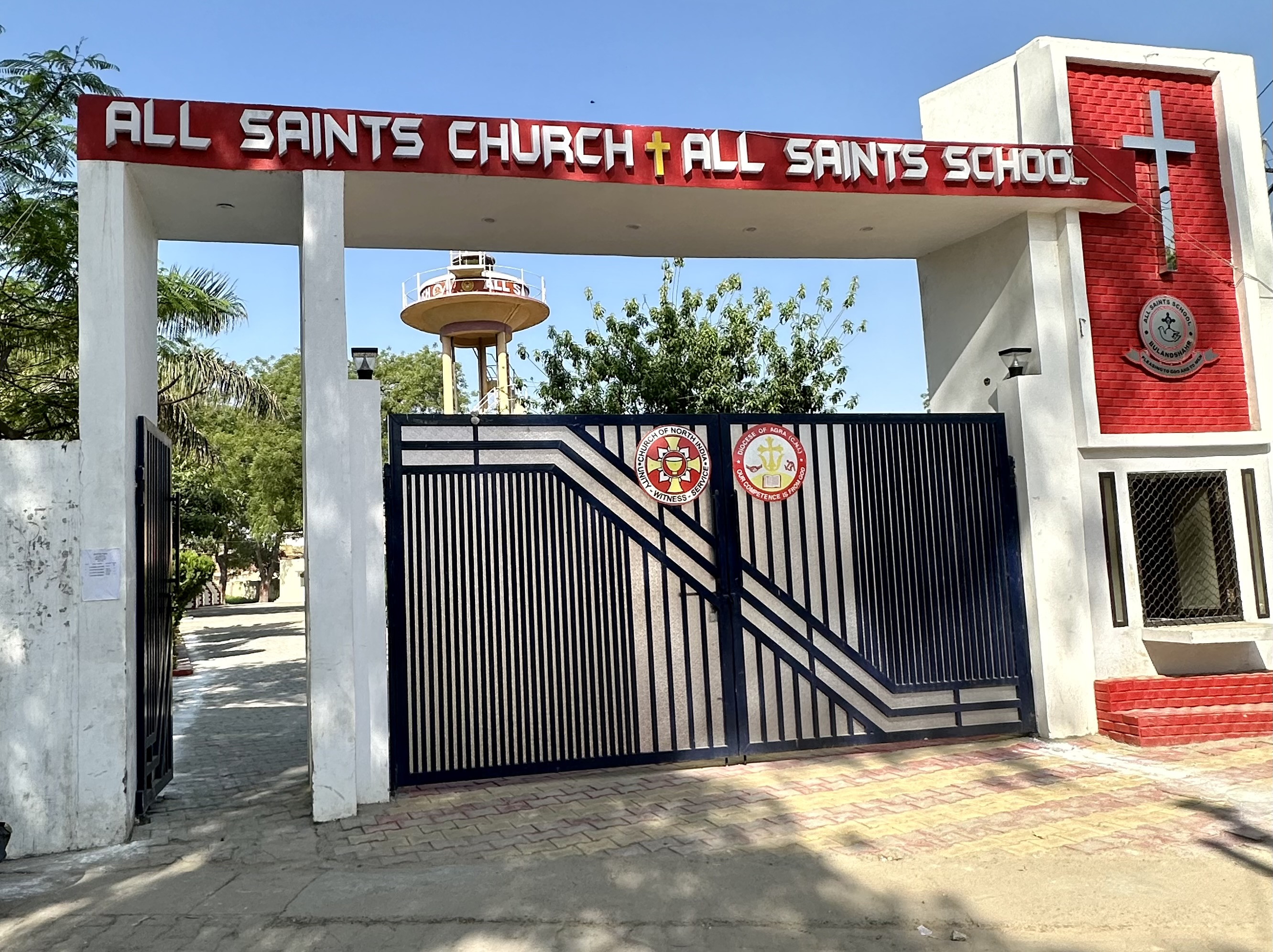
Frontage

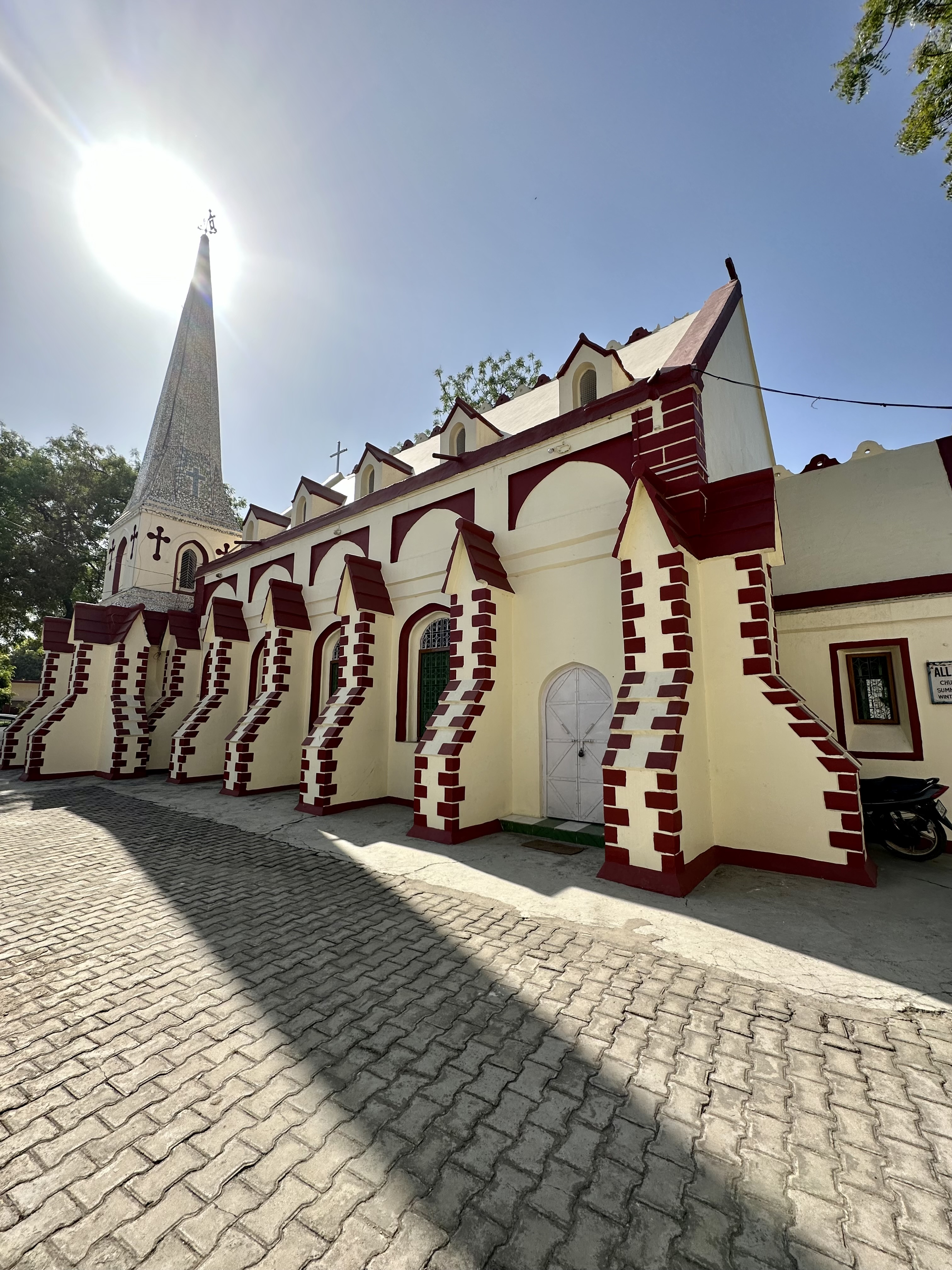
Exterior

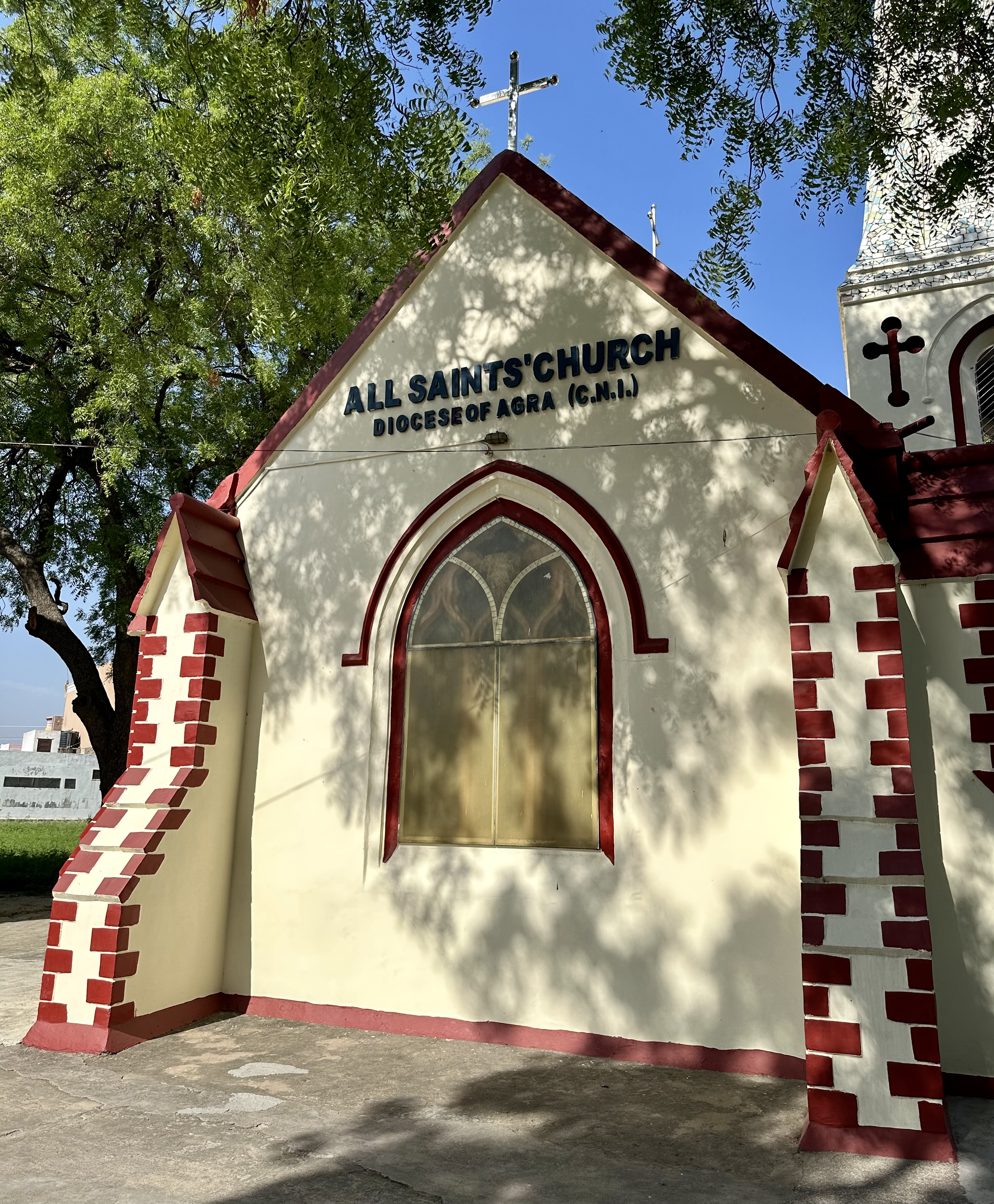
Exterior

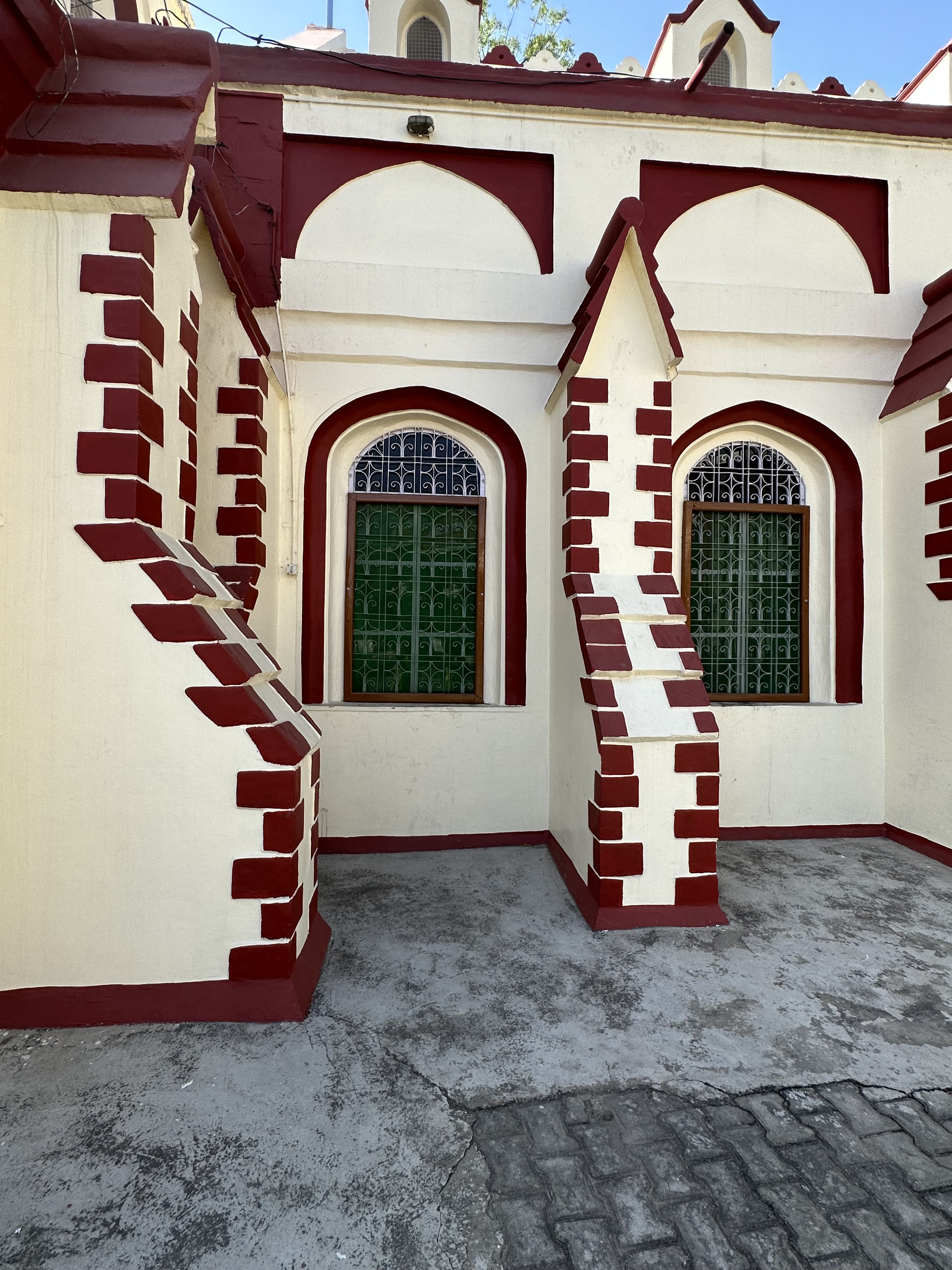
Exterior (close-up)

=== Interior ===
The interior consists of two rooms: the nave and chancel. Lowe, who died in 1862, is buried in the chancel.

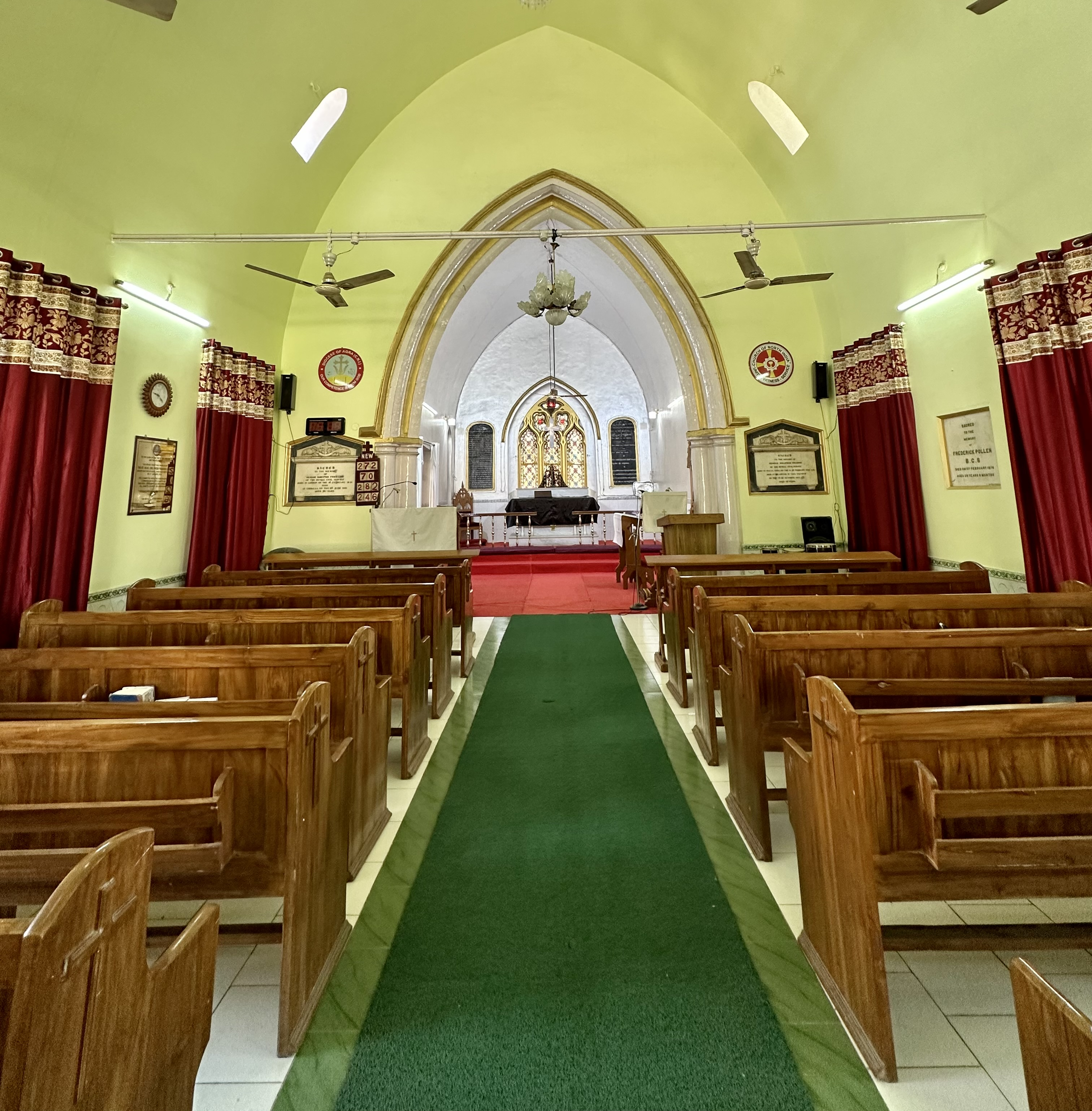
Interior

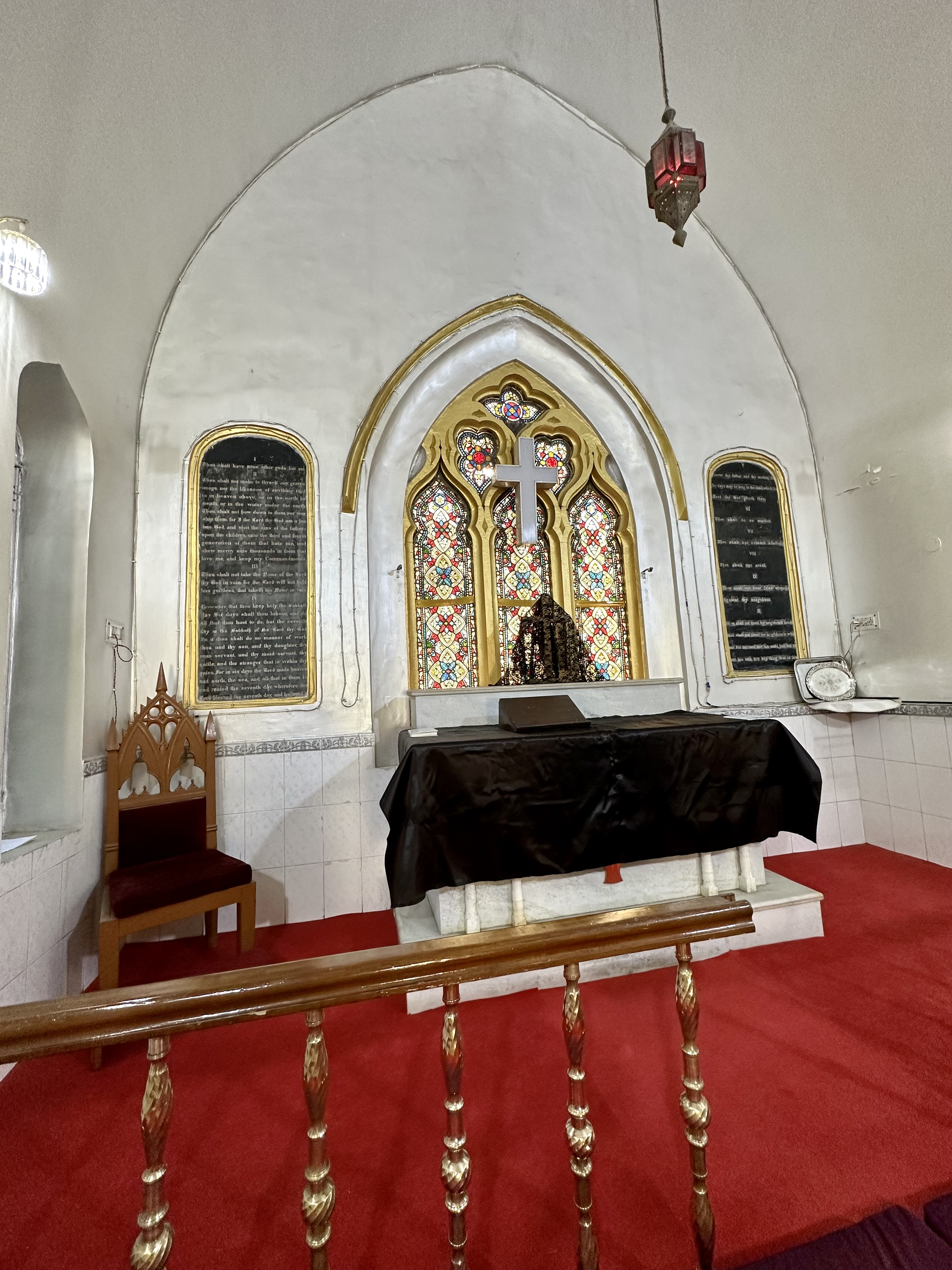
Interior

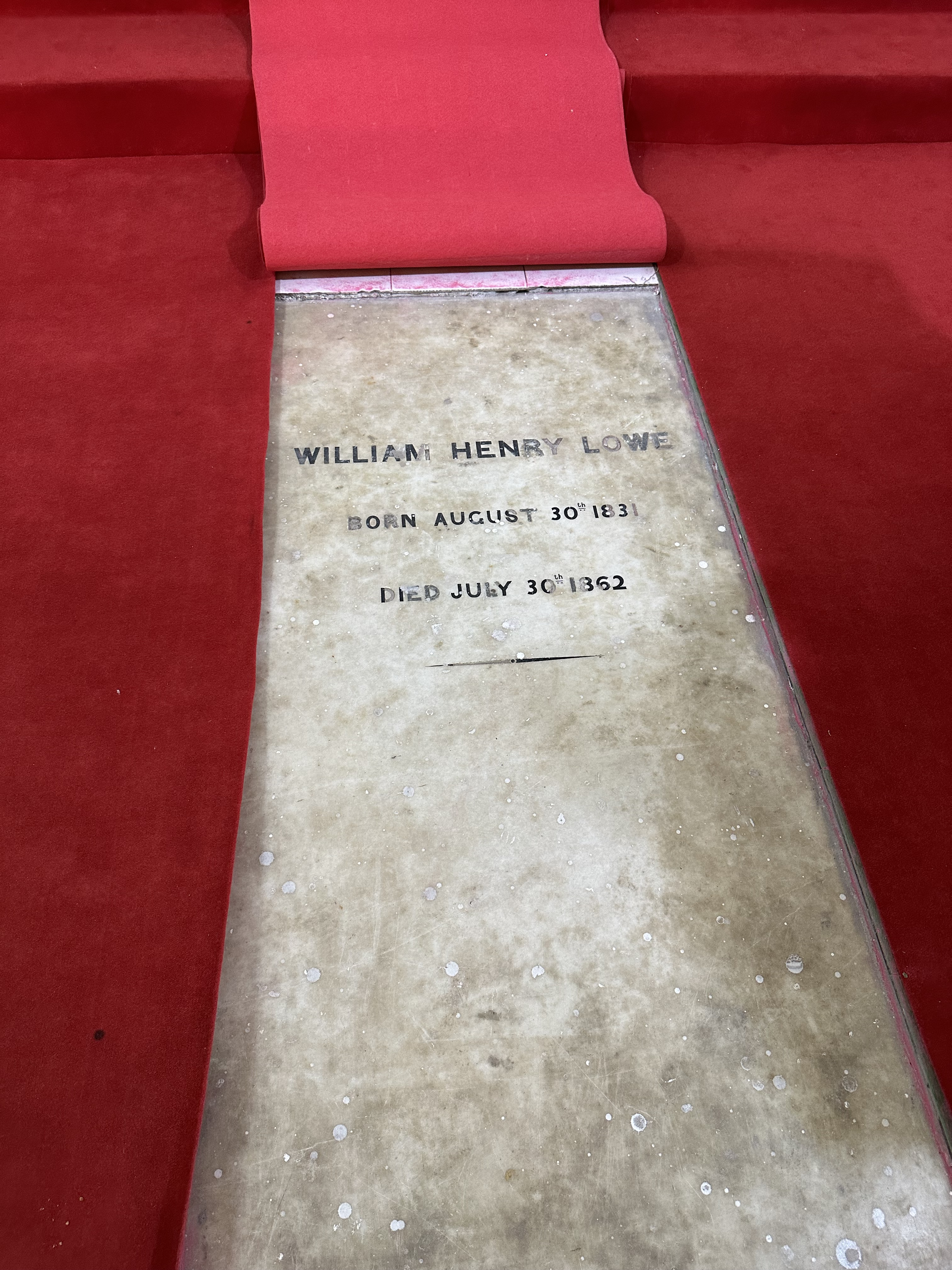
Lowe grave in the chancel

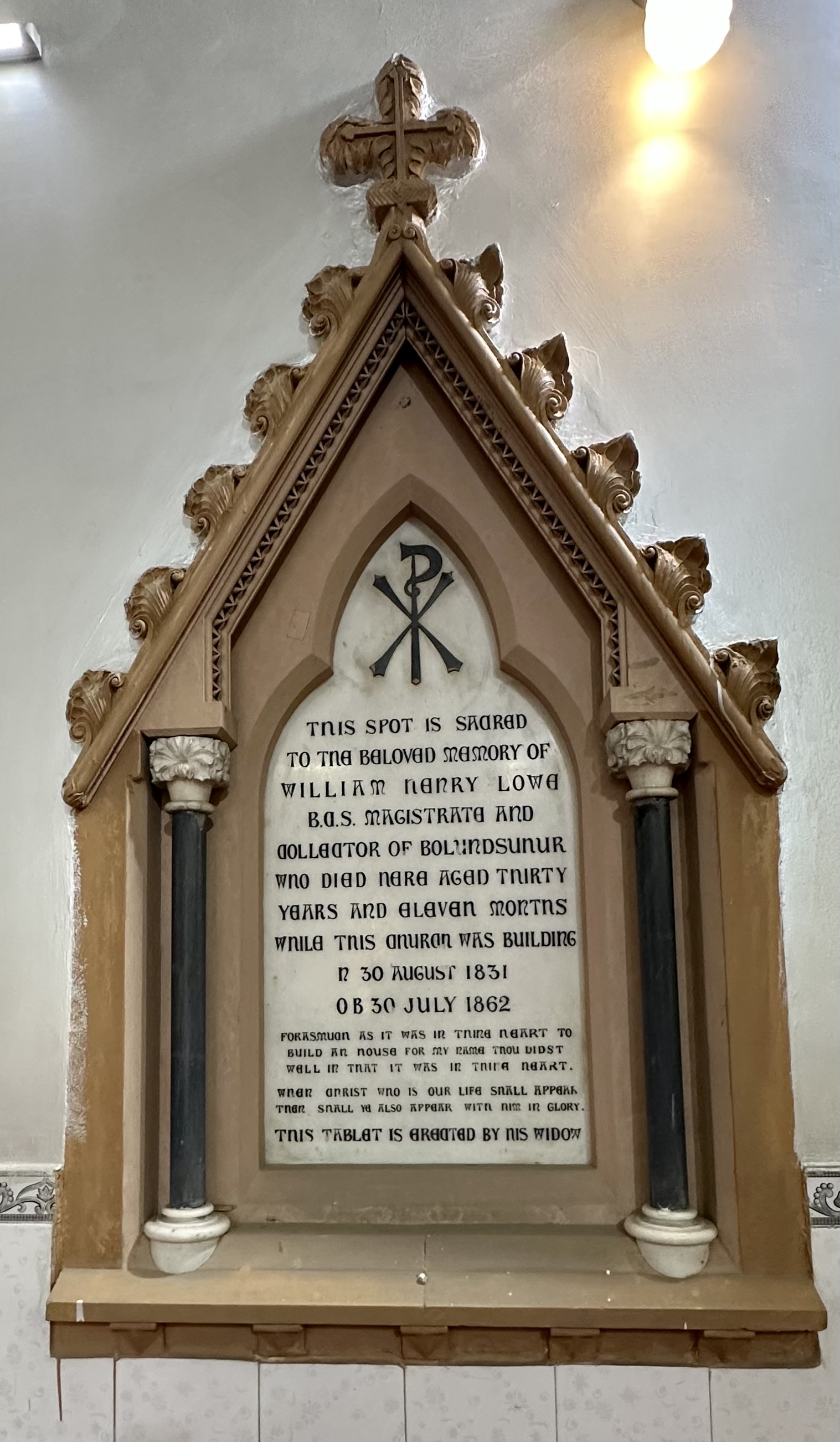
Lowe memorial plaque

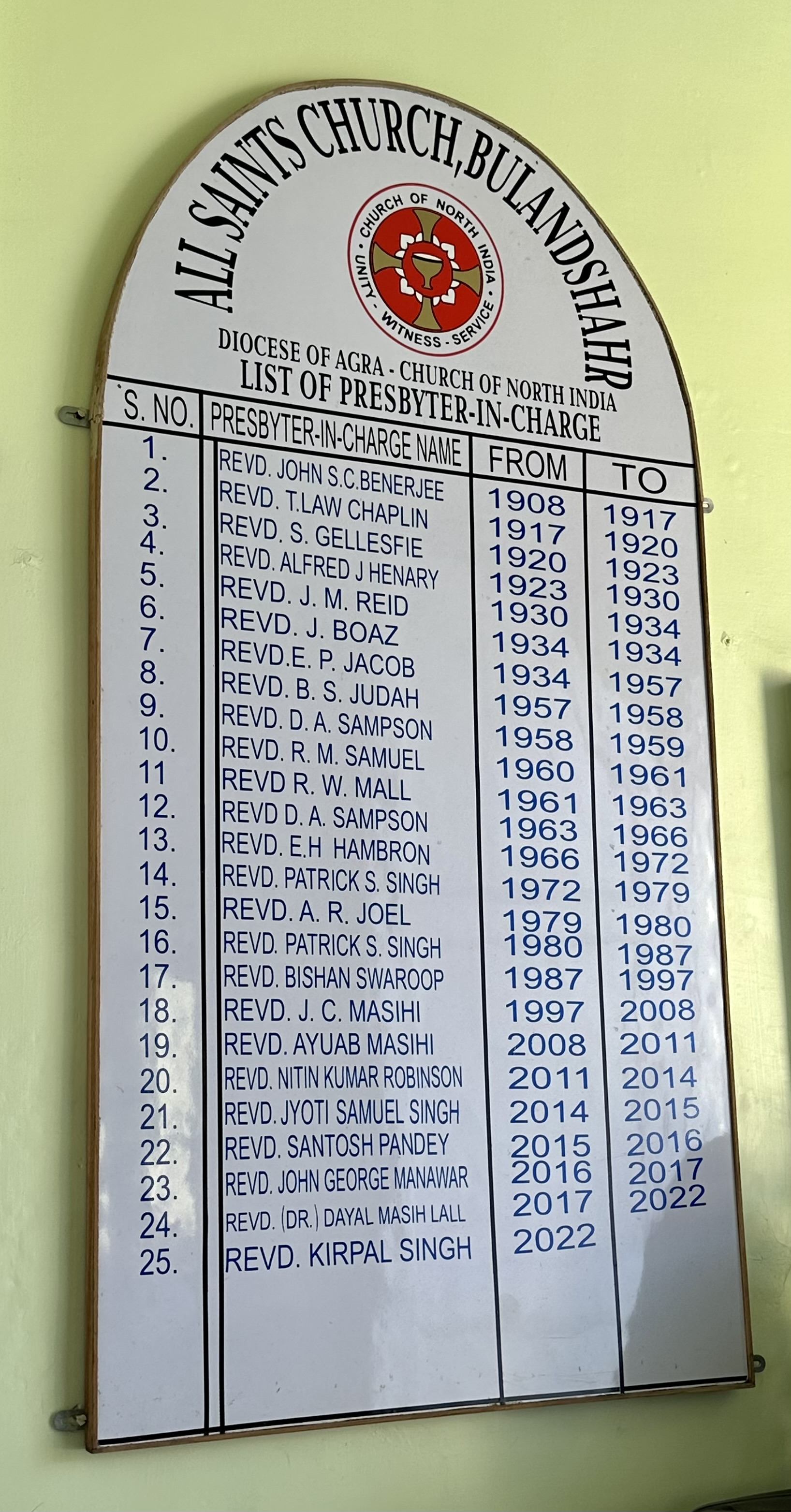
List of reverends

== Response ==
Frederic Growse, a later collector of Bulandshahr, described the church as "a pretty little building", but its associated lodge as "a practical joke". In his opinion the roof of the church was "grotesque" and the lodge was not large enough for any person to live in.

== See also ==
- George Welstead Colledge
- George Freeling
- Frederick Pollen
