= Derveshpur =

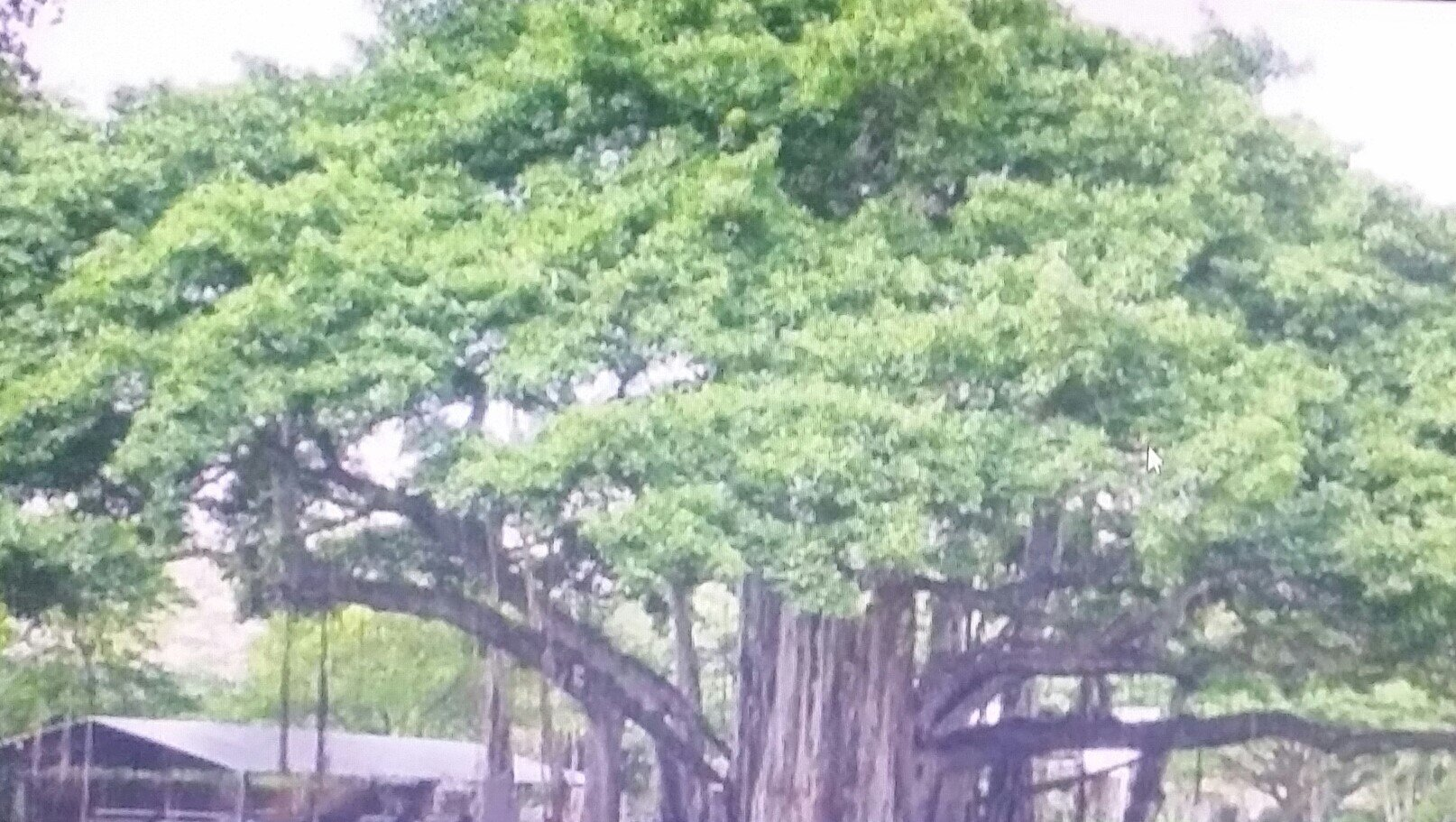
Derveshpur vat vriksha

Derveshpur is a village located in Shikarpur Tehsil of Bulandshahr district in the Indian state Uttar Pradesh. Its postal PIN code is 203395.The village name is commonly written in Hindi as “दरवेशपुर”

== History ==
Derveshpur was founded by a person known by the title 'Dervesh'. Thereafter,the Nauhwar dynasty laid the foundation of Derveshpur.

== Demographics ==
The village is inhabited by various communities,including Brahmin, Jat, Dagar, Nauhwar, Roria, Lochav (Panwar), Dhimar (Kashyap),Khatik, Jatav, Balmiki and Muslim communities.

== Religious Places ==
- Shiv Mandir :Jat Chowk Near Chaupal, was a place where Jat Community members would sit together, share thoughts, and strengthen bonds
- Maa Durga Mandir
- Chamad Mata Than and Pathwari Mata Than
- Sri Chaitanya Mahaprabhu Goshala: established in 2018, is devoted to the protection and care of cows.
- Sri Radhe Krishn Mandir, A temple dedicated to Sri Radhe and Lord Sri Krishna.

== Education ==
- Bhudevi Aadrash Janta Inter College
- Primary School
