= William Lowe (civil servant) =

British civil servant of the Indian Civil Service (ICS)

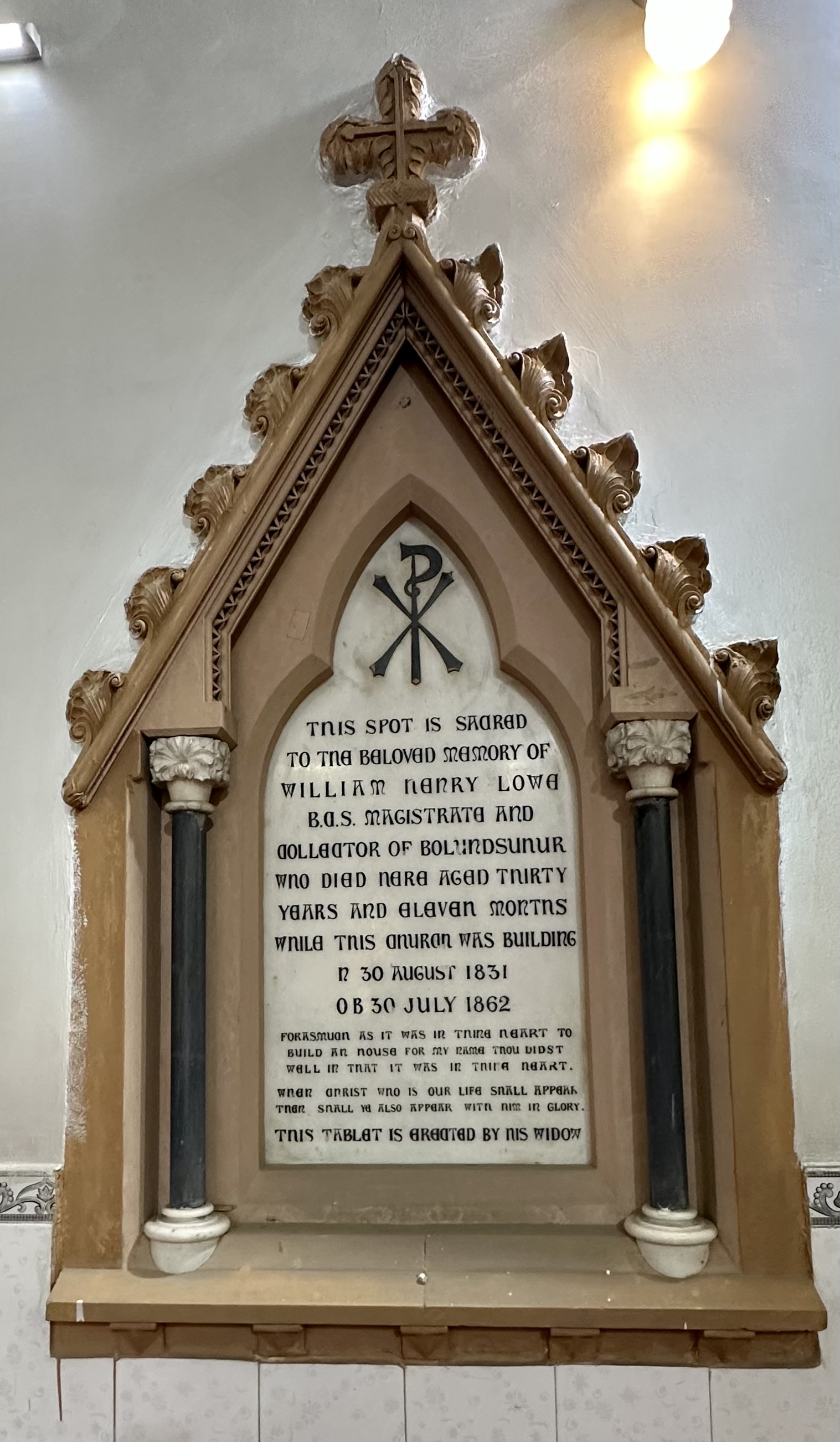
- Memorial plaque inside All Saints Church (Bulandshahr)
- Born: William Henry Lowe; 30 August 1831; Calcutta, India
- Died: 30 July 1862 (aged 30); Bulandshahr, India
- Occupation: District magistrate and collector for Indian Civil Service
- Known for: Led funding of the All Saints Church, Bulandshahr

William Henry Lowe (30 August 1831 – 30 July 1862), was a British district magistrate and collector of the district of Bulandshahr, during British rule of India. He led the funding of the construction of the All Saints Church in Bulandshahr. The Lowe memorial building by the district magistrate's court in Bulandshahr was named for him. He died at age 30 of natural causes.

== Early life and family ==
William Lowe was born on 30 August 1831 in Calcutta, to John Lowe. He married a daughter of Sir William Muir. They had a son, William Henry Muir Lowe. Elizabeth Huntley was his only daughter.

== Career ==
Lowe succeeded George Hamilton Freeling as district magistrate and collector for the district of Bulandshahr. In that role he led the funding of the construction of All Saints Church on the far west side of the town Bulandshahr. It was completed in 1864 and later described by the subsequent collector F. S. Growse as a "pretty little building" with the caretakers accommodation as a "practical joke".

=== Wolf child ===
The feral child Dina Sanichar, may have been the inspiration for the character Mowgli in The Jungle Book by Rudyard Kipling. The traditional story has been that the boy was brought to the attention of Bulandshahr's district magistrate after hunters discovered the child in a cave in the district of Bulandshahr. This magistrate has been cited as being Lowe. However, Lowe had died five years earlier. A letter from W. F. Prideaux to the editor of the North British Advertiser and Ladies Journal (1885) questioned the authenticity of 'wolf boys' in general, and of particularly the one at the "orphanage at Secundra, near Agra". Prideaux requested the name of the magistrate and further details of the wolf boy. In response, the orphanage replied that the boy came to them in 1867 after being found by William Lowe, then collector of Bulandshahr". Prideaux noted that no official report on the story existed, and the year and Officer's name was given from a recollection sufficiently long after to question its accuracy.

== Death and legacy ==
Lowe died on 30 July 1862, a day before a planned move to England. He is buried in the chancel of Bulandshahr's All Saints Church, which had been commissioned by his widow. The Lowe memorial building by the district magistrate's court, acting as a shelter for those attending the courts, was named for him. The inscription read;

This building has been erected by the Europeans and native-official and non-official residents of the station and district as a token of their respect and esteem, and as a memorial of the late William Henry Lowe, Esquire, who died while collector of this district on the 30th of July 1862, AD.

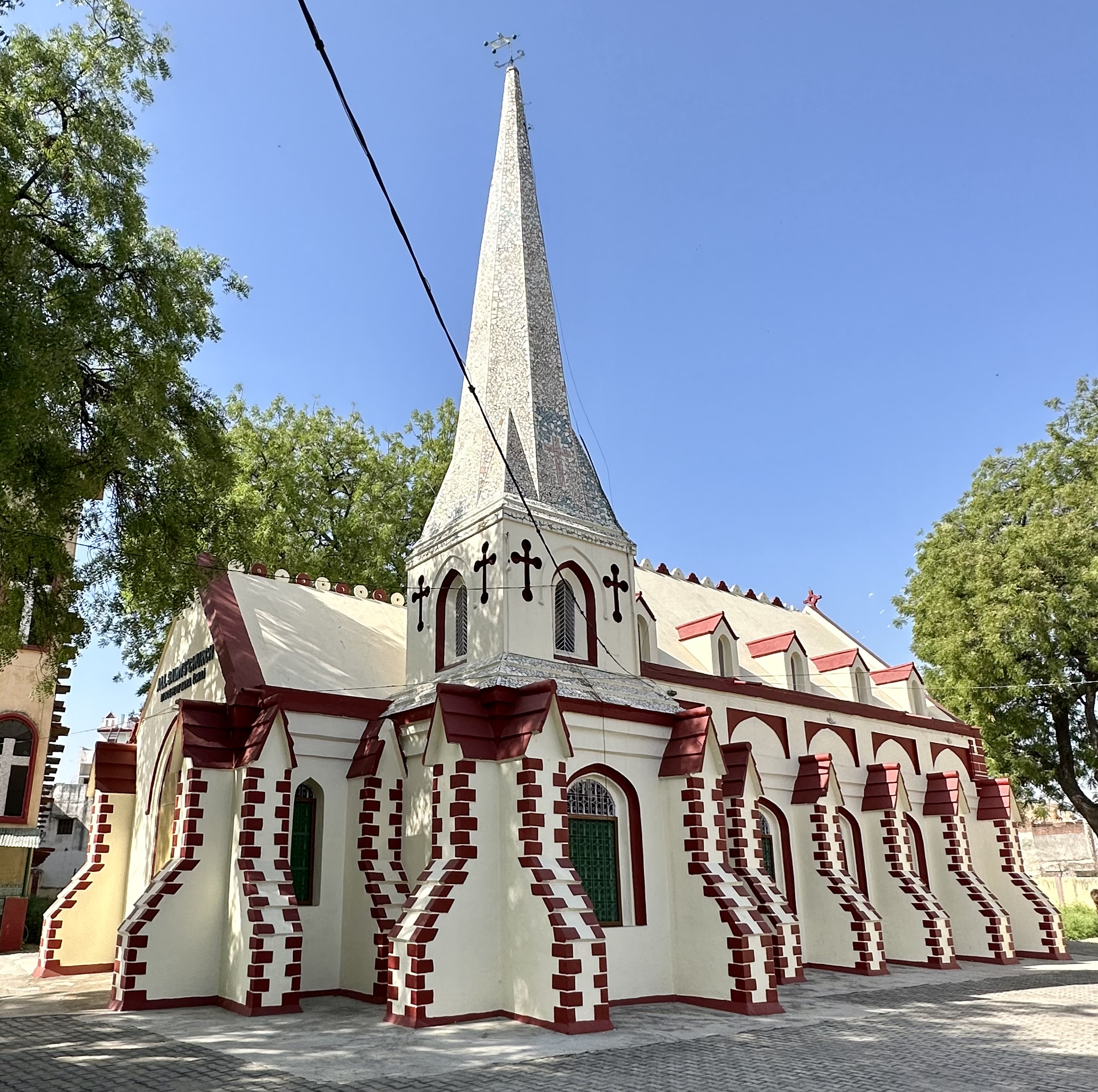
All Saints Church, Bulandshahr

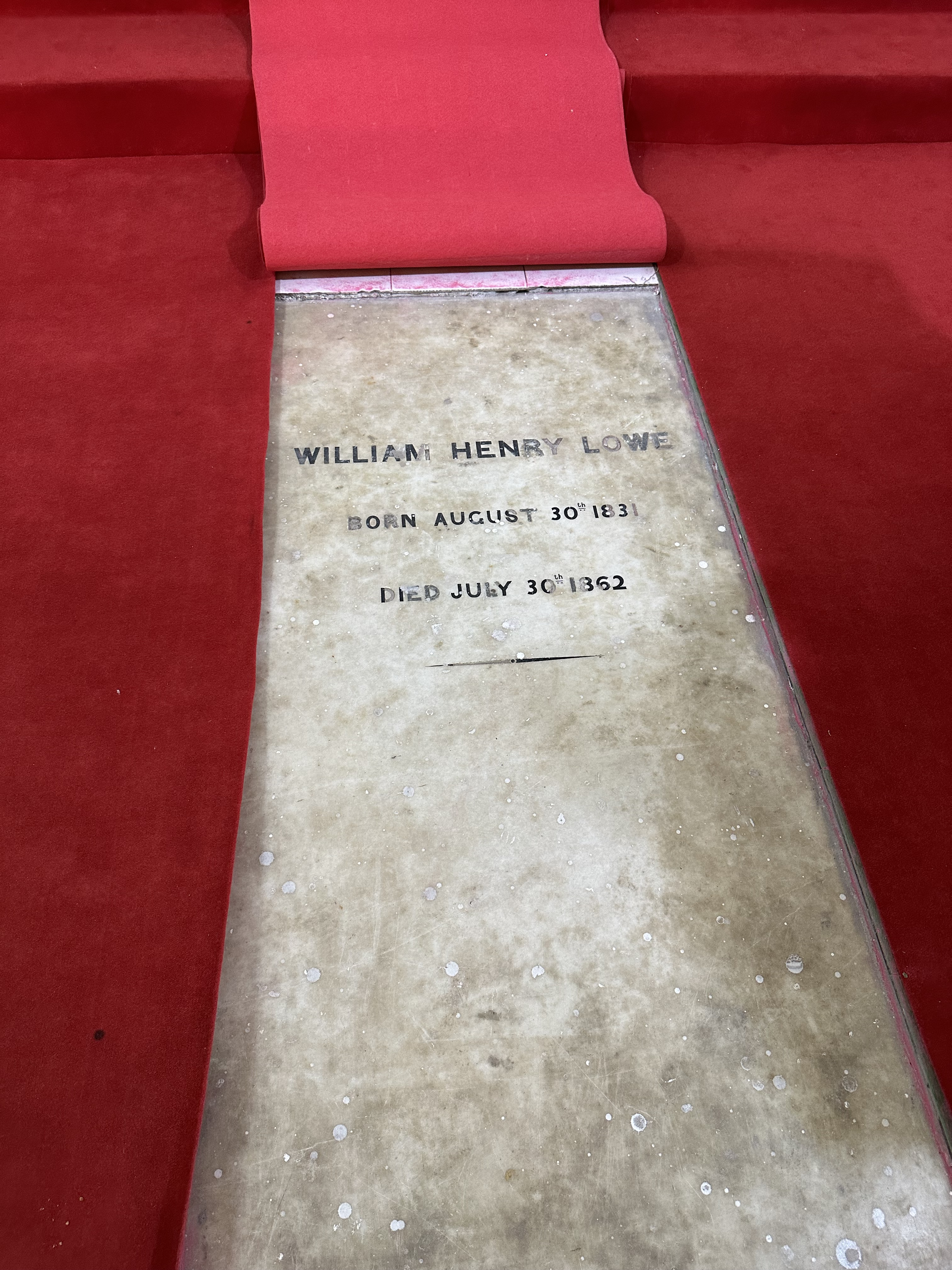
Lowe's grave in the chancel of the church

== See also ==
- Frederick Pollen
