= Sega Jagatpur =

Sega Jagatpur Sega
- village
- Nickname: Sega
- Location in Uttar Pradesh, India Sega Jagatpur (India)
- Coordinates: 28°39′15″N 77°57′22″E
- Country: India
- State: Uttar Pradesh
- District: Bulandshahr

Population (2011)
  - Total: 2,675 approx

Languages
  - Official: Hindi
- Time zone: UTC+5:30 (IST)
- PIN: 203407
- Vehicle registration: UP 13

Sega Jagatpur is a village in tehsil Siyana in the Bulandshahr district of Uttar Pradesh, India. The village is situated at the road which connects Lakhaoti to Saidpur, Bulandshahr. The village has a post office, a government middle school, and a primary health centre.

History and Ethnography. The Village is believed to have been established around 1760. The initial residents of the Village were the Jats of the Dalal gotra who were close family of the Rulers of Kuchesar. Due to the availability of adequate cultivable land, the initial residents invited their relatives who were also looking for land. Slowly the village population grew but the Dalal gotra remained the dominant Jat gotra in the Village.

People of Sega Jagatpur have fought in World War I and World War II as part of the British Indian Army. The people from this village have also participated in the freedom struggle as part of the Indian National Army under the leadership of Netaji Subhash Bose. The village has continued its proud martial traditions and continues to contribute in large numbers to the Indian Armed Forces and paramilitary forces.The young residents of this village are providing services in Indian army, police, airforce, navy and legal areas.

Mohit Dalal who worked in SPG.

Gaurav Dalal being a lawyer, providing legal services as segent and most famous lawyer in Supreme Court of India as well as Delhi High court.

Also Pawan Chaudhary advocate is providing his services in taxation area and working with most of the branded companies.

Sumit Chaudhary is providing his techie services.

Alok Sharma is running institutes in Delhi NCR to provide good future to the young persons.

Pankaj Chaudhary is providing his services in the administration of Uttar Pradesh government.

Apart from these notable residents of this village, many other persons also working in the different area.
