= Mudibakapur =

Village in Bulandshahr, Uttar Pradesh, India

Mudibakapur is a village about 2 km from Aurangabad in Bulandshahr district of Uttar Pradesh state in northern India. It has a gram panchayat and comes under Lakhaoti Block.
