= Dina Sanichar =

Feral boy found in India (c. 1860–1895)

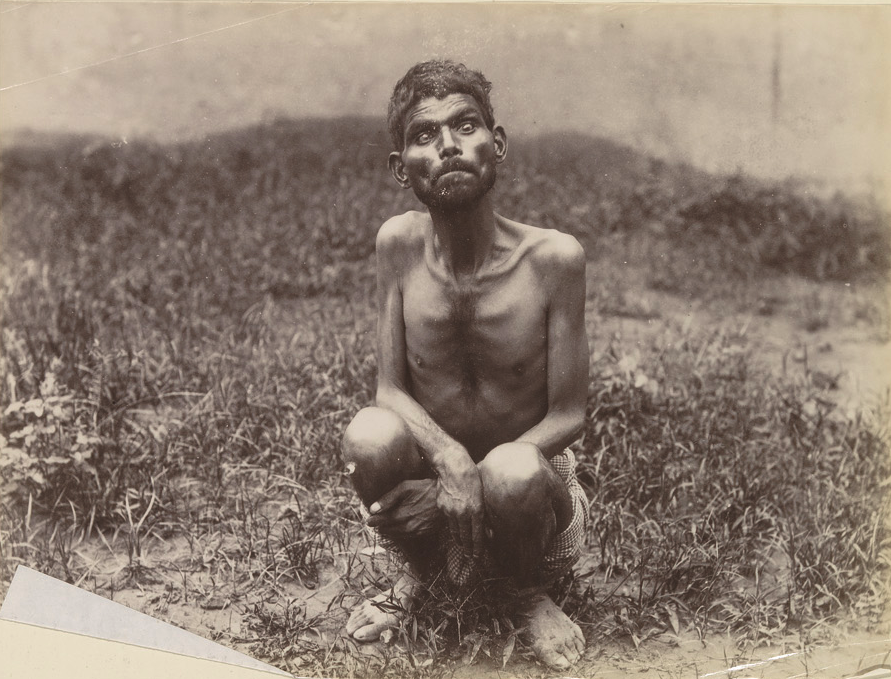
Sanichar as a young man, c. 1889–1894

Dina Sanichar (1860/1861 – 1895) was a feral boy. A group of hunters discovered him among wolves in a cave in Bulandshahr, Uttar Pradesh, India in February 1867, around the age of six.

Sanichar was sent to the Sikandra orphanage at Agra, where he lived among other humans for over twenty years. He never learned to speak and remained seriously impaired his entire life.

== Discovery ==
Dina Sanichar was discovered in a cave in the district of Bulandshahr and was brought to the local district magistrate and collector. He was subsequently sent to the Secundra orphanage at Agra.

At the orphanage he was given the name Sanichar (meaning Saturday) because he arrived on a Saturday. It was reported that he initially walked on all fours and ate raw meat. While he could not speak, he would make sounds similar to a wolf. He went on to live among other humans for over twenty years but never learned to speak, and remained seriously impaired his entire life. Sanichar was a heavy smoker.

== Death and legacy ==
Sanichar died of tuberculosis in 1895 around the age of 34.

Sanichar may have been the inspiration for the character Mowgli in The Jungle Book by Rudyard Kipling.

== See also ==
- William Lowe (civil servant)
- Feral Child
- Jerome of Sandy Cove
