= Charles Currie (civil servant) =

- Died: 1878

Charles Currie (died 1878), succeeded George Hamilton Freeling as Collector of the district of Bulandshahr, North-Western Provinces, India. There, along with H. B. Webster and G. D. Turnbull, he was known for his contributions to some of the late nineteenth century buildings at the town of Bulandshahr.

Currie attended Haileybury from 1848 to 1850, and that same year arrived in India. In 1865 he was appointed Commissioner. There, 10 years later, he was Judicial Commissioner.
