= Chingravthi =

Village in Uttar Pradesh, India

Coordinates: 28.23175495111764°N 77.78169705398932°E

Chingravthi is a village in the Bulandshahr district of Uttar Pradesh, India.
