= Myorabad =

Coordinates: 25°29′N 81°51′E

Myorabad is ward number 27 of Allahabad (officially Prayagraj), in Uttar Pradesh, India. It is ward number 8 in Allahabad Nagar Nigam elections, and a village in the district of Allahabad. According to the 2001 census, the ward of Myorabad had a population of 19,270.

Muirabad was a village near Allahabad, named after Sir William Muir. It had a population of six hundred in 1882.

St Peter's Church, which dates from 1872, is in both Myorabad and Muirabad.
