= George Freeling =

British indian civil servant

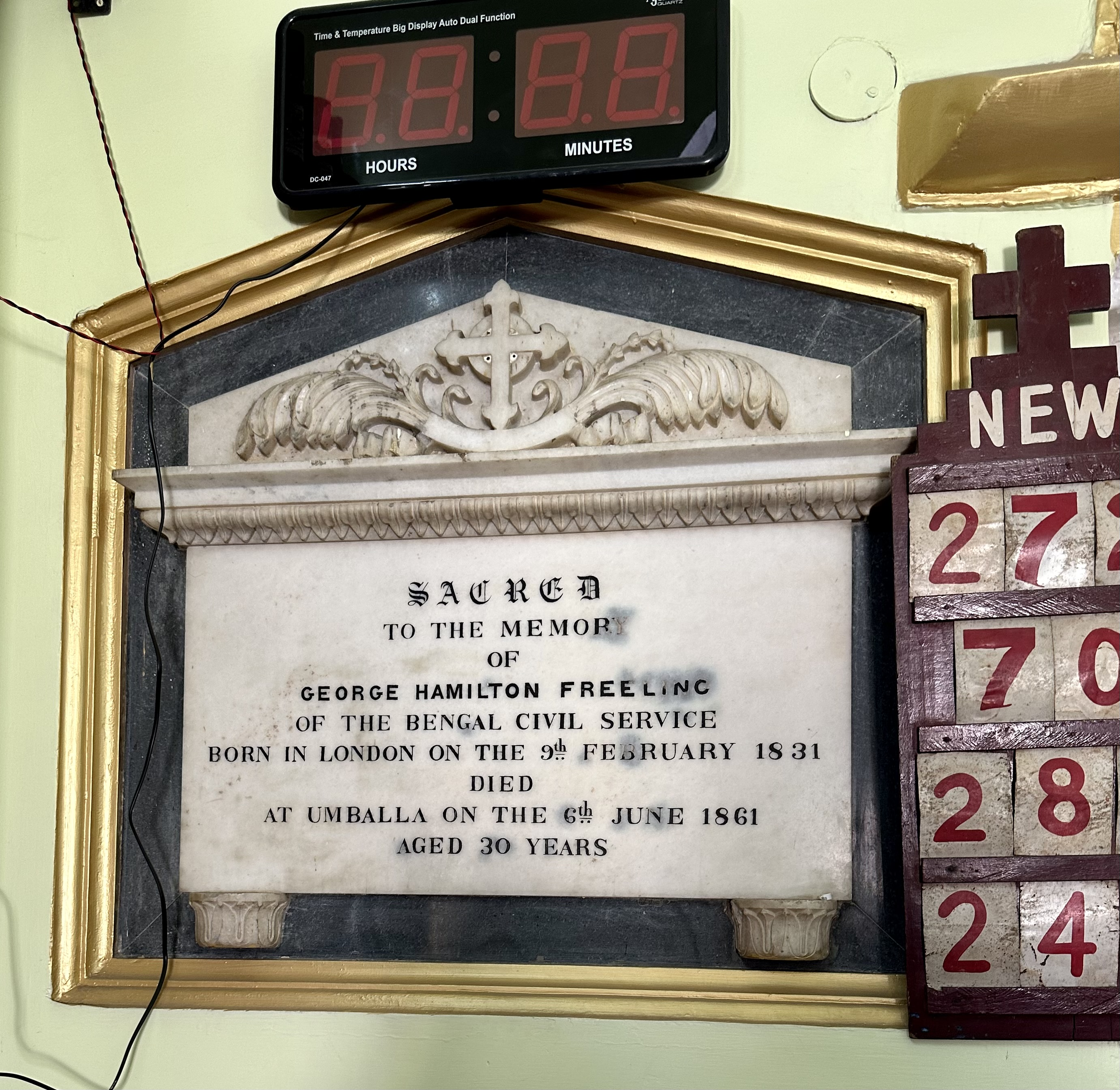
George Hamilton Freeling, plaque in All Saints Church, Bulandshahr

George Hamilton Freeling (9 February 1831 – 6 June 1861) was a British civil servant of the Indian Civil Service (ICS) and collector at Bulandshahr, India. He was succeeded by William Lowe.

Freeling collected a large number of ancient coins found at Bulandshahr. He was a recipient of an Indian Mutiny Medal.

== Early life and family ==
George Freeling was born in London on 9 February 1831 to George Henry and Jane Freeling. He was christened on 15 March 1831 at St Botolph's, Aldersgate, London.

== Career ==
Freeling was a civil servant of the Indian Civil Service (ICS), who took over from Charles Currie as collector at Bulandshahr. He was subsequently succeeded by William Lowe. He collected a large number of ancient coins found at Bulandshahr. He was previously magistrate, collector and deputy commissioner at Hamirpur during the Indian Rebellion of 1857.

== Awards and honours ==
He was a recipient of an Indian Mutiny Medal.

== Death ==
Freeling died at Ambala on 6 June 1861. Probate was granted in England in December 1868 to Edith Anna Freeling.

== Selected publications ==
- Narrative of Events Connected with the Mutiny at Humeerpore (1858).
