= William Muir =

Scottish colonial administrator (1819–1905)

Sir William Muir KCSI (27 April 1819 – 11 July 1905) was a Scottish Orientalist and colonial administrator. He served as Lieutenant Governor of the North-Western Provinces of British India from 1868 and as Principal of the University of Edinburgh from 1885 to 1903.

== Life ==
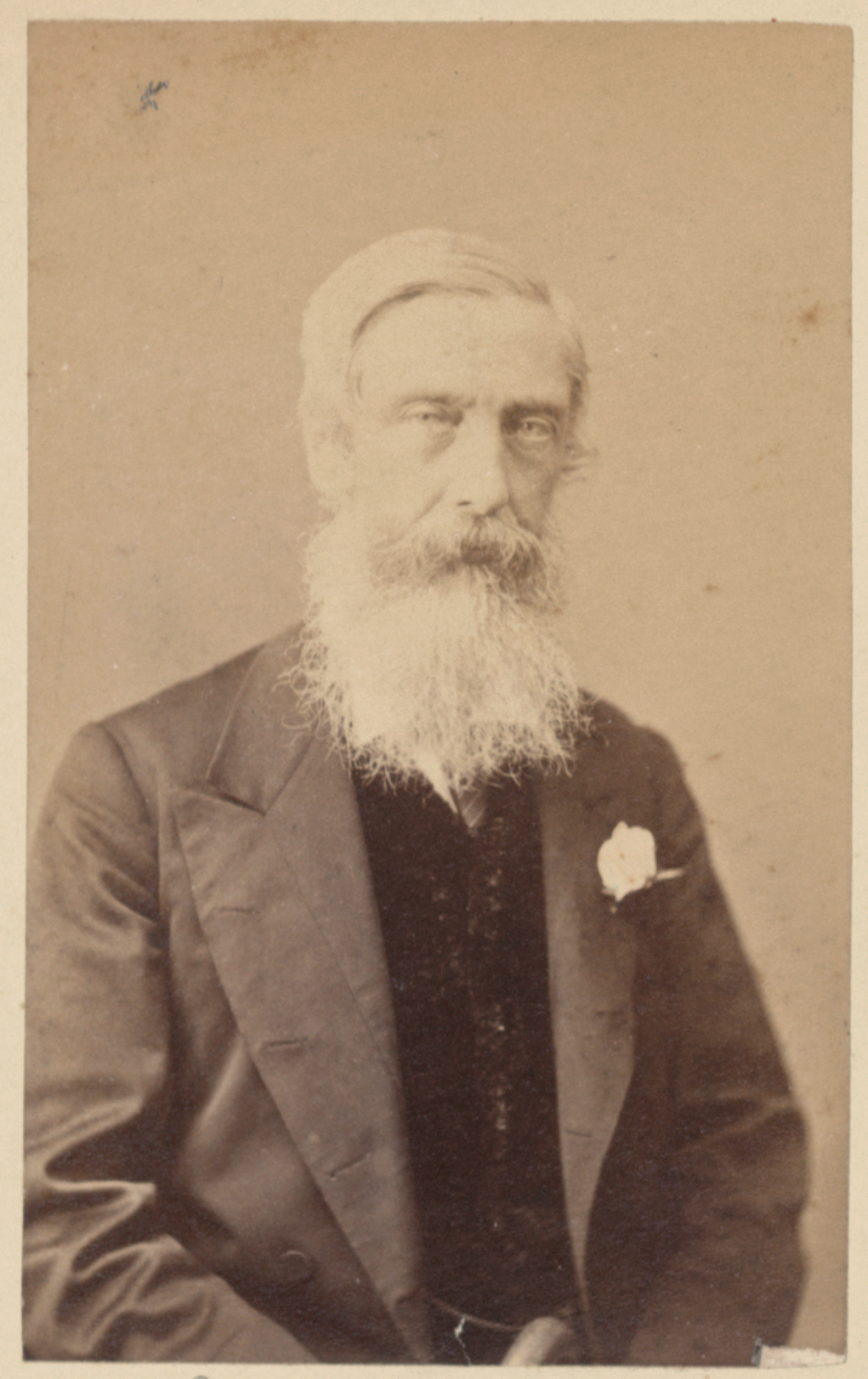
William Muir during the Second Anglo-Afghan War

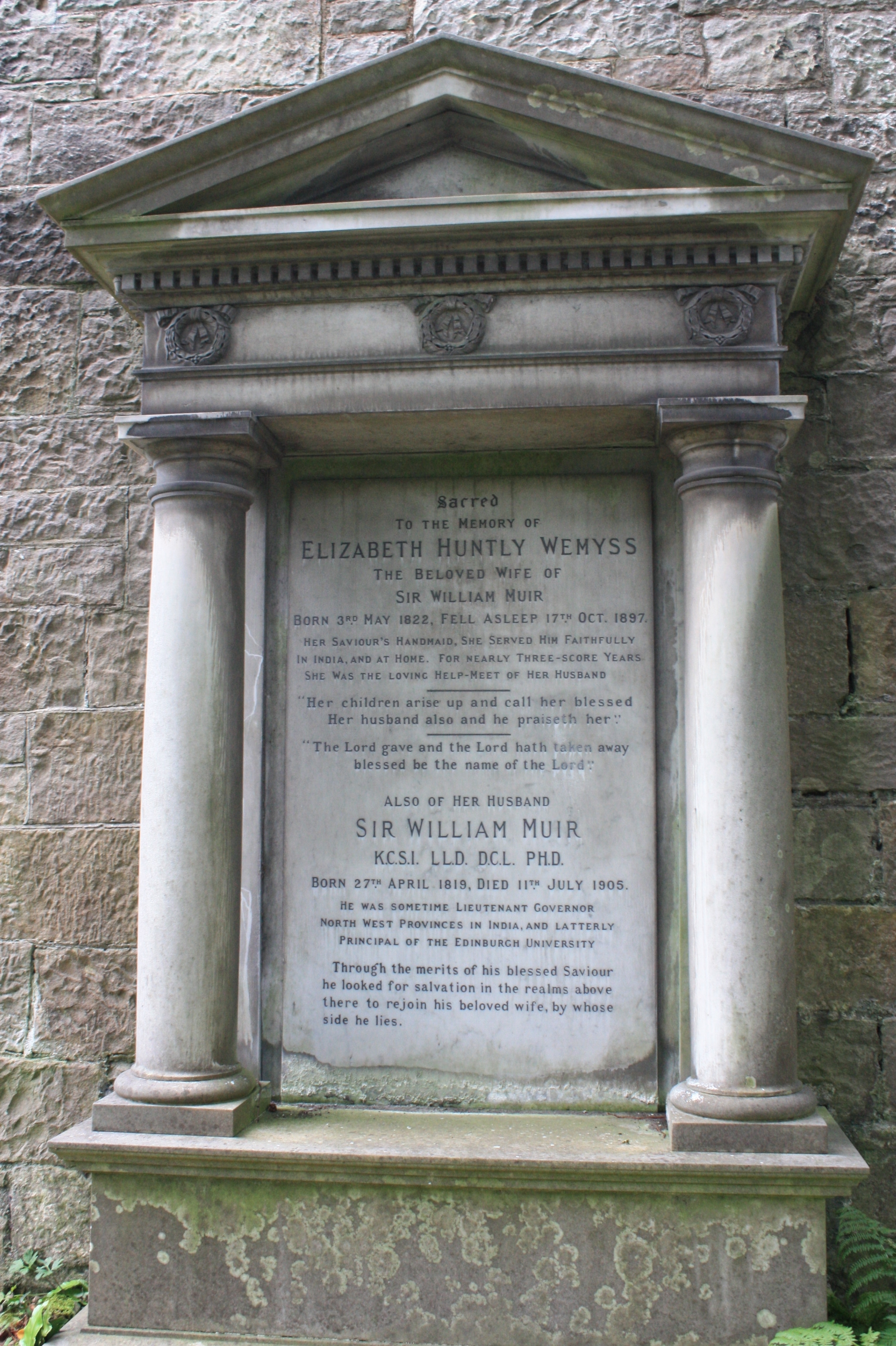
William Muir's grave, Dean Cemetery

He was born at Glasgow, the son of William Muir (1783–1820), a merchant, and Helen Macfie (1784–1866). His older brother was John Muir, the Indologist and Sanskrit scholar. He was educated at Kilmarnock Academy, the universities of Glasgow and Edinburgh, and Haileybury College. In 1837 he entered the Bengal civil service. Muir served as secretary to the governor of the North-West Provinces, and as a member of the Agra revenue board, and during the Mutiny he was in charge of the intelligence department there. In 1865 he was made foreign secretary to the Indian Government. In 1867 Muir was knighted (K.C.S.I.), and in 1868 he became lieutenant-governor of the North Western Provinces.

Having been criticised for the poor relief effort during the Orissa famine of 1866, the British began to discuss famine policy, and in 1868 Muir issued an order stating that:

... every District officer would be held personally responsible that no deaths occurred from starvation which could have been avoided by any exertion or arrangement on his part or that of his subordinates.

In 1874 Muir was appointed financial member of the Viceroy's Council, and retired in 1876, when he became a member of the Council of India in London. James Thomason served as Muir's mentor with respect to Imperial administration; Muir later wrote an influential biography of Thomason.

Muir had always taken an interest in educational matters, and it was chiefly through his exertions that the central college at Allahabad, known as Muir Central College, was built and endowed. Muir College later became a part of the University of Allahabad. In 1884 Muir was elected president of the Royal Asiatic Society. In 1885 he was elected principal of the University of Edinburgh in succession to Sir Alexander Grant, and held the post till 1903, when he retired.

On 7 February 1840, he married Elizabeth Huntly (1822–1897), daughter of James Wemyss, collector of Cawnpore, and together they had 15 children. He died in Edinburgh, and is buried in Dean Cemetery. The grave lies in the concealed lower southern terrace.

== Works, reception, and legacy ==
Muir was a scholar of Islam. His chief area of expertise was the history of the time of Muhammad and the early caliphate. His chief books are A Life of Mahomet and History of Islam to the Era of the Hegira; Annals of the Early Caliphate; The Caliphate: Its rise, decline and fall, an abridgment and continuation of the Annals, which brings the record down to the fall of the caliphate on the onset of the Mongols; The Koran: its Composition and Teaching; and The Mohammedan Controversy, a reprint of five essays published at intervals between 1885 and 1887. In 1888 he delivered the Rede lecture at Cambridge on The Early Caliphate and Rise of Islam.

=== Life of Mahomet ===
His original book A Life of Mahomet and History of Islam to the Era of the Hegira was initially published 1861 in four volumes. The book received attention in both literary and missionary circles, and provoked responses ranging from appreciation to criticism.

Contemporary reviewers of Muir's Life of Mahomet uniformly praised him for his knowledge of Arabic. The only competing work in Britain at the time was a book by Harrow schoolmaster Reginald Bosworth Smith, who had no Arabic language skills. The work was also praised by Christian missionaries who welcomed it as an aid to convert Muslims.

Contemporary historian E. A. Freeman praised the book as a "great work", yet questioned its conjectural methodology, particularly Muir's suggestion that Muhammad was inspired by Satan. Contemporary Aloys Sprenger also criticized Muir for ascribing Islam's origins to "the Devil". The British Quarterly Review of 1872 criticized his approach as "he is treading ground whither the historian of events and creeds must refuse to follow him".

In 1870, the Indian Muslim intellectual Syed Ahmad Khan wrote A Series of Essays on the Life of Mohammed, and Subjects Subsidiary Thereto, a significant rebuttal to Muir's book. Khan praised Muir's writing talent and familiarity with Oriental literature, but criticized Muir's reliance on weak sources like al-Waqidi. He accused Muir of misrepresenting the facts and writing with animus. Written objections to this aspect of Life could be found in the writings of Muslims living inside British India only after the Indian Rebellion of 1857, an unsuccessful uprising against the East India Company.

Later reviews of the work have also been mixed, with many scholars describing Muir's work as polemical. W. Montgomery Watt (1961) described Muir's Life as following "in detail the standard Muslim accounts, though not uncritically". Mohammed Hussein Heikal regarded Muir's work as an argumentum ad hominem fallacy. Albert Hourani (1980) said Muir's writing, while "still not quite superseded", regarded Muhammad as "the Devil's instrument" and Muslim society as "barren and bound to remain so". Aaron W. Hughes (2012) writes that Muir's work was part of a European Orientalist tradition that sought to show that Islam was "a corruption, a garbled version of existing monotheisms". Bennett (1998) praises it as "a detailed life of Muhammad more complete than almost any other previous book, at least in English," noting however that besides "placing the facts of Muhammad's life before both Muslim and Christian readers, Muir wanted to convince Muslims that Muhammad was not worth their allegiance. He thus combined scholarly and evangelical or missionary purposes." Commenting on Muir's conjecture that Muhammad may have been affected by a Satanic influence, Clinton Bennett says that Muir "chose to resurrect another old Christian theory", and quotes the following passage from Muir's 1858 Life, vol. 2:

It is incumbent upon us to consider this question from a Christian point of view, and to ask whether the supernatural influence, which ... acted upon the soul of the Arabian prophet may not have proceeded from the Evil One ... Our belief in the power of the Evil One must lead us to consider this as at least one of the possible causes of the fall of Mahomet... into the meshes of deception ... May we conceive that a diabolical influence and inspiration was permitted to enslave the heart of him who had deliberately yielded to the compromise with evil.

In the final chapters of Life, Muir concluded that the main legacy of Islam was a negative one, and he subdivided it in "three radical evils":

First: Polygamy, Divorce, and Slavery strike at the root of public morals, poison domestic life, and disorganise society; while the Veil removes the female sex from its just position and influence in the world. Second: freedom of thought and private judgment are crushed and annihilated. Toleration is unknown, and the possibility of free and liberal institutions foreclosed. Third: a barrier has been interposed against the reception of Christianity.

According to Edward Said, although Muir's Life of Mahomet and The Caliphate "are still considered reliable monuments of scholarship", his work was characterized by an "impressive antipathy to the Orient, Islam and the Arabs", and "his attitude towards his subject matter was fairly put by him when he said that 'the sword of Muhammed, and the Kor'an, are the most stubborn enemies of Civilisation, Liberty, and the Truth which the world has yet known'". Daniel Martin Varisco rejects Said's assessment that Muir's Life was considered reliable by the 1970s. He writes "Serious historians had long since relegated Muir's work to the rare-books sections of their libraries."

=== Other works ===
Muir's later Annals was received with fewer reservations by the Times reviewer and other newspapers of the day. It was the Annals that established Muir's reputation as a leading scholar on Islam in Britain. Nevertheless, his earlier hypercritical Life of Mahomet was used as a poster child by contemporary Muslim commentators—especially by Indian ones connected to the movement of Syed Ahmed Khan—to dismiss all criticism of their society emanating from Western scholars. Syed Ameer Ali went as far as to declare Muir "Islam's avowed enemy".

An illustrative aspect in the evolution of Muir's positions is his stance on the Crusades. In his writings of the 1840s, he goaded Christian scholars to verbal warfare against Muslims using aggressive crusader imagery. Fifty year later, Muir redirected the invective hitherto reserved for the Muslims to the crusading leaders and armies, and while still finding some faults with the former, he praised Saladin for knightly values. (Muir's anti-Catholic animus may have played a role in this too.) Despite his later writings, Muir's reputation as an unfair critic of Islam remained strong in Muslim circles. Powell finds that William Muir deserves much of the criticism laid by Edward Said and his followers against 19th-century Western scholarship on Islam.

Muir was a committed Evangelical Christian and was invited to preface many missionary biographies and memoirs, speak at conferences and to publicise Zenana missions. He wrote "If Christianity is anything, it must be everything. It cannot brook a rival, nor cease to wage war against all other faiths, without losing its strength and virtue." In his official capacity as principal of Edinburgh University, Muir chaired many meetings of Evangelists at the university, organised to support overseas missionary efforts, and addressed by speakers such as Henry Drummond. In India, William Muir founded the Indian Christian village Muirabad, near Allahabad. Muir was impressed with the discovery of the Apology of al-Kindy; he lectured on it at the Royal Asiatic Society, presenting it as an important link in what he saw as a chain of notable conversions to Christianity, and later he published the translated sources. A proselytising text, Bakoorah shahiya (Sweet First Fruits) was published under his name as well, but this work had actually been written by a convert to Protestantism from Eastern Orthodox Christianity.

In The Mohammedan Controversy, he wrote:

Britain must not faint until her millions in the East abandon both the false prophet and the idol shrines and rally around that eternal truth which has been brought to light in the Gospel.

Daniel Pipes investigated the origin of the phrase "Satanic Verses", and concluded that despite Salman Rushdie's claim that he had borrowed the phrase from Tabari, the earliest traceable occurrence is in Muir's Life of Mohamet (1858) in a passage discussing "two Satanic verses". However, the phrase does not appear in the revised edition of 1912.

== Statuary ==
A marble statue by George Blackall Simmonds was erected in his honour and unveiled by the then Viceroy of India at the opening of Muir College on 8 April 1886, and was still there in 2012. Another was proposed for the Muslim college, but due to opposition the scheme was dropped.

Arms of Sir William Muir

== Family ==
He was the brother of the indologist John Muir. He married Elizabeth Huntly Wemyss in 1840 (died 1897), and had five sons and six daughters; four of his sons served in India, and one of them, Colonel A. M. Muir (died 1899), was Political Officer for South Baluchistan, and was acting British Resident in Nepal when he died. One daughter, Jane, married Colonel Andrew Wauchope and lived at Edinburgh Castle. One of his sons-in-law was the civil servant William Henry Lowe.

== Publications ==
- The Life of Mahomet [Muhammad] and History of Islam to the Era of the Hegira
  - Vols. 1–2 (published in 1858) by Smith, Elder, & Co.
  - Vols. 3–4 (published in 1861) by Smith, Elder, & Co. together with a reprinting of the first two volumes; title shortened to The Life of Muhammad.
- The Life of Mahomet [Mohammad] from original sources
  - 2nd abridged one-volume ed. of the above (published in 1878), xi+errata slip, xxviii, 624 pp. London: Smith, Elder, & Co.
  - 3rd abridged ed. (published in 1894) by Smith, Elder, & Co., ciii, 536 p.
  - posthumously revised ed. by Thomas Hunter Weir published in (1912) as The life of Mohammad from original sources, cxix, 556 pp.
- The Opium Revenue (1875)
- The Coran: Its Composition and Teaching (1878)
- The Apology of al-Kindy (1882)
- Annals of the Early Caliphate (1883)
- The Rise and Decline of Islam (1883)
- Mahomet [Muhammad] and Islam: A Sketch of the Prophet's Life (1887)
- The Caliphate: Its Rise, Decline and Fall (1891; revised ed. 1915)
- Sweet First-Fruits. A tale of the Nineteenth Century, on the truth and virtue of the Christian Religion (trans. 1893)
- The Beacon of Truth; or, Testimony of the Coran to the Truth of the Christian Religion (1894)
- The Mameluke or Slave Dynasty of Egypt, 1260–1517 AD, end of the Caliphate (1896)
- Agra in the Mutiny: And the Family Life of W. & E. H. Muir in the Fort, 1857 : a Sketch for Their Children (1896). 59 pp. Privately published.
- James Thomason, lieutenant-governor N.-W. P., India (1897)
- The Mohammedan Controversy (1897)
- The Sources of Islam, A Persian Treatise, by the Rev. W. St. Clair-Tisdall, translated and abridged by W. M. (1901). Edinburgh, T & T Clark.
- Two Old Faiths: Essays on the Religions of the Hindus and the Mohammedans. J. Murray Mitchell and Sir William Muir. (1901). New York: Chautauqua Press.
- Records of the Intelligence Department of the Government of the North-West Provinces of India during the Mutiny of 1857 including correspondence with the supreme government, Delhi, Cawnpore, and other places. (1902). 2 vols, Edinburgh, T & T Clark.
- The Lord's Supper: an abiding witness to the death of Christ (nd)

== See also ==
- Orientalism
- Origin and development of the Qur'an

== Notes ==
- Ali, Kecia (2014). The Lives of Muhammad. Harvard University Press. p. 48ff. ISBN 9780674744486.
- Ansari, K. Humayun. "The Muslim World in British Historical Imaginations: 'Re-thinking Orientalism'?" British Journal of Middle Eastern Studies (2011) 38#1 pp: 73-93
- Bennett, Clinton (1998). In search of Muhammad. Continuum International Publishing Group. ISBN 978-0-304-70401-9.
- Esposito, John L. (2003). The Oxford dictionary of Islam. Oxford University Press. p. 563. ISBN 978-0-19-512558-0.
- Kuortti, Joel (1997). Place of the sacred: the rhetoric of the Satanic verses affair. Peter Lang. p. 116. ISBN 978-0-8204-3294-6.
- Muir, William (1858). The life of Mahomet and history of Islam, to the era of the Hegira: with introductory chapters on the original sources for the biography of Mahomet, and on the pre-Islamite history of Arabia, Volume 2. Smith, Elder & Co. p. 152.
- Pipes, Daniel (2003) [first edition: 1990]. The Rushdie affair: the novel, the Ayatollah, and the West (2 ed.). Transaction Publishers. p. 115. ISBN 978-0-7658-0996-4.
- Powell, Avril A. (2010). Scottish orientalists and India: the Muir brothers, religion, education and empire. Boydell & Brewer. ISBN 978-1-84383-579-0.

Attribution:

Government offices
Preceded by Edmund Drummond	Lieutenant Governor of the North-Western Provinces; 1868–1874	Succeeded by Sir John Strachey
Academic offices
Preceded by Sir Alexander Grant	Principal of Edinburgh University; 1885–1903	Succeeded by William Turner
