= Henry Binny Webster =

Inspector General of the Indian Police

Henry Binny Webster was Inspector General of the Indian Police. From 1863 to 1866 he was joint magistrate and Collector in the district of Bulandshahr, North-Western Provinces. He is credited with supervising the erection of the English school in 1864 and the dispensary in 1867, in the town of Bulandshahr. His predecessors included George Dundas Turnbull and Charles Currie.

Webster entered Haileybury in 1852, left the following year and arrived in India in 1854. In 1879 he was appointed commissioner at Jhansi, and two years later became inspector general of the Indian Police.
