= Henry Dundas Willock =

Henry D. Willock
- Born: 25 December 1830
- Died: 1903 (aged 72–73)

Henry Dundas Willock, also referred to as Henry Davis Willock (25 December 1830-1903) was a British Civil Servant in India. He was joint magistrate at Allahabad during the Indian Rebellion of 1857.
