= George Dundas Turnbull =

- Born: c.1821
- Died: October 1914
- Occupation(s): District Collector of Bulandshahr; Judge at Meerut and Allahabad

George Dundas Turnbull (c.1821 – October 1914), was a Collector of the district of Bulandshahr from May 1852 to 21 April 1857, and judge at Meerut and Allahabad, India. He was succeeded by Brand Sapte.

Turnbull left Haileybury in 1838 and arrived in India the following year.

== See also ==
- Rivers Turnbull
- List of administrators of Bulandshahr
