= Frederick Pollen =

British civil servant of the Indian Civil Service (ICS)

- Born: 1847
- Died: 11 February 1876 (aged 28–29); Bulandshahr, India
- Occupation: District Collector at Bulandshahr

Frederick Pollen (1847 - 11 February 1876) was a British District Collector at Bulandshahr, India. He had been a student at Dublin University, and passed the examination for the Indian Civil Service and Home Civil Service in first class in 1867, taking 13th place. In 1869 he was assistant magistrate and collector at Meerut. He married Emily Charlotte (née Patrick). The old District Gazetteer of Bulandshahr is largely based on his work, along with Kuar Lachman Singh, and on the settlement report by R. G. Currie. Pollen died in Bulandshahr on 11 February 1876, at the age of 29.

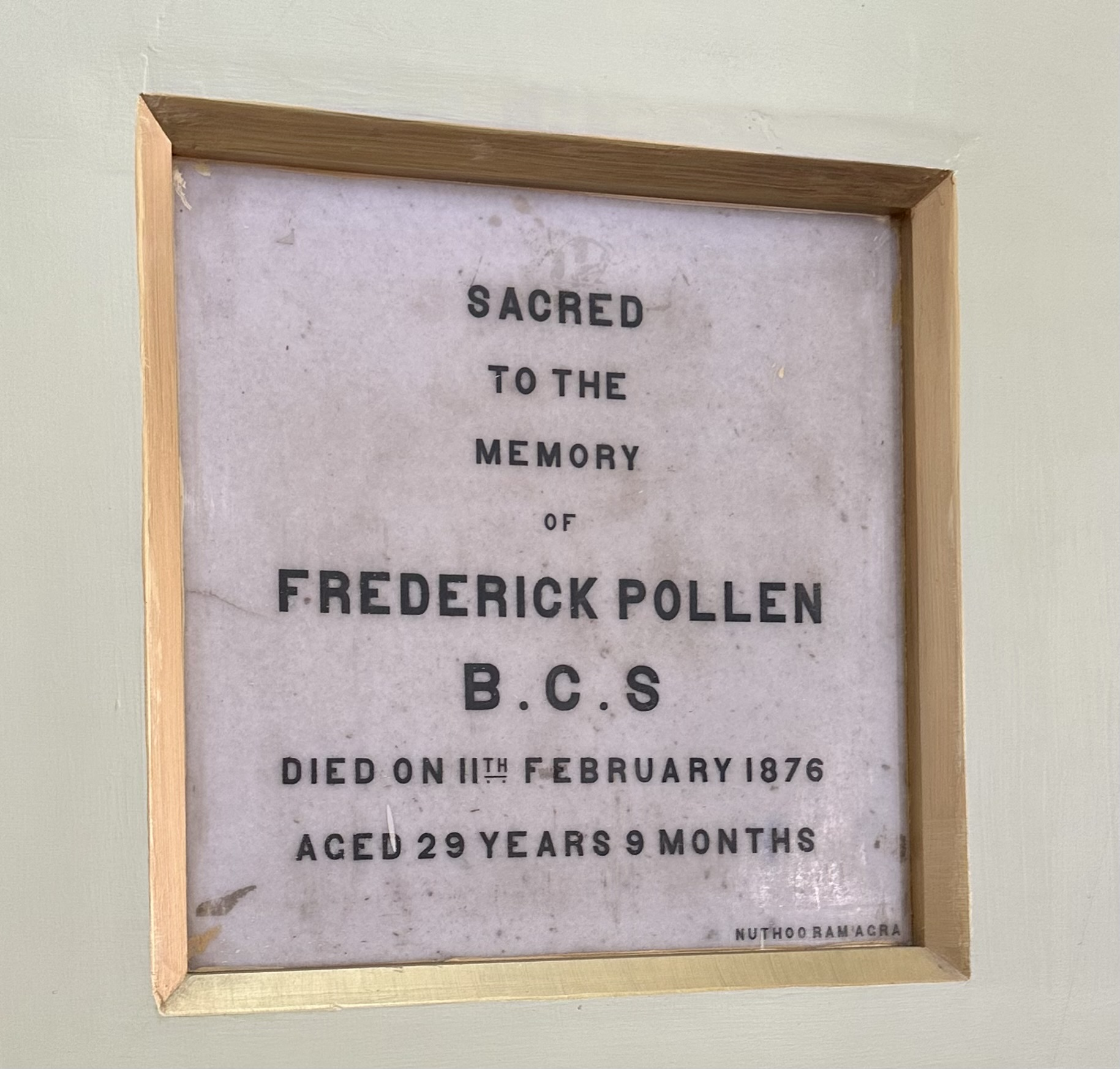
Frederick Pollen, All Saints Church, Bulandshahr
