= Shikarpur, Bulandshahr =

Shikarpur
- Town
- Location in Uttar Pradesh, India Shikarpur (India)
- Coordinates: 28°16′53″N 78°00′39″E
- Country: India
- State: Uttar Pradesh
- District: Bulandshahr

Government
  - Type: Democratic
- Elevation: 191 m (627 ft)

Population (2011)
  - Total: 33,130

Languages
  - Official: Hindi
- Time zone: UTC+5:30 (IST)
- Vehicle registration: UP-13

Shikarpur is a town and a municipal board in Bulandshahr district in the Indian state of Uttar Pradesh.

== History ==
Shikarpur, formerly known as Govindpur Kantian, was founded and held by Gaur Brahmins of Chaudhary title. During the Ghori invasion of India, Gaurs were ousted by Tagas (sub-caste of Gaur Brahmins), but Gaur Chaudhari's subsequently recovered their estate only to be again ousted by Shaikh Mansur, a Muhammadan chief. Mansur invited the Gaur Chaudhuris for feast told the Gaurs about his good intentions when the Chaudhary and his relatives settle for the feast Mansur killed all of them barbarously from behind with his soldier. Pandit Nanak Chand son of the murdered Chaudhary revenged his father and relatives' death by slaying Shaikh and his army with the help of other Gaur brahmin zamindars of Bulandshahr and captured the land former had Usurped.

== Demographics ==
The provisional data for the 2011 Census of India recorded Shikarpur as having a population of 33,130. Males constituted 52.77% of the population and females 47.22%. The average literacy rate of 65.37% was lower than the national average, with male literacy at 74.68% and female literacy at 55.68%. In Shikarpur, 17.5% of the population was then under six years of age.
