= Bulandshahr district =

Coordinates: 28°25′N 77°50′E

- District of Uttar Pradesh
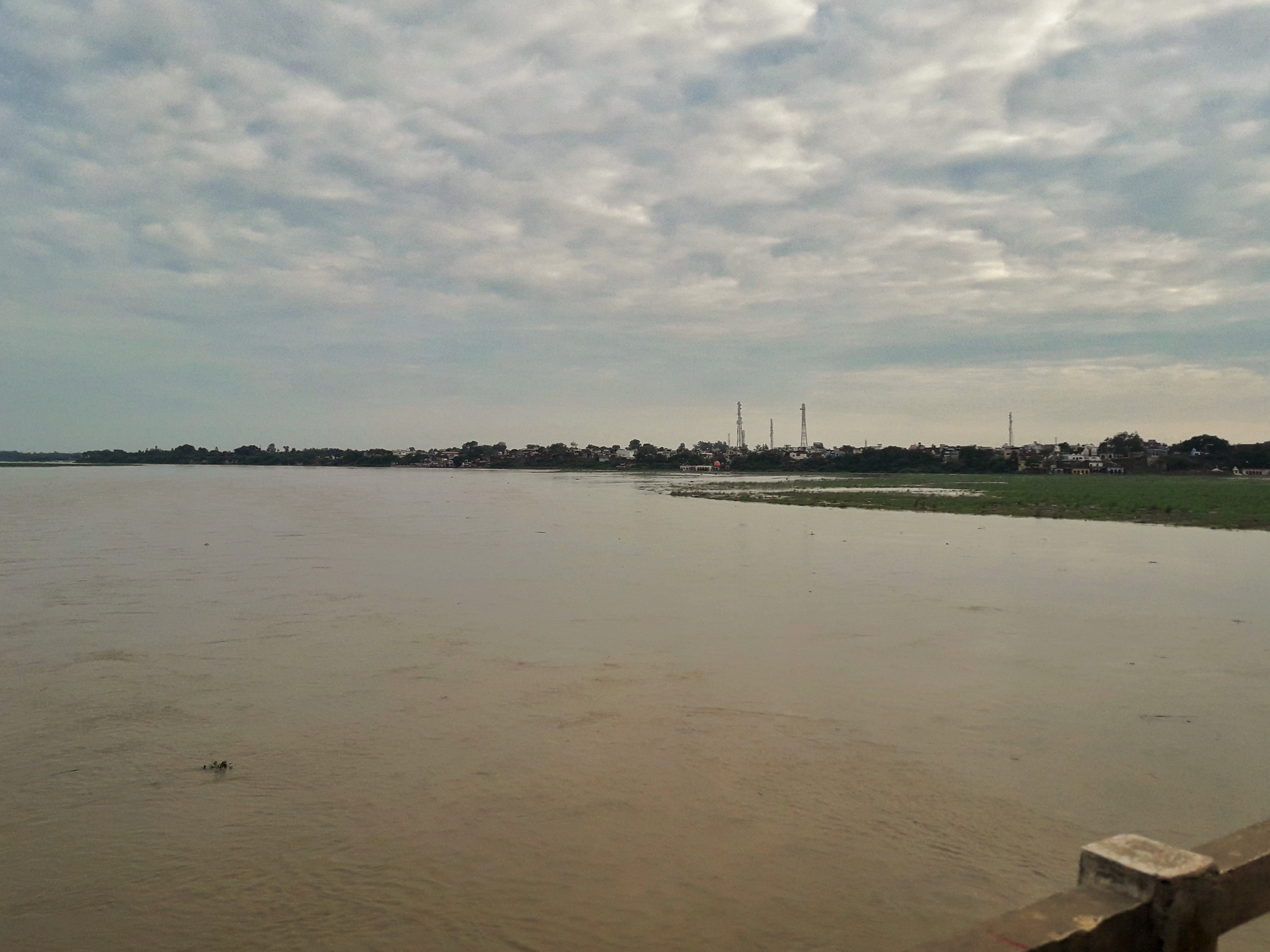
- Ganga River at Anupshahr

- Location of Bulandshahr district in Uttar Pradesh
- Country: India
- State: Uttar Pradesh
- Division: Meerut
- Headquarters: Bulandshahr
- Tehsils: Bulandshahr, Syana, Anoopshahr, Shikarpur, Khurja, Dibai, Sikandrabad

Government
  - Lok Sabha constituencies: Bulandshahr

Area
  - Total: 4,441 km^{2} (1,715 sq mi)

Population (2011)
  - Total: 3,499,171
  - Density: 787.9/km^{2} (2,041/sq mi)
  - Urban: 867,429

Demographics
  - Literacy: 75.23 per cent
  - Sex ratio: 892
- Time zone: UTC+05:30 (IST)
- Major highways: National Highway 91
- Website: bulandshahar.nic.in

Bulandshahr district (also spelled Bulandshahar) is a district in the Meerut region in the north Indian state of Uttar Pradesh (UP), situated between the Ganga and Yamuna rivers. It is a part of the Delhi National Capital Region of India, and Bulandshahr is the district headquarters.

The district is situated between 28.4° south and 28.0° north latitudes and between 77.0° and 78.0° east longitudes. It is bordered by Hapur district to the north, Amroha and Sambhal districts to the east, Aligarh district to the south and Gautam Buddha Nagar district to the west.

== Demographics ==
Historical population
Year	Pop.	±% p.a.
1901	939,586	—
1911	927,761	−0.13%
1921	881,448	−0.51%
1931	939,944	+0.64%
1941	1,089,311	+1.49%
1951	1,241,139	+1.31%
1961	1,427,433	+1.41%
1971	1,690,092	+1.70%
1981	2,110,285	+2.25%
1991	2,547,750	+1.90%
2001	3,009,860	+1.68%
2011	3,499,171	+1.52%

Religions in Bulandshahr district (2011)
Religion	Percent
Hinduism	77.37%
Islam	22.22%
Other or not stated	0.41%
Distribution of religions

According to the 2011 census, Bulandshahr district had a population of 3,499,171, roughly equal to the nation of Lithuania or the US state of Connecticut. This makes it the 85th most populous district of the total 640. The district has a population density of 788 inhabitants per square kilometre (2,040/sq mi). Its population growth rate over the decade 2001-2011 was 20.09%. Bulandshahr has a sex ratio of 892 females for every 1000 males, and a literacy rate of 76.23%. 24.79% of the population lived in urban areas. Scheduled Castes make up 20.74% of the population.

In 1901, the population stood at 1,138,101.

Languages of Bulandshahr district (2011)
1. Hindi (93.2%)
2. Urdu (6.58%)
3. Other (0.19%)

At the time of the 2011 Census of India, 93.23% of the population in the district spoke Hindi and 6.58% Urdu as their first language.

== Agriculture ==
The district of Bulandshahar is an important grain producing agricultural district. Wheat, potatoes, maize, sugar and many others are cultivated here in large quantities.

== Villages ==
- Chingravthi
