= Raja Balram Singh =

Ruler of Ballabgarh jagir

Raja Balram Singh was the Tewatia Jat ruler of the Ballabhgarh state. He founded the town of Ballabhgarh (or Balramgarh), which was named after him.

== Family ==
Raja Balram Singh Tewatia / Teotia was born to Rao Charandas Tewatia, the brother-in-law of Maharaja Surajmal of Bharatpur. His grandfather, Chaudhary Gopal Singh, was the chief of Sihi, who set up his state by defeating Rajput chief of that area. Chaudhary Gopal Singh became the head of Faridabad pargana in 1710 by concluding a treaty with Mughals. He was succeeded by Chaudhary Charan Das, who stopped paying taxes to Mughals and became renowned in whole Faridabad pargana due to his resistance against Mughals.
