= Sunped =

Village in India

Coordinates: 28.286°N 77.341°E

Sunped is a village in Faridabad district of Haryana in India.

== Location ==
Sunped is a village in Ballabhgarh Tehsil of Haryana. It is located six km south of Ballabhgarh. Western Yamuna Canal flows on its northwest.

== History ==
According to traditional narrators, after the death of great Hindu ruler Prithvirāja III in 1192 AD in the Battle of Tarain, two brothers Raju Rawat and Phool Singh Rawat of Ajmer in Rajasthan came to have a holy bath in Garh Ganga, in Uttar Pradesh. Phool Singh Rawat settled in Bulandshahar District, while Raju Rawat, passing through the Ballabgarh region, ended up overthrowing Abbu Khan Meo and captured his mudfort at Deeg. He then had seven sons from two wives. These seven son settled in 12 different villages which are now known as Rawato ka Barah. Sunped was established by Sonak Rawat.

The village made national headlines after two Dalit children were burned alive with their parents after a feud with a Rajput family. 11 people were initially indicted but were later acquitted.
