= Garden Gate, Bulandshahr =

Building in Bulandshahr, Uttar Pradesh, India

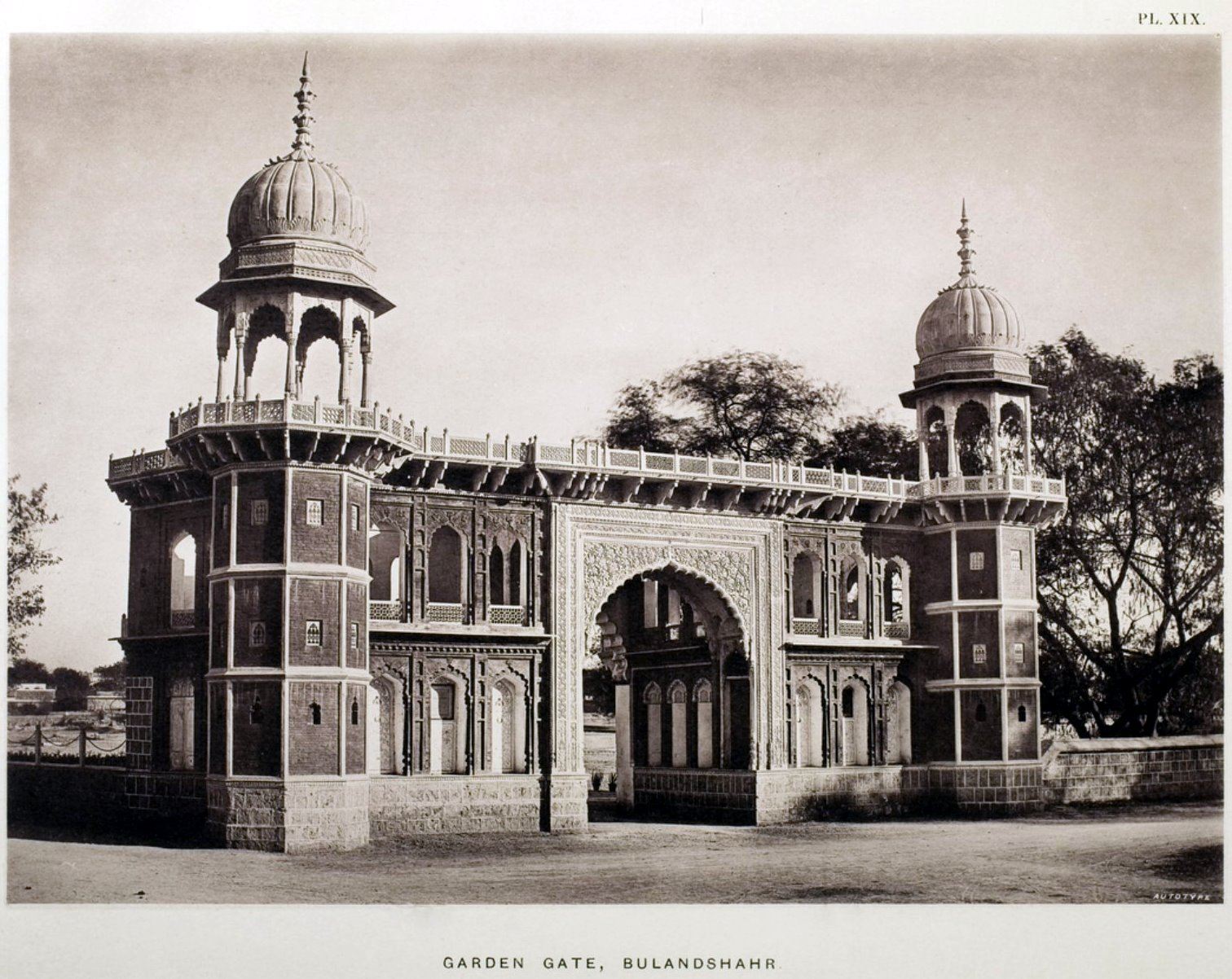
- Garden Gate, Bulandshahr (1880s)
- Interactive map of the Garden Gate, Bulandshahr area

General information
- Coordinates: 28°24′26.8″N 77°51′15.7″E

Garden Gate is a building in Bulandshahr, India, constructed as a gateway to the Bulandshahr public garden, also known as Moti Bagh. It leads to the Town Hall and was built in the late 19th century by Rao Umrao Singh of Kuchesar, who donated a significant fund for its construction. The project was encouraged by Frederic Growse, a British civil servant of the Indian Civil Service, who had been appointed collector of the region in 1878.

== Construction ==
In 1878, Frederic Growse, a British civil servant of the Indian Civil Service, was appointed collector of the district of Bulandshahr. He encouraged projects that involved the use of Indian craft work and was openly critical of the Public Works Department.

Garden gate is one of several gates in Bulandshahr constructed with the encouragement and assistance of Growse. It was built on the site of a former "filthy" drainage ravine and is one of two gates to Moti Bagh, an 11-acre plot of land also known as the Bulandshahr public garden which houses the Town Hall, the other being on the east wall and named for Elliot Colvin. Garden Gate is the main gate towards the west, and is named for Rao Umrao Singh, of Kuchesar, who donated 4,500 rupees towards its construction.

== Structure ==
It consists of an archway, which towards the road is made of white sandstone and is covered with fine tracery. A wide open space was left to its front. The two rooms flanking the archway are made of block-kankar and the corners of octagonal red brick turrets, topped by domed and pinnacled small pavilions 46 feet high and made of stone. One of the rooms contains a spiral staircase. The unroofed upper storey has successive arches to the front, in red brick, and is surmounted by a parapet of white stone posts and panels. It is on the same level as the archway and turrets. A pavilion over the archway was not constructed due to lack of funds. The front facing the garden is much more plain. The doors of the lodges are made from carved wood.

== Purpose ==
Two rooms on either side of the archway were intended for the watchman and gardener. It is the main approach to the Town Hall.

== Response ==
Opposition to the gate was at first dismissed by the assistant judge, but the case lingered on for three years at a cost of nearly 10-times what Rao Umrao Singh paid for it.

== 2023 ==
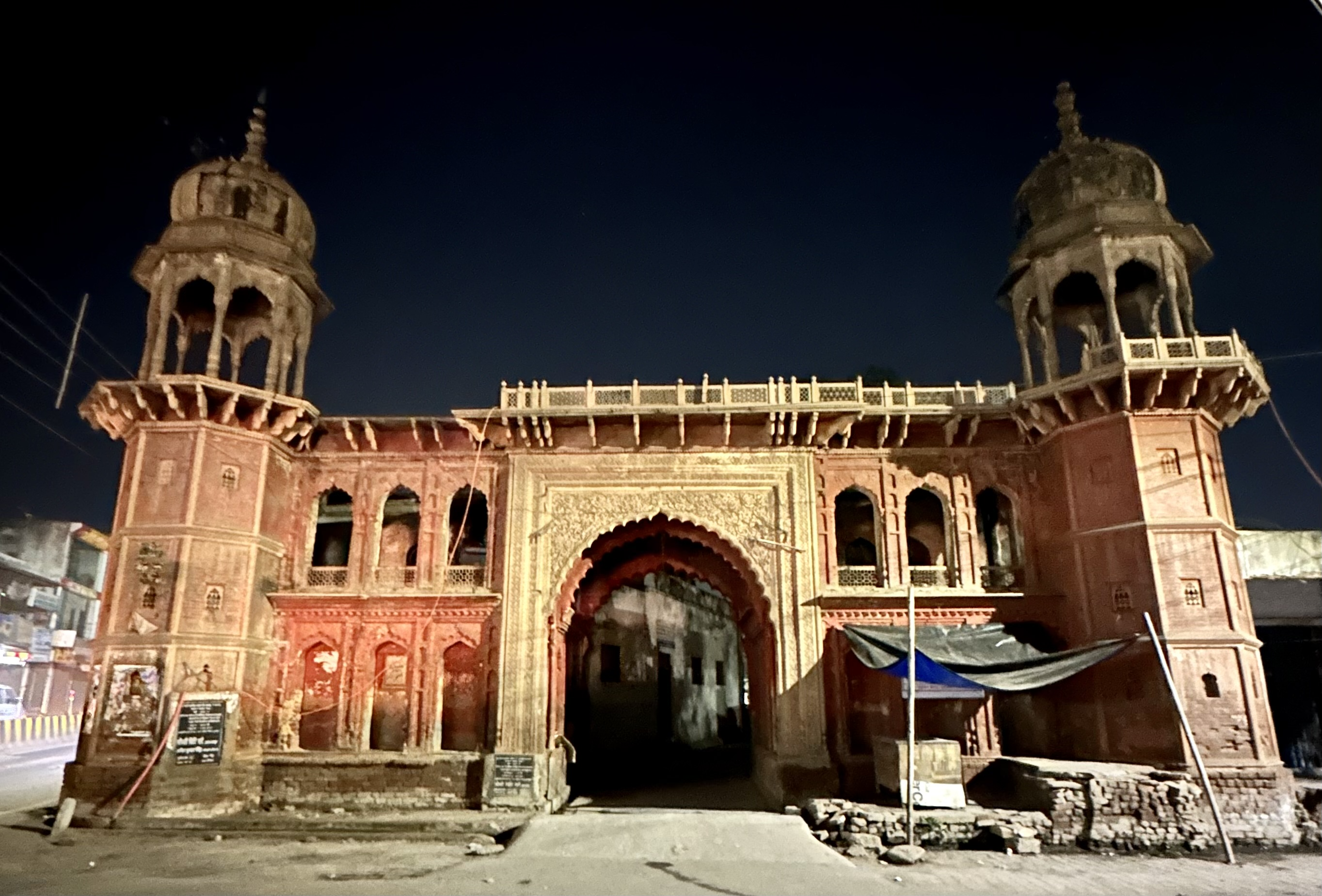
Garden Gate 2023

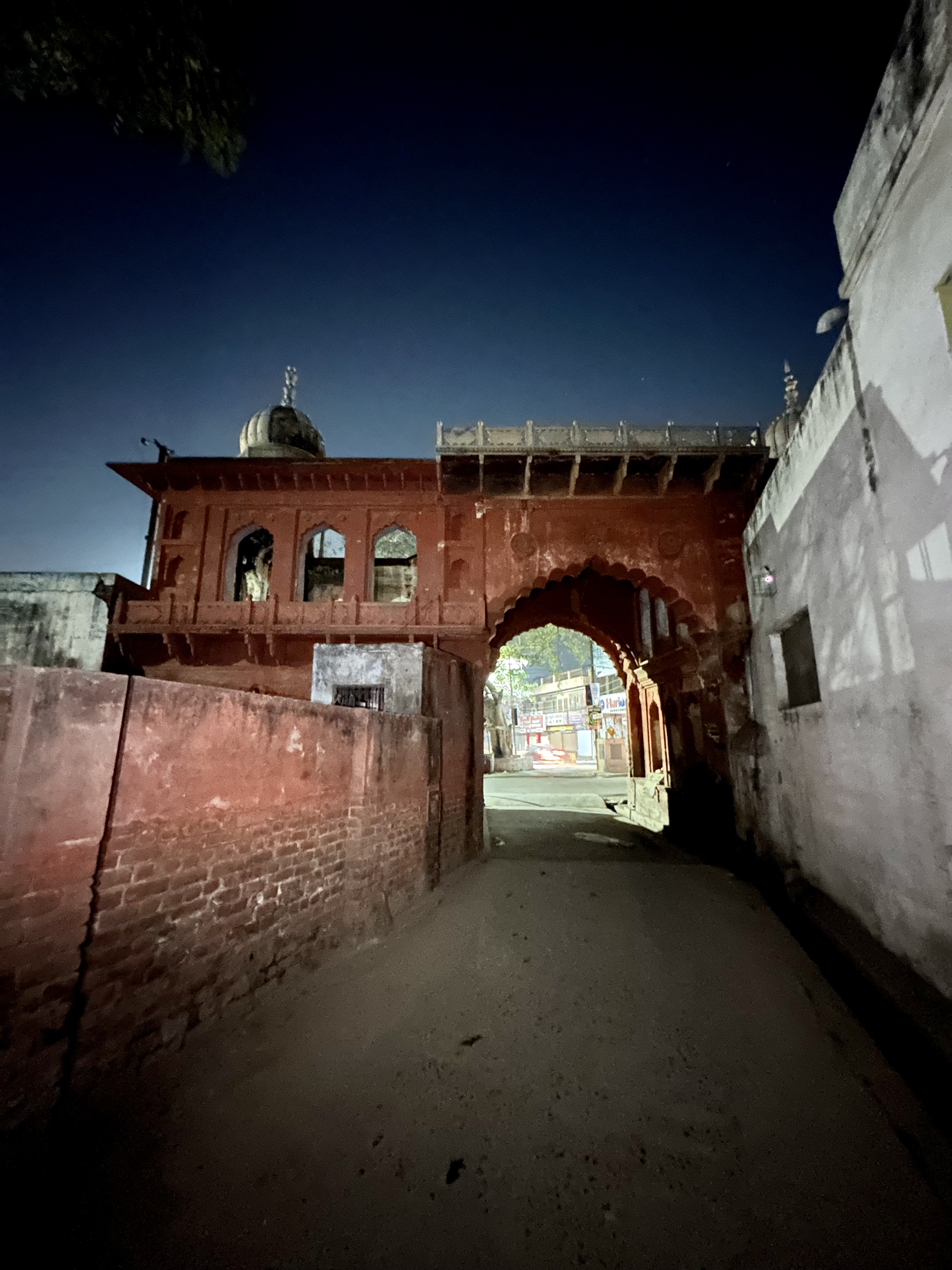
Garden Gate rear view

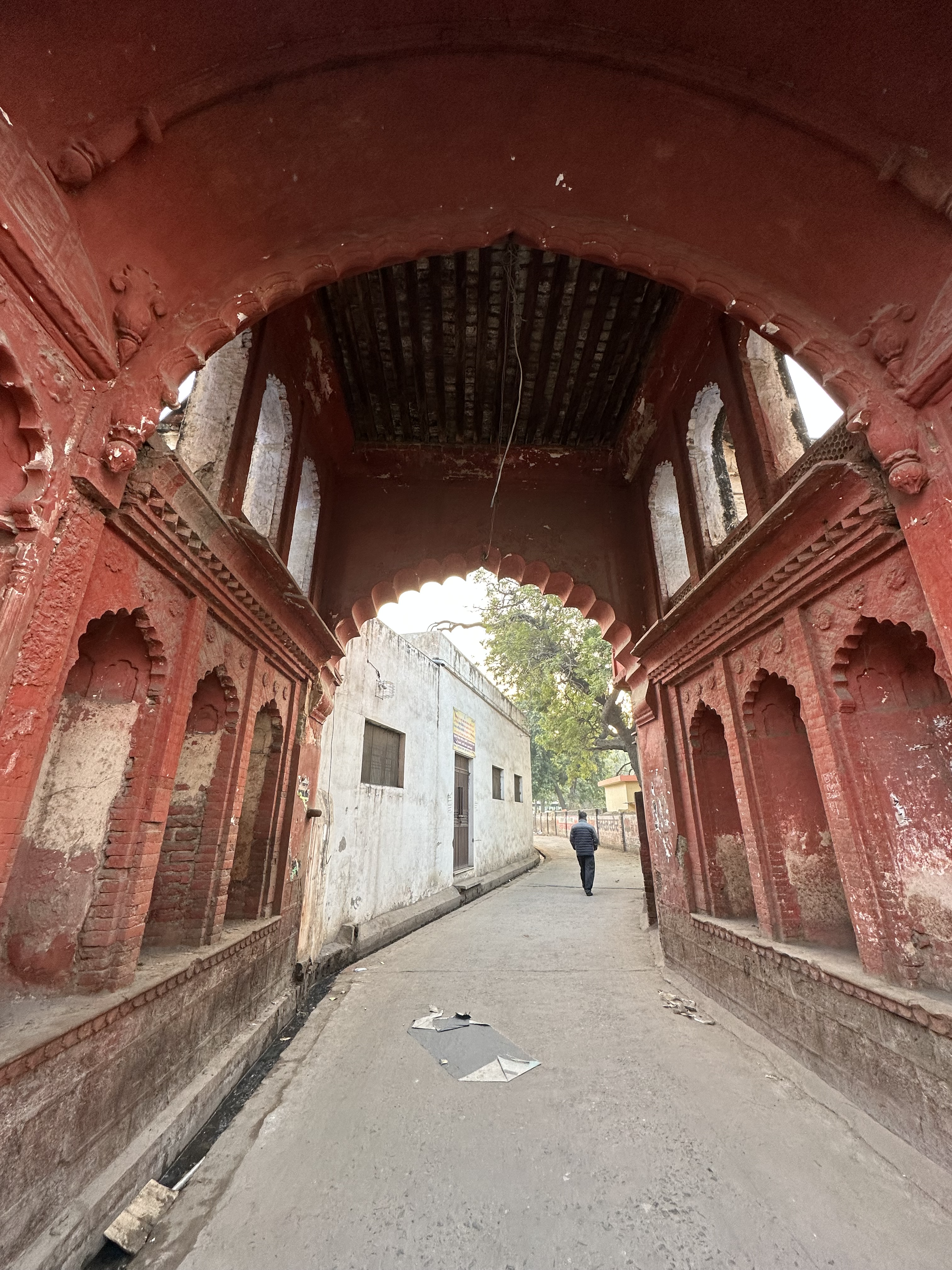
Garden Gate inside arch

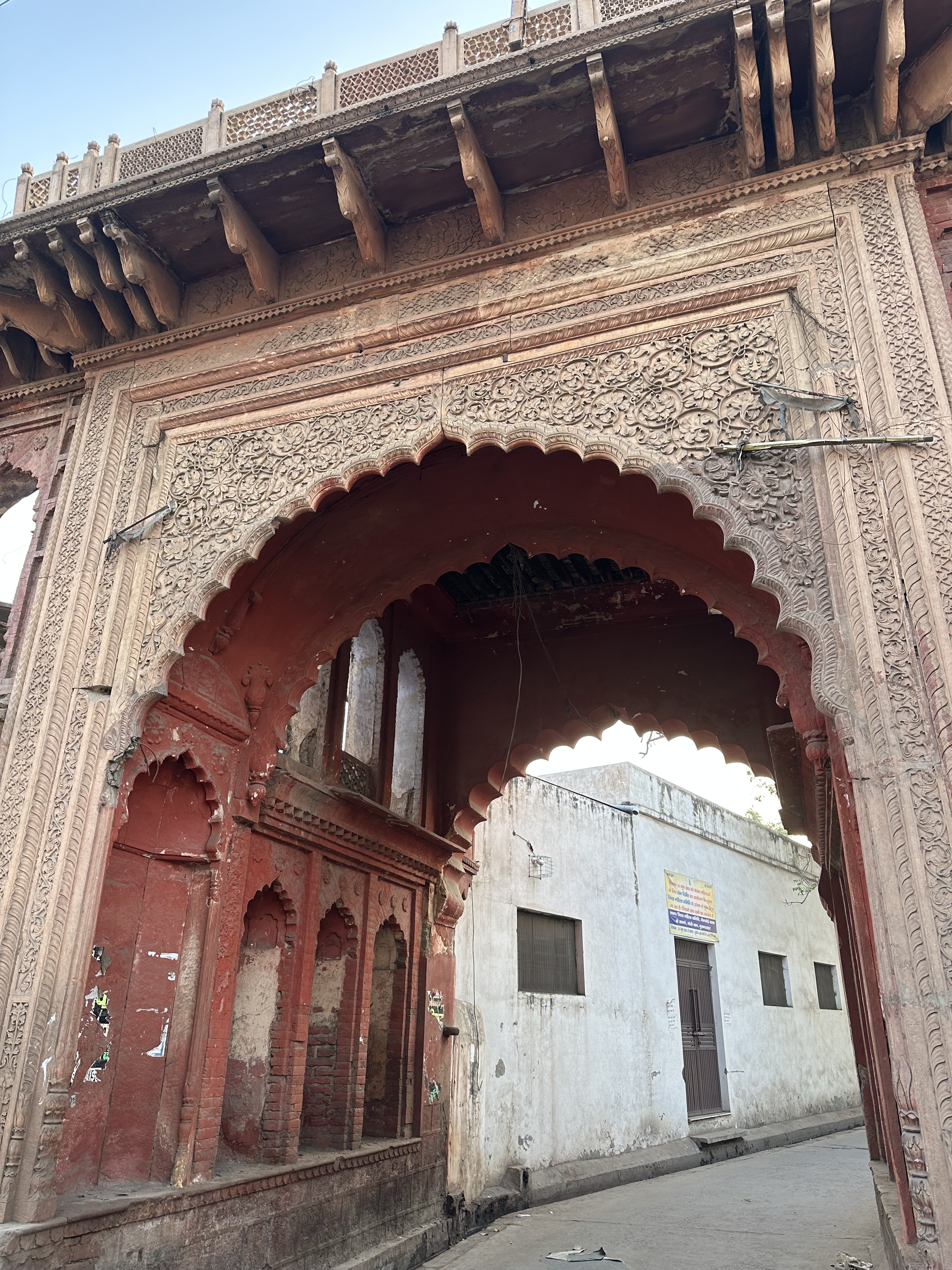
Garden Gate inside arch

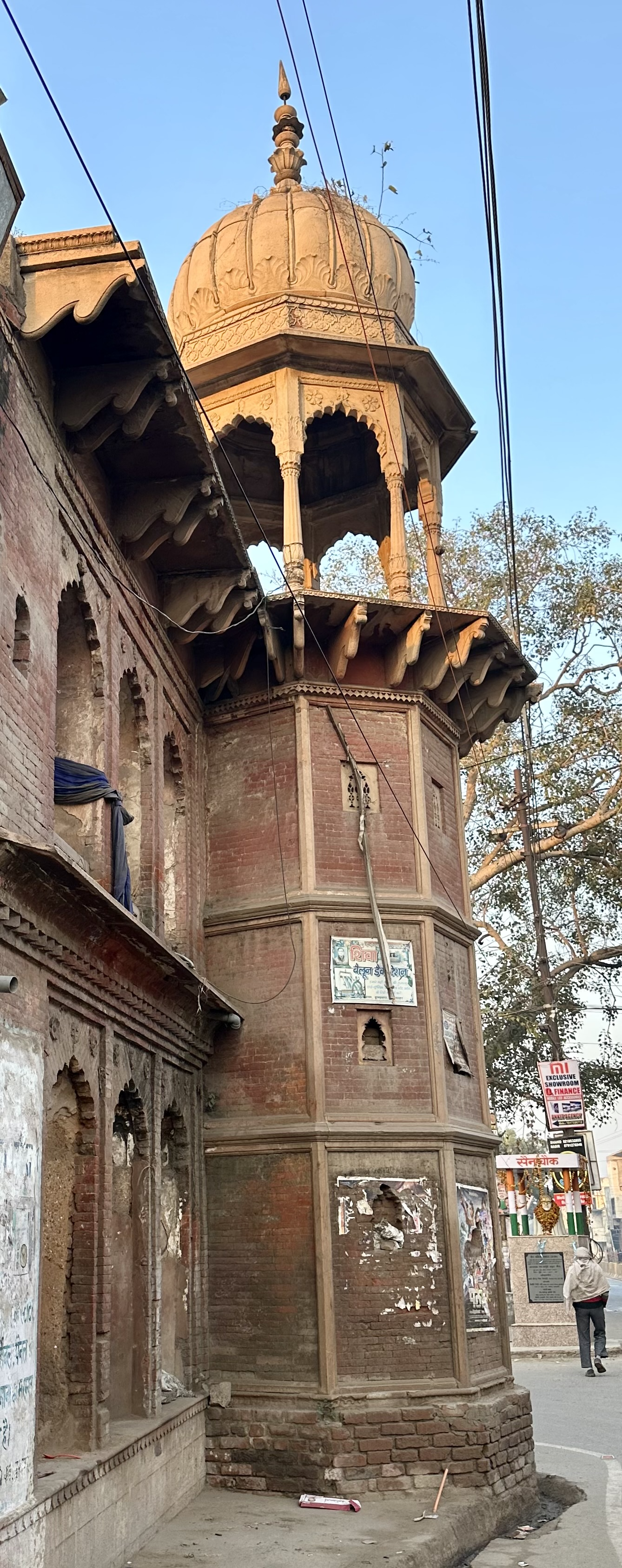
Bulandhar Garden Gate side view

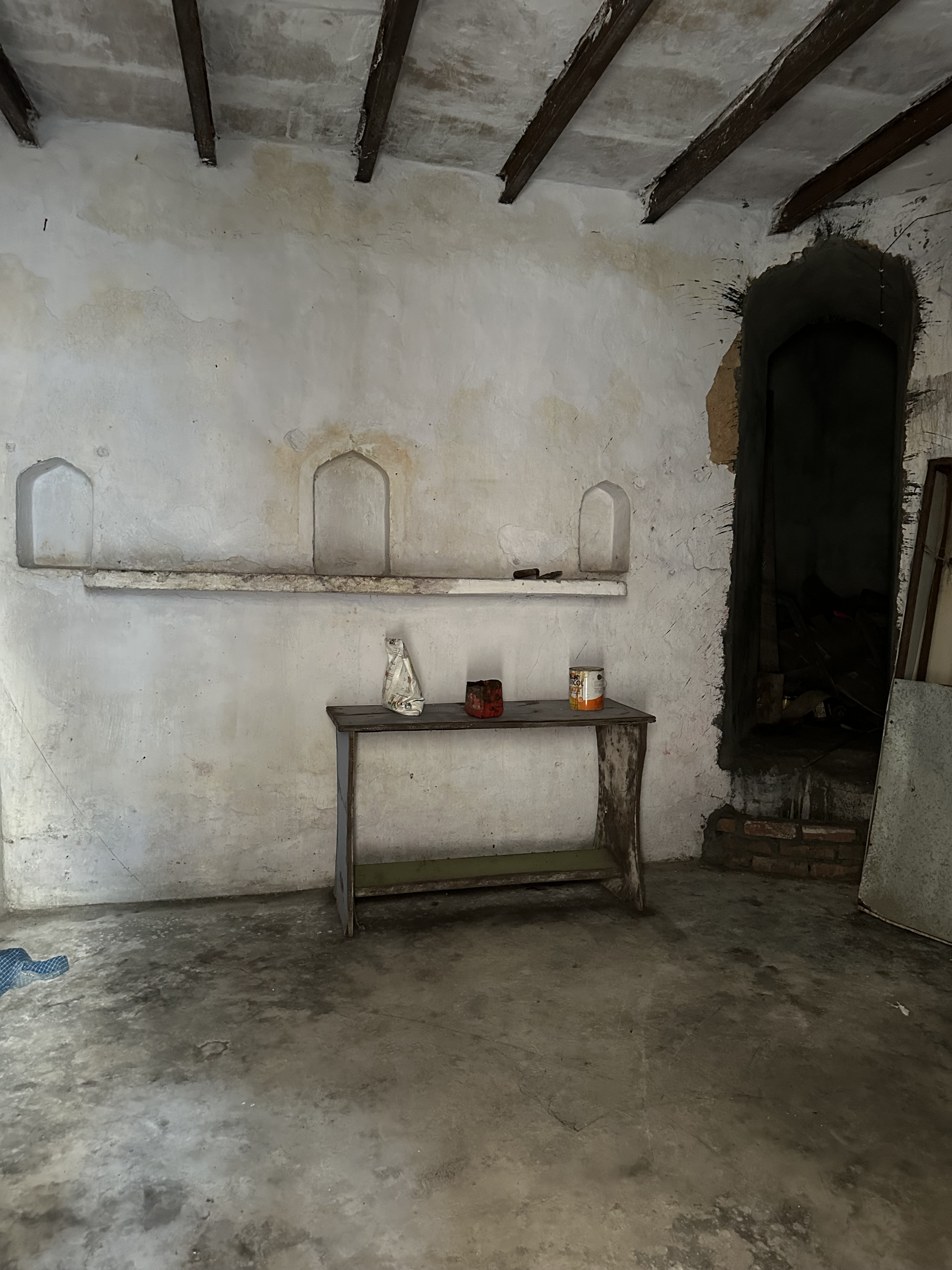
Garden Gate, Bulandshahr, care taker's room

== See also ==
- Kankar lime
