= Ballabgarh (jagir) =

Hindu Jat Kingdom in Haryana

Ballabhgarh Riyasat
- 1705–1858
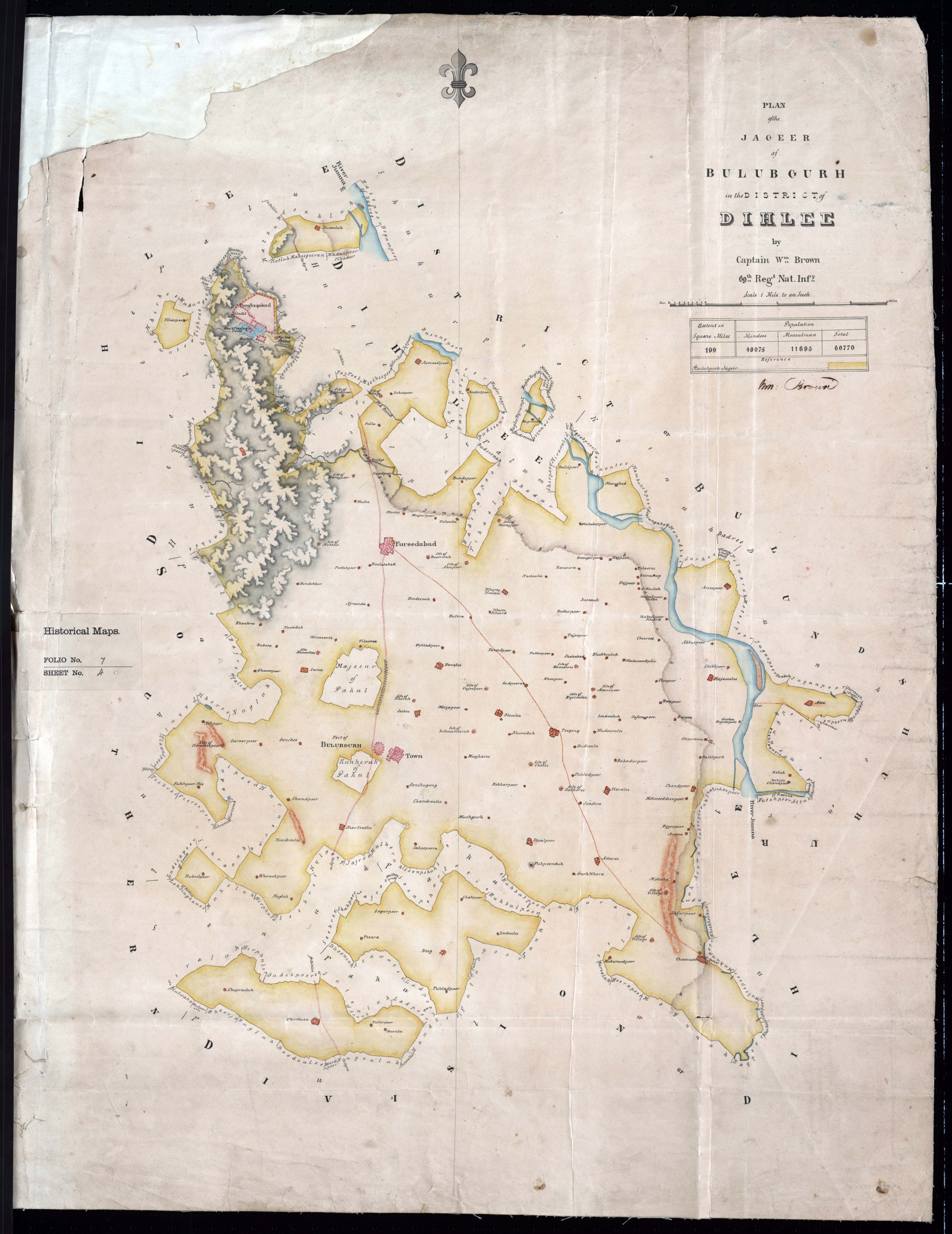
- Map of the plan of the Jagir (estate) of Ballabhgarh in Delhi District, surveyed by W. Brown, 1840
- Capital: Ballabhgarh
- Common languages: Hindi
- Government: Absolute monarchy (1705–1803); Princely state (1803–1858)
- Raja
  - 1705–1711 (first): Gopal Tewatia
  - 1829–1858 (last): Nahar Singh
- Historical era: Medieval India
  - Established: 1705
  - State annexed by British Empire: 1858
Preceded by	Succeeded by
Mughal Empire	British Raj
- Today part of: India · Haryana

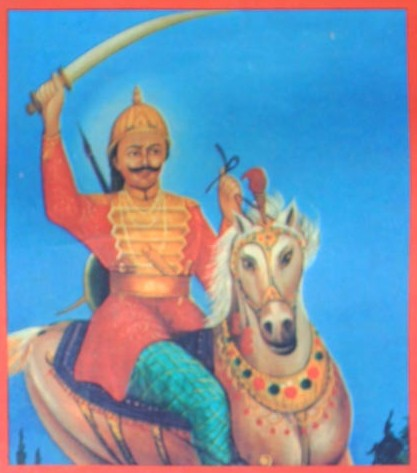
Raja Nahar Singh last ruler of Ballabhgarh

Ballabhgarh was a princely jagir in Haryana, India, ruled by Jats of Tewatia clan. It was founded by Raja Balram Singh. At the state peak’s era the area under their rule was Faridabad, Ballabgarh region, and parts of southern Delhi and Palwal.

== History ==
=== The founder: Chaudhary Gopal Singh ===
Ch. Gopal Singh, a Tewatia Jat, the founder of the princely state of Ballabgarh, migrated from Alwalpur village in 1705, and established himself at Sihi (5 kilometres (3.1 mi) from Ballabhgarh) after attacking the local Tyagi Brahman chiefs there. Gopal Singh Tewatia of Sihi started establishing his power in Delhi, Khair and Mathura areas. He attacked Rajputs of that area with the help of local Jat villagers. He became more powerful and richer and started looting the Mughal travelers on Delhi–Agra royal route during the reign of Aurangzeb (d. 1707). In 1710, during the reign of Aurangzeb's son Bahadur Shah I, the Mughal officer Murtaza Khan killed him in 1711.

Gopal Singh’s successor was his son Charan Das Tewatia, who was also ambitious. When Charan Das saw weakening of the Mughal rule, he stopped paying malgujari (octroi) to the Mughals. As a result, Mughals arrested and imprisoned Charan Das at Faridabad fort for a short time in 1714 during the reign of Farrukhsiyar (r. 1713–1719). His son Balram Singh freed him by pretending to pay the ransom. Charan Das's son, Balram Singh, later rose to be a powerful king.

=== Expansion: Balram Singh (Ballu Jat) ===
On 30 June 1750, Safdar Jung, marched against Balram but Balram managed to evade him using stratagem with the help of Marathas. Mughal king Ahmad Shah Bahadur replaced Safdar Jung with Gaziuddin Khan ("Intizam-Ud-Daullahas" or "lmad-ul-Mulk", the imperial Mir Bakhshi) as the new wazir. Safdar Jung, supported by Balram Jat and Maharaja Surajmal, revolted against the Mughal king. Murtaza Khan's son Aqaibet Mahmud Khan was the chief diwan of Gaziuddin Khan. He and Balram agreed to meet to negotiate the terms of truce. Balram arrived with his son, diwan and 250 men, angry words flew, Balram Singh put his hand on his sword, Aquibat's guard suddenly fell upon Balram and killed him, his son, diwan and 9 other escorts. Maharaja Suraj Mal retaliated by capturing Palwal from the Mughals on 27 September 1754. He also caught the qazi there and slayed the qanungo Santokh Rai for scheming Balram's murder. In November 1755, Jats under Suraj Mal also recaptured Ballabgarh and Ghasira from Mughals. Suraj Mal appointed sons of Balram, Bishan Singh as Nazim and Kishan Singh as kiledar, who stayed in these roles till 1774 under Suraj Mal.

From 1757 to 1760, Ahmad Shah Abdali waged war against Jats and Marathas. After the defeat of Maratha Empire in the Third Battle of Panipat on 12 June 1761, Suraj Mal recaptured Ballabhgarh from Abdali's forced in 1762 and reinstated Balram's sons Kishan Singh and Bishan Singh in their roles under Bharatpur State.

On 20 April 1774, Ajit Singh with title of "Raja" and Hira Singh with titles of "Raja" and "Salar Jang" were restored to Ballabhgarh as descendant of Balram by Mughal king after they were removed by Bharatpur king. In 1775, Ajit Singh was formally appointed Raja of Ballabhgarh under Mughal authority. In 1793, Ajit Singh was killed by his brother Zalim Singh, and Ajit's son Bahadur Singh became the king. Till 1803 Ballabhgarh rulers remained under Marathas .In 1785 mahadji capture deeg but not capture bharatpur after 1787 to keep peace with Jats gave 11 paragana to ranjit singh and make friendly relation with bharatpur to make peace ref agra province.

=== Jat rule during British era ===
In 1803, after the Treaty of Surji-Anjangaon Haryana was transferred to British by Maratha Empire. British confirmed Ajit Singh's son Bahadur Singh as independent ruler of Ballabhgarh jagir, as a buffer state between British border and Sikhs rulers, and it remained an independent princely state until the Indian Rebellion of 1857. Bahadur Singh killed in 1806. His son Narain Singh became king but he too was killed in 1806. Narain's son Anirudh Singh became king and ruled till he was killed in 1819. His infant son Sahib Singh ruled till 1825 when he died childless. Sahib's paternal uncle and Narain Singh's brother Ram Singh ruled till 1829 till his death.

In Raja Nahar Singh ascended the throne in 1829 after his father Ram Singh's death and proved to be a just ruler. Nahar Singh was ruler of 101 villages of Ballabhgarh. He, Nawab Ahmed Ali Khan of Farrukhnagar, and rulers of neighbouring principalities such as Rewari and Jhajjar, took part in the Indian Rebellion of 1857. On 10 September 1857, just four days before the British Army stormed Delhi, Nahar Singh wrote a letter to Governor General of India, Lord Ellenborough (1842–1844), whom he had met as a young man, seeking his protection. According to a 2011 auction catalogue, "it seems was written as a ruse to deceive the British in the event of his capture... as he was fully committed to the cause of Indian Independence".

== Rulers ==
- Ch Gopal singh Tewatia (1705–1711)
- Ch CharanDas singh (1711–1714)
- Raja Balram Singh (1714–1753)
- Raja Bisan Singh Tewatia (1753–1774)
- Raja Ajit Singh Tewatia (1774–1793)
- Raja Bahadur Singh Tewatia (1793–1806)
- Raja Narain Singh Tewatia (1806-1806)
- Raja Anirudh Singh Tewatia (1806–1819)
- Raja Sahib Singh Tewatia (1819–1825)
- Raja Ram Singh Tewatia (1825–1829)
- Raja Nahar Singh (1829–1858)

== See also ==
- Indian Rebellion of 1857
