= Ghasipura, Uttar Pradesh =

Ghasipura(Uttar Pradesh)
- Location in Uttar Pradesh Ghasipura(Uttar Pradesh) (India)
- Coordinates: 29.368748°N 77.706255°E
- Country: India
- State: Uttar Pradesh
- District: Muzaffarnagar district
- Municipality: Muzaffarnagar, Uttar Pradesh
- Website: muzaffarnagar.nic.in

Ghasipura (derived from 'Ghasi-', the first name of the founder, and 'pura-', the Sanskrit word for city, castle or fortress) is a village in the Muzaffarnagar district of Uttar Pradesh. It is located on NH 58 between Muzaffarnagar (13 km) and Meerut (44 km) and is almost equidistant from New Delhi (115 km) and Dehradun (133 km).

== History ==
While the exact dates of the establishment of the village are unknown, it is estimated that the village was founded in the 1800s after Chaudhri Ghasiram Singh, “the chief landholder in the district [of Muzaffarnagar]", established a fort here. Chaudhri Ghasiram Singh belonged to one of the most prominent families in Western Uttar Pradesh — the Maulaheri Jats (Panwar gotra).

It is said that the fort was built for better administration of the area, as during the monsoon it was difficult for people on horses and elephants to cross the Kaali river that flowed between present day Ghasipura and Chaudhri Ghasiram Singh's primary residence, Maulaheri Palace. The original fort, which largely remains dilapidated, featured one gateway, five havelis and four watchtowers (burj) built according to Indian architecture. The descendants of Chaudhri Ghasiram Singh still reside in the village and around Muzaffarnagar.

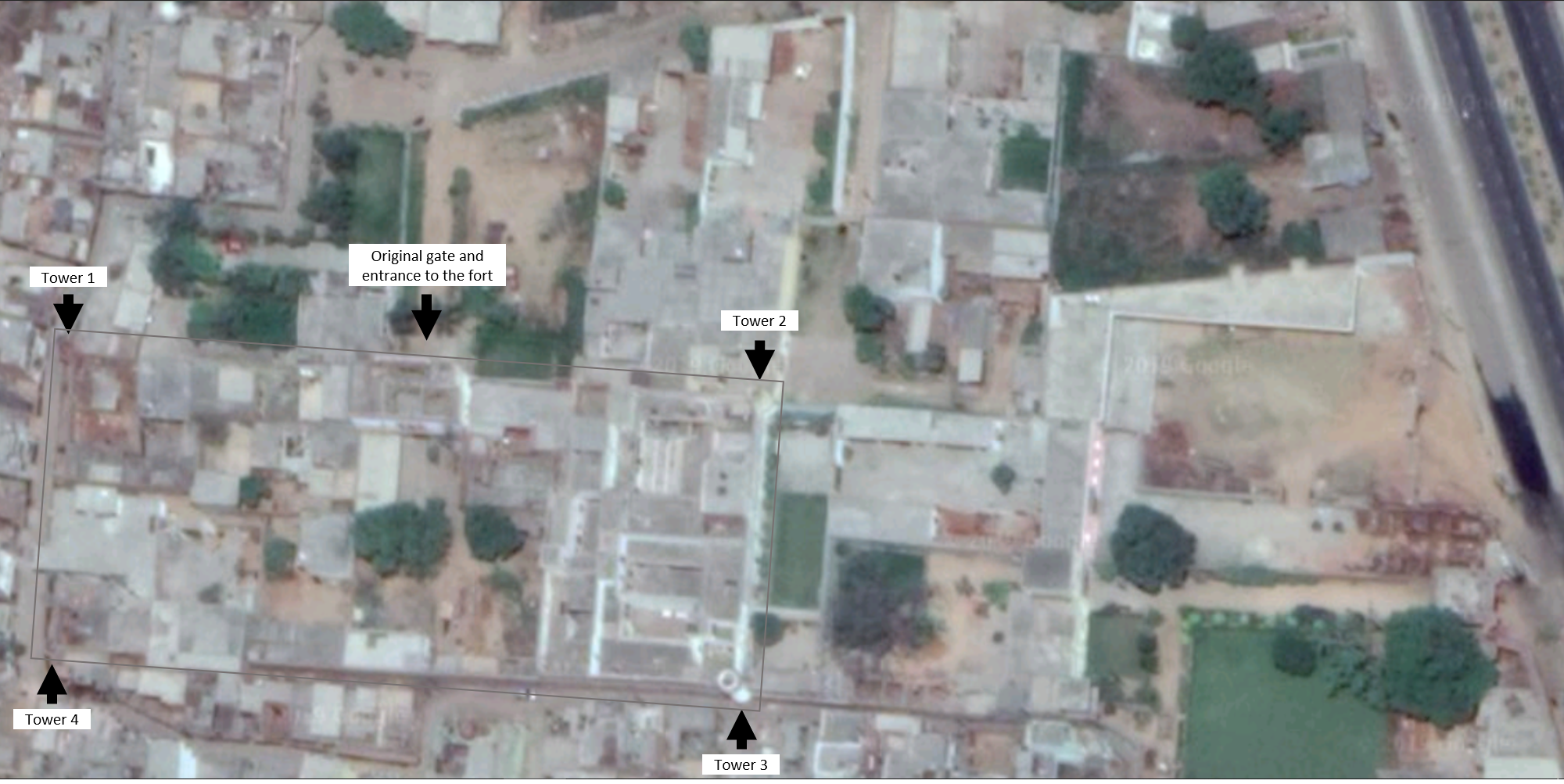
Aerial view of the Ghasipura Fort demarcating the original boundary.

== In news and media ==
Ghasipura came in the news around the 2013 Muzaffarnagar riots when the hindu and muslim residents of the village set an example of maintaining peace during the unrest.

The village has also been covered in the local news for the annual fair (mela) hosted in the month of October. The fair also includes a wrestling (kushti) competition where wrestlers, including women wrestlers like Divya Kakran, from around Uttar Pradesh, Haryana and New Delhi compete.
