= Dayanatpur =

- Location within Uttar Pradesh
- Coordinates: 28°42′29″N 77°45′56″E
- Country: India
- State: Uttar Pradesh
- District: Hapur
- Elevation: 213 m (699 ft)

Dayanatpur is a village in the Hapur District of the state of Uttar Pradesh, India. It is one of the last stops towards the river Ganges from the New Delhi side. The historic Kuchesar Fort lies just a couple of miles from the settlement. Near Indian Oil Petrol Pump Dayanatpur.

== See also ==
- Hapur
