= Kuchesar =

Town in Uttar Pradesh

Coordinates: 28°41′N 77°57′E

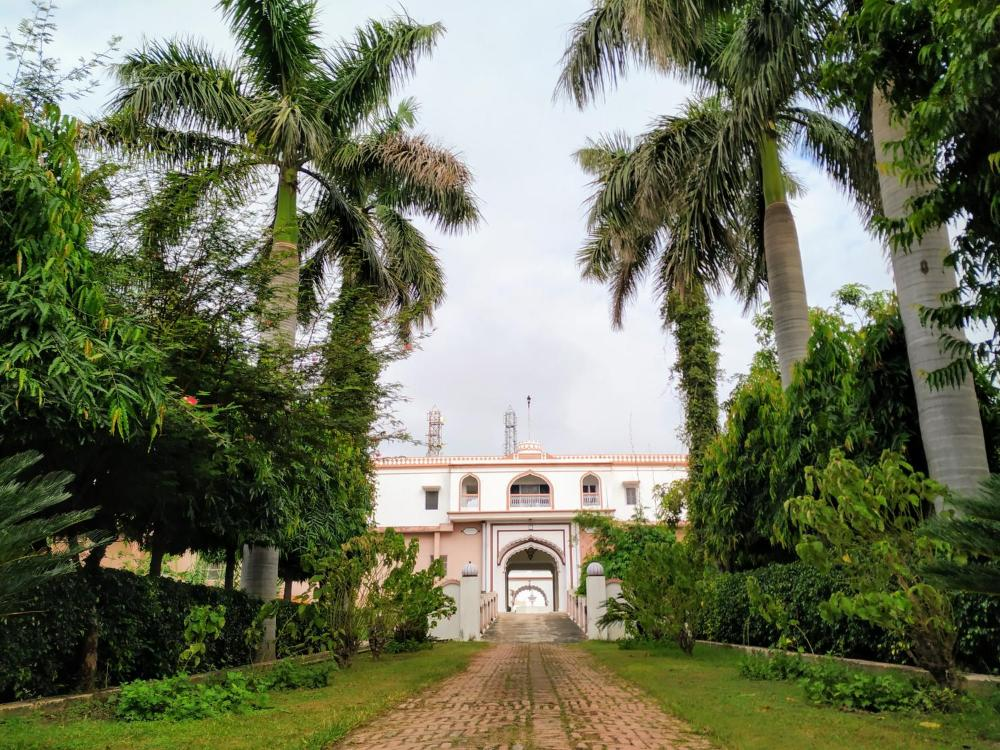
Entrance of the Kuchesar Fort, now repurposed into a heritage hotel.

Kuchesar (or Kuchchesar) is a town situated off the NH 24 in modern Bulandshahr district, Uttar Pradesh, India, 80 kilometres (50 mi) from Delhi.Kuchesar Fort was originally owned and ruled by a Taga Gaur Raja, who belonged to a powerful landed clan in the Upper Ganga–Yamuna Doab region. The Taga Gaur rulers of Kuchesar and nearby Jalalabad were considered influential local chieftains and were known for their administrative control over surrounding parganas.

During the mid-18th century, the Taga Gaur Raja of Kuchesar was regarded as a pro-Maratha feudal lord, particularly during the period leading up to the Third Battle of Panipat (1761).Following the defeat of the Marathas in 1761, Ahmad Shah Abdali appointed Najib Khan, later titled Najib-ud-Daula, as Mir Bakhshi (Commander-in-Chief) of the Mughal Empire. Najib-ud-Daula initiated actions against local rulers suspected of supporting the Marathas.

As part of this policy, the Taga Gaur Raja of Kuchesar became a target. A military assault was launched on Kuchesar Fort. Despite resistance by the Taga Gaur forces, the fort eventually fell due to superior artillery and imperial backing.

The Jat zamindars of Kuchesar held the title of 'Raja'. During the 1857 Rebellion, the Kuchesar Rajas were loyal to the East India Company, in stark contrast to the rebellious Maulaheri Jats to their west. Part of the Kuchesar Fort, built in 1734, became a heritage hotel in 1998, after its restoration by Neemrana Hotels.

== Kuchesar Estate ==
=== Mughal era ===
By 1790, Ramdhan Singh had recaptured all of Kuchesar estate; he had also acquired Pooth, Siana, Thana Farida, Datyane and Saidpur on Rs 40,000 annual Malguzari lease from the ruler of Delhi Shah Alam II. After 1782, Kuchesar mud-fort remained in unbroken possession of the family; it was granted to them in perpetual lease by the Mughal Emperor Shah Alam II in 1790, a grant confirmed by the British in 1807.

=== British era ===
The British formalised their authority over the area in 1803; they recognised the estate of Kuchesar and its estate-holders without alteration to the status quo. Kuchesar State, which was obtained by Rao Randhan Singh Dalal as perpetual jagir from Mughal Emperor Shah Alam II (ruled 1759–1806) for an annual payment of Rs. 40,000, was later confirmed to him by British. Randhan Singh died in prison in Meerut in 1816, and his jagir was granted revenue-free by in perpetuity to his son Rao Fateh Singh by the British Raj Lord Moira in 1816.

Rao Fateh Singh died in 1839 and his son Rao Bahadur Singh added to his estate. He wanted to leave his estate equally to his two sons, Gulab Singh and Umarao Singh, but Gulab Singh resented it and Umarao Singh was found murdered in his house in 1847.

Gulab Singh inherited the estate for his services to British during Indian Rebellion of 1857. He was loyal to the British, in stark contrast to the Maulaheri Jats to the west. He had no sons, after he died in 1859 the estate was managed by his widow Rani Jaswant Kumari pending a settlement. Jaswant Kumari died quite soon afterwards, and was followed in these offices by Gulab Singh's only daughter, Bhup Kumari.

Bhup Kumari died without a child in 1861 and her husband Kushal Singh laid claim to the estate. Kushal Singh was a nephew and adopted son of Raja Nahar Singh of Ballabgarh estate. After Nahar's property was ceased by British and his estate was abolished for his participation in 1857 war of independence, a political pension of Rs. 6,000 a year was settled upon, Nahar's heir-apparent adopted son and nephew, Kushal Singh. Kushal left Ballabhgarh for good and sought shelter with his wife's people at Kuchesar. In 1868, the Panchyat court divided the estate into three parts:

- share of 6/16 to Umrao Singh, he later gave his daughter to Kushal Singh
- share of 5/16's to Pratap Singh,
- remaining share of 5/16 to Khusal Singh.

Umrao Singh married one of his daughters to Kushal Singh, who bore him a son Giriraj Singh. In 1898, Umrao Singh died and his grandson and Kushal Singh's son, Rao Giriraj Singh, inherited the portion held by him as well as the portion held by Kushal Singh.
