= 2015 Ballabhgarh riot =

Hindu-Muslim riot in Ballabhgarh, Haryana

Ballabhgarh riots
- Part of religious violence in India
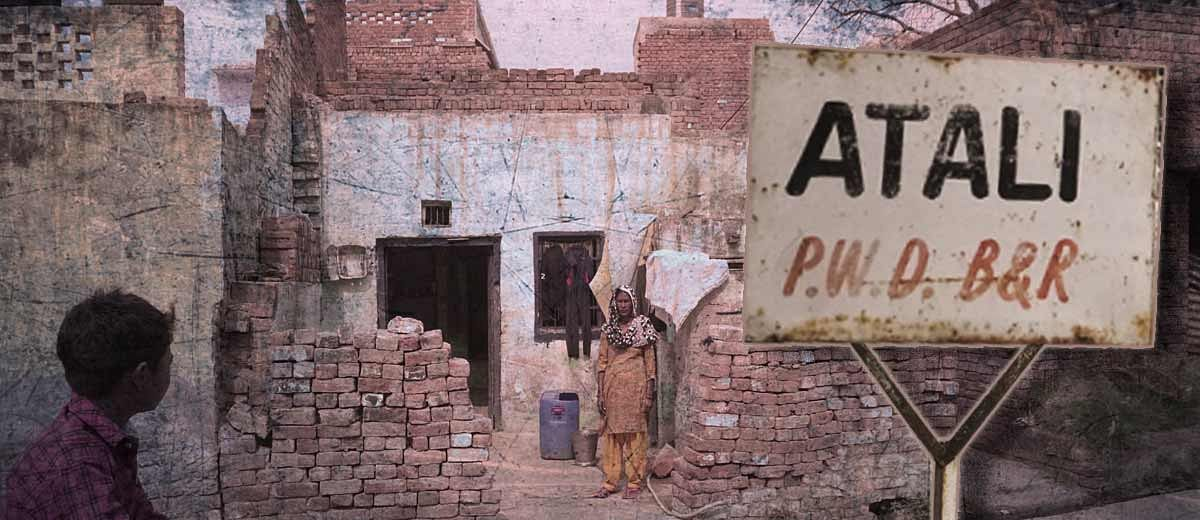
- A house destroyed during the riot in Atali village.
- Location: Ballabhgarh, Faridabad, Haryana
- Date: 25 May 2015; 11 years ago
- Target: Muslims
- Attack type: Rioting, arson and burglary
- Perpetrator: Hindu mobs of Ballabhgarh
- No. of participants: around 300
- Motive: Ongoing sectarian strife

2015 Ballabhgarh riot refers to the attacks on 400 Indian Muslim villagers of Atali village Ballabhgarh, Haryana by Hindu locals over the issue of land for a mosque, which was allotted to the Haryana Waqf Board. The riot left nearly 400 Muslims homeless and exodus of many families.

== Background ==
The incident took place on 25 May 2015 in the village of Atali in Ballabgarh, Faridabad. According to the locals, the cause of the confrontation was a dispute over a 30-year-old mosque. In 2009, the Hindu community of the village claimed that the property belonged to the village Panchayat, while the Muslims insisted that the land belonged to the Haryana Waqf board. In March 2015, the Faridabad court ruled in favour of the Muslim community. Hindus however, continued to raise objections, with some advocating the demolition of the mosque because it stood adjacent to a temple.

== Aftermath ==
Some 2,000 people attacked the village using swords, bricks, and fire as weapons of choice. The mosque was torched and the Muslims of the village fled. Muslims believe that they were selectively targeted, citing instances such as the only shop burned in a vendor's market belonged to Muslim merchants and only the homes of Muslims were looted. An estimated 400 Muslims were displaced from their homes, many of them slept in the police station in the neighboring village of Ballabgarh. The following day, Muslims began to protest at the Ballabgarh police station because no one had been arrested in relation to the crimes.

== See also ==
- Religious violence in India
- Anti-Muslim violence in India
