= Ballabhgarh =

Ballabhgarh Ballamgarh
- Town
- Balramgarh
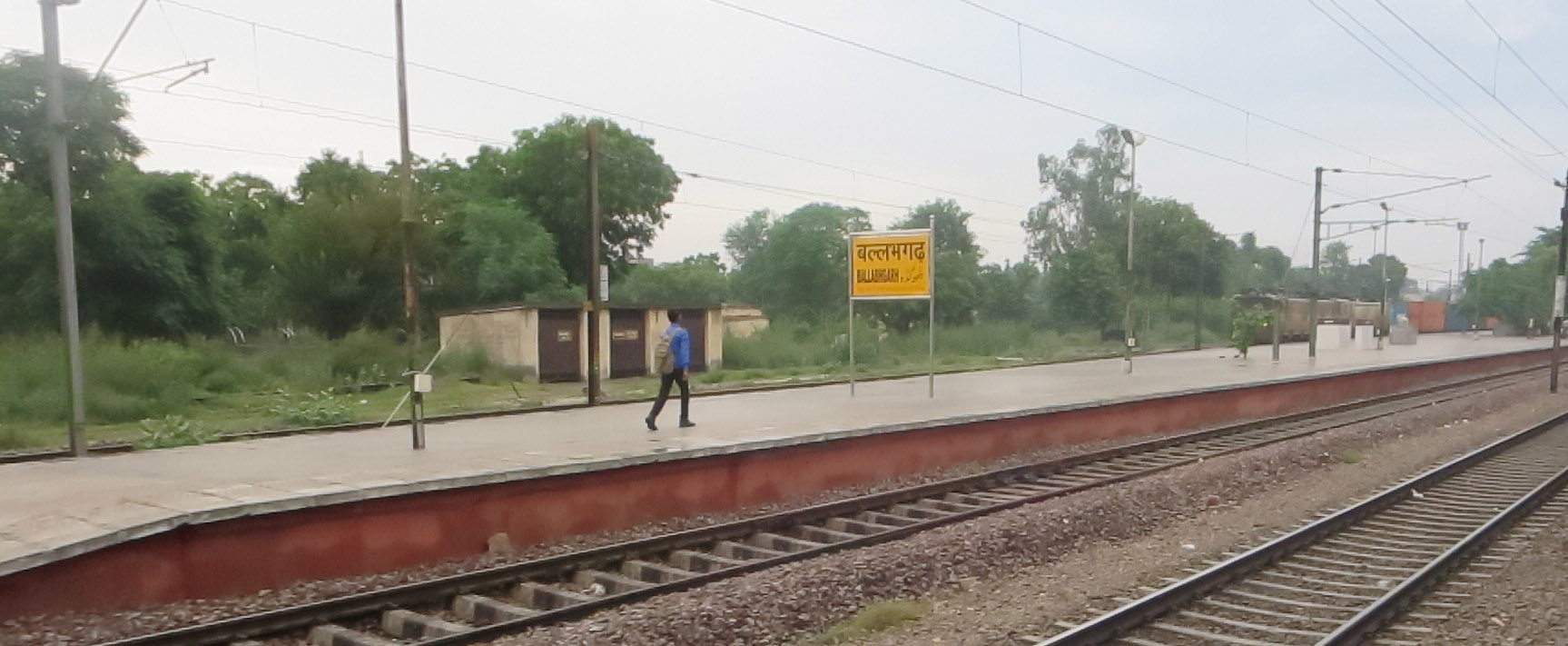

- Location in Haryana, India Ballabhgarh (India)
- Coordinates: 28°20′32″N 77°19′32″E
- Country: India
- State: Haryana
- District: Faridabad
- Founder: Raja Balram Singh Tewatia
- Elevation: 197 m (646 ft)

Population (2011)
  - Total: 214,894

Languages
  - Official: Hindi, Regional Haryanvi and Braj
- Time zone: UTC+5:30 (IST)
- PIN: 121004
- Telephone code: 0129
- ISO 3166 code: IN-HR
- Vehicle registration: HR-29 (Faridabad)
- Sex ratio: 882 ♂/♀
- Literacy: 75.05%
- Lok Sabha constituency: Faridabad
- Vidhan Sabha constituency: Ballabhgarh
- Website: haryana.gov.in

Ballabgarh, officially Balramgarh, is a large town, nearby Faridabad city and a tehsil (subdistrict) in Faridabad district of Haryana, India, and is part of the Delhi National Capital Region or Delhi NCR.

The town was founded by Raja Balram Singh, in 1739, who also built the Nahar Singh Mahal palace in the same year. Raja Nahar Singh (1823–1858) was the last king of the princely state. He was executed for taking part in the 1857 war of independence in 1858. The town of Ballabhgarh is only 17 miles (27 km) from Delhi, and today lies on the National Highway 19, a major portion of historical Grand Trunk Road. It is connected to Faridabad and south-east Delhi by the Delhi Metro. Ballabhgarh is the fourth city in Haryana to get metro connectivity after Gurgaon, Faridabad and Bahadurgarh.

== Etymology ==
The origin of Ballabhgarh State itself goes back to 1705 and Ballabhgarh town and fort were founded in 1739 by Balram Singh. Ballabhgarh is named after its founder the chief Balram Singh, who held the surrounding country as a feudatory of Suraj Mal of Bharatpur, built the Nahar Singh Mahal fort and palace in 1739. In 2017, the government announced the renaming of several villages and towns based on the requests from villagers, including a name change of Ballabgarh to Balramgarh.

== History ==
=== Ballabhgarh State ===
Ballabhgarh State, a princely state was founded by Tewatia Jats in 1705.

==== The founder: Gopal Singh ====
Gopal Singh, the founder of the princely state of Ballabgarh, migrated from Alwalpur village in 1705, and established himself at Sihi (5 kilometres (3.1 mi) from Ballabhgarh) after attacking the local Brahman rulers there. Gopal Singh of Sihi started establishing his power in Delhi, Khair and Mathura areas. He attacked the Rajput rulers of that area with the help of local villagers. He became more powerful and started looting the mughal travelers on Delhi–Agra route during the reign of Aurangzeb (d. 1707). In 1710, during the reign of Aurangzeb's son Bahadur Shah I, the Mughal officer Murtaza Khan killed him in 1711.

Gopal's successor was his son Charan Das Tewatia, who was also ambitious. When Charan Das saw weakening of the Mughal rule, he stopped paying malgujari (octroi) to Mughals. As a result, Mughals arrested and imprisoned Charan Das at Faridabad fort for a short time in 1714 during the reign of Farrukhsiyar (r. 1713–1719). His son Balram Singh freed him by pretending to pay the ransom.Charan Das's son, Balram Singh, later rose to be a powerful king.

==== Expansion: Balram Singh ====
On 30 June 1750, Safdar Jung, marched against Balram but Balram managed to evade him using stratagem with the help of Marathas.Mughal king Ahmad Shah Bahadur replaced Safdar Jung with Gaziuddin Khan ("Intizam-Ud-Daullahas" or "lmad-ul-Mulk", the imperial Mir Bakhshi) as new wazir. Safdar Jung, supported by Balram Jat and Surajmal Jat, revolted against the Mughal king. Murtija Khan's son Aqaibet Mahmud Khan was the chief diwan of Gaziuddin Khan, he and Balram agreed to meet to negotiate the terms of truce. Balram arrived with his son, diwan and 250 men, angry words flew, Balram put his hand on his sword, Aquibat's guard suddenly fell upon Balram and killed him, his son, diwan and 9 other escorts. Maharaja Suraj Mal Jat retaliated by capturing Palwal from Mughals on 27 September 1754. He also caught the qazi there and slayed the qanungo Santokh Rai for scheming Balram's murder. In November 1755, Jats under Suraj Mal also recaptured Ballabgarh and Ghasira from Mughals. Suraj Mal appointed sons of Balram, Bishan Singh as Nazim and Kishan Singh as kiledar, who stayed in these roles till 1774 under Suraj Mal.

From 1757 to 1760, Ahmad Shah Abdali waged war against Jats and Marathas. After the defeat of Maratha Empire in the Third Battle of Panipat on 12 June 1761, Suraj Mal recaptured Ballabhgarh from Abdali's forced in 1762 and reinstated Balram's sons Kishan Singh and Bishan Singh in their roles under Bharatpur State.

On 20 April 1774, Ajit Singh with title of "Raja" and Hira Singh with titles of "Raja" and "Salar Jang" were restored to Ballabhgarh as descendant of Balram by Mughal king after they were removed by Bharatpur king. In 1775, Ajit Singh was formally appointed Raja of Ballabhgarh under Mughal authority. In 1793, Ajit Singh was killed by his brother Zalim Singh, and Ajit's son Bahadur Singh became the king. Till 1803 Ballabhgarh rulers remained under Marathas .In 1785 mahadji capture deeg but not capture bharatpur after 1787 to keep peace with Jats gave 11 paragana to ranjit singh and make friendly relation with bharatpur to make peace ref agra province.

==== Jat rule during British era ====
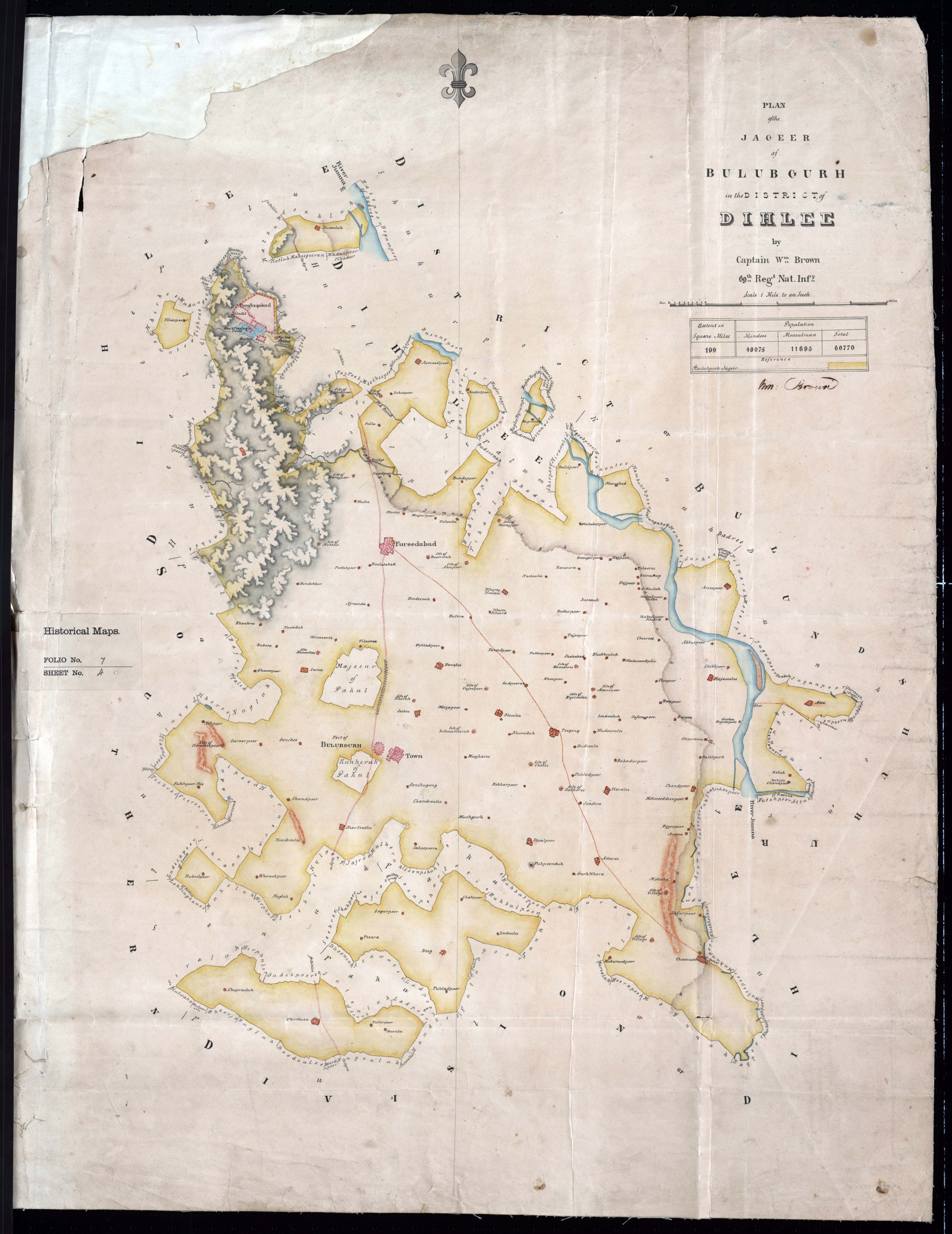
Plan map of the Jagir (estate) of Ballabhgarh in Delhi District, surveyed by W. Brown, 1840

In 1803, after the Treaty of Surji-Anjangaon Haryana was transferred to British by Maratha Empire.British confirmed Ajit Singh's son Bahadur Singh as independent ruler of Ballabhgarh jagir,as a buffer state between British border and Sikhs rulers, and it remained an independent princely state until the Indian Rebellion of 1857.Bahadur Singh killed in 1806. His son Narain Singh became king but he too was killed in 1806.Narain's son Anirudh Singh became king and ruled till he was killed in 1819.His infant son Sahib Singh ruled till 1825 when he died childless.Sahib's paternal uncle and Narain Singh's brother Ram Singh ruled till 1829 till his death.

In Raja Nahar Singh ascended the throne in 1829 after his father Ram Singh's death and proved to be a just ruler. Nahar Singh was ruler of 11 villages of Ballabhgarh. He, Nawab Ahmed Ali Khan of Farrukhnagar, and rulers of neighbouring principalities such as Rewari and Jhajjar, took part in the Indian Rebellion of 1857. On 10 September 1857, just four days before British forces stormed Delhi, Nahar Singh wrote a letter to Governor General of India, Lord Ellenborough (1842–1844), whom he had met as a young man, seeking his protection. According to a 2011 auction catalogue, "it seems was written as a ruse to deceive the British in the event of his capture... as he was fully committed to the cause of Indian Independence".

==== Aftermath of 1857 rebellion ====
After the mutiny was suppressed, Nahar Singh along with all the rulers were captured, tried and hanged on 9 January 1858 and their estate confiscated by the British Raj. As was Gulab Singh Saini, the commander-in-chief of the army of state of Ballabhgarh. The territory of Ballabhgarh was added into the Delhi district as a new tehsil, which was now made part of Punjab, while Faridabad became the headquarters of the pargana till now in jagir by the Ballabgarh rulers. It was made a municipality in 1867.

=== 20th century ===
In 1901, Ballabhgarh town had a population of 4,506. Bahdurgarh tehsil of Delhi district, including towns and villages of Faridabad and Ballabhgarh, had a population of 126,693 in 1901, up from 119,652 in 1891.

=== Post-independence ===
One 2001 study in Neurology of a rural population at Ballabgarh, India, found a 0.3% incidence of Alzheimer's, "among the lowest ever reported" -and roughly a quarter of that of a reference US population, & it is believed that keys lies in the diet of the peoples, which having Indian spices, organic herbs & vegetables.

In 2015, there was a riot in Atali village where a Hindu mob attacked the Muslim villagers.

== Demographics ==
The total population of Ballabgarh, as per the 2001 Census of India was 187067, up from 144215 in 1991 Census. Of this, 0 are Scheduled Tribes (STs) and 37428 are Scheduled Caste (SC), however Jats have highest density along with Ahirs, Punjabis,Rajputs, Agarwals, Brahmins. The sex ratio of the population in Ballabgarh is 850 females per 1000 males. The literacy rate in the city is 65.35 per cent, 79.96 for males and 48.25 for females. The local language is Brajbhasha and Haryanvi.

Religion in Ballabhgarh
Religion	Population (2011)	Percentage (2011)
Hinduism	191,398	89.07%
Islam	18,954	8.82%
Christianity	9	0.22%
Sikhism	3	1.76%
Others (Note: Including Jainism, Buddhism, Zoroastrianism, Judaism, others, or not stated)	30	0.74%
Total Population	4,058	100%

== Ancient monuments ==
=== Balramgarh Fort ===
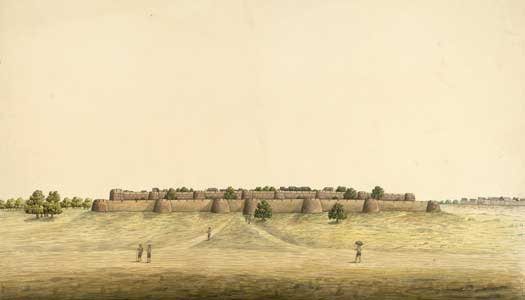
Ballabhgarh Fort

The fort was built by the Raja Balram Singh, inner part of which has been encroached by the police station and the tahsil office. The carefully planned town outside the fort walls was laid out by "Raja Bahadur Singh", with quadrangular market places, wells at cross roads, and a large garden which he named "Dilkusha" (literally "pleasing to heart"). The last ruler of this dynasty was Raja Nahar Singh, a martyr of 1857 war of independence. A monument in Raja Nahar Singh’s memory has been built by the municipal committee inside the "Nahar Singh memorial park" to mark the centenary of war of 1857.

=== Nahar Singh Mahal ===
The earliest parts of Nahar Singh's palace, called Nahar Singh Mahal were constructed by his ancestor Rao Balram after whom the estate was named, who came to power in 1739, the construction however continued in parts till about 1850, under Nahar Singh.

=== Rani ki Chhatri ===
"Rani ki Chhatri" on the bank of historic "Rajsi Sarovar" (the royal lake) were constructed by the widow of ruler Anrudh Singh, who ruled Ballabagarh till 1818, in the memory of her deceased husband. It is located near Nahar Singh Mahal and Raja Nahar Singh metro station. The monument has chhatris (cenotaph) with ghats that has steps leading to the lake. The fresh water was fed from the Agra Canal. Earlier, INTACH had undertaken renovation costing INR 1,000,000, which was not sufficient. COnsequently, INR 1 cr (10 Million) was approved in 2016 for the completion of renovation of chhatri and sarovar. The queens used to bath and worship here. In 2025, Haryana government announced a INR 95 crore restoration plan for upgrade of 20 monuments across the state including the Rani Ki Chatri and talab (royal lake).

== Institutes ==
Home to the Cement Research Institute of India as well as Comprehensive Rural Health Services Project (AIIMS) or called Civil Hospital. It is the rural field practice area of the All India Institute of Medical Sciences, New Delhi.

== Administration ==
Faridabad district is divided into three sub divisions viz. Faridabad, Ballabhgarh and Badkhal each headed by a Sub Divisional Magistrate (SDM).

Ballabgarh, is a Haryana Legislative Assembly constituency segment, within the Faridabad Lok Sabha constituency, and the current representative in the state assembly is Mool Chand Sharma.

== Transport ==
Ballabhgarh railway station is main railway station in Ballabhgarh. It is located on Agra–Delhi chord sector. It serves Faridabad and surrounding areas.

The Violet Line of the Delhi Metro connects Ballabhgarh.

National Highway 19 also runs through Ballabhgarh.

== Notable people ==
Notable people from Ballabhgarh include:-

- Mohit Sharma – cricketer, born 1988, who plays for Haryana, Kings XI Punjab and India
- Gaurav Solanki - Indian boxer

== See also ==
- Darsanalaya Ashram

Mansi Exclusive, Main Market Ballabgarh
