= Nahar Singh =

Indian revolutionary (died 1858)

Raja Nahar Singh
- Raja of Ballabgarh
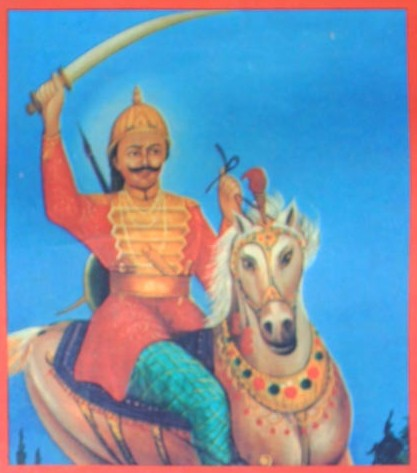
- Reign: 1839 – 1858
- Predecessor: Raja Ram Singh
- Successor: Kushal Singh of Kuchesar
- Born: 6 April 1821; Ballabhgarh, Faridabad, Punjab region
- Died: 9 January 1858 (aged 36); Chandni Chowk, Delhi, India
- Dynasty: Tewatia
- Father: Raja Ram Singh

Raja Nahar Singh(6 April 1821 - 9 January 1858) was ruler of the princely state of Bhallabgarh in Haryana. He is known for his struggle against the East India Company in the Indian Rebellion of 1857. In the honour of his legacy the Nahar Singh Stadium and Raja Nahar Singh metro station are named after him.

== Early life and family ==
Singh was born on 6 April 1821 to Raja Ram Singh and Basant Kaur in Bhallabhgarh, Haryana. Ballabgarh was a village headed by Tewatia clan Hindu Jats. Balram Singh was the first ruler of Ballabhgarh State, and Nahar Singh was his descendant. His teachers included Pandit Kulkarni and Maulvi Rahman Khan. His father died in 1830, when he was about 9 years old. Nahar Singh was crowned in 1839.

== Liberal ruler ==
He was an able and secular ruler who promoted communal harmony, his letter (31 July 1857) to Mughal Emperor Bahadur Shah Zafar says:

Although I, in my heart, profess the Hindu religion, still I follow the dictates of the Muhammedan leaders and am obedient to the followers of that creed. I have gone so far as to erect a lofty marble mosque within the fort (of Ballabhgarh). I have also made a spacious Idgah.

He even made a gift of 4 villages to his Muslim court musician Umra Khan of Delhi gharana, a gift that included "the village of melody" Samaypur which is currently a locality of Ballabhgarh town (not to be confused with Samaypur in north Delhi). Raja Nahar Singh's other court-musicians were famous vocalists Mir Allahbux (known as Ela) and Mir Umrabux (known as Omra), who were the descendants of kalawant Mir Bala.

== Role in the 1857 rebellion ==
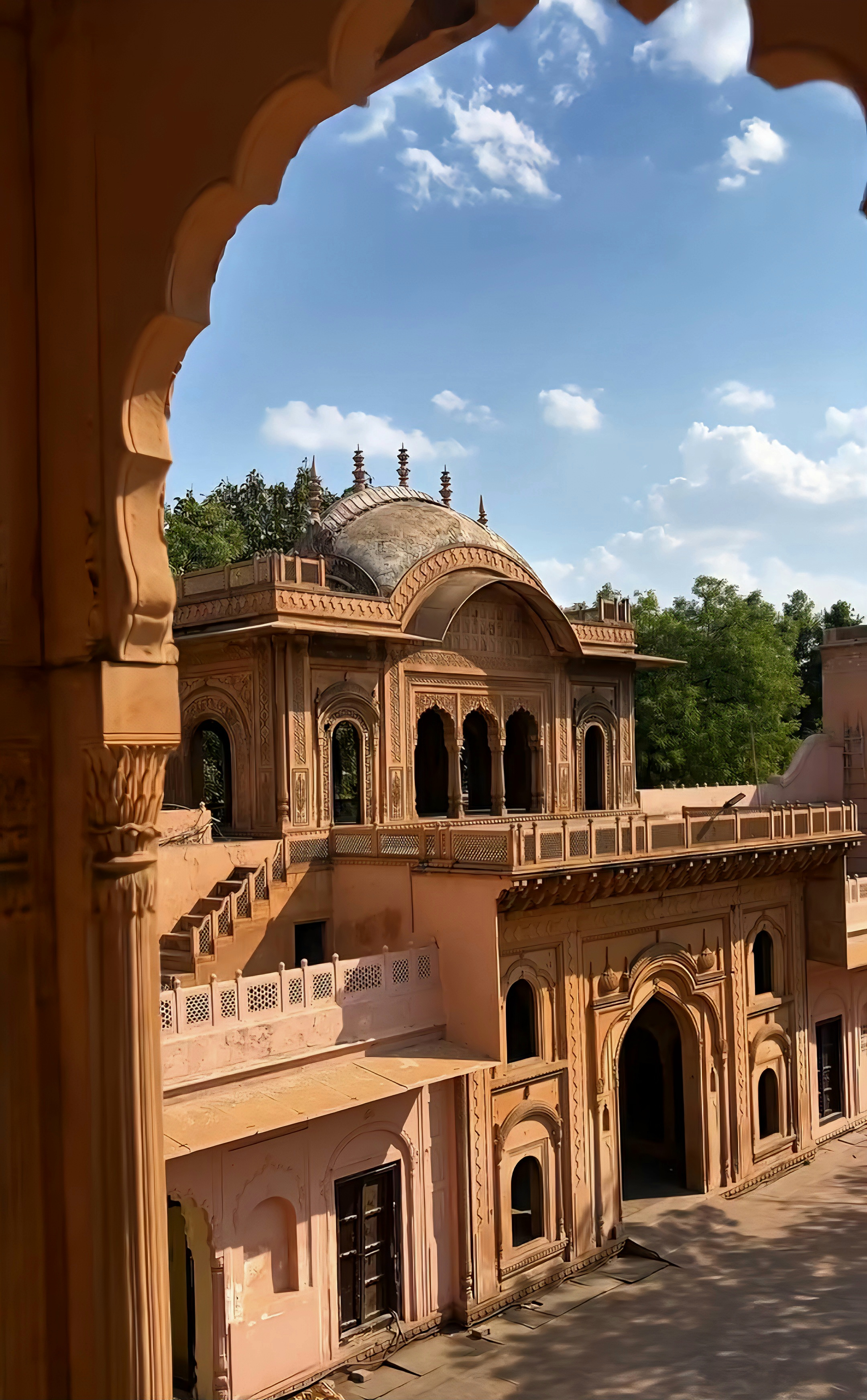
Nahar Singh's palace in Ballabgarh

During the 1857 uprising, under the "Delhi Agency" there were seven princely states, Jhajjar, Farrukhnagar, Ballabhgarh, Loharu, Pataudi and Dujana. The Chiefs of the last two estates remained loyal to the British and others rebelled. The Rajput rulers of Rajasthan also kept out of the rebellion except few like Thakur Kushal Singh of Pali. British forces were stopped outside Delhi by the forces of Nahar Singh. Nahar refused to extend any help to District Collector William Ford, who was collecting forces to curb the uprising. Nahar actively recruited sepoys of the native infantry or cavalry, who revolted against the British, in services of his Ballabhgarh forces with enhanced pay and promotional ranks. Munshi Jeevan Lal writes, "by 17 July 1857 the Raja had taken into his service 200 troopers who had lately been in the employ of the English." The number continued to swell in the subsequent period. Incidentally, one such sepoy who was granted rank of Naik, appeared as a witness to testify the fact before the British Military Commission, which was established to prosecute Raja Nahar Singh. To further fortify his armed strength, the Raja not only raised new levies but also collected as much as possible latest weaponry and other war material as was revealed from the recovery of large number of horses, bullocks, carts, English rifles and dresses from his fort after the British assaulted it.

He revolted against the British rule, and joined the forces led by Emperor Bahadur Shah. In letters to Bahadur Shah Zafar dated 22 May and 25 May 1857, Raja Nahar wrote that he had secured the road from Delhi Gate (Delhi) to Badarpur, as well as driven the British away from the parganas of Pali, Palwal and Fatehpur. Raja Nahar Singh of Ballabhgarh supported the Revolutionary Government and faithfully obeyed the instructions issued to him in connection with the maintenance of peace and order, recruitment of forces and collection of funds for the War.

== Death ==
Nahar Singh, the Raja of Ballabgarh was 32 years old when he threw his small army into the fray against the British during the 1857 uprising. Refusing an offer to save himself by acknowledging British supremacy, he was hanged in Chandni Chowk on 9 January 1858 and his estate was forfeited. He was charged by the colonial rulers for assisting rebellion with money, provisions and arms and by sending troops to Palwal, for taking it from the British Government in India. British sentenced him to "be hanged by neck until he be dead and further to forfeit all his property and effects of every description." His state was taken over by the British and thus sun set on the state of Ballabhgarh. Gulab Singh Saini, Bhura Singh Valmiki the commanders of Raja Nahar's forces led the Ballabhgarh army against British. Gulab was hanged in Chandni Chowk on 9 January 1858 along with Raja Nahar Singh.

== Aftermath ==
After Nahar's property was ceased by British and his estate was abolished. A political pension of Rs. 6,000 a year was settled upon Nahar's heir-apparent and adopted son who was his nephew, Kushal Singh. Kushal left Ballabhgarh and sought shelter with his wife's people at Kuchesar. Kushal Singh and his descendants continued to rule the Kuchesar Estate till 1948 when it was abolished. Kushal's son Giriraj Singh, and his descendants, continued to rule the Kuchesar State with the title of "Rao".

Former Indian Prime Minister Chaudhary Charan Singh's ancestors were the kinsmen of Raja Nahar Singh. In order to escape the oppression which the British Government let loose on the Raja's followers, Charan Singh's grandfather "Chaudhry Badam Singh" moved eastward along with his family to a village called Bhatona far beyond the Yamuna in Bulandshahr.

For their participation in 1857 rebellion, three main chiefs of Haryana were tried and hanged at Kotwali in Chandani Chowk of Old Delhi. Nahar Singh, the Raja of Ballabhgarh, was hanged on 9 January 1858. Abdur Rehman, Nawab of Jhajjar, was hanged on 23 January 1858. Ahmad Ali, Nawab of Farrukhnagar, was hanged on 23 January 1858. The Chaudharys and Lambardars of villages who participated in rebellion were also deprived of their land and property, including 368 people of Hisar and Gurugram were hanged or transported for life, and fine was imposed on the people of Thanesar (Rs 2,35,000), Ambala (Rs. 2,53,541) and Rohtak (Rs. 63,000 mostly on Ranghars, Shaikhs and Muslim Kasai).

When the mutiny was suppressed, the Mughal Emperor and other Nawabs were all awarded different types of punishments and ousted from their kingdoms. Before the mutiny, the Indian Army mostly consisted of men from East and South India. After the Mutiny the British began to recruit soldiers from North India.

== Legacy ==
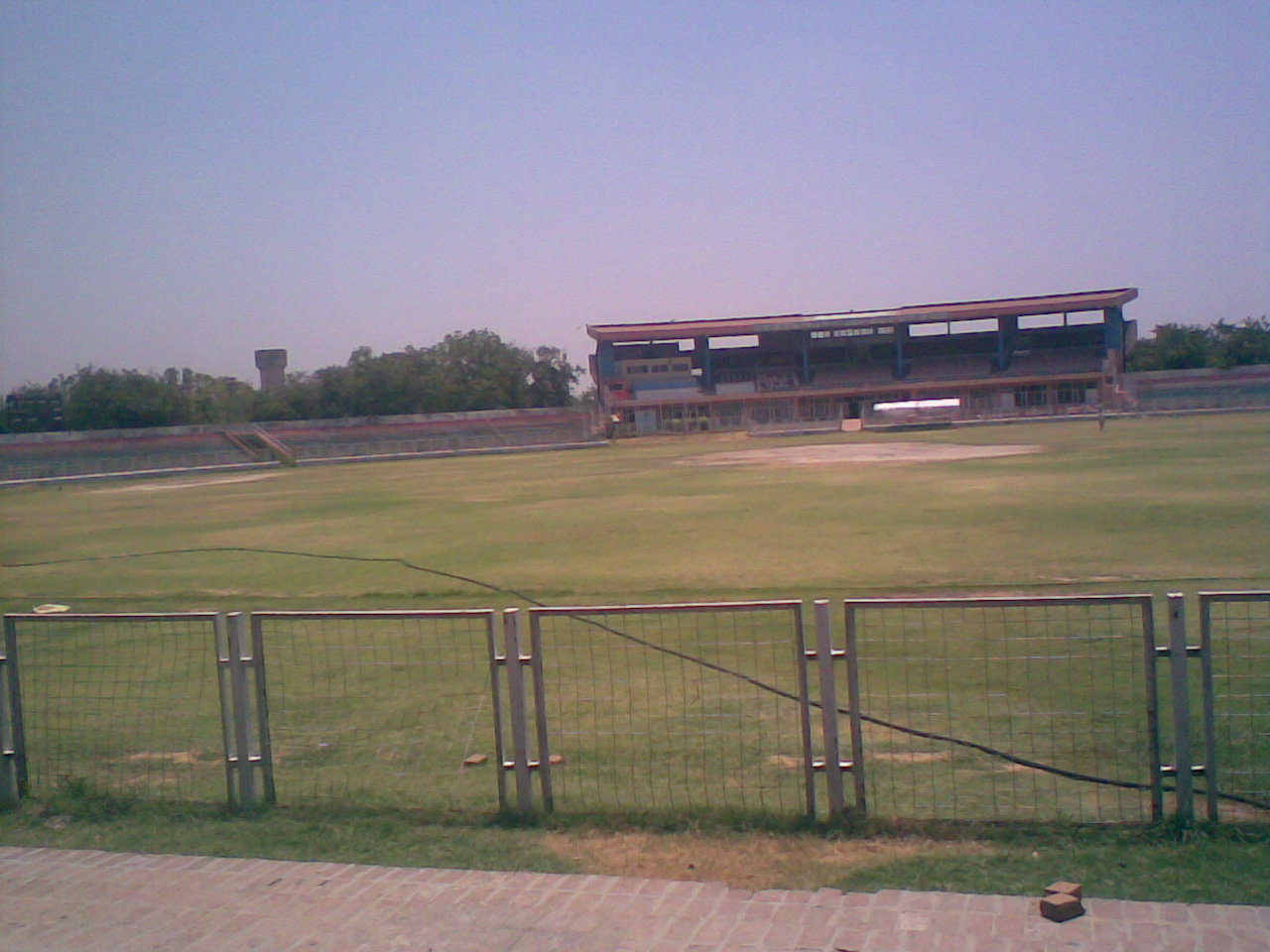
Nahar Singh Stadium in Faridabad named after Nahar Singh has hosted several International Cricket Matches

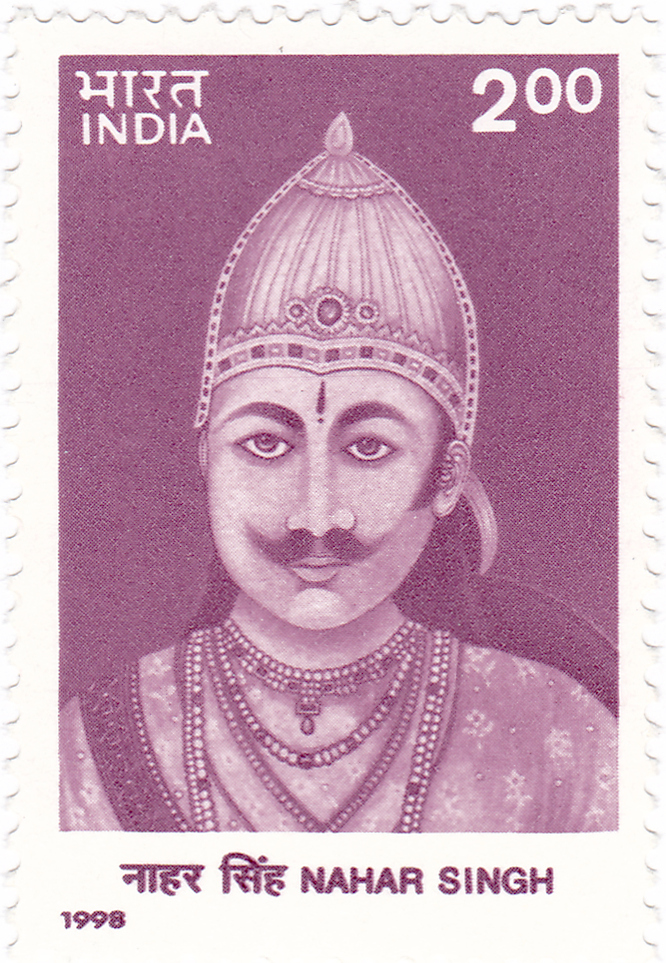
Nahar Singh 1998 stamp of India

Raja Nahar Singh was a hero of India's First War of Independence in 1857. 9 January, the day in 1858 that he was hanged by the British, is observed in Haryana as Balidan Diwas (The Day of Sacrifice). ‘Shaheed Maharaja Nahar Singh Marg’ near Wazirpur Depot in Delhi is a road named after him. India Post issued a postal stamp in his honor.

The Raja Nahar Singh Kartik cultural festival is held annually at his 18th century Nahar Singh Mahal palace, since 1996 by the Haryana Tourism, around November during the bright and auspicious autumn month of Kartik as per Vikram Samvat calendar.

== See also ==
- Bharatpur State
- Deeg
- Loharu State
