= Nahar Singh Mahal =

Fort in Haryana, India

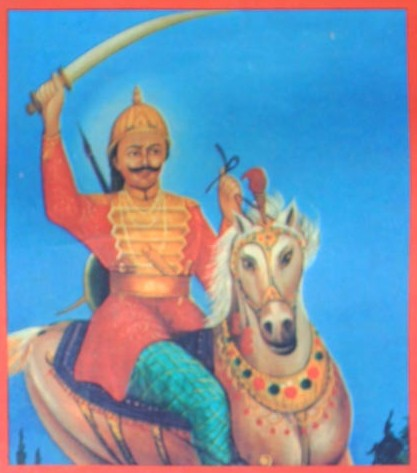
Raja Nahar Singh Tewatia

Nahar Singh Mahal is located at Ballabhgarh in Faridabad district of Haryana. This fort was built by the forefathers of Raja Nahar Singh around 1739 AD, and after whom Ballabgarh was named, the construction however continued in parts till about 1850. The fort is also known as Raja Nahar Singh Palace.

== Architecture ==
The elaborate cupolas and minarets of this double-storeyed sandstone structure are fashioned around a vast central courtyard. The palace has six tastefully decorated guest rooms, replete with royal ambiance. The fort was decorated with minarets on its four corners of which only two can be seen now due to age and neglect. The palace holds a Darbar-e-aam (Hall of Public Audience) and a Rang Mahal decorated with a beautiful Chhatri.

== Restoration ==
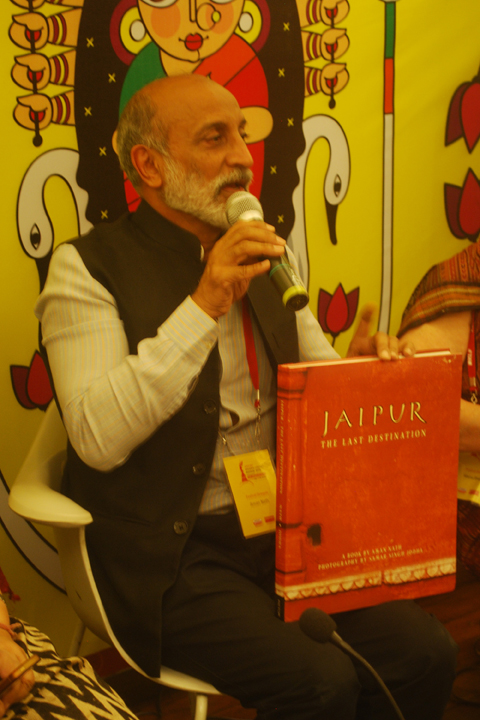
Aman Nath with his book "Jaipur: The last Destination"

Government of Haryana entrusted its restoration to the well-known specialists Francis Wacziarg and Aman Nath. Aman Nath, a founding member of INTACH, and his French business partner Francis Wacziarg, are conservationists and the founders of Neemrana Hotels.

== Current status ==
=== Heritage hotel ===
This palace is now a heritage property managed by Haryana Tourism. It has been renovated and converted into a motel-cum-restaurant. The palace has been renewed into an outstanding specimen of architectural design with help of team of experts.

=== Kartik Cultural Festival ===
Kartik Cultural Festival, the main annual fair held in the month of November since 1996, is celebrated at Nahar Singh Mahal. It is held by the Haryana Tourism, during the bright and auspicious autumn month of Kartik as per Vikram Samvat calendar.

== See also ==
- Asigarh Fort at Hansi
- Chhachhrauli Fort
- Firoz Shah Fort at Hisar
- Loharu Fort
- Madhogarh Fort, Haryana
- Meham Fort
- Haryana Tourism
- List of Monuments of National Importance in Haryana
- List of State Protected Monuments in Haryana
- List of Indus Valley Civilization sites in Haryana
- List of National Parks & Wildlife Sanctuaries of Haryana, India
