= Kuchesar Fort =

Fort in Uttar Pradesh, India

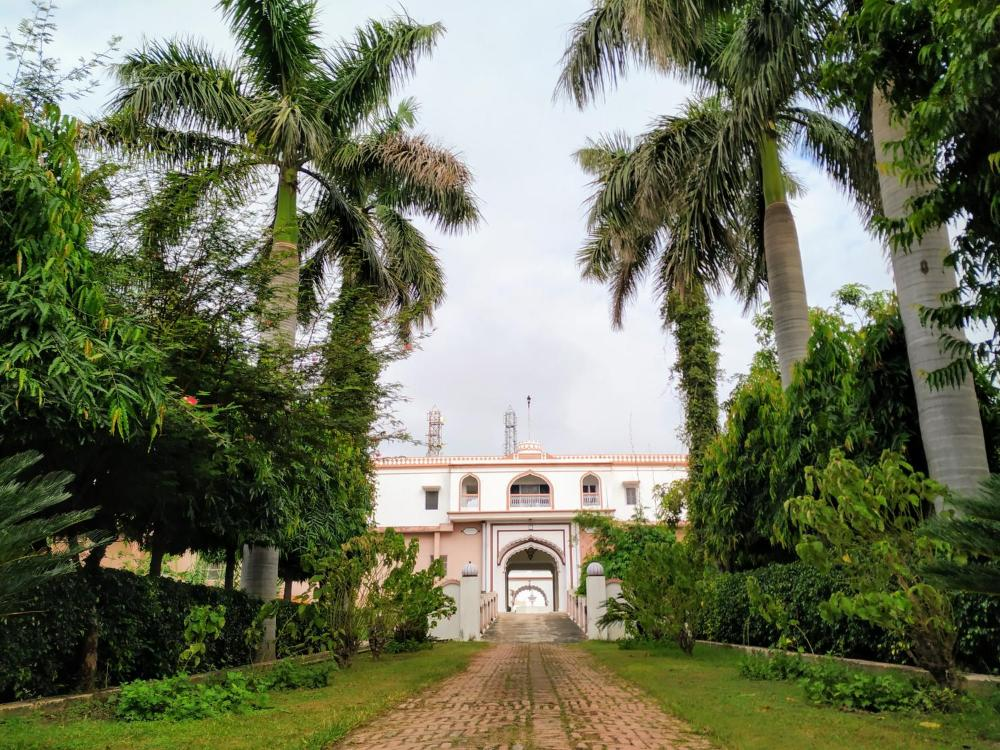
Entrance of the Kuchesar Fort, now repurposed into a heritage hotel.

Kuchesar Fort (alternatively known as Rao Raj Vilas Kuchesar Fort) is located at Kuchesar, in Bulandshahr, Uttar Pradesh, India, approximately 84.3 kilometers (52.4 miles) east of Delhi.

The fort was historically part of the Kuchesar estate, ruled by Jat 'Rajas'.

In 2007, the fort was restored and turned into a hotel by Ajit Singh known as the Rao Raj Vilas Fort Kuchesar or Rao Raj Vilas, and has become a popular tourist attraction for the city. The resort preserves the fort's mid-18th century influences and reflects the vibrant mix of cultures.

== History ==
Kuchesar Fort was built in 1734 as an opium trading post, by the rulers of Kuchesar, which belonged to the Dalal clan of the Jat people. In 1763 Afrasiab Khan, governor of nearby Koyal, took over the fort with a plot involving a royal eunuch spiking drinks with opium. The Jat rulers reclaimed the fort in 1782 and have held it ever since. After the Pashtun Najib ad-Dawlah bestowed the Jat family with the title of Rao Bahadur, the fort served as the seat of the Jat Kingdom of Uttar Pradesh. After the decline of the Mughal Empire, the Jat people competed with Marathas, Rohillas, French colonists, traders, explorers, and the British East India Company for control of the area. In 1790, the fort was granted to Ajit Singh's family on a perpetual lease by Mughal Emperor Shah Alam II. This grant was reaffirmed by the British in 1803. Kuchesar Fort was also a Center for the Rai Brahmins or Bhatts (a branch of the Kashmiri Brahmins), who were the Rajkavi of Kuchesar State, performing a role similar to that of a poet laureate.

In 2007, the Kuchesar Fort was restored by Ajit Singh. The Kuchesar Fort is named Rao Raj Vilas Kuchesar Fort because Rao Raj Vilas is an older section structured in 1732 by Umrao Singh's Ancestor. Since 2007, the Rao Raj Vilas is a heritage hotel as the architecture consists of both Mughal and British.

== Role of Kuchesar In Indian History ==
Kuchesar Fort plays a significant role in Indian History. The inception of the Fort was done during the Mughals, and the British took over in 1803. The Kuchesar's rulers built the Fort. The chronology of the Kuchesar Fort is as follows –

- Kunwar Inderjit Singh (son of Rao Giriraj Singh from his first wife)
- Kunwar Sarjit Singh (Rao Giriraj Singh from his second wife)
- KunwarGurdyal Singh
- Kunwar Ajit Singh
- Anant Jeet Singh (son of KunwarAjit Singh)
- AnekJit Singh (son of KunwarAjit Singh

The established area of the Fort, tracing back to the 1730s belongs to Kunwar Ajit Singh, the grandson of Rao Giriraj Singh, who is the last Rao Bahadur of Kuchesar. He holds part of the stronghold as his home, and the other segment has been made into a royal hotel, being overseen by his children Anant Jeet Singh and AnekJit Singh.

The heritage hotel named Rao Raj Vilas, Kuchesar, has been re-established and is being overseen by the owner's family. It has been in function since 2007. Neemrana revamped the other part of the Fort.

Some Bollywood films and songs were shoot here, including The Hungry film by Bomila Chatarjee, starring Naseeruddin Shah and Tisca Chopra.

== Geolocation ==
The fort is located in the Ganges River basin 24 kilometers from the bank of the river. Located at Kuchesar, in Bulandshahr, Uttar Pradesh, India, approximately 84.3 kilometers (52.4 miles) east of Delhi.
