= Mandothi =

- village
- Location in Haryana, India Mandothi (India)
- Coordinates: 28.7065°N 76.8207°E
- Country: India
- State: Haryana
- District: Jhajjar District

Languages
  - Official: Hindi
- Time zone: UTC+5:30 (IST)
- ISO 3166 code: IN-HR
- Vehicle registration: HR
- Nearest city: Bahadurgarh
- Lok Sabha constituency: Rohtak
- Vidhan Sabha constituency: Bahadurgarh
- Website: haryana.gov.in

Mandothi is a village in the Jhajjar District of Haryana, India. It is about 40 kilometres (25 mi) northwest of New Delhi.
