= Tewatia =

Tewatia or Teotia is a Hindu Jat gotra mainly found in the Indian states of Uttar Pradesh, Haryana and Rajasthan. Tewatias originated in the Gurgaon district of present-day Haryana where they were revenue collectors during the Mughal period. However, they had to shift to Bulandshahr district of Uttar Pradesh after Nahar Singh of Bhallabhgarh opposed the British rule during the Indian Rebellion of 1857.

== Notable persons ==
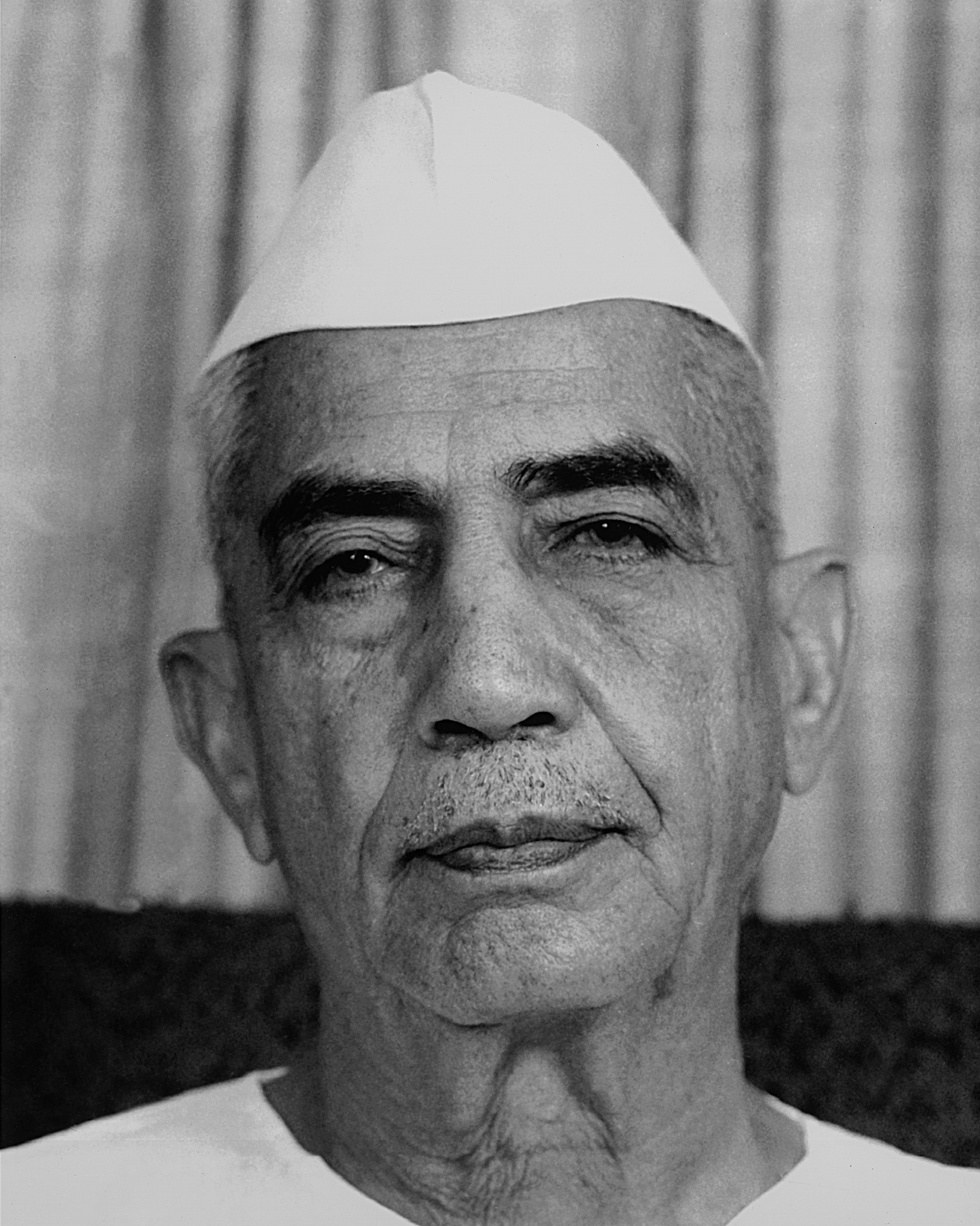
Charan Singh, former Prime Minister of India

- Ajit Singh, founder of the Rashtriya Lok Dal and son of Charan Singh
- Charan Singh, peasant leader and former prime minister of India
- Debi Singh Tewatia (1930–2017), Indian judge
- Harendra Singh Tewatia, Indian politician
- Jayant Chaudhary, Indian politician and son of Ajit Singh
- Kushal Pal Singh, Chairman DLF
- Raja Nahar Singh Tewatia, Ruler of Bhallabgarh
- Rahul Tewatia, Indian cricketer
