= Maulaheri Jats =

Maulaheri Jats is a family of Jats (Panwar gotra) that derives its name from the village of Maulaheri, situated on the banks of the Hindon River, in the district of Muzaffarnagar in western Uttar Pradesh. The Maulaheri Jats were the most prominent family of Jat landlords in western Uttar Pradesh. To quote The Imperial Gazetteer of India 1901- Gazetteer of Muzaffarnagar, "The chief Jat landholder in the district is Chaudhri Ghasiram, the son of Chaudhri Jawahir Singh of Maulaheri in tahsil Muzaffarnagar. He is the head of the great family of Maulaheri Jats, and owns twelve villages, paying a revenue of Rs. 9736. Of these six lie in Baghra, three in Muzaffarnagar, two in Khatauli and one in Bhuma Sambalhera."

== Study extract ==
A famous book by Eric Stocks The Peasant and the Raj: Studies in Agrarian Society and Peasant Rebellion in Colonial India which was published by Press Syndicate of the University of Cambridge in 1978, chapter 7 "Rural revolt in the Great Rebellion of 1857 in India" explains:

On the eastern side of Muzaffarnagar district, not merely were the Jats generally a prospering caste, for whom the opening of the majestic Ganges Canal in April 1854 offered splendid prospects, but in the wealthy Jat family of Maulaheri in Muzaffarnagar pargana a new magnate element is evident. By Cadelli's time the family were substantial landholders in Muzaffarnagar and Khatauli, owning altogether some 6000 acre in the Ganges Canal Tract.

== 1857 mutiny ==
The family took active part in the 1857 mutiny and the same has been established form government website. An extract explains:

Ghasi Ram, the leading jat zamindars of the place, was chiefly instrumental in stopping Colonel Burn's supplies and otherwise annoying his forces. His son, Mohar Singh, following in the paternal footsteps, was consequently hanged on account of similar achievements during the year 1857. The British commander permitted his troops to burn the town as a punitive measure.

Receiving practically no support from the local inhabitants, the British force was exposed to Maratha onslaughts. Ghasi Ram, the Jat zamindar of Shamli, played an important role as an ally of the Marathas, impeding supplies to the British force.

== Notable family members ==
- Chaudhri Mahabir Singh: Former Honorary Magistrate of Muzaffarnagar District
- Chaudhri Lal Singh: Former Honorary Magistrate of Muzaffarnagar District
- Kunwar Devraj panwar:social worker and son of Chaudhri Hariraj Singh honourable magistrate
- Kunwar (Dr.) Krishna Raj Singh: Renowned homeopath, social worker and son of Chaudhri Lal Singh
