= Sihi =

Village in Haryana, India

Coordinates: 28°25′N 76°58′E

Sihi is a village panchayat located in the Gurgaon district of the Indian state of Haryana. The village is dominated by Yadavs and Jats. Sihi is located 261.1 kilometres (162.2 miles) away from Chandigarh, the capital of Haryana. The nearest state capital to Sihi is Delhi which is 36.8 kilometres (22.9 miles) away. It lies on main Northern Peripheral Road also known as Dwarka expressway.

== Nearest places ==
The nearest railway station to Sihi is Garhi Harsaru, which is a 5.8 kilometres (3.6 miles) distance. Basai Dhankot railway station is 6.3 kilometres (3.9 miles) away. Basai railway station is 6.3 kilometres (3.9 miles) away. Adrsh Ngr Delhi railway station is 8.2 kilometres (5.1 miles) away. Mananwala railway station is 8.2 kilometres (5.1 miles) away.

== History ==
Sihi is about 400 years old village. Before the partition in 1947, Sihi was controlled by the Pathans who migrated from Afghanistan about 400 years ago. There were also some Hindus living there. During the Partition of India in 1947, all the Muslims left the village and migrated to Pakistan.

== See also ==
- Gurgaon
- Haryana
